= Fukamizo Station =

Railway station in Yamaguchi, Yamaguchi Prefecture, Japan

Fukamizo Station 深溝駅
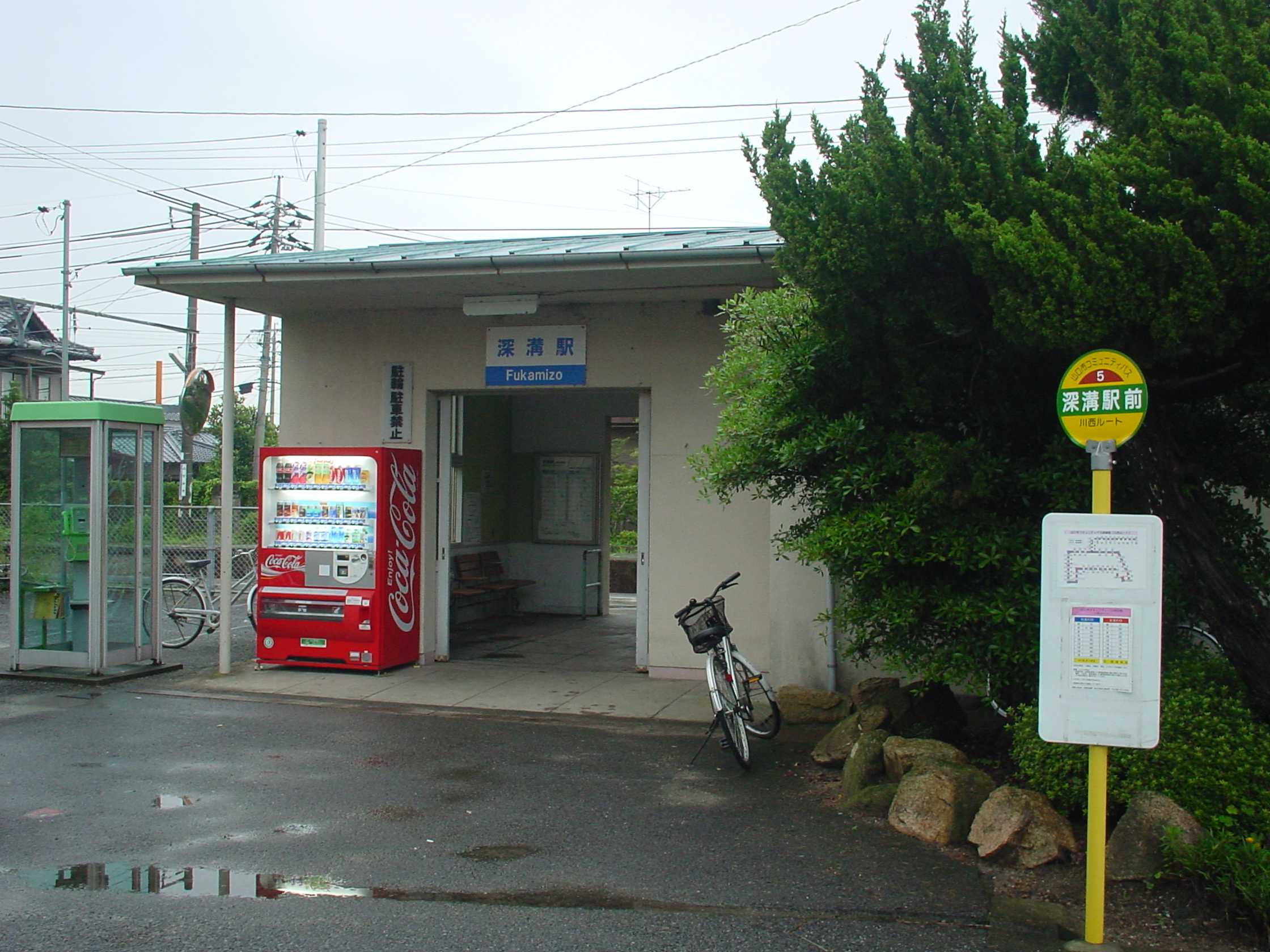
- Fukamizo Station in July 2006

General information
- Location: Fukamizo Matsubara-minami 1597, Yamaguchi-shi, Yamaguchi-ken 754-0895; Japan
- Coordinates: 34°2′49.16″N 131°22′16.73″E
- Owner: West Japan Railway Company
- Operator: West Japan Railway Company
- Line: Ube Line
- Distance: 5.9 km (3.7 miles) from Shin-Yamaguchi
- Platforms: 2 side platforms
- Tracks: 2
- Connections: Bus stop

Other information
- Status: Unstaffed
- Website: Official website

History
- Opened: 26 March 1925; 101 years ago

Passengers
- FY2020: 79

Services
Preceding station	JR West	Following station
Kami-Kagawa towards Shin-Yamaguchi	Ube Line Local	Suō-Sayama towards Ube
Location
- Location within Yamaguchi Prefecture Location within Japan

Fukamizo Station (深溝駅, Fukamizo-eki) is a passenger railway station located in the city of Yamaguchi, Yamaguchi Prefecture, Japan. It is operated by the West Japan Railway Company (JR West).

== Lines ==
Fukamizo Station is served by the JR West Ube Line, and is located 5.9 kilometers from the terminus of the line at Shin-Yamaguchi.

== Station layout ==
The station consists of two unnumbered opposed ground-level side platforms connected to the station building by a footbridge. The station is unattended.

=== Platforms ===
1	■ Ube Line	for Shin-Yamaguchi
2	■ Ube Line	for Ube-Shinkawa and Inō

== History ==
Fukamizo Station was opened on 26 March 1925 when the Ube Railway was extended from Ogōri Station (present-day Shin-Yamaguchi) to Hon-Ajisu Station (present-day Ajisu Station). The line was nationalized in 1943, becoming the Ube Higashi Line, and was renamed the Ube Line on 1 February 1948. With the privatization of the Japan National Railway (JNR) on 1 April 1987, the station came under the aegis of the West Japan railway Company (JR West).

== Passenger statistics ==
In fiscal 2020, the station was used by an average of 79 passengers daily.

== Surrounding area ==
- Hoshoji Temple
- Yamaguchi Logistics Industrial Complex
- Japan National Route 190

== See also ==
- List of railway stations in Japan
