= Ajisu Station =

Railway station in Yamaguchi, Yamaguchi Prefecture, Japan

Ajisu Station 阿知須駅
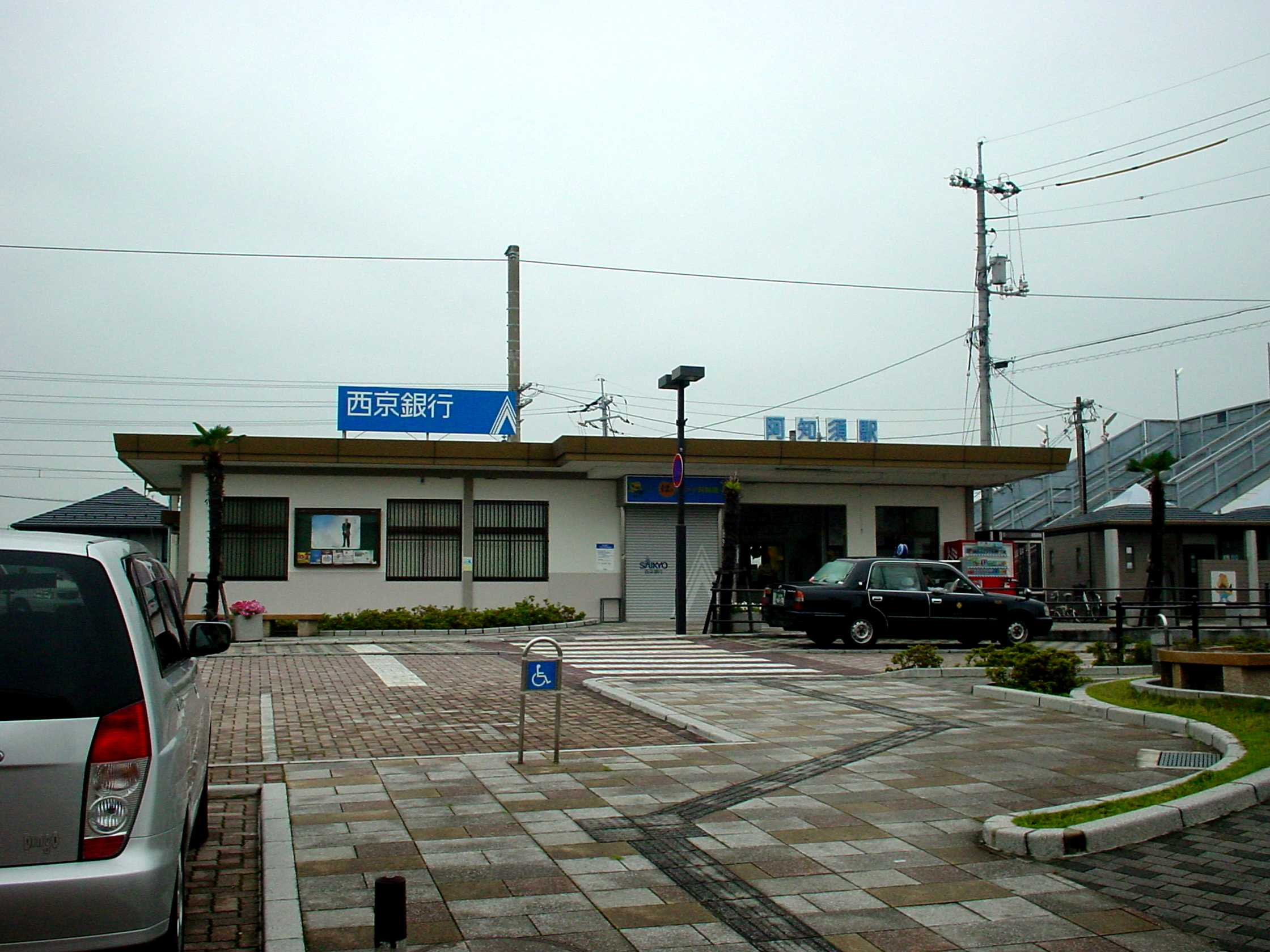
- Ajisu Station in July 2006

General information
- Location: Ajisu 4775, Yamaguchi-shi, Yamaguchi-ken 754-1277; Japan
- Coordinates: 34°0′38.86″N 131°21′24.57″E
- Owner: West Japan Railway Company
- Operator: West Japan Railway Company
- Line: Ube Line
- Distance: 10.2 km (6.3 miles) from Shin-Yamaguchi
- Platforms: 1 island platform
- Tracks: 2
- Connections: Bus stop

Other information
- Status: Staffed
- Website: Official website

History
- Opened: 26 March 1925; 101 years ago
- Former names: Hon-Ajisu (to 1950)

Passengers
- FY2020: 265

Services
Preceding station	JR West	Following station
Iwakura towards Shin-Yamaguchi	Ube Line Local	Kiwa towards Ube
Location
- Location within Yamaguchi Prefecture Location within Japan

Ajisu Station (阿知須駅, Ajisu-eki) is a passenger railway station located in the city of Yamaguchi, Yamaguchi Prefecture, Japan. It is operated by the West Japan Railway Company (JR West).

== Lines ==
Ajisu Station is served by the JR West Ube Line, and is located 10.2 kilometers from the terminus of the line at Shin-Yamaguchi.

== Station layout ==
The station consists of one ground-level island platform connected to the station building by a footbridge. The station is staffed.

=== Platforms ===
1	■ Ube Line	for Ube-Shinkawa and Inō
2	■ Ube Line	for Shin-Yamaguchi

== History ==
Ajisu Station was opened on 26 March 1925 as Hon-Ajisu Station (本阿知須駅) when the Ube Railway was extended from Ogōri Station (present-day Shin-Yamaguchi) to Hon-Ajisu Station (present-day Ajisu Station). The line was nationalized in 1943, becoming the Ube Higashi Line, and was renamed the Ube Line on 1 February 1948. It was renamed on 1 June 1950. With the privatization of the Japan National Railway (JNR) on 1 April 1987, the station came under the aegis of the West Japan railway Company (JR West).

== Passenger statistics ==
In fiscal 2020, the station was used by an average of 265 passengers daily.

== Surrounding area ==
- Yamaguchi City Ajisu General Branch (former Ajisu Town Office)
- Yamaguchi City Ajisu Library
- Yamaguchi Municipal Ajisu Elementary School
- Yamaguchi Municipal Ajisu Junior High School
- Kirara Beach

== See also ==
- List of railway stations in Japan
