= Higashi-Shinkawa Station =

Railway station in Ube, Yamaguchi Prefecture, Japan

Higashi-Shinkawa Station 東新川駅
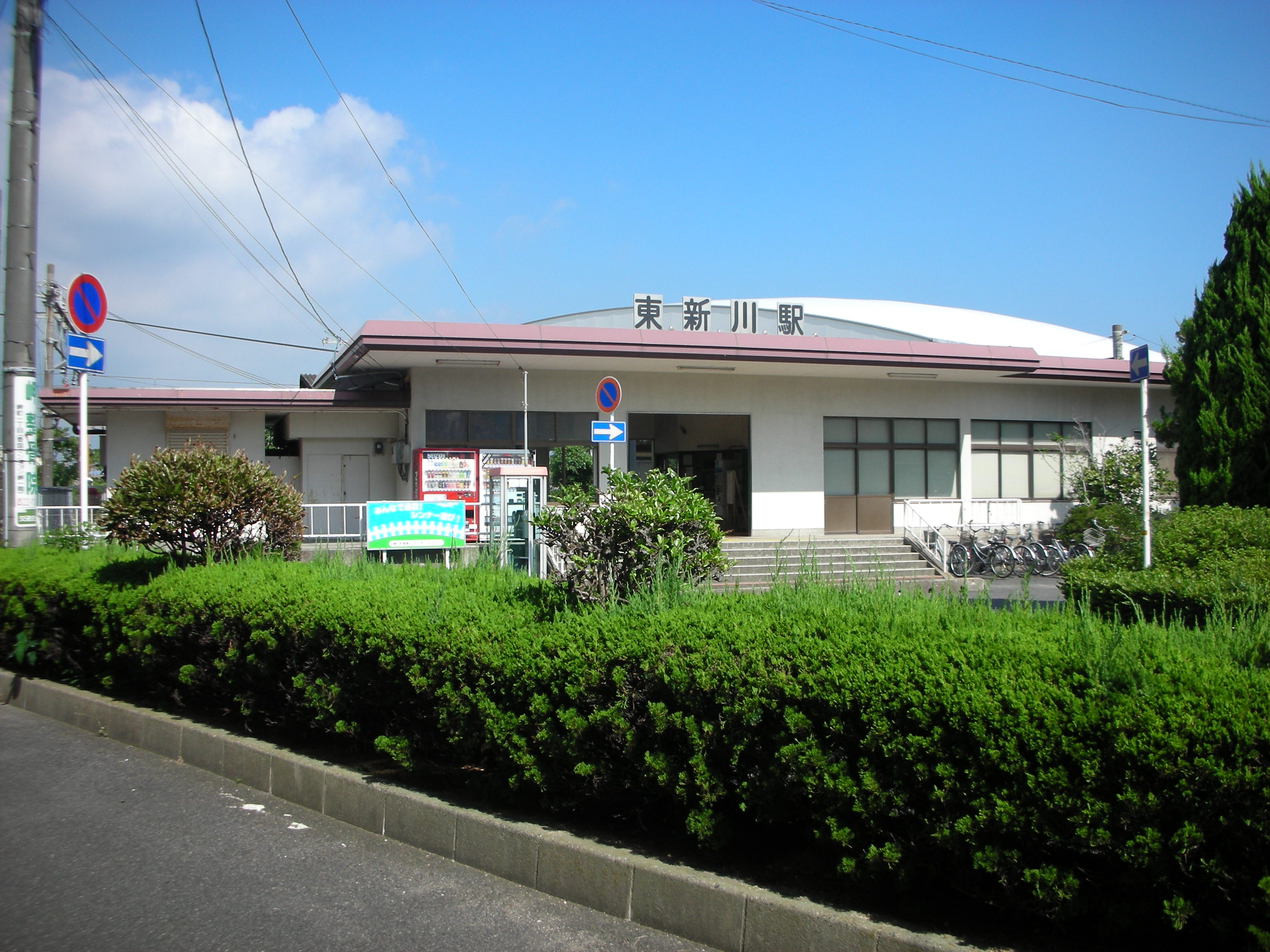
- Higashi-Shinkawa Station in September 2008

General information
- Location: 2-17, Higashishinkawa-chō, Ube-shi, Yamaguchi-ken 755-0019; Japan
- Coordinates: 33°56′54.24″N 131°15′24.84″E
- Owner: West Japan Railway Company
- Operator: West Japan Railway Company
- Line: Ube Line
- Distance: 25.3 km (15.7 miles) from Shin-Yamaguchi
- Platforms: 2 side platform
- Tracks: 2
- Connections: Bus stop

Other information
- Status: Unstaffed
- Website: Official website

History
- Opened: 1 August 1923; 103 years ago

Passengers
- FY2020: 376

Services
| Preceding station | JR West | Following station |
|---|---|---|
| Ubemisaki towards Shin-Yamaguchi | Ube Line Local | Kotoshiba towards Ube |
Location
- Location within Yamaguchi Prefecture Location within Japan

Higashi-Shinkawa Station (東新川駅, Higashi-Shinkawa-eki) is a passenger railway station located in the city of Ube, Yamaguchi Prefecture, Japan. It is operated by the West Japan Railway Company (JR West).

== Lines ==
Higashi-Shinkawa Station is served by the JR West Ube Line, and is located 25.3 kilometers from the terminus of the line at Shin-Yamaguchi.

== Station layout ==
The station consists of two ground-level unnumbered side platforms connected to the station building by a footbridge. The station is unattended.

=== Platforms ===
| station side | ■ Ube Line | for Ube-Shinkawa, Inō and Ube |
| opposite side | ■ Ube Line | for Tokoname and Shin-Yamaguchi |

== History ==
Higashi-Shinkawa Station was opened on 1 August 1923 when the Ube Railway was extended from Tokoname to Ube-Shinkawa. The line was nationalized in 1943, becoming the Ube Higashi Line, and was renamed the Ube Line on 1 February 1948. With the privatization of the Japan National Railway (JNR) on 1 April 1987, the station came under the aegis of the West Japan railway Company (JR West).

== Passenger statistics ==
In fiscal 2020, the station was used by an average of 376 passengers daily.

== Surrounding area ==
- Chuo Park (directly connected to the station)
- Yamaguchi Prefectural Ube Central High School

== See also ==
- List of railway stations in Japan
