= Iwakura Station (Yamaguchi) =

Railway station in Yamaguchi, Yamaguchi Prefecture, Japan

Iwakura Station 岩倉駅
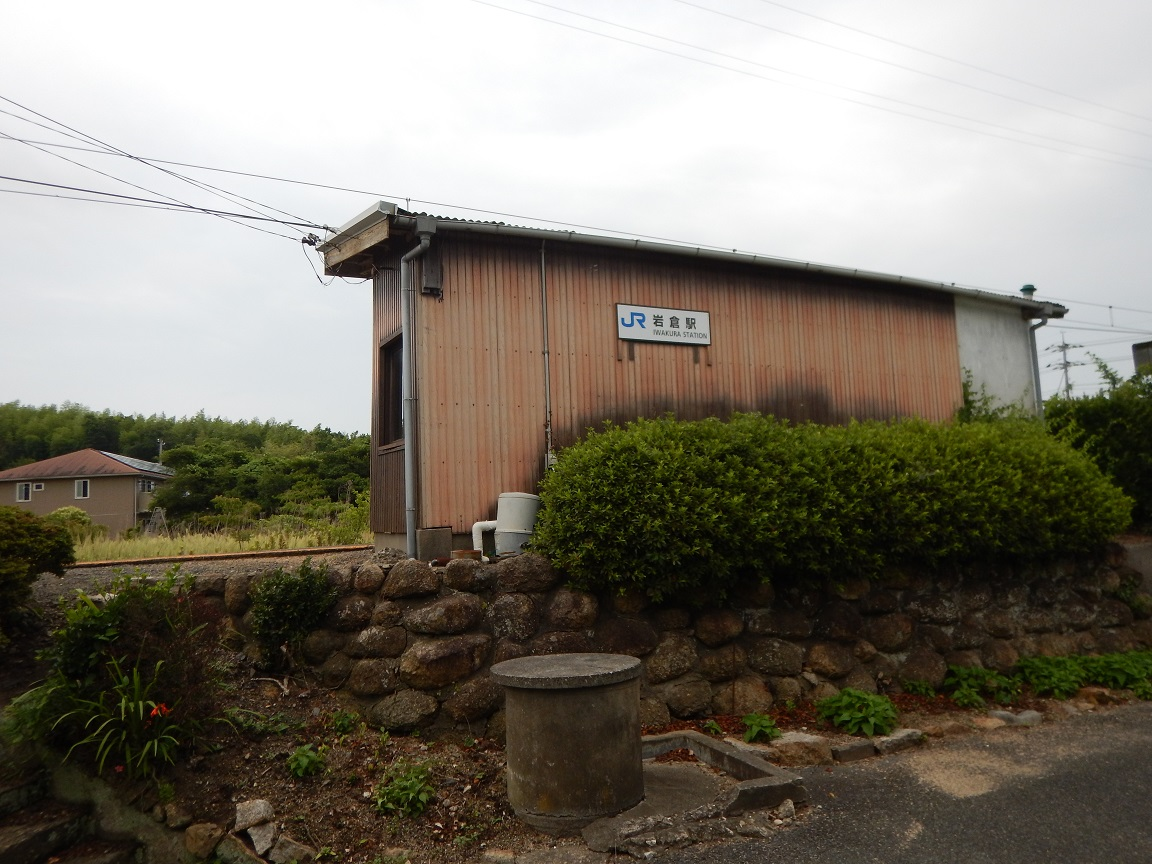
- Iwakura Station in June 2019

General information
- Location: 714 Ajisu, Yamaguchi-shi, Yamaguchi-ken 754-1277; Japan
- Coordinates: 34°1′24.35″N 131°21′35.92″E
- Owner: West Japan Railway Company
- Operator: West Japan Railway Company
- Line: Ube Line
- Distance: 8.8 km (5.5 miles) from Shin-Yamaguchi
- Platforms: 1 side platform
- Tracks: 1
- Connections: Bus stop

Other information
- Status: Unstaffed
- Website: Official website

History
- Opened: 15 August 1953; 73 years ago

Passengers
- FY2020: 18

Services
| Preceding station | JR West | Following station |
|---|---|---|
| Suō-Sayama towards Shin-Yamaguchi | Ube Line Local | Ajisu towards Ube |
Location
- Location within Yamaguchi Prefecture Location within Japan

Iwakura Station (岩倉駅, Iwakura-eki) is a passenger railway station located in the city of Yamaguchi, Yamaguchi Prefecture, Japan. It is operated by the West Japan Railway Company (JR West).

== Lines ==
Iwakura Station is served by the JR West Ube Line, and is located 8.8 kilometers from the terminus of the line at Shin-Yamaguchi.

== Station layout ==
The station consists of one ground-level side platform serving a single bi-directional track. There is no station building, but only a small shelter on the platform, and the station is unattended.

== History ==
Iwakura Station was opened on 26 March 1925 as a temporary stop when the Ube Railway was extended from Ogōri Station (present-day Shin-Yamaguchi) to Hon-Ajisu Station (present-day Ajisu Station). The line was nationalized in 1943, becoming the Ube Higashi Line, and was renamed the Ube Line on 1 February 1948. the stop was moved 100 meters and officially elevated in status to a full passenger station on 15 August 1953. With the privatization of the Japan National Railway (JNR) on 1 April 1987, the station came under the aegis of the West Japan railway Company (JR West).

== Passenger statistics ==
In fiscal 2020, the station was used by an average of 18 passengers daily.

== Surrounding area ==
- Yamaguchi Prefectural Kirarahama Nature Observation Park
- Yamaguchi Kirara Expo Memorial Park
- Japan National Route 190

== See also ==
- List of railway stations in Japan
