= Kusae Station =

Railway station in Ube, Yamaguchi Prefecture, Japan

Kusae Station 草江駅
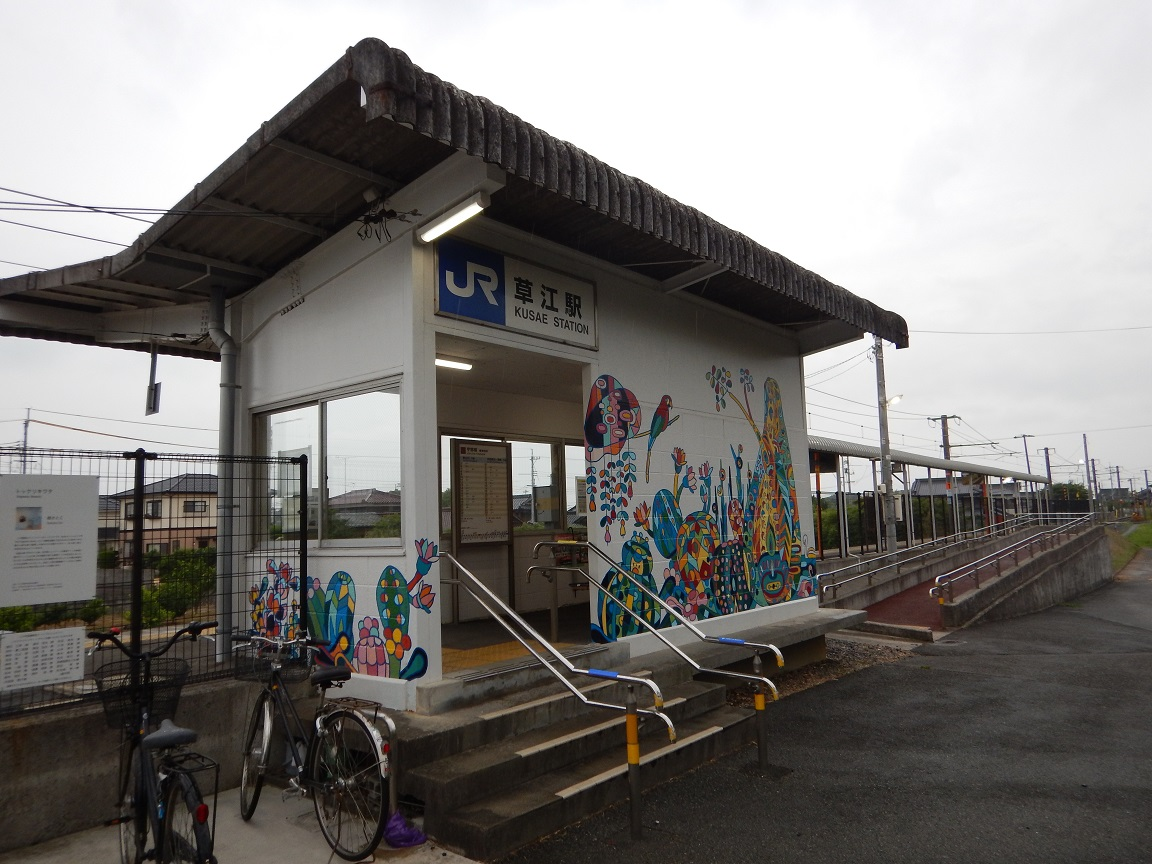
- Kusae Station in June 2019

General information
- Location: 3-chōme-5 Kusae, Ube-shi, Yamaguchi-ken 755-0004; Japan
- Coordinates: 33°56′12.17″N 131°16′27.11″E
- Owner: West Japan Railway Company
- Operator: West Japan Railway Company
- Line: Ube Line
- Distance: 22.5 km (14.0 miles) from Shin-Yamaguchi
- Platforms: 1 side platform
- Tracks: 1
- Connections: Bus stop

Other information
- Status: Unstaffed
- Website: Official website

History
- Opened: 1 August 1923

Passengers
- FY2020: 70

Services
Preceding station	JR West	Following station
Tokiwa towards Shin-Yamaguchi	Ube Line Local	Ubemisaki towards Ube
Location
- Location within Yamaguchi Prefecture Location within Japan

Kusae Station (草江駅, Kusae-eki) is a passenger railway station located in the city of Ube, Yamaguchi Prefecture, Japan. It is operated by the West Japan Railway Company (JR West).

== Lines ==
Kusae Station is served by the JR West Ube Line, and is located 22.5 kilometers from the terminus of the line at Shin-Yamaguchi.

== Station layout ==
The station consists of one ground-level side platform serving a single bi-directional track. The station is unattended.

== History ==
Kusae Station was opened on 1 August 1921 when the Ube Railway was extended from Tokoname to Ube-Shinkawa. The line was nationalized in 1943, becoming the Ube Higashi Line, and was renamed the Ube Line on 1 February 1948. With the privatization of the Japan National Railway (JNR) on 1 April 1987, the station came under the aegis of the West Japan railway Company (JR West).

== Passenger statistics ==
In fiscal 2020, the station was used by an average of 70 passengers daily.

== Surrounding area ==
- Yamaguchi Ube Airport (8 minutes on foot)

== See also ==
- List of railway stations in Japan
