= Kiwa Station (Yamaguchi) =

Railway station in Ube, Yamaguchi Prefecture, Japan

Kiwa Station 岐波駅
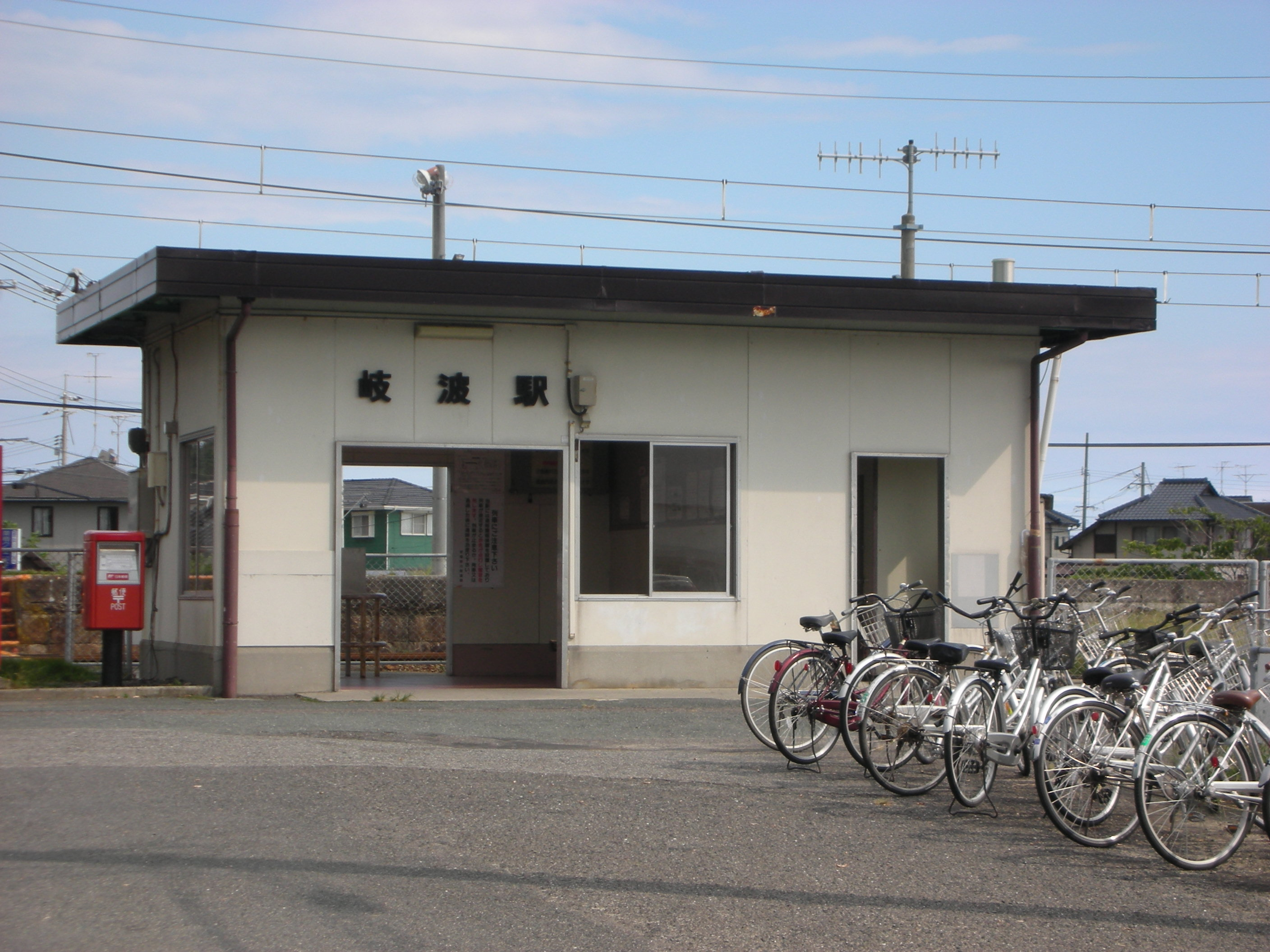
- Kiwa Station in September 2008

General information
- Location: 107 Takahashi, Higashikiwa, Ube-shi, Yamaguchi-ken 755-0241; Japan
- Coordinates: 33°59′24.86″N 131°20′52.53″E
- Owner: West Japan Railway Company
- Operator: West Japan Railway Company
- Line: Ube Line
- Distance: 12.7 km (7.9 miles) from Shin-Yamaguchi
- Platforms: 1 island platform
- Tracks: 2
- Connections: Bus stop

Other information
- Status: Unstaffed
- Website: Official website

History
- Opened: 17 August 1924; 102 years ago

Passengers
- FY2020: 184

Services
Preceding station	JR West	Following station
Ajisu towards Shin-Yamaguchi	Ube Line Local	Maruo towards Ube
Location
- Location within Yamaguchi Prefecture Location within Japan

Kiwa Station (岐波駅, Kiwa-eki) is a passenger railway station located in the city of Ube, Yamaguchi Prefecture, Japan. It is operated by the West Japan Railway Company (JR West).

== Lines ==
Kiwa Station is served by the JR West Ube Line, and is located 12.7 kilometers from the terminus of the line at Shin-Yamaguchi.

== Station layout ==
The station consists of one ground-level unnumbered island platform connected to the station building by a level crossing. The station is unattended.

=== Platforms ===
station side	■ Ube Line	for Shin-Yamaguchi
opposite side	■ Ube Line	for Ube-Shinkawa and Inō

== History ==
Kiwa Station was opened on 17 August 1924 when the Ube Railway was extended from Hon-Ajisu Station (present-day Ajisu Station) to Tokonami. The line was nationalized in 1943, becoming the Ube Higashi Line, and was renamed the Ube Line on 1 February 1948. With the privatization of the Japan National Railway (JNR) on 1 April 1987, the station came under the aegis of the West Japan railway Company (JR West). The station building was renovated in 2020.

== Passenger statistics ==
In fiscal 2020, the station was used by an average of 184 passengers daily.

== Surrounding area ==
- Kiwa Beach

== See also ==
- List of railway stations in Japan
