= Yamaguchi Ube Airport =

Airport in Japan

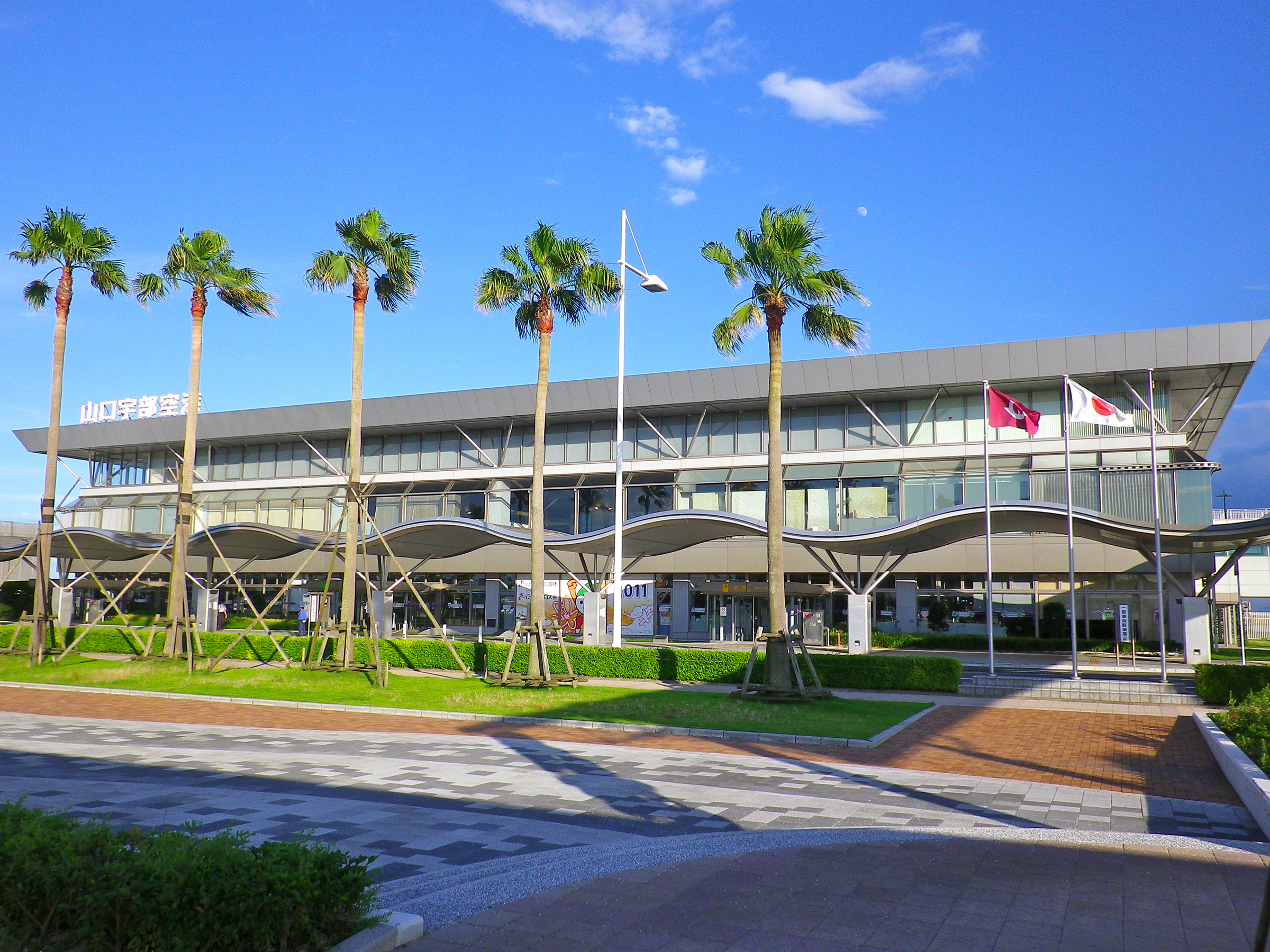
- IATA: UBJ; ICAO: RJDC

Summary
- Airport type: Public
- Serves: Ube
- Location: Ube, Yamaguchi Prefecture, Japan
- Elevation AMSL: 15 ft (4.6 m)
- Coordinates: 33°55′48″N 131°16′43″E

Map
- Location in Yamaguchi Prefecture Location in Japan

Runways
Direction	Length		Surface
Direction	m	ft	Surface
07/25	2,500	8,202	Asphalt

Statistics (2015)
- Passengers: 918,238
- Cargo (metric tonnes): 2,715
- Aircraft movement: 8,624
- Source: Japanese Ministry of Land, Infrastructure, Transport and Tourism

Yamaguchi Ube Airport (山口宇部空港, Yamaguchi Ube Kūkō) (IATA: UBJ, ICAO: RJDC) is a domestic airport located 4.6 km (2.9 mi) southeast of Ube-Shinkawa Station, Ube, Yamaguchi Prefecture, Japan. It is the westernmost airport on the island of Honshu, and is marketed as an alternative to the Kitakyushu Airport for Yamaguchi prefecture residents flying to and from Tokyo.

== History ==
The airport opened in 1966 as Ube Airport with daily propeller service to Haneda (ANA) and Itami (JDA). The airport was renamed to Yamaguchi Ube in 1980 following the introduction of jet service on the Haneda route.

== Facilities ==
The airport has separate domestic and international terminals. There are three gates, two of which are connected to the domestic terminal, and the third of which is connected to both terminals.

== Airlines and destinations ==
The following airlines serve the airport:

Airlines	Destinations
All Nippon Airways	Tokyo–Haneda
J-Air	Tokyo–Haneda
StarFlyer	Tokyo–Haneda

== Ground transportation links ==
The airport is within walking distance of Kusae Station, a small, unstaffed station on the Ube Line with direct scheduled train service to Shin-Yamaguchi Station.

The airport is also linked by bus to Shin-Yamaguchi and to Shimonoseki Station.
