= Tokiwa Station (Yamaguchi) =

Railway station in Ube, Yamaguchi Prefecture, Japan

Tokiwa Station 常磐駅
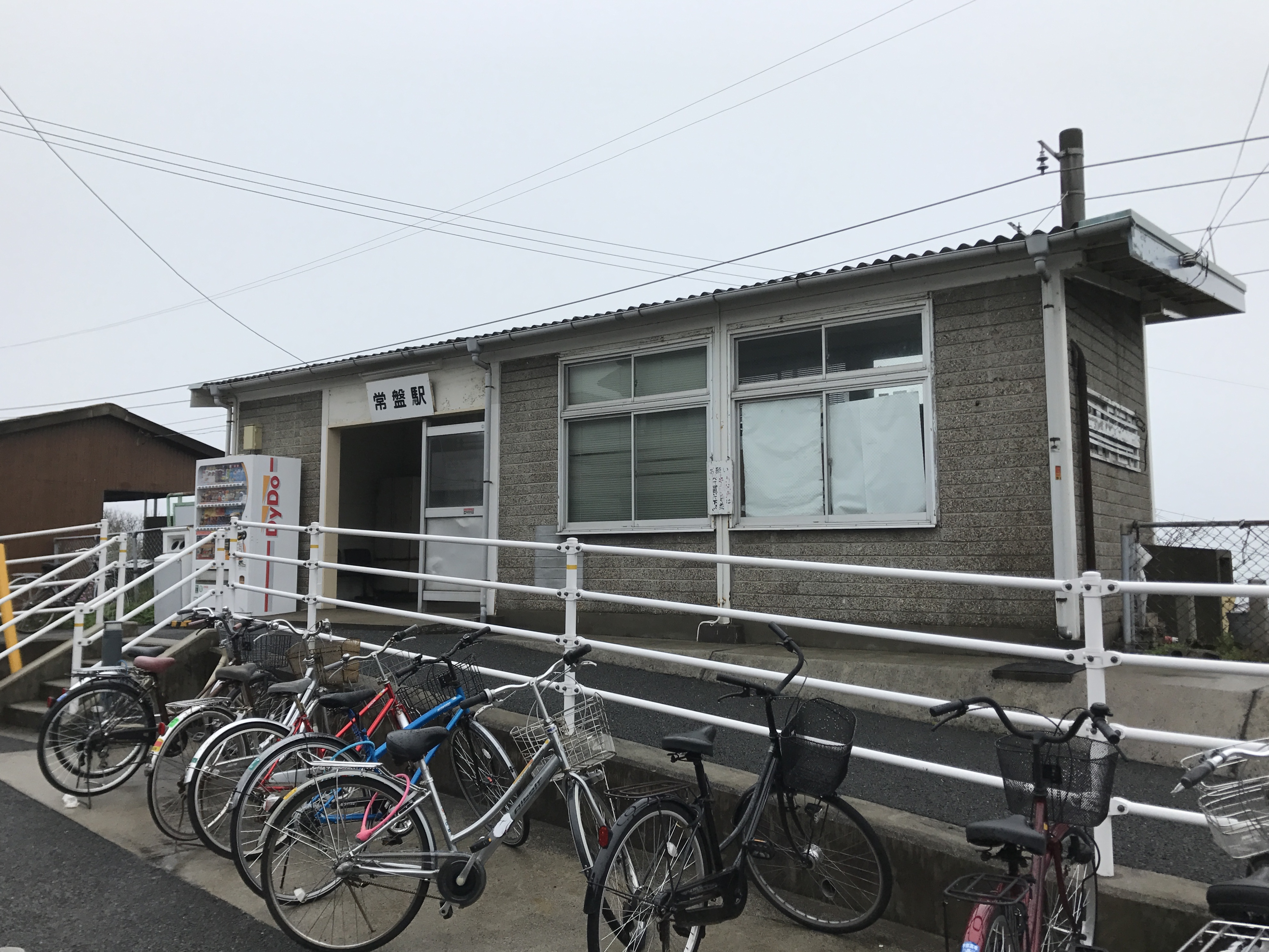
- Tokiwa Station in April 2017

General information
- Location: 1393 Ōsawa, Nishikiwa, Ube-shi, Yamaguchi-ken 755-0151; Japan
- Coordinates: 33°56′26.91″N 131°17′31.74″E
- Owner: West Japan Railway Company
- Operator: West Japan Railway Company
- Line: Ube Line
- Distance: 20.7 km (12.9 miles) from Shin-Yamaguchi
- Platforms: 1 side platform
- Tracks: 1
- Connections: Bus stop

Other information
- Status: Unstaffed
- Website: Official website

History
- Opened: 1 June 1925; 101 years ago

Passengers
- FY2020: 78

Services
| Preceding station | JR West | Following station |
|---|---|---|
| Tokonami towards Shin-Yamaguchi | Ube Line Local | Kusae towards Ube |
Location
- Location within Yamaguchi Prefecture Location within Japan

Tokiwa Station (常盤駅, Tokiwa-eki) is a passenger railway station located in the city of Ube, Yamaguchi Prefecture, Japan. It is operated by the West Japan Railway Company (JR West).

== Lines ==
Tokiwa Station is served by the JR West Ube Line, and is located 20.7 kilometers from the terminus of the line at Shin-Yamaguchi.

== Station layout ==
The station consists of one ground-level side platform serving a single bi-directional track. The station is unattended.

== History ==
Tokiwa Station was opened on 1 June 1925 when the Ube Railway was extended from Tokoname to Kusae. The line was nationalized in 1943, becoming the Ube Higashi Line, and was renamed the Ube Line on 1 February 1948. With the privatization of the Japan National Railway (JNR) on 1 April 1987, the station came under the aegis of the West Japan railway Company (JR West).

== Passenger statistics ==
In fiscal 2020, the station was used by an average of 78 passengers daily.

== Surrounding area ==
- Tokiwa Park
- Japan National Route 190
- Tokiwa Beach

== See also ==
- List of railway stations in Japan
