= Ube, Yamaguchi =

Ube 宇部市
- City
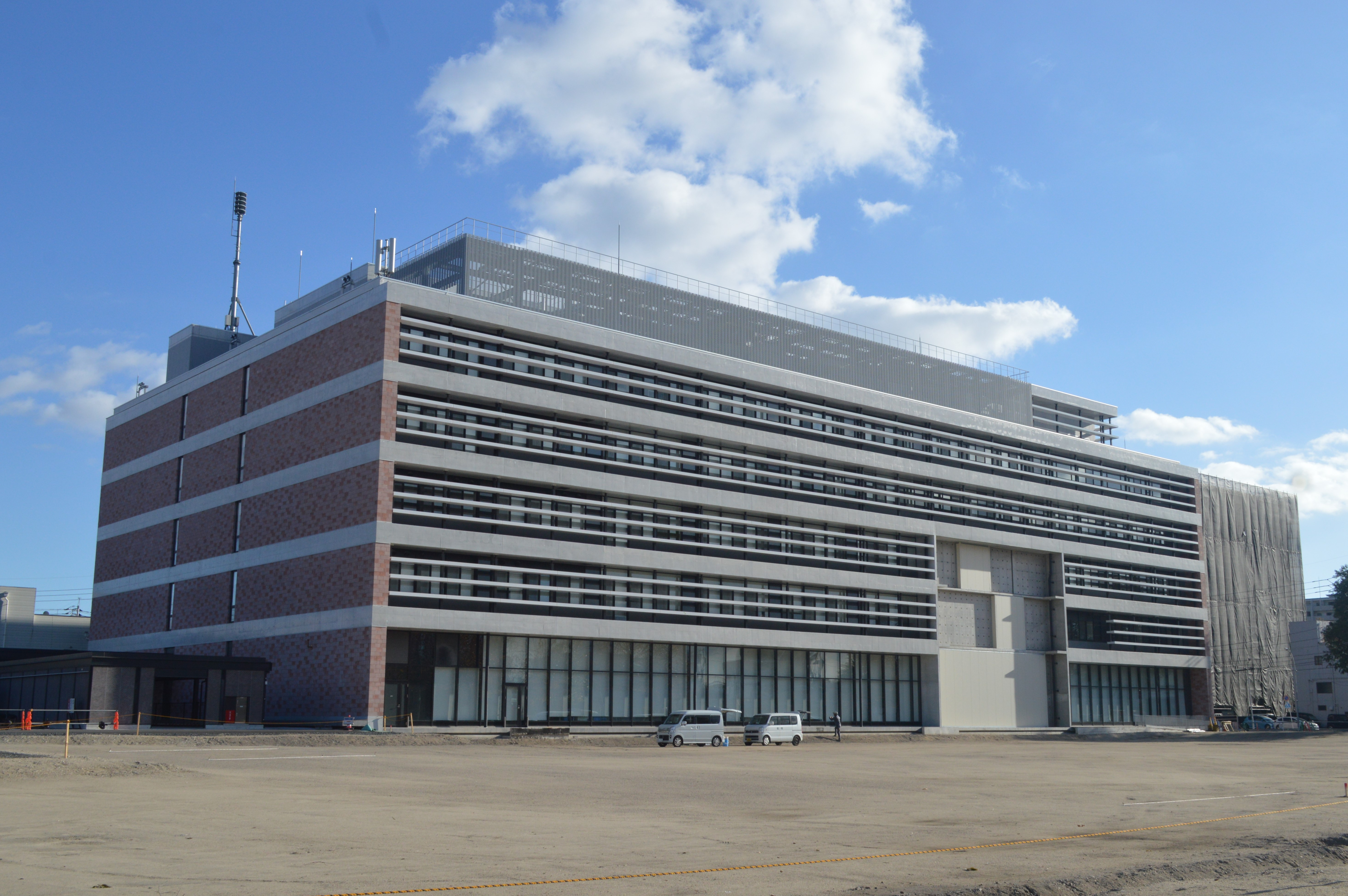
- Ube City Hall

- Flag Emblem
- Interactive map outlining Ube
- Location of Ube in Yamaguchi Prefecture

- Location in Japan
- Coordinates: 33°57′06″N 131°14′48″E
- Country: Japan
- Region: Chūgoku (San'yō)
- Prefecture: Yamaguchi
- Established: November 1, 1921 as Ube City; April 1, 1889 as Ube Village in Asa District

Government
  - Mayor: Keiji Shinozaki

Area
  - Total: 286.65 km^{2} (110.68 sq mi)

Population (May 31, 2023)
  - Total: 159,256
  - Density: 555.58/km^{2} (1,438.9/sq mi)
- Time zone: UTC+09:00 (JST)
- City hall address: 1-7-1 Tokiwachō, Ube-shi, Yamaguchi-ken 755-8601
- Climate: Cfa
- Website: Official website (in Japanese)
- Symbols
- Flower: Scarlet sage and azalea
- Tree: Camphor laurel

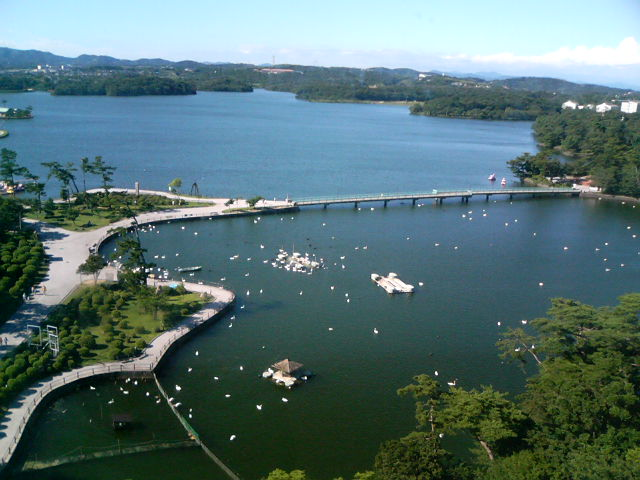
Tokiwa Park

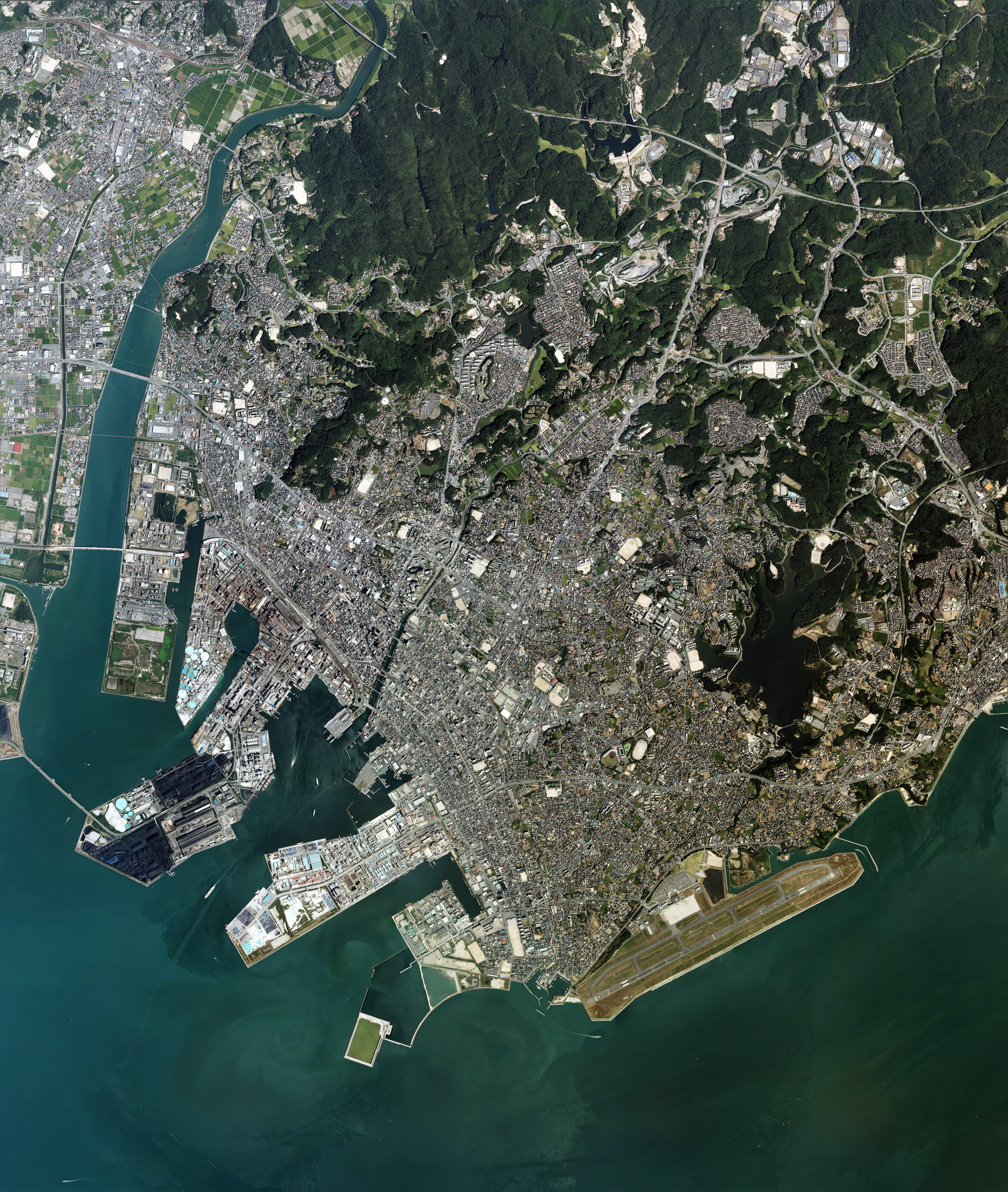
Aerial photo of Ube city center

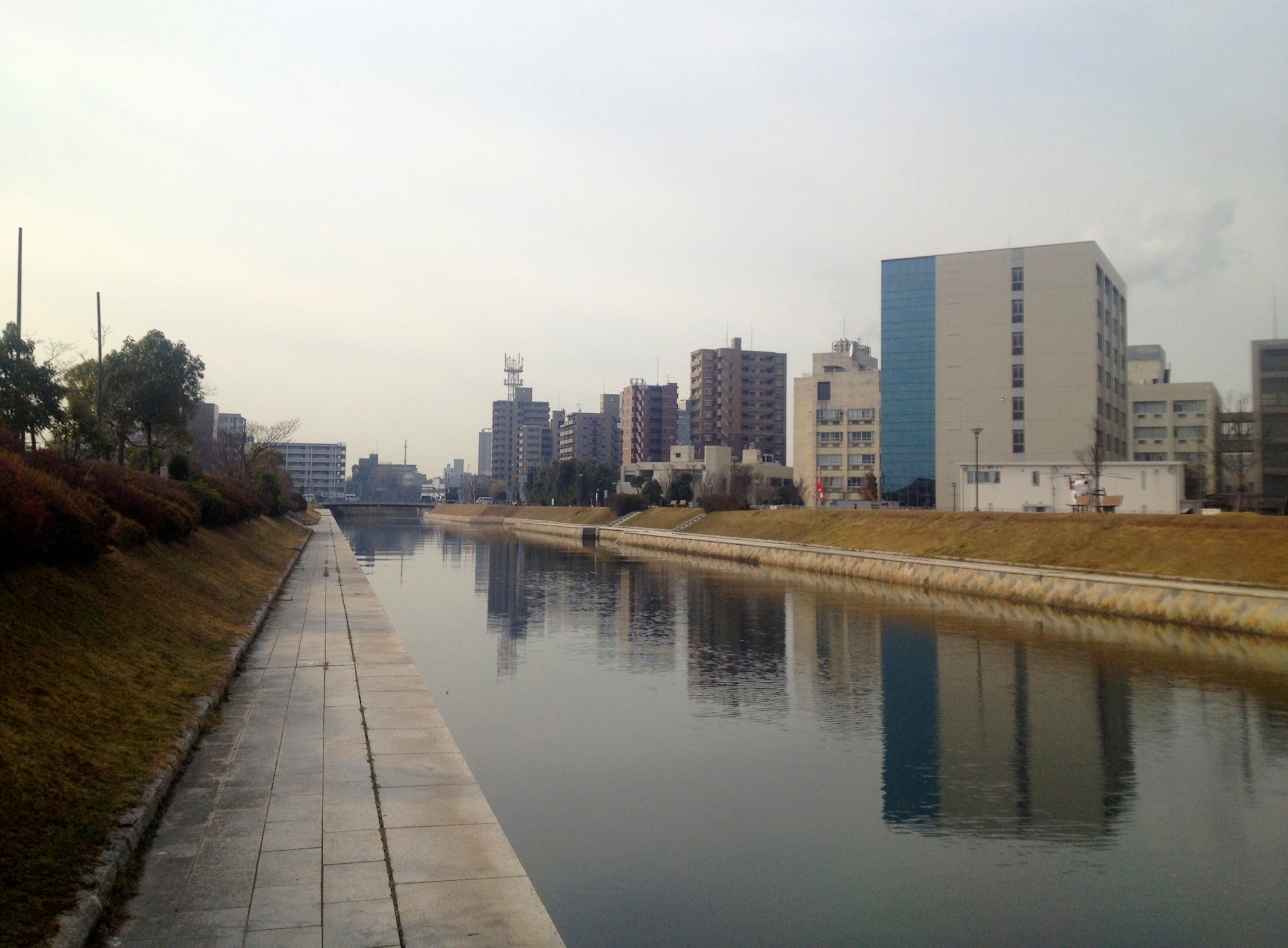
Majimegawa River and central Ube

Ube (宇部市, Ube-shi; Japanese pronunciation: [ɯ̈́.bè̞, ɯ̈̀.bé̞.ɕì]) is a city located in Yamaguchi Prefecture, Japan.

== Geography ==
Ube is located on the Seto Inland Sea in southwestern Yamaguchi Prefecture. The total area of the city is 286.65 square kilometres (110.68 sq mi). The city limits are the lower reaches of the Koto River system and the upper reaches of the Ariho River system, which flows through the central and western part of the prefecture from north to south. The urban area spreads out on the plains on both sides of the Koto River mouth and on the flat land along the coast, forming a densely populated area. Most of the flat land in the south was reclaimed by seabed coalfields, and the place names such as 'Unoshima' and 'Hamacho' are remnants of this. A gentle mountainous area spreads from the central part to the northern part of the city, and in recent years development has been promoted with the construction of industrial parks and new residential areas. In addition, the Konan area in the western part of the city is mostly reclaimed land for the purpose of rice cultivation. The area used to be a rural area with extensive paddy fields, but the area is increasingly urbanized with condominium developments.

=== Neighbouring municipalities ===
Yamaguchi Prefecture

- Mine
- San'yō-Onoda
- Yamaguchi

== Demographics ==
As of 31 May 2023, the city had an estimated population of 159,256 in 80,010 households and a population density of 560 persons per km^{2}.

=== Historical demographics ===
Per Japanese census data, the historical population of Ube is as follows:

Historical population
Year	Pop.	±%
1940	145,151	—
1950	161,472	+11.2%
1960	178,151	+10.3%
1970	161,241	−9.5%
1980	176,620	+9.5%
1990	182,526	+3.3%
2000	182,031	−0.3%
2010	173,678	−4.6%

== History ==
Ube is part of ancient Nagato Province. The Kotozaki Hachiman-gu shrine dates from the Heian period and the local Koto clan, a branch of the Mononobe clan dominated the area into the Kamakura period. The area became part of the holdings of the Ōuchi clan in the Muromachi period and subsequently part of Chōshū Domain under the Mōri clan under the Edo period Tokugawa shogunate. The village of Ube (宇部村) was established within Asa District, Yamaguchi with the creation of the modern municipalities system on April 1, 1889. Ube was elevated directly to city status on November 1, 1921, in a rare direct elevation from village to city.

From April to August 1945, 254 people were killed, 557 were injured, and 68 were missing due to eight air raids during World War II. The scale of the air raid on July 2 was particularly large, and most of the central part of the city was destroyed by fire. In the air raid on July 29, three mock atomic bombs were dropped.

Previously a coal mining town, the city has developed an effective policy to improve its environment. In particular it has combated the problem of air pollution and its success in doing so saw it being recognised by the United Nations Environment Programme as among UNEP's Global 500 Roll of Honour in 1997.

On November 1, 2004, the town of Kusunoki (from Asa District) was merged into Ube. This brought the city to its current extent, together with previous municipal mergers (Fujiyama in 1931, Kōnan in 1941, NishKiwa in 1943, Great Shōwa mergers/1954: Kotō, Futamatase, Ono, Higashi-Kiwa).

== Government ==
Ube has a mayor-council form of government with a directly elected mayor and a unicameral city council of 28 members. Ube contributes five members to the Yamaguchi Prefectural Assembly. In terms of national politics, the city is part of the Yamaguchi 3rd district of the lower house of the Diet of Japan.

== Economy ==
Ube has a heavily industrialized economy centered on heavy industry and chemicals. Ube Industries is headquartered and has major plants in Ube. Also, petroleum refinery Solato, printer manufacturer Riso Kagaku, glass manufacturer Central Glass, semiconductor producer Renesas, pharmaceutical research and products company Kyowa Hakko Kirin, clinical laboratory research company Miraca Holdings are based in Ube.

== Climate ==
Ube has a humid subtropical climate (Köppen climate classification Cfa) with very warm summers and cool winters. The average annual temperature in Ube is 16.2 °C. The average annual rainfall is 1732 mm with September as the wettest month. The temperatures are highest on average in July, at around 27.0 °C, and lowest in January, at around 6.2 °C.

Climate data for Ube (2002−2020 normals, extremes 2002−present)
Month	Jan	Feb	Mar	Apr	May	Jun	Jul	Aug	Sep	Oct	Nov	Dec	Year
Record high °C (°F)	16.6 (61.9)	18.7 (65.7)	24.3 (75.7)	26.6 (79.9)	30.3 (86.5)	32.1 (89.8)	36.1 (97.0)	37.0 (98.6)	35.5 (95.9)	31.0 (87.8)	26.0 (78.8)	22.8 (73.0)	37.0 (98.6)
Mean daily maximum °C (°F)	9.4 (48.9)	10.2 (50.4)	13.3 (55.9)	17.8 (64.0)	22.3 (72.1)	25.2 (77.4)	28.9 (84.0)	30.8 (87.4)	27.7 (81.9)	22.9 (73.2)	17.3 (63.1)	11.7 (53.1)	19.8 (67.6)
Daily mean °C (°F)	5.8 (42.4)	6.5 (43.7)	9.3 (48.7)	13.8 (56.8)	18.4 (65.1)	22.0 (71.6)	25.8 (78.4)	27.5 (81.5)	24.2 (75.6)	18.9 (66.0)	13.4 (56.1)	8.1 (46.6)	16.1 (61.0)
Mean daily minimum °C (°F)	2.0 (35.6)	2.6 (36.7)	5.1 (41.2)	9.8 (49.6)	14.7 (58.5)	19.3 (66.7)	23.6 (74.5)	24.9 (76.8)	21.1 (70.0)	15.0 (59.0)	9.2 (48.6)	4.1 (39.4)	12.6 (54.7)
Record low °C (°F)	−6.1 (21.0)	−4.5 (23.9)	−2.0 (28.4)	2.1 (35.8)	5.5 (41.9)	11.6 (52.9)	17.5 (63.5)	18.5 (65.3)	12.9 (55.2)	4.4 (39.9)	0.8 (33.4)	−4.2 (24.4)	−6.1 (21.0)
Average precipitation mm (inches)	56.2 (2.21)	65.7 (2.59)	106.0 (4.17)	129.0 (5.08)	162.7 (6.41)	242.5 (9.55)	291.1 (11.46)	131.3 (5.17)	133.5 (5.26)	77.9 (3.07)	74.4 (2.93)	57.0 (2.24)	1,527.2 (60.13)
Average precipitation days (≥ 1.0 mm)	8.6	8.9	10.1	9.3	8.6	11.7	10.3	7.8	8.3	5.7	7.9	8.6	105.8
Source: Japan Meteorological Agency

== Education ==
=== Universities ===
- Ube Frontier University (private)
- Yamaguchi University (national)
  - Faculty of Engineering
  - School of Medicine

=== Primary and secondary schools ===
Ube has 24 public elementary school and 12 public junior high schools operated by the city government, and five public high schools operated by the Yamaguchi Prefectural Board of Education. There is also one private junior high school and four private high schools. The prefecture also operates one special education school for the handicapped.

The city formerly had a North Korean school, Ube Korean Elementary and Junior High School (宇部朝鮮初中級学校).

== Transportation ==
=== Airport ===
- Yamaguchi-Ube Airport

=== Railway ===
JR West (JR West) - San'yō Main Line

- Kotō - Ube

JR West (JR West) - Ube Line

- Kiwa - Maruo - Tokonami - Tokiwa - Kusae - Ubemisaki - Higashi-Shinkawa - Kotoshiba - Ube-Shinkawa - Inō - Iwahana - Ube

JR West (JR West) - Onoda Line

- Inō - Tsumazaki - Nagato-Nagasawa

=== Highways ===
- San'yō Expressway
- Chugoku Expressway
- National Route 2
- National Route 190
- National Route 490
- National Route 437

== Sister city relations ==
- - Newcastle, New South Wales, Australia, sister city since November 21, 1980
- - Weihai, Shandong, China, friendship city since May 18, 1992
- - Castellón de la Plana, Spain, since April 4, 2019

== Local attractions ==
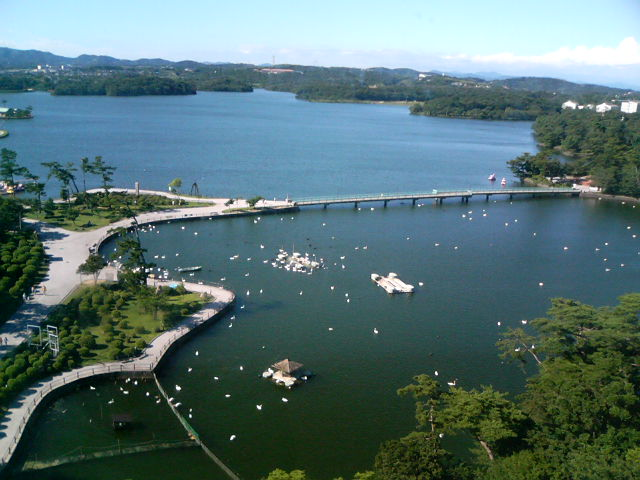
Tokiwa Park from the coal-mining museum tower in the park

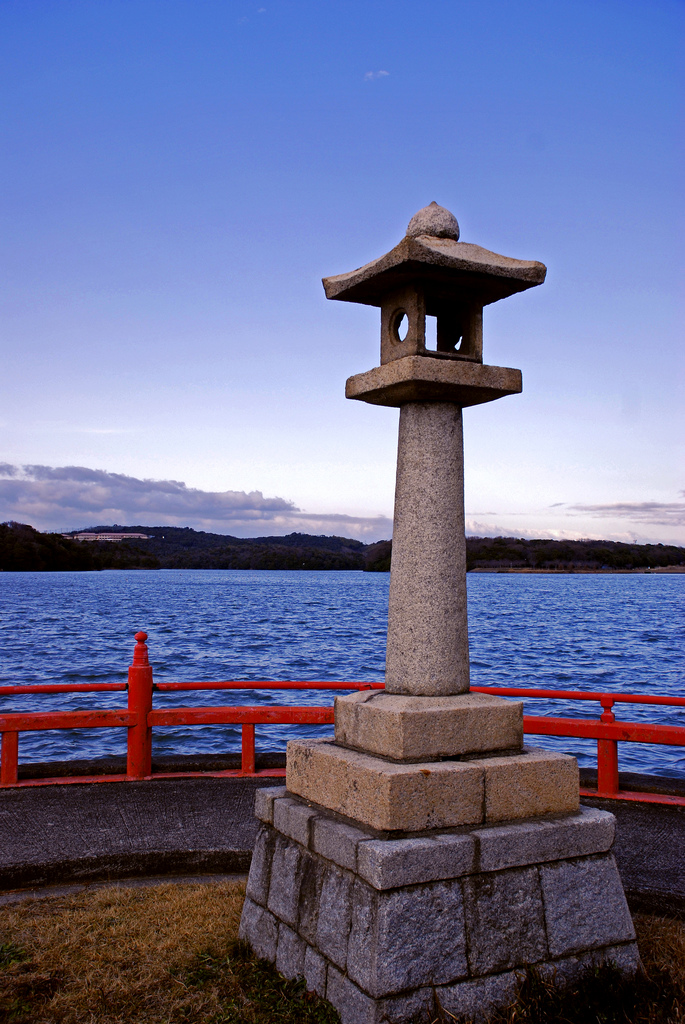
A lamp in Tokiwa Park

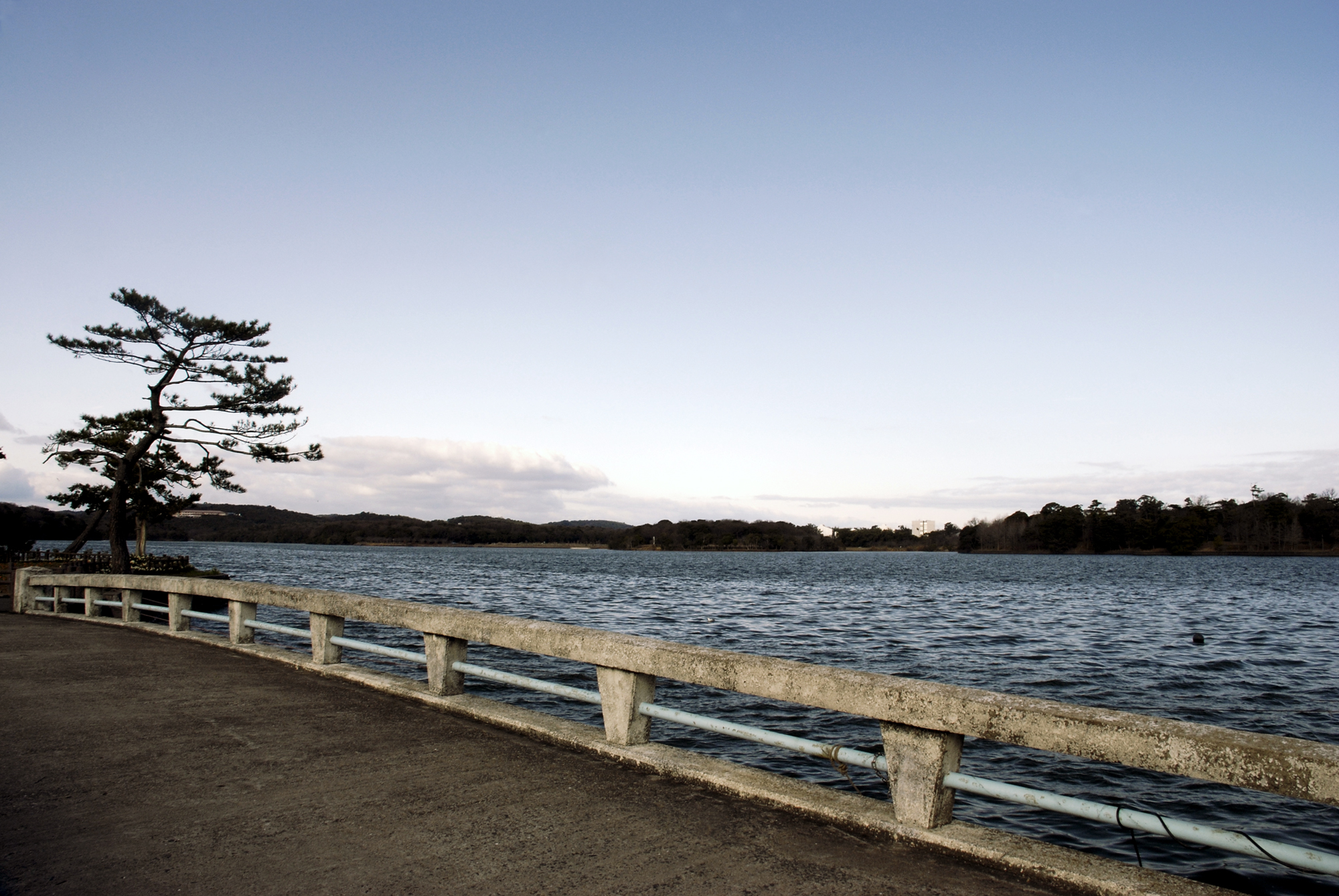
A bridge in Tokiwa Park

Ube publicizes itself as "a city of greenery, flowers, and sculptures". Tokiwa Park is the centerpiece of this marketing, as it covers a large area near the center of the city and houses a large number of modern, mostly domestic sculptures on the shores of Lake Tokiwa. The sculptures can be found around the city. A sculpture competition is held biennially to provide new additions.

A well-known attraction of the park was a great white pelican called "Katta-kun", so named after his parents who were from Kolkata, India. Hatched in the park in 1985, he became famous as he began visiting schools in the vicinity. Katta-kun died in 2008, but there are a number of pelicans still residing in an enclosure there. In addition to the pelicans there were many mute swans and black swans residing there until 2011, when they were culled after an outbreak of H1N5 avian influenza. Two new mute swans were introduced in 2017.

There is a coal mining museum with a view over the city and airport.

=== Festivals ===
Ube holds two festivals each year, one in May and the other in November featuring food stands and carnival games.

== Notable people from Ube ==
- Norihiro Akimura, baseball player
- Hideaki Anno, animator and film director
- Ayase, musician (Yoasobi)
- Kazuo Hara, documentary film director
- Hitomi Harada, voice actress and singer
- Makiko Horai, volleyball player
- Naoto Kan, former prime minister of Japan
- Masaki Kito, attorney at law
- Shunsuke Kiyokiba, pop singer (formerly vocalist of Exile)
- Aimi Kobayashi, pianist
- Sayumi Michishige, pop singer (former Morning Musume member)
- Yuji Nakagawa, soccer player
- Satomi', pop singer
- Ryota Takasugi, soccer player
- Kishō Taniyama, voice actor
- Daisuke Tomita, soccer player
- Yoji Yamada, film director
- Tadashi Yanai, founder and president of Uniqlo
- Sotaro Yasunaga, soccer player
