= Ubemisaki Station =

Railway station in Ube, Yamaguchi Prefecture, Japan

Ubemisaki Station 宇部岬駅
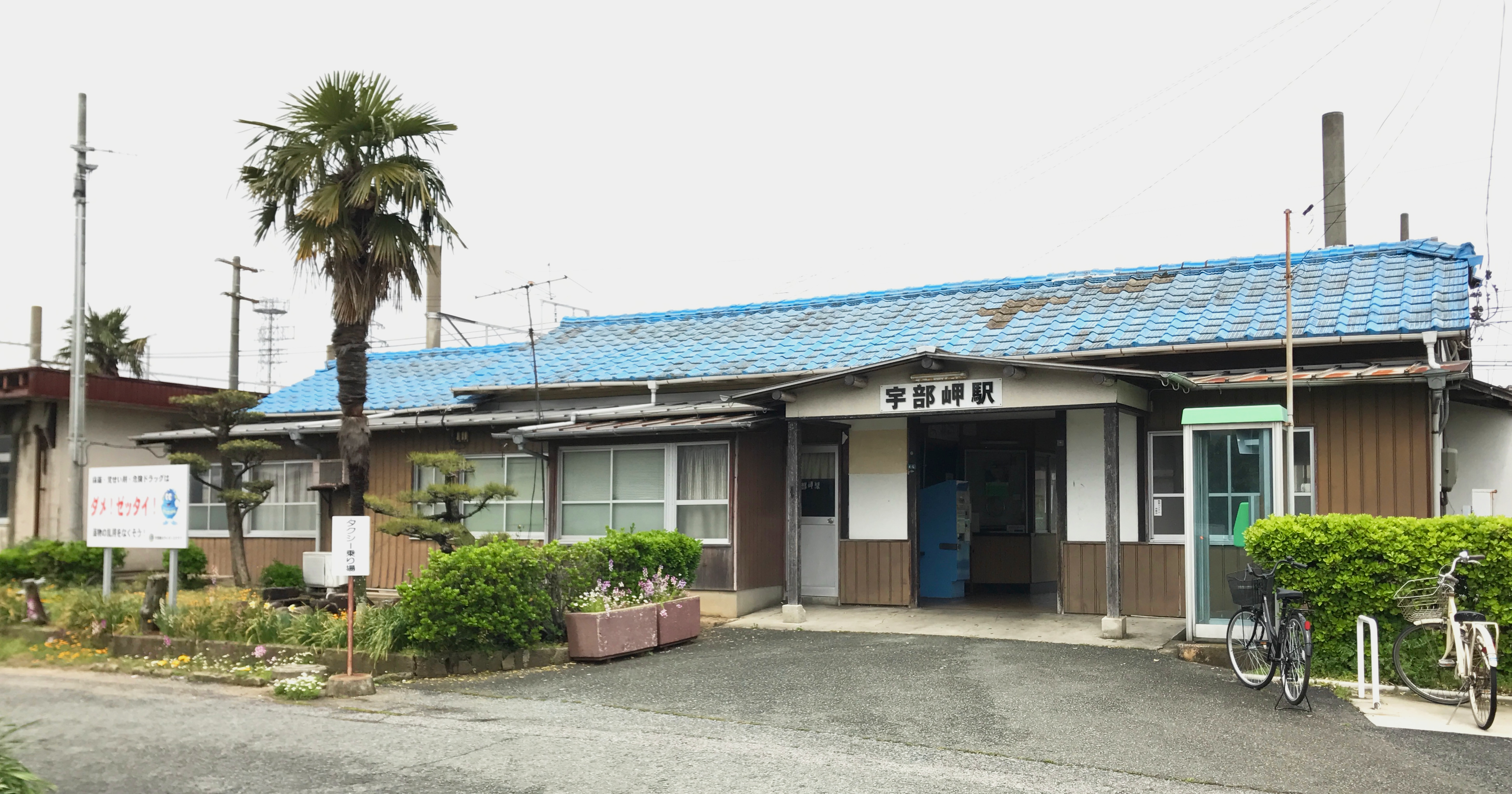
- Ubemisaki Station in September 2017

General information
- Location: 5-chōme-4 Matsuyamachō, Ube-shi, Yamaguchi-ken 755-0026; Japan
- Coordinates: 33°56′4.8″N 131°15′43.74″E
- Owner: West Japan Railway Company
- Operator: West Japan Railway Company
- Line: Ube Line
- Distance: 23.7 km (14.7 miles) from Shin-Yamaguchi
- Platforms: 2 side platforms
- Tracks: 2
- Connections: Bus stop

Other information
- Status: Unstaffed
- Website: Official website

History
- Opened: 1 August 1923; 103 years ago

Passengers
- FY2020: 162

Services
Preceding station	JR West	Following station
Kusae towards Shin-Yamaguchi	Ube Line Local	Higashi-Shinkawa towards Ube
Location
- Location within Yamaguchi Prefecture Location within Japan

Ubemisaki Station (宇部岬駅, Ubemisaki-eki) is a passenger railway station located in the city of Ube, Yamaguchi Prefecture, Japan. It is operated by the West Japan Railway Company (JR West).

== Lines ==
Ubemisaki Station is served by the JR West Ube Line, and is located 23.7 kilometers from the terminus of the line at Shin-Yamaguchi.

== Station layout ==
The station consists of two ground-level opposed side platforms connected to the station building by a footbridge. The station is unattended.

=== Platforms ===
1	■ Ube Line	for Ube-Shinkawa and Ube
2	■ Ube Line	for Tokoname and Shin-Yamaguchi

== History ==
Ubemisaki Station was opened on 1 August 1923 when the Ube Railway was extended from Tokoname to Ube-Shinkawa. The line was nationalized in 1943, becoming the Ube Higashi Line, and was renamed the Ube Line on 1 February 1948. With the privatization of the Japan National Railway (JNR) on 1 April 1987, the station came under the aegis of the West Japan railway Company (JR West).

== Passenger statistics ==
In fiscal 2020, the station was used by an average of 162 passengers daily.

== Surrounding area ==
- Ube Municipal Misaki Elementary School

== See also ==
- List of railway stations in Japan
