= Iwahana Station =

Railway station in Ube, Yamaguchi Prefecture, Japan

Iwahana Station 岩鼻駅
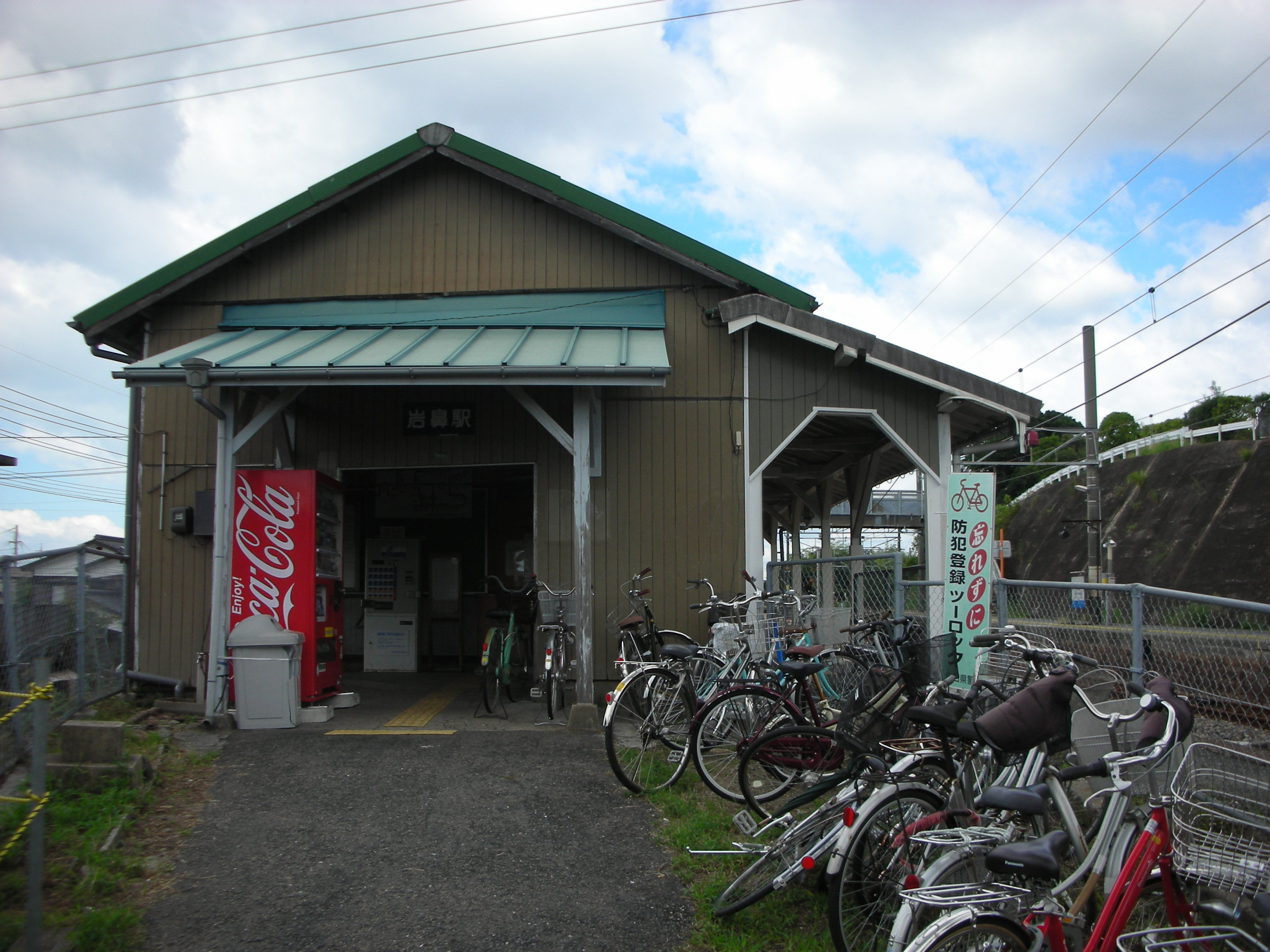
- Iwahana Station in September 2008

General information
- Location: 1 Iwahanachō, Ube-shi, Yamaguchi-ken 755-0810; Japan
- Coordinates: 33°58′43.01″N 131°13′31.49″E
- Owner: West Japan Railway Company
- Operator: West Japan Railway Company
- Line: Ube Line
- Distance: 30.3 km (18.8 miles) from Shin-Yamaguchi
- Platforms: 2 side platforms
- Tracks: 2
- Connections: Bus stop

Other information
- Status: Unstaffed
- Website: Official website

History
- Opened: 9 January 1914

Passengers
- FY2020: 197

Services
Preceding station	JR West	Following station
Inō towards Shin-Yamaguchi	Ube Line Local	Ube Terminus
Location
- Location within Yamaguchi Prefecture Location within Japan

Iwahana Station (岩鼻駅, Iwahana-eki) is a passenger railway station located in the city of Ube, Yamaguchi Prefecture, Japan. It is operated by the West Japan Railway Company (JR West).

== Lines ==
Iwahana Station is served by the JR West Ube Line, and is located 30.3 kilometers from the terminus of the line at Shin-Yamaguchi.

== Station layout ==
The station consists of two ground-level unnumbered opposed side platform and one island platform connected to the station building by a footbridge. The station is not staffed.

=== Platforms ===
station side	■ Ube Line	for Ube, Inō and Shimonoseki
opposite side	■ Ube Line	for Ube-Shinkawa

== History ==
Iwahana Station was opened on 9 January 1914 with the opening of the Ube Railway. The line was nationalized in 1943, becoming the Ube Higashi Line, and the line was renamed Ube Line on 1 February 1948. With the privatization of the Japan National Railway (JNR) on 1 April 1987, the station came under the aegis of the West Japan railway Company (JR West).

== Passenger statistics ==
In fiscal 2020, the station was used by an average of 197 passengers daily.

== Surrounding area ==
- Ube Frontier University/Ube Frontier University Junior College Division
- Ube Frontier University Junior High School/Kagawa High School

== See also ==
- List of railway stations in Japan
