= Kiwa Station =

Kiwa Station is the name of two train stations in Japan:

1. Kiwa Station (Wakayama) (紀和駅)
2. Kiwa Station (Yamaguchi) (岐波駅)
