= Kami-Kagawa Station =

Railway station in Yamaguchi, Yamaguchi Prefecture, Japan

Kami-Kagawa Station 上嘉川駅
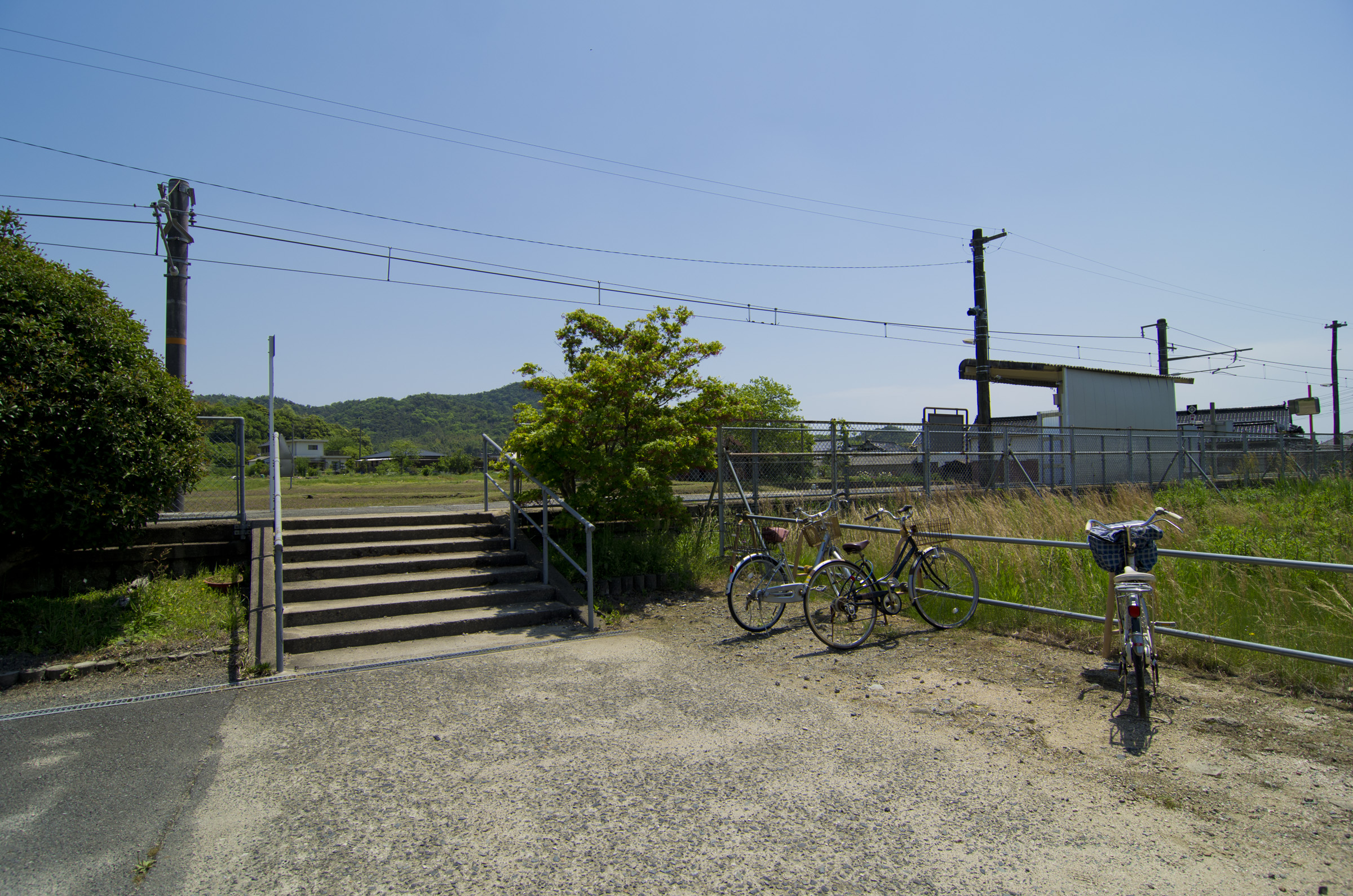
- Kami-Kagawa Station in May 2012

General information
- Location: Kagawa Nonaka 5515, Yamaguchi-shi, Yamaguchi-ken 754-0897; Japan
- Coordinates: 34°4′25.3″N 131°22′44.49″E
- Owner: West Japan Railway Company
- Operator: West Japan Railway Company
- Line: Ube Line
- Distance: 2.8 km (1.7 miles) from Shin-Yamaguchi
- Platforms: 1 side platform
- Tracks: 1
- Connections: Bus stop

Other information
- Status: Unstaffed
- Website: Official website

History
- Opened: 26 March 1925; 101 years ago

Passengers
- FY2020: 60

Services
Preceding station	JR West	Following station
Shin-Yamaguchi Terminus	Ube Line Local	Fukamizo towards Ube
Location
- Location within Yamaguchi Prefecture Location within Japan

Kami-Kagawa Station (上嘉川駅, Kami-Kagawa-eki) is a passenger railway station located in the city of Yamaguchi, Yamaguchi Prefecture, Japan. It is operated by the West Japan Railway Company (JR West).

== Lines ==
Kami-Kagawa Station is served by the JR West Ube Line, and is located 2.8 kilometers from the terminus of the line at Shin-Yamaguchi.

== Station layout ==
The station consists of one ground-level side platform serving a single bi-directional track. There is no station building, but only a small shelter on the platform, and the station is unattended.

== History ==
Kami-Kagawa Station was opened on 26 March 1925 when the Ube Railway was extended from Ogōri Station (present-day Shin-Yamaguchi) to Hon-Ajisu Station (present-day Ajisu Station). The line was nationalized in 1943, becoming the Ube Higashi Line, and was renamed the Ube Line on 1 February 1948. With the privatization of the Japan National Railway (JNR) on 1 April 1987, the station came under the aegis of the West Japan railway Company (JR West).

== Passenger statistics ==
In fiscal 2020, the station was used by an average of 60 passengers daily.

== Surrounding area ==
- JR West Sanyo Main Line Kagawa Station
- Japan National Route 2 / Japan National Route 9 Ogori Road Ohara IC

== See also ==
- List of railway stations in Japan
