= Kusunoki, Yamaguchi =

Dissolved municipality in Yamaguchi prefecture, Japan

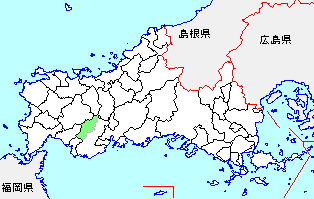
Kusunoki in Yamaguchi Prefecture

Kusunoki (楠町, Kusunoki-chō) was a town located in Asa District, Yamaguchi Prefecture, Japan.

On November 1, 2004, Kusunoki was merged with the expanded city of Ube and no longer exists as an independent municipality.

As of 2003, the town had an estimated population of 7,412 and a density of 96.23 persons per km^{2}. The total area was 77.02 km^{2}.
