= Ube Frontier University =

Coordinates: 33°58′49″N 131°14′02″E

- 宇部フロンティア大学
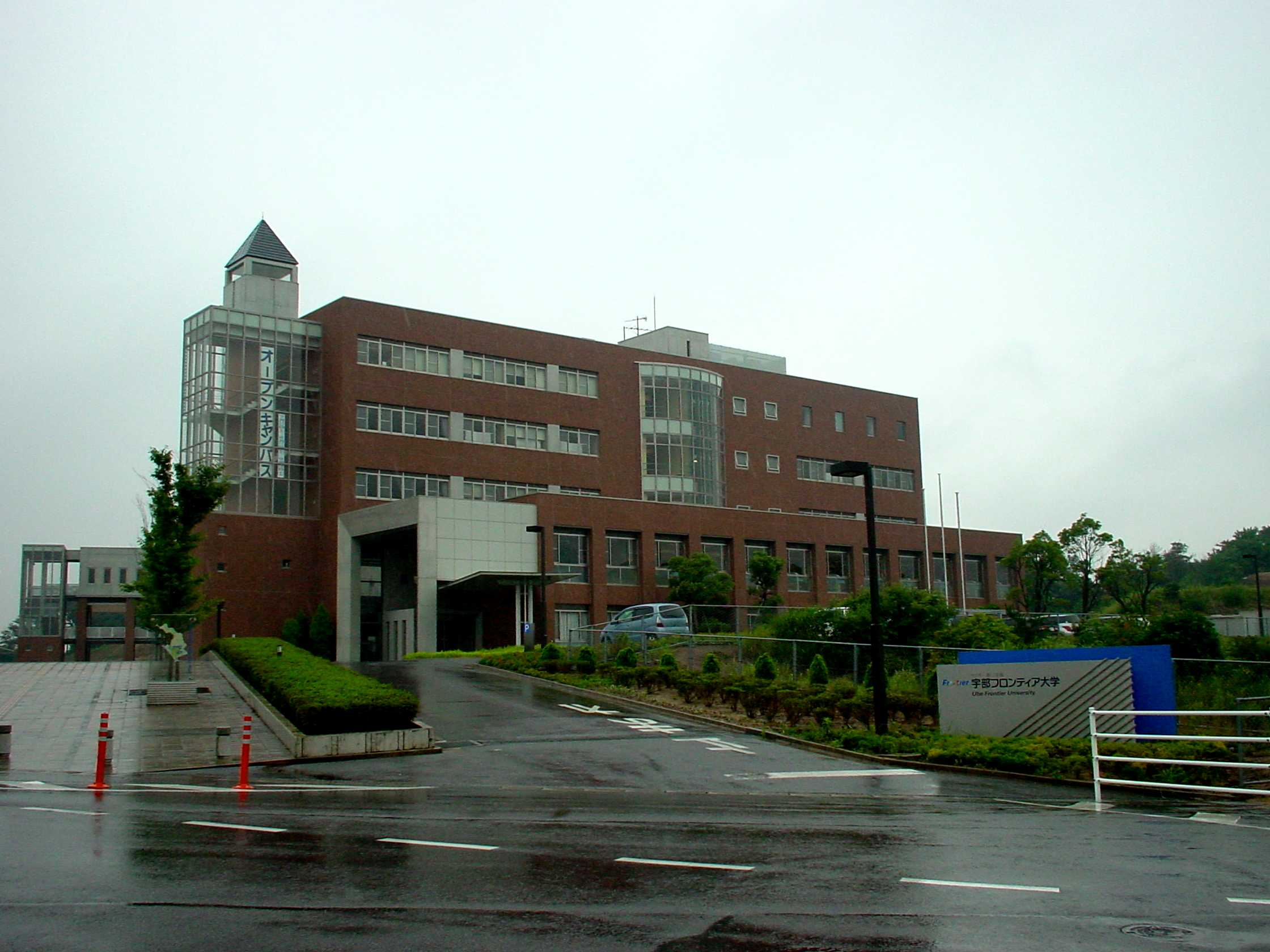
- Type: Private
- Established: 1960
- President: Yuji Nagasaka
- Location: 2-1-1, Bunkyodai, Ube, Yamaguchi, 755-0805, Japan
- Language: Japanese
- Website: www.frontier-u.jp

Ube Frontier University (宇部フロンティア大学, Ube furontia daigaku) is a private university in Ube, Yamaguchi, Japan. After being established as a junior college in 1960, the school became a four-year college in 2002.

== Faculty ==
- Faculty of Psychology
  - Department of Psychology
- Faculty of Human Health
  - Department of Nursing
