= Inō Station (Yamaguchi) =

Railway station in Ube, Yamaguchi Prefecture, Japan

Inō Station 居能駅
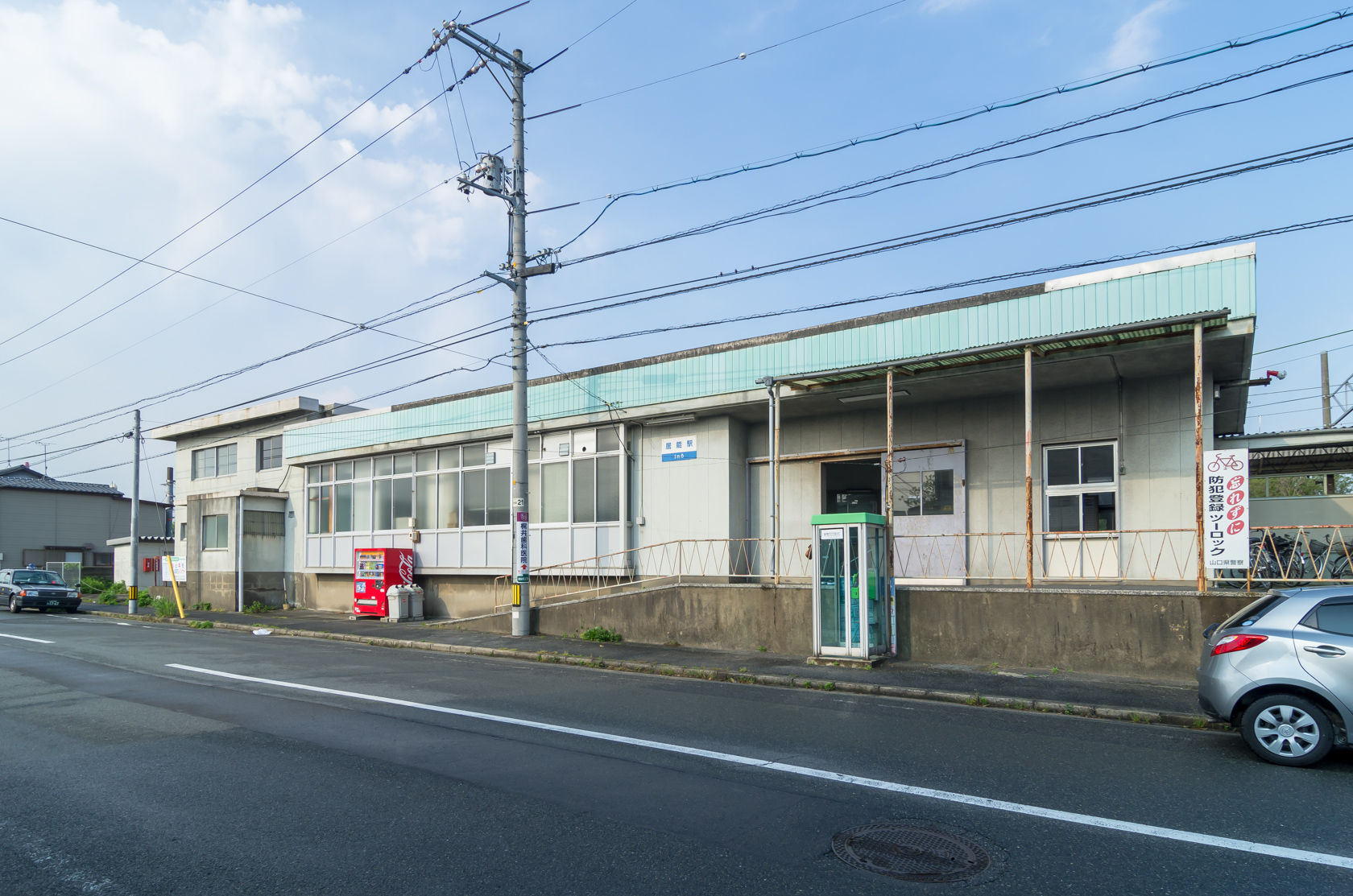
- The station building (May 2012)

General information
- Location: 2-12-13 Ino-cho, Ube-shi, Yamaguchi-ken 755-0057; Japan
- Coordinates: 33°58′1.42″N 131°13′41.38″E
- Owner: West Japan Railway Company
- Operator: West Japan Railway Company
- Line: Ube Line Onoda Line
- Distance: 28.9 km (18.0 miles) from Shin-Yamaguchi
- Platforms: 1 side + 1 island platform
- Tracks: 2
- Connections: Bus stop

Other information
- Status: Unstaffed
- Website: Official website

History
- Opened: May 16, 1929

Passengers
- FY2020: 168

Services
Preceding station	JR West	Following station
Ube-Shinkawa towards Shin-Yamaguchi	Ube Line	Iwahana towards Ube
Ube-Shinkawa Terminus	Onoda Line	Tsumazaki towards Onoda or Nagato-Motoyama
Location
- Location within Yamaguchi Prefecture Location within Japan

Inō Station (居能駅, Inō-eki) is a passenger railway station located in the city of Ube, Yamaguchi Prefecture, Japan. It is operated by the West Japan Railway Company (JR West).

== Lines ==
Inō Station is served by the JR West Ube Line, and is located 28.9 kilometers from the terminus of the line at Shin-Yamaguchi. It is also the official terminus of the 11.6 kilometer Onoda Line continue past for another 1.8 kilometers to terminate at Ube-Shinkawa.

== Station layout ==
The station consists of one side platform and one island platform; however, only one side of the island platform is in use, giving the station a two opposed side platform layout. The station building is located east of the platforms and is connected via a footbridge. The station is unattended.

=== Platforms ===
3	■ Ube Line	for Ube
3	■ Onoda Line	for Suzumeda and Onoda
4	■ Ube Line	for Ube-Shinkawa and Shin-Yamaguchi
4	■ Onoda Line	for Ube-Shinkawa and Shin-Yamaguchi

== History ==
Inō Station was opened on16 May 1929 as a temporary stop and elevated to a full passenger station on 6 November 1938. The line was nationalized in 1943, becoming the Ube Higashi Line, and renamed Ube Line on 1 February 1948. With the privatization of the Japan National Railway (JNR) on 1 April 1987, the station came under the aegis of the West Japan railway Company (JR West).

== Passenger statistics ==
In fiscal 2020, the station was used by an average of 168 passengers daily.

== Surrounding area ==
- Kyowa Hakko Kirin Ube Factory
- Japan National Route 190

== See also ==
- List of railway stations in Japan
