= Ube Line =

Railway line in Yamaguchi prefecture, Japan

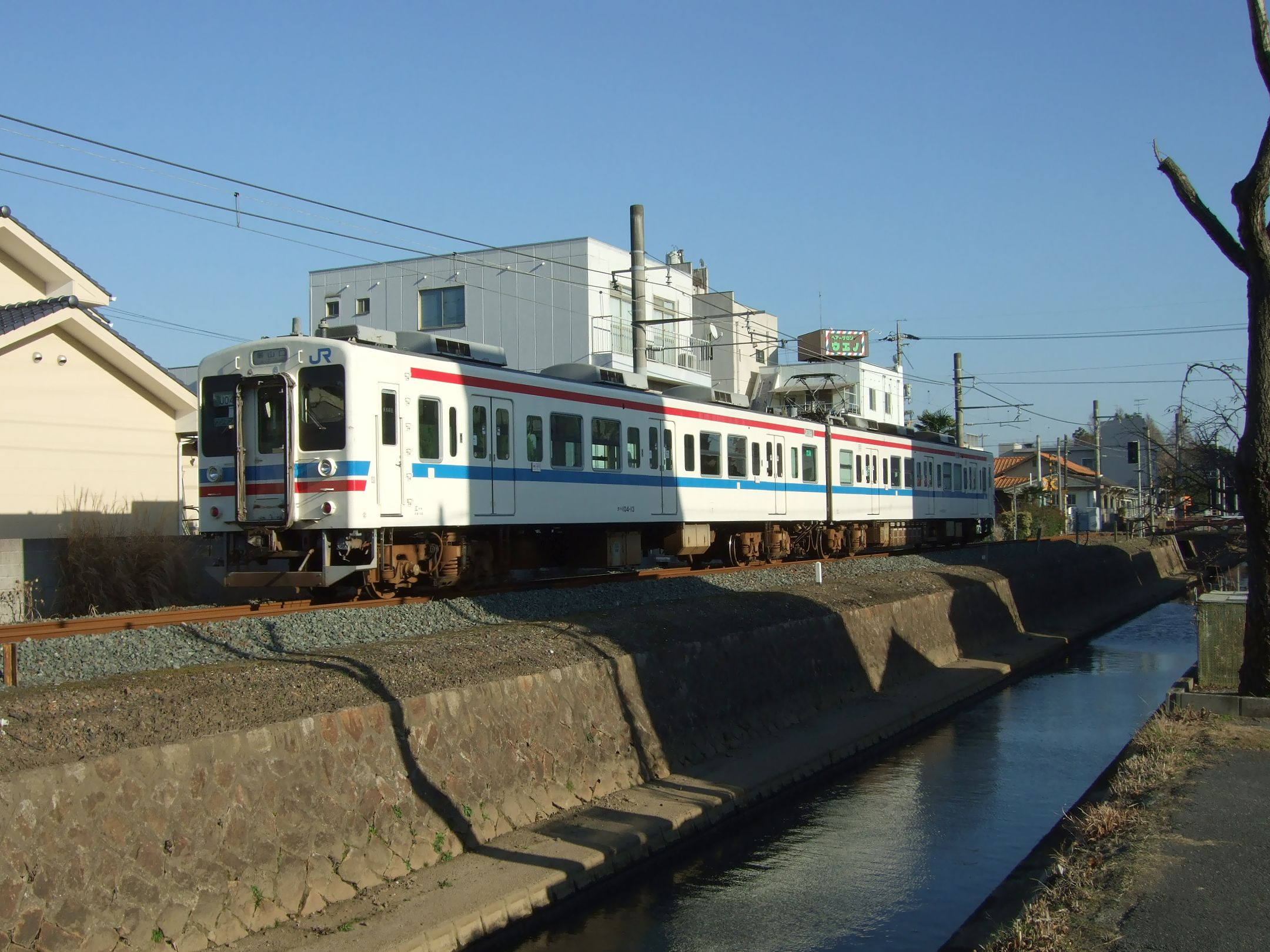
- A JR West 105 series EMU on a local service, January 2010

Overview
- Owner: JR West
- Locale: Yamaguchi Prefecture
- Termini: Shin-Yamaguchi; Ube
- Stations: 18

Service
- Type: Heavy rail

Technical
- Line length: 33.2 km (20.6 mi)
- Track gauge: 1,067 mm (3 ft 6 in)
- Electrification: 1,500 V DC, overhead lines
Route map
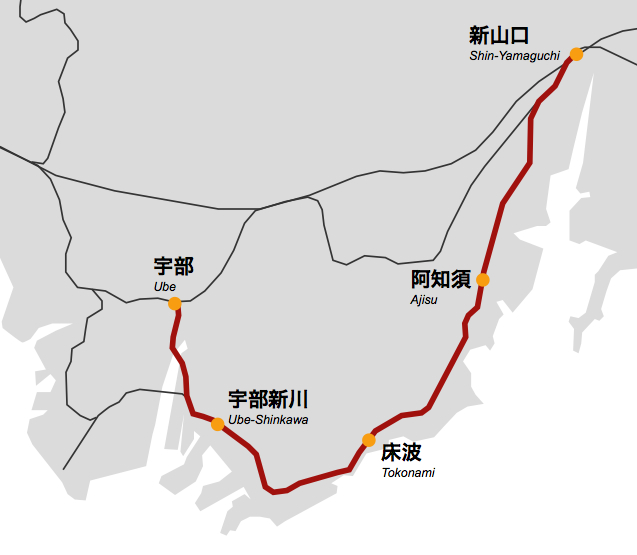

The Ube Line (宇部線, Ube-sen) is a railway line in Yamaguchi Prefecture, Japan, operated by the West Japan Railway Company (JR West). The line connects Shin-Yamaguchi Station in Yamaguchi and Ube Station in Ube.

== Stations ==
All stations are in Yamaguchi Prefecture.

Name		Distance (km)	Transfers	Location
Shin-Yamaguchi	新山口	0.0	Sanyō Shinkansen; Sanyō Main Line, Yamaguchi Line	Yamaguchi
Kami-Kagawa	上嘉川	2.8		Yamaguchi
Fukamizo	深溝	5.9		Yamaguchi
Suō-Sayama	周防佐山	7.5		Yamaguchi
Iwakura	岩倉	8.8		Yamaguchi
Ajisu	阿知須	10.2		Yamaguchi
Kiwa	岐波	12.7		Ube
Maruo	丸尾	15.2		Ube
Tokonami	床波	18.9		Ube
Tokiwa	常盤	20.7		Ube
Kusae	草江	22.5		Ube
Ubemisaki	宇部岬	23.7		Ube
Higashi-Shinkawa	東新川	25.3		Ube
Kotoshiba	琴芝	26.0		Ube
Ube-Shinkawa	宇部新川	27.1		Ube
Inō	居能	28.9	Onoda Line (through service from Ube-Shinkawa)	Ube
Iwahana	岩鼻	30.3		Ube
Ube	宇部	33.2	Sanyō Main Line	Ube

== Rolling stock ==
- 105 series 2-car EMUs
- 123 series single-car EMUs

== History ==
The Ube Light Railway Co. opened the Ube – Ube-Shinkawa section in 1914, extending the line to Tokonami in 1923 and Ogori (now Shin-Yamaguchi) in 1925. The line was electrified at 1500 VDC in 1929.

In 1928 the Ube Electric Railway Co. opened a 1 km line from Ube-Shinkawa to Ubeko, with a 2 km branch to the Okinoyama coal mine, both electrified at 1500 VDC.

Both companies merged in 1941, becoming the Ube Railway Co. which was nationalised in 1943.

Passenger services to Ubeko ceased in 1952, and both branches closed in 1961.

CTC signalling was commissioned in 1983, and freight services ceased in 1999.

"One-man" driver only operation commenced on the section between Ube-Shinkawa and Inō on 1 June 1990, using 105 and 123 series EMUs. The entire line was switched to driver only (conductorless) operation on 14 March 1992.

=== Former connecting lines ===
- Ube station – The Funaki Railway Co. opened a 6 km 762mm gauge line in 1916. The line was converted to 1067mm gauge in 1922, and extended 12 km to Kibe in 1926. The last 8 km closed in 1944, and the balance of the line in 1961.

== See also ==
- List of railway lines in Japan
