= Asa District, Yamaguchi =

Former district in Yamaguchi prefecture, Japan

Asa (厚狭郡, Asa-gun) was a district located in Yamaguchi Prefecture. It was dissolved in 2005. The former Asa County area included most of Ube City and all of Onoda City. The country was on the banks of Asa river and Ariho river.

== See also ==
- List of dissolved districts of Japan
