= Japan National Route 190 =

National highway in Japan

National Route 190
- 国道190号
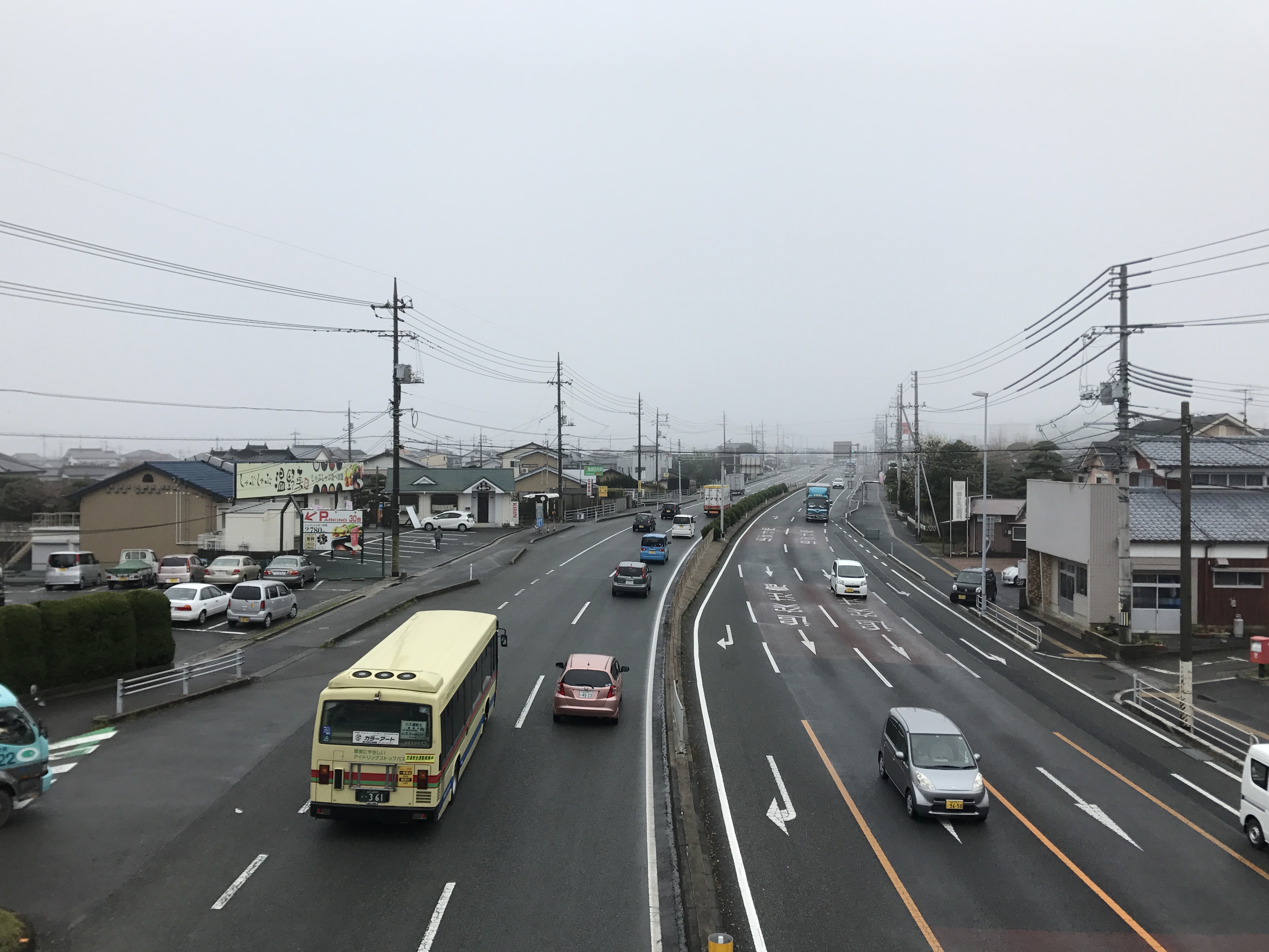

Route information
- Length: 43.7 km (27.2 mi)
- Existed: 18 May 1953–present

Major junctions
- West end: National Route 2 in San'yō-Onoda
- East end: National Route 2 in Yamaguchi

Location
- Country: Japan

Highway system
- National highways of Japan; Expressways of Japan
← National Route 189	→ National Route 191

National Route 190 is a national highway of Japan connecting Yamaguchi and San'yō-Onoda in Japan, with a total length of 43.7 km (27.2 mi).
