= Ube-Shinkawa Station =

Railway station in Ube, Yamaguchi Prefecture, Japan

Ube-Shinkawa Station 宇部新川駅
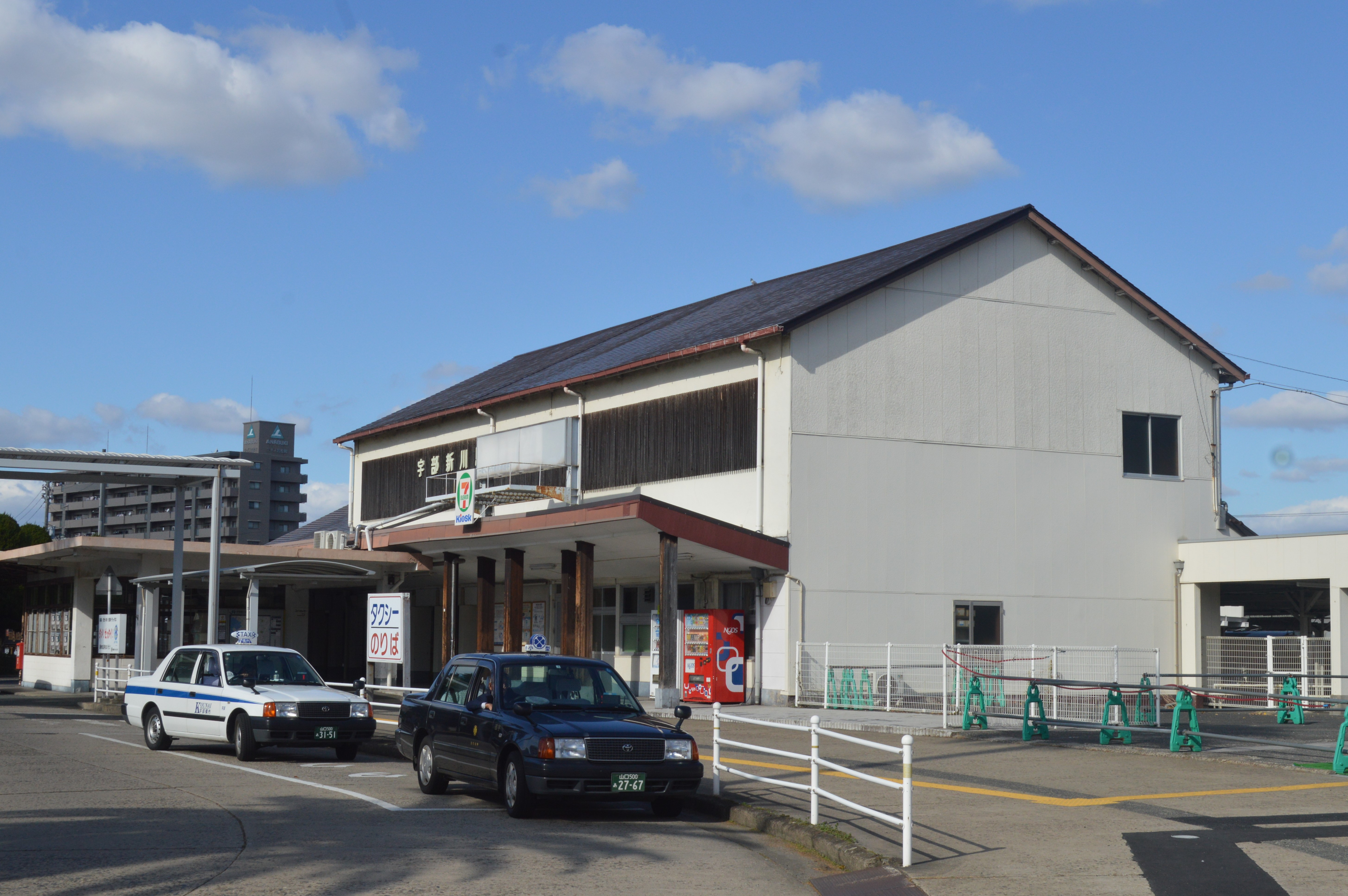
- Ube-Shinkawa Station in 2023

General information
- Location: 1-7-7 Uemachi, Higashikiwa, Ube-shi, Yamaguchi-ken 755-0061; Japan
- Coordinates: 33°57′31″N 131°14′32″E
- Owner: West Japan Railway Company
- Operator: West Japan Railway Company
- Line: Ube Line Onoda Line
- Distance: 27.1 km (16.8 miles) from Shin-Yamaguchi
- Platforms: 1 side + 1 island platform
- Tracks: 2
- Connections: Bus stop

Other information
- Status: Unstaffed
- Website: Official website

History
- Opened: 9 January 1914

Passengers
- FY2020: 601

Services
| Preceding station | JR West | Following station |
|---|---|---|
| Terminus | Onoda Line | Inō towards Onoda or Nagato-Motoyama |
| Kotoshiba towards Shin-Yamaguchi | Ube Line Local | Inō towards Ube |
| Kotoshiba towards Shin-Yamaguchi | Ube Line Rapid | Inō towards Ube |
Location
- Location within Yamaguchi Prefecture Location within Japan

Ube-Shinkawa Station (宇部新川駅, Ube-shinkawa-eki) is a passenger railway station located in the city of Ube, Yamaguchi Prefecture, Japan. It is operated by the West Japan Railway Company (JR West).

== Lines ==
Ube-Shinkawa Station is served by the JR West Ube Line, and is located 27.1 kilometers from the terminus of the line at Shin-Yamaguchi. Most trains of the Onoda Line continue past the nominal terminus of that line at Inō Station to terminate at Ube-Shinkawa.

== Station layout ==
The station consists of one side platform and one island platform connected to the station building by a footbridge. The station is staffed.

=== Platforms ===
| 1 | ■ Ube Line | for Inō and Ube |
| 1 | ■ Onoda Line | for Inō, Suzumeda and Onoda |
| 3, 4 | ■ Ube Line | for Shin-Yamaguchi for Inō and Ube |
| 3, 4 | ■ Onoda Line | for Inō, Suzumeda and Onoda |

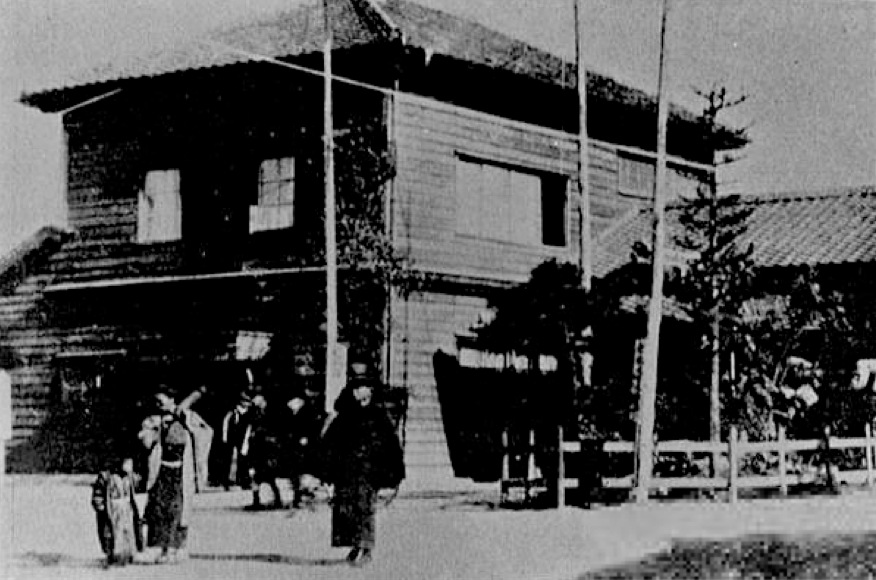
The original Ubeshinkawa Station in 1914

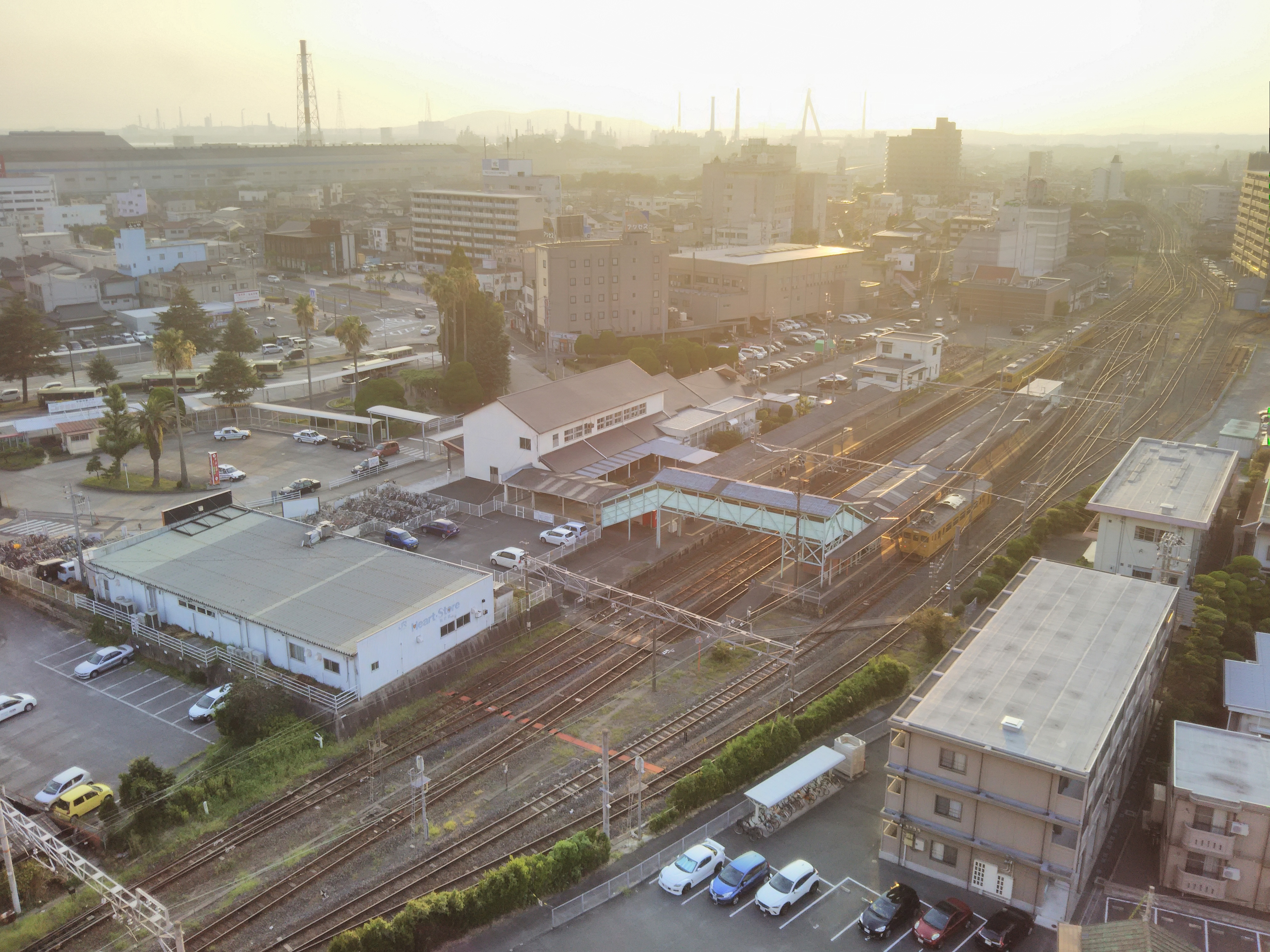
The station viewed from above in August 2016

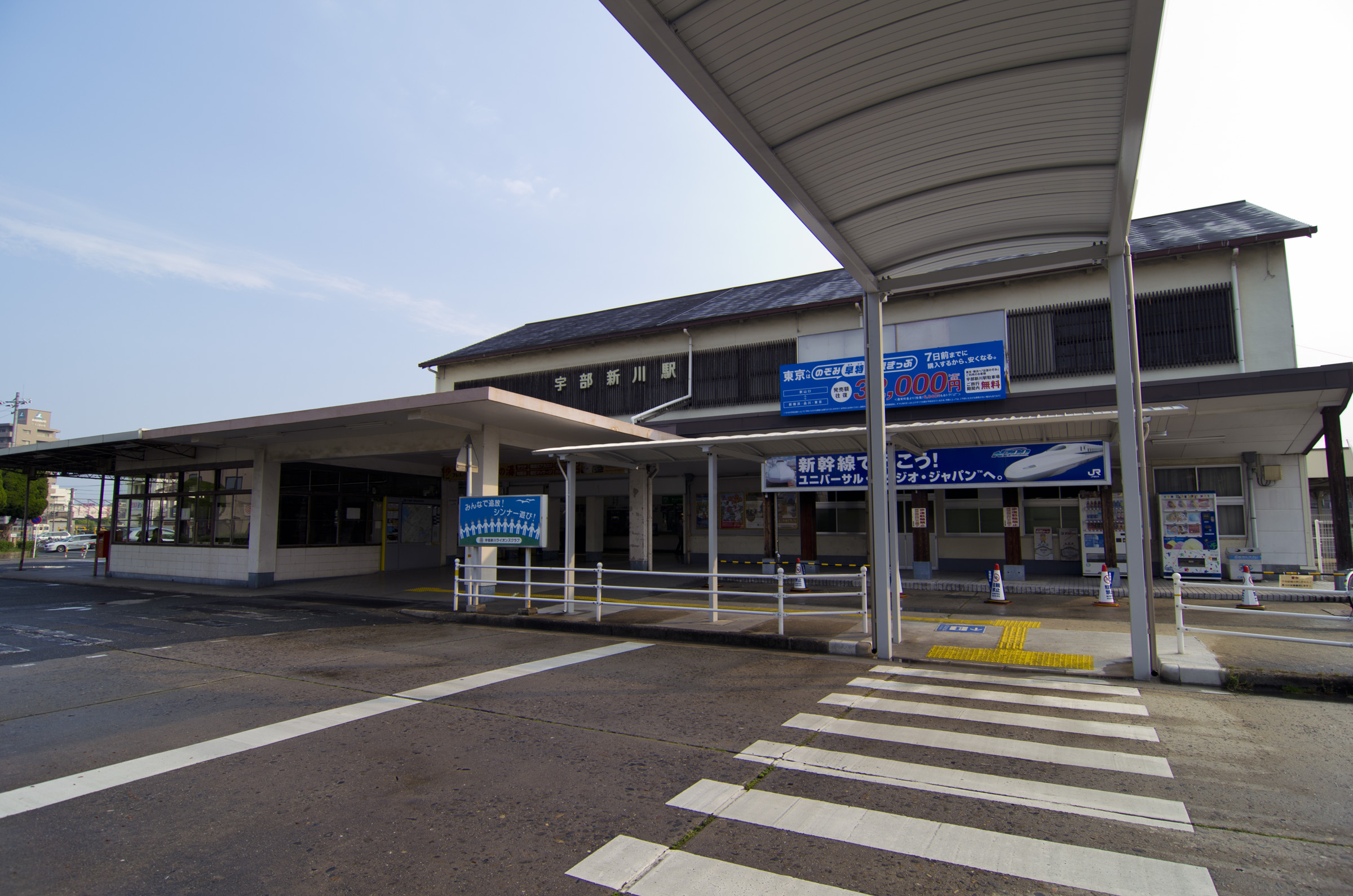
Ubeshinkawa Station building in May 2012

== History ==
Ube-Shinkawa Station was opened on 9 January 1914 with the opening of the Ube Railway. The line was nationalized in 1943, becoming the Ube Higashi Line, and the station was renamed Ube Station (宇部駅, Ube-eki) at that time. The line was renamed Ube Line on 1 February 1948. The station reverted to its original name on 15 September 1964. With the privatization of the Japan National Railway (JNR) on 1 April 1987, the station came under the aegis of the West Japan railway Company (JR West). The station is depicted in the 2021 anime film Evangelion: 3.0+1.0 Thrice Upon a Time, directed by Ube native Hideaki Anno.

== Passenger statistics ==
In fiscal 2020, the station was used by an average of 601 passengers daily.

== Surrounding area ==
The area from this station to Kotoshiba Station is the central urban area of Ube city.

- Ube City Cultural Center
- Ube City Local Museum
- Yamaguchi University Hospital, Yamaguchi University Kogushi Campus
- Ube Municipal Shinkawa Elementary School

== See also ==
- List of railway stations in Japan
