= Shin-Yamaguchi Station =

Railway station in Yamaguchi, Yamaguchi Prefecture, Japan

Shin-Yamaguchi Station 新山口駅
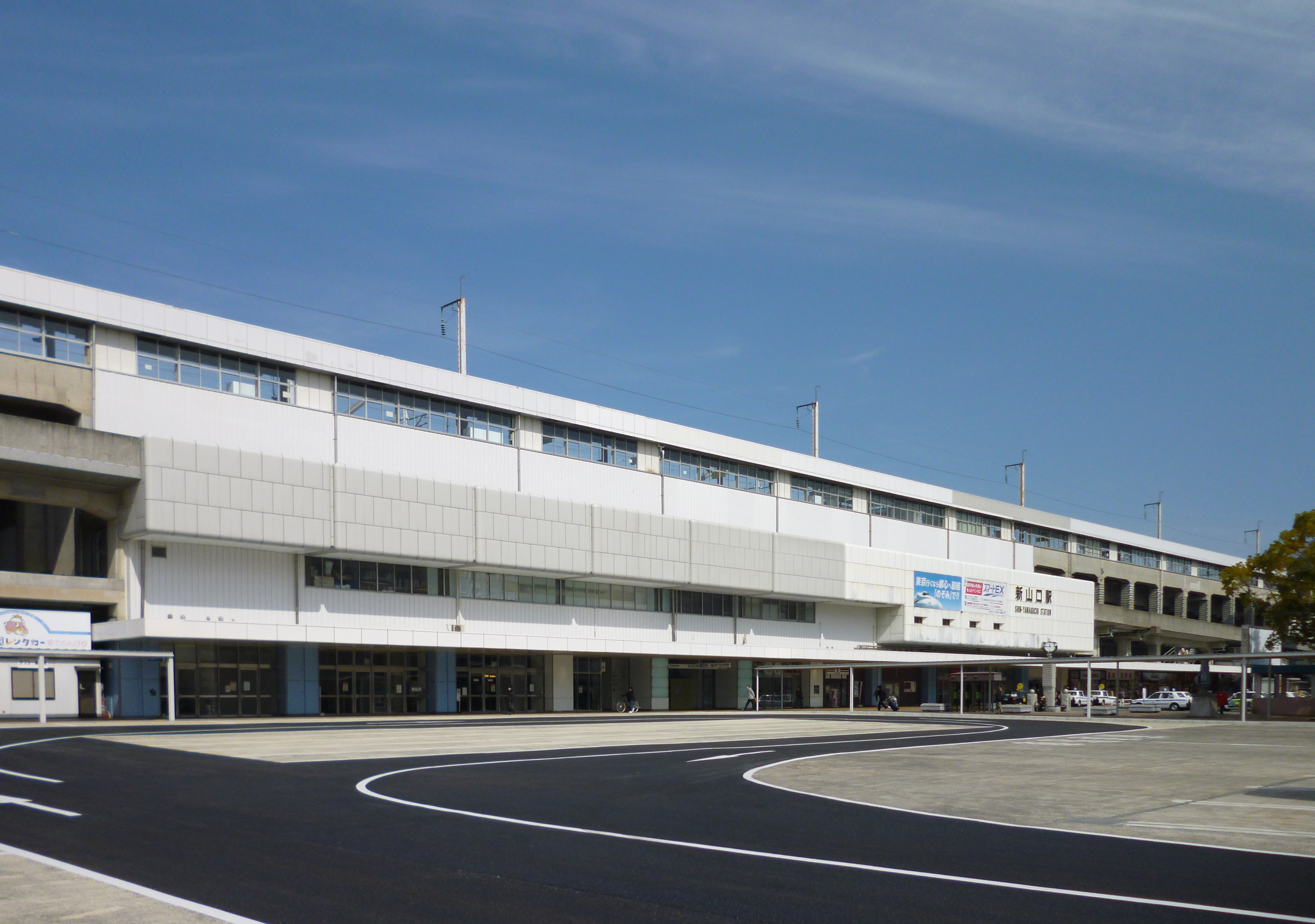
- Shin-Yamaguchi Station in February 2019

General information
- Location: 1294, Ogōri-Shimogō, Yamaguchi-shi, Yamaguchi-ken 754-0041
- Coordinates: 34°05′35″N 131°23′50″E
- Operator: JR West
- Lines: San'yō Shinkansen; San'yō Line; Ube Line; Yamaguchi Line
- Platforms: 2 side platforms (Shinkansen); 3 island platforms and 2 side platforms (conventional line)
- Tracks: 4 Shinkansen, 8 conventional lines
- Connections: Bus terminal

Construction
- Structure type: Elevated

Other information
- Status: Staffed (Midori no Madoguchi)
- Website: Official website

History
- Opened: 3 December 1900
- Former names: Ogōri (until 2003)

Passengers
- FY2022: 6452

Services
Preceding station	JR West	Following station
Kokura towards Hakata	San'yō Shinkansen Mizuho	Hiroshima towards Shin-Ōsaka
Kokura towards Hakata	San'yō Shinkansen Nozomi	Tokuyama towards Shin-Ōsaka
Shin-Shimonoseki towards Hakata	San'yō Shinkansen Sakura	Tokuyama towards Shin-Ōsaka
Shin-Shimonoseki towards Hakata	San'yō Shinkansen Hikari	Tokuyama towards Shin-Ōsaka
Asa towards Hakata or Hakataminami	San'yō Shinkansen Kodama	Tokuyama towards Shin-Ōsaka
Location

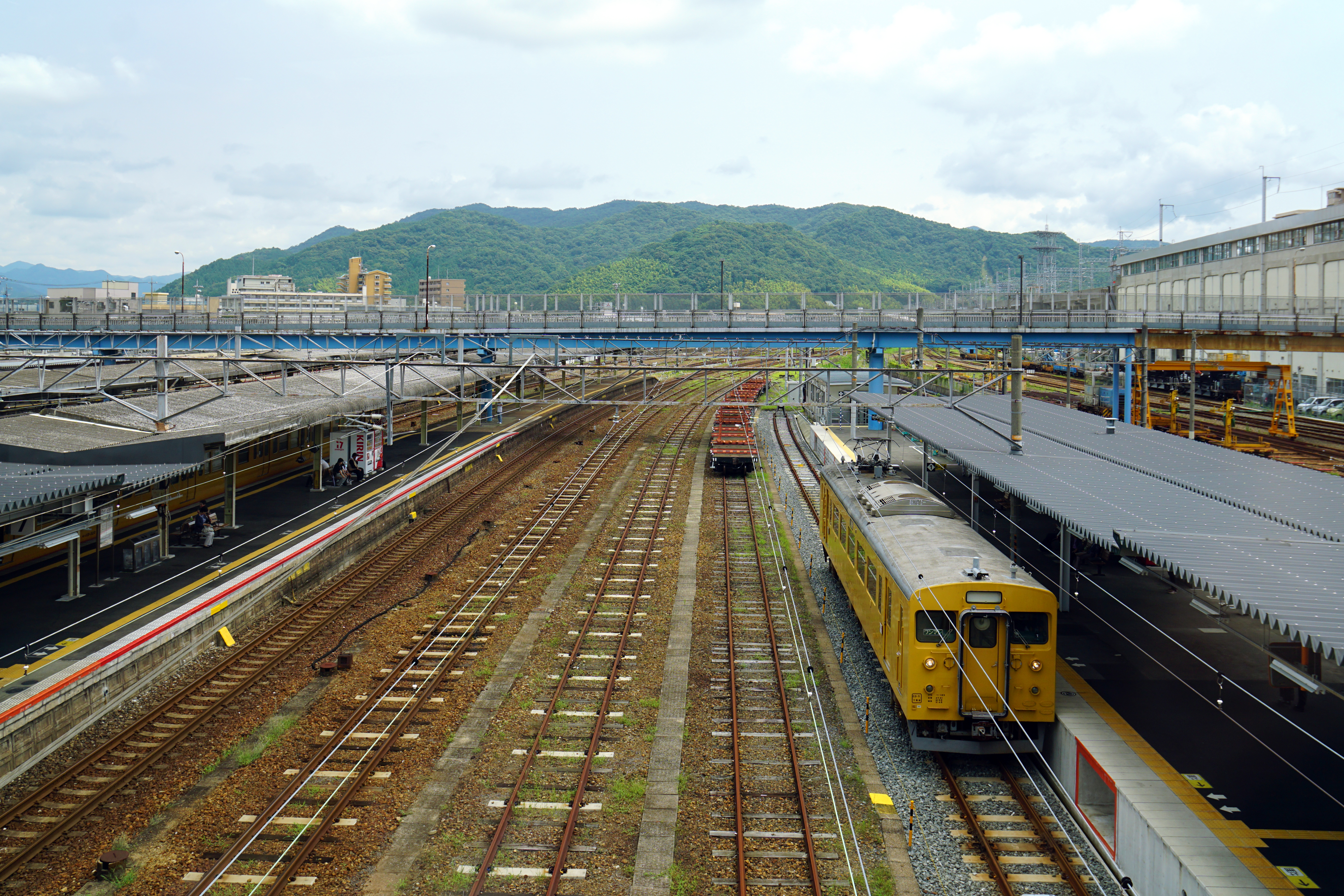
Platform

Shin-Yamaguchi Station (Japanese: 新山口駅, Hepburn: Shin-Yamaguchi-eki; lit. 'New Yamaguchi Station') is a passenger railway station located in the city of Yamaguchi, Yamaguchi Prefecture, Japan. It is operated by the West Japan Railway Company (JR West).

== Lines ==
Shin-Yamaguchi Station is served by the Sanyō Shinkansen and is 474.4 kilometers from Shin-Osaka and 1027.0 kilometers from Tokyo. It is also served by the JR West San'yō Main Line, and is located 459.2 kilometers from the terminus of that line at Kobe. The station is also the southern terminus for the 93.9 kilometer Yamaguchi Line to Masuda and the eastern terminus of the 33.2 kilometer Ube Line to Ube. It is also the starting station of the rapid sightseeing train SL Yamaguchi steam train on the Yamaguchi Line.

== Layout ==
The station has two opposed side platforms sandwiching three island platforms for regular train services. The platforms are connected by an elevated station building. The Shinkansen portion of the station has two elevated side platforms on the third floor of the station building. The station has a Midori no Madoguchi staffed ticket office.

=== Platforms ===
0	■ Yamaguchi Line	for Yamaguchi, Tsuwano, Masuda
1	■ Yamaguchi Line	for Yamaguchi, Tsuwano, Masuda (including "Super Oki" and "SL Yamaguchi")
2	■ Yamaguchi Line	for Yamaguchi, Tsuwano, Masuda
3	■ no entrance	
4	■ Sanyō Main Line	for Tokuyama, Yanai, Iwakuni
5	■ Sanyō Main Line	returning for Tokuyama, Yanai, Iwakuni returning for Ube, Asa, Shimonoseki
6	■ Sanyō Main Line	for Ube, Asa, Shimonoseki returning for Tokuyama, Yanai, Iwakuni
7	■ Sanyō Main Line	for Ube, Asa, Shimonoseki (part of trains)
8	■ Ube Line	for Ubemisaki, Ube-Shinkawa
11	■ Sanyō Shinkansen	for Hiroshima, Shin-Ōsaka, Tokyo
12	■ Sanyō Shinkansen	for Kokura, Hakata, Kumamoto, Kagoshima-Chūō

== Adjacent stations ==
«	Service	»
Sanyō Main Line
Shin-Shimonoseki (Shimonoseki bound trains); Ube (Osaka bound trains)	West Express Ginga	Tokuyama (Shimonoseki bound trains); Hofu (Osaka bound trains)
Yotsutsuji	Local	Kagawa
Yamaguchi Line
Terminus	Limited Express Super Oki	Yudaonsen
Terminus	Rapid Commuter Liner	Ōtoshi
Terminus	Local	Suō-Shimogō
Ube Line
Terminus	Local	Kami-Kagawa

Some Nozomi, Mizuho, Hikari, and Sakura Shinkansen services pass through this station without stopping.

== History ==
Shin-Yamaguchi Station was opened on 3 December 1900 as Ogōri Station (小郡駅) on the San'yō Railway when the line was extended from Mitajiri (present-day Hōfu Station) to Asa Station. The San'yō Railway was railway nationalized in 1906 and the line renamed the San'yō Main Line in 1909. The Yamaguchi Line began operations from 20 February 1913 and the Ube Railway (later Ube Line) on 26 March 1925. The Sanyō Shinkansen station opened on 10 March 1975. With the privatization of the Japan National Railway (JNR) on 1 April 1987, the station came under the aegis of the West Japan Railway Company (JR West). On 1 October 2003, the station was renamed Shin-Yamaguchi Station.

== Passenger statistics ==
In fiscal 2022, the station was used by an average of 6452 passengers daily.

== Surrounding area ==
- Yamaguchi City Ogori Cultural Museum
- Yamaguchi City Ogori General Branch (Former Ogori Town Hall)
- Yamaguchi Municipal Ogori Junior High School

== See also ==
- List of railway stations in Japan
