= Ube Station =

Railway station in Ube, Yamaguchi Prefecture, Japan

Ube Station 宇部駅
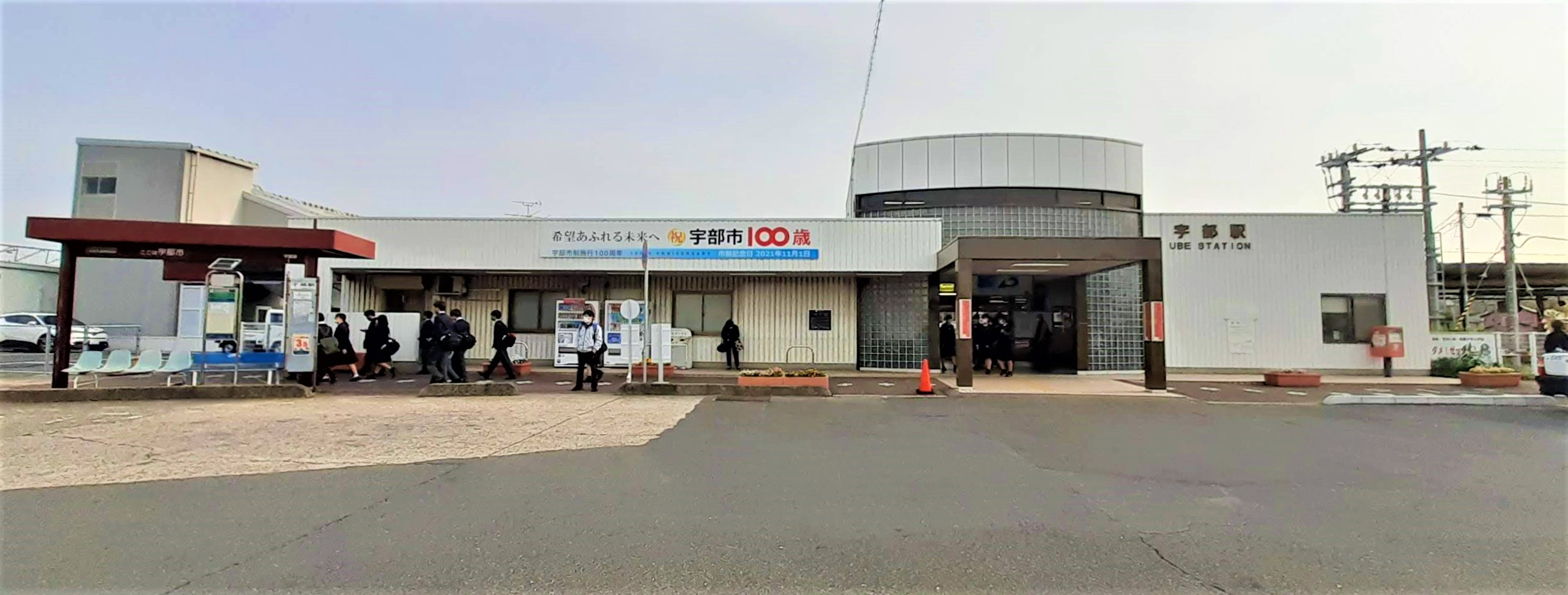
- Ube Station in April 2021

General information
- Location: 4-4-18 Nishiubeminami, Ube-shi, Yamaguchi-ken 759-0208; Japan
- Coordinates: 34°0′10.89″N 131°13′18.24″E
- Owner: West Japan Railway Company
- Operator: West Japan Railway Company Japan Freight Railway Company
- Line: San'yō Line Ube Line
- Distance: 484.5 km (301.1 miles) from Kobe
- Platforms: 1 side + 2 island platforms
- Tracks: 6
- Connections: Bus stop

Other information
- Status: Staffed
- Website: Official website

History
- Opened: 1 July 1910; 116 years ago
- Former names: Nishi-Ube Station (1943 to 1964)

Passengers
- FY2022: 1521 (daily)

Services
Preceding station	JR West	Following station
Onoda towards Shimonoseki	San'yō Line Local	Kotō towards Osaka
Iwahana towards Shin-Yamaguchi	Ube Line	Terminus
Shin-Shimonoseki One-way operation	San'yō Line West Express Ginga	Shin-Yamaguchi towards Iwakuni
Location
- Location within Yamaguchi Prefecture Location within Japan

Ube Station (宇部駅, Ube-eki) is a junction passenger railway station located in the city of Ube, Yamaguchi Prefecture, Japan. It is operated by the West Japan Railway Company (JR West). It is also the location of a freight depot operated by the Japan Freight Railway Company (JR Freight).

== Lines ==
Ube Station is served by the JR West San'yō Main Line, and is located 484.5 kilometers from the terminus of the line at Kobe. It is also the western terminus of the 33.2 kilometer Ube Line from Shin-Yamaguchi.

== Station layout ==
The station consists of one side platform and two island platform connected by a footbridge. The side platform has a cutout, allowing it to serve two tracks. The station is staffed.

== Platforms ==
0, 1	■ Ube Line	for Ube-Shinkawa
3	■ San'yō Line	spare
4	■ San'yō Line	for Asa and Shimonoseki
5,6	■ San'yō Line	for Shin-Yamaguchi and Tokuyama

== History ==
Ube Station was opened on 1 July 1910. The station name was changed to Nishi-Ube Station (西宇部駅) from 1 May 1943 to 1 October 1964. With the privatization of the Japan National Railway (JNR) on 1 April 1987, the station came under the aegis of the West Japan railway Company (JR West).

== Passenger statistics ==
In fiscal 2022, the station was used by an average of 1521 passengers daily.

== Surrounding area ==
Until the 1960s, the area around the station was lined with entertainment facilities such as racetracks and movie theaters, but with the closure of the coal mines, it declined, and the surrounding area became a quiet area with mainly residential areas and commercial facilities nearby. Many roads around the station are narrow in relation to the traffic volume, and congestion frequently occurs due to the congestion of through traffic and daily traffic.

- Ube City Konan Civic Center
- Ube Kojo High School
- Yamaguchi Prefectural Ube Nishi High School
- Yamaguchi Prefectural Ube Commercial High School
- Ube Municipal Nishiube Elementary School

== See also ==
- List of railway stations in Japan
