= Tsumazaki Station =

Railway station in Honshu, Japan

Tsumazaki Station 妻崎駅
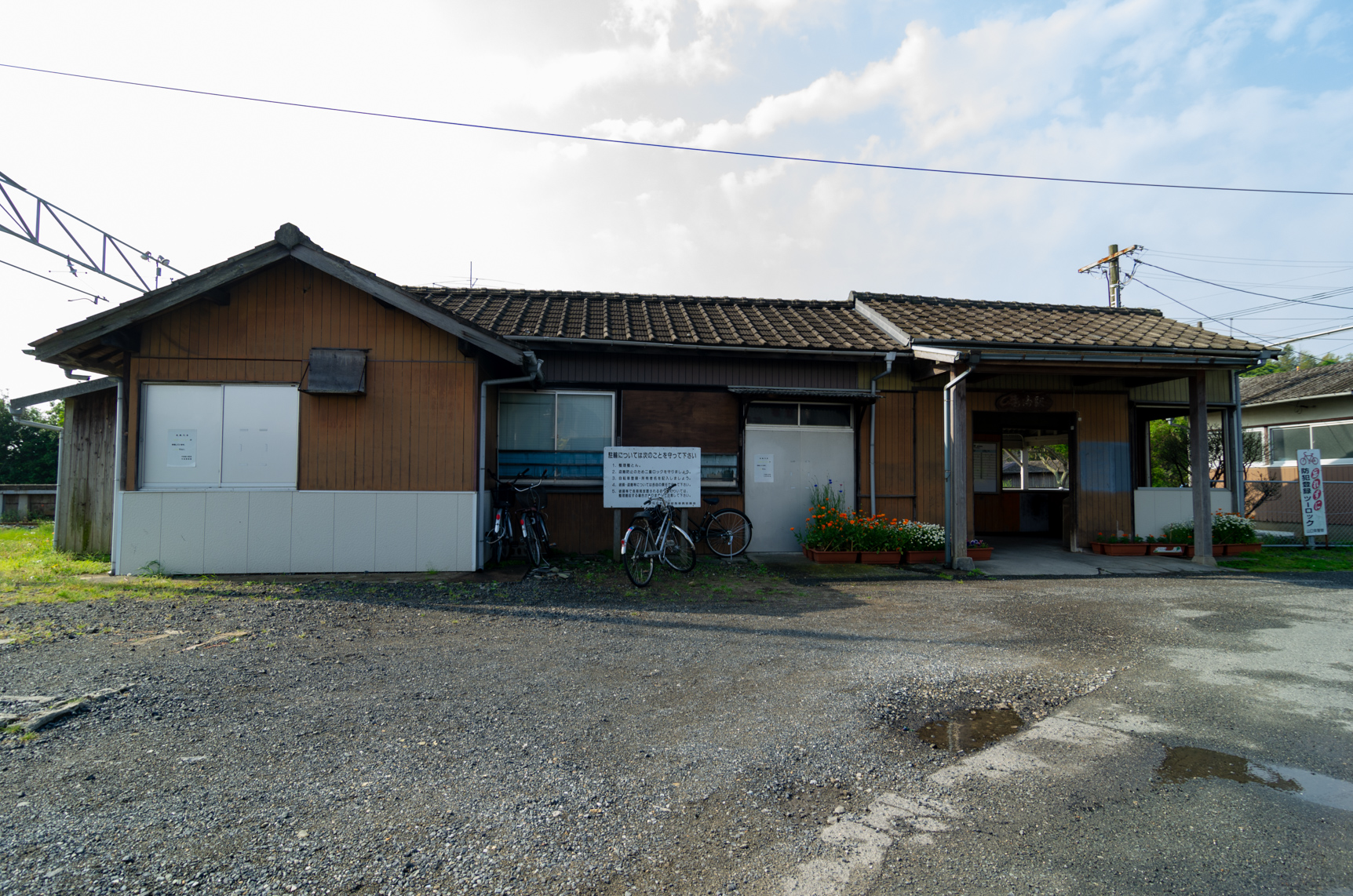
- Tsumazaki Station in May 2012

General information
- Location: Higashisue, Ube-shi, Yamaguchi-ken 759-0206; Japan
- Coordinates: 33°58′13.75″N 131°12′9.31″E
- Owner: West Japan Railway Company
- Operator: West Japan Railway Company
- Line: Onoda Line
- Distance: 11.5 km (7.1 miles) from Ube-Shinkawa
- Platforms: 1 island platform
- Tracks: 2
- Connections: Bus stop

Other information
- Status: Unstaffed
- Website: Official website

History
- Opened: 16 May 1929

Passengers
- FY2020: 16

Services
Preceding station	JR West	Following station
Inō towards Ube-Shinkawa	Onoda Line	Nagato-Nagasawa towards Onoda or Nagato-Motoyama
Location
- Location within Yamaguchi Prefecture Location within Japan

Tsumazaki Station (妻崎駅, Tsumazaki-eki) is a passenger railway station located in the city of Ube, Yamaguchi Prefecture, Japan. It is operated by the West Japan Railway Company (JR West).

== Lines ==
Tsumazaki Station is served by the JR West Onoda Line, and is located 2.5 kilometers from the junction of the San'yō Main Line at Inō and 4.3 kilometers from terminus of the line at Ube-Shinkawa.

== Station layout ==
The station consists of one ground level unnumbered island platform. The station building is located north of the platforms and is connected via a level crossing. The station is unattended.

== Platforms ==
1	■ Onoda Line	for Ube-Shinkawa
2	■ Onoda Line	for Onodakō and Onoda

== History ==
Tsumazaki Station was opened on 16 May 1929 on the Onoda Railway. The Onoda Railway was railway nationalized in 1943. With the privatization of the Japan National Railway (JNR) on 1 April 1987, the station came under the aegis of the West Japan railway Company (JR West).

== Passenger statistics ==
In fiscal 2020, the station was used by an average of 21 passengers daily.

== Surrounding area ==
- Japan National Route 190

== See also ==
- List of railway stations in Japan
