= Minami-Nakagawa Station =

Railway station in San'yō-Onoda, Yamaguchi Prefecture, Japan

Minami-Nakagawa Station 南中川駅
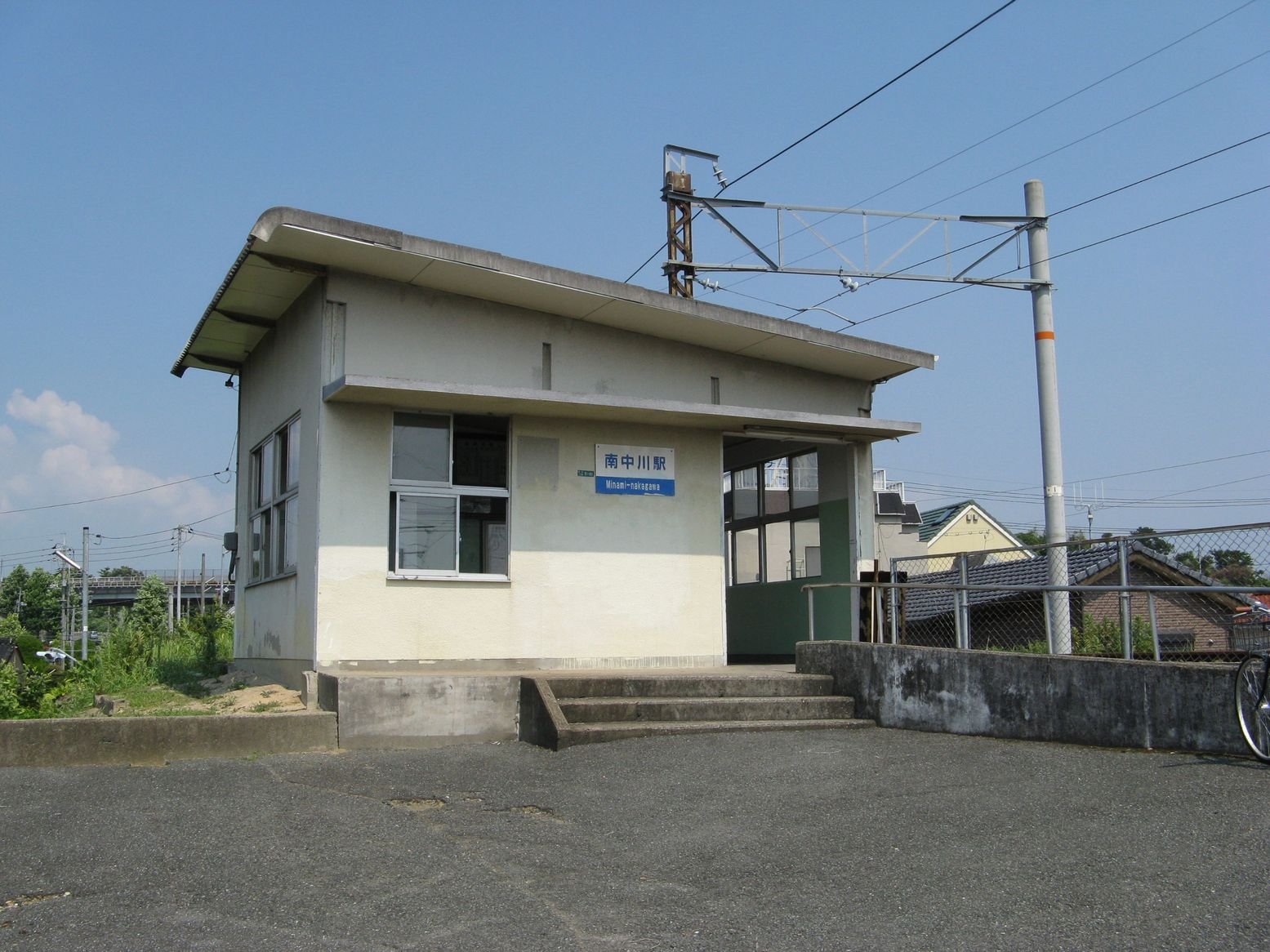
- Minami-Nakagawa Station in August 2008

General information
- Location: 2-5-48 Nakagawa, San'yō-Onoda-shi, Yamaguchi-ken 756-0088; Japan
- Coordinates: 33°59′13″N 131°10′41.77″E
- Owner: West Japan Railway Company
- Operator: West Japan Railway Company
- Line: Onoda Line
- Distance: 10.1 km (6.3 miles) from Ube-Shinkawa
- Platforms: 1 side platform
- Tracks: 2
- Connections: Bus stop

Other information
- Status: Unstaffed
- Website: Official website

History
- Opened: 25 November 1915; 110 years ago

Passengers
- FY2020: 82

Services
Preceding station	JR West	Following station
Minami-Onoda towards Ube-Shinkawa	Onoda Line	Mede towards Onoda
Location
- Location within Yamaguchi Prefecture Location within Japan

Minami-Nakagawa Station (南中川駅, Minami-Nakagawa-eki) is a passenger railway station located in the city of San'yō-Onoda, Yamaguchi Prefecture, Japan. It is operated by the West Japan Railway Company (JR West).

== Lines ==
Minami-Nakagawa Station is served by the JR West Onoda Line, and is located 8.3 kilometers from the junction of the San'yō Main Line at Inō and 10.1 kilometers from terminus of the line at Ube-Shinkawa.

== Station layout ==
The station consists of one ground-level side platform serving a single bi-directional track. The station is unattended.

== History ==
Minami-Nakagawa was opened on 25 November 1915 as a temporary stop on the Onoda Railway and was elevated to a full passenger station on 15 August 1921. The Onoda Railway was railway nationalized in 1943. With the privatization of the Japan National Railway (JNR) on 1 April 1987, the station came under the aegis of the West Japan Railway Company (JR West).

== Passenger statistics ==
In fiscal 2020, the station was used by an average of 82 passengers daily.

== Surrounding area ==
- Sanyo Onoda City Central Library
- Sanyo Onoda Civic Hall
- Sanyo Onoda Municipal Onoda Junior High School
- Sanyo Onoda Municipal Onoda Elementary Schoole

== See also ==
- List of railway stations in Japan
