= Nagato-Nagasawa Station =

Railway station in Ube, Yamaguchi Prefecture, Japan

Nagato-Nagasawa Station 長門長沢駅
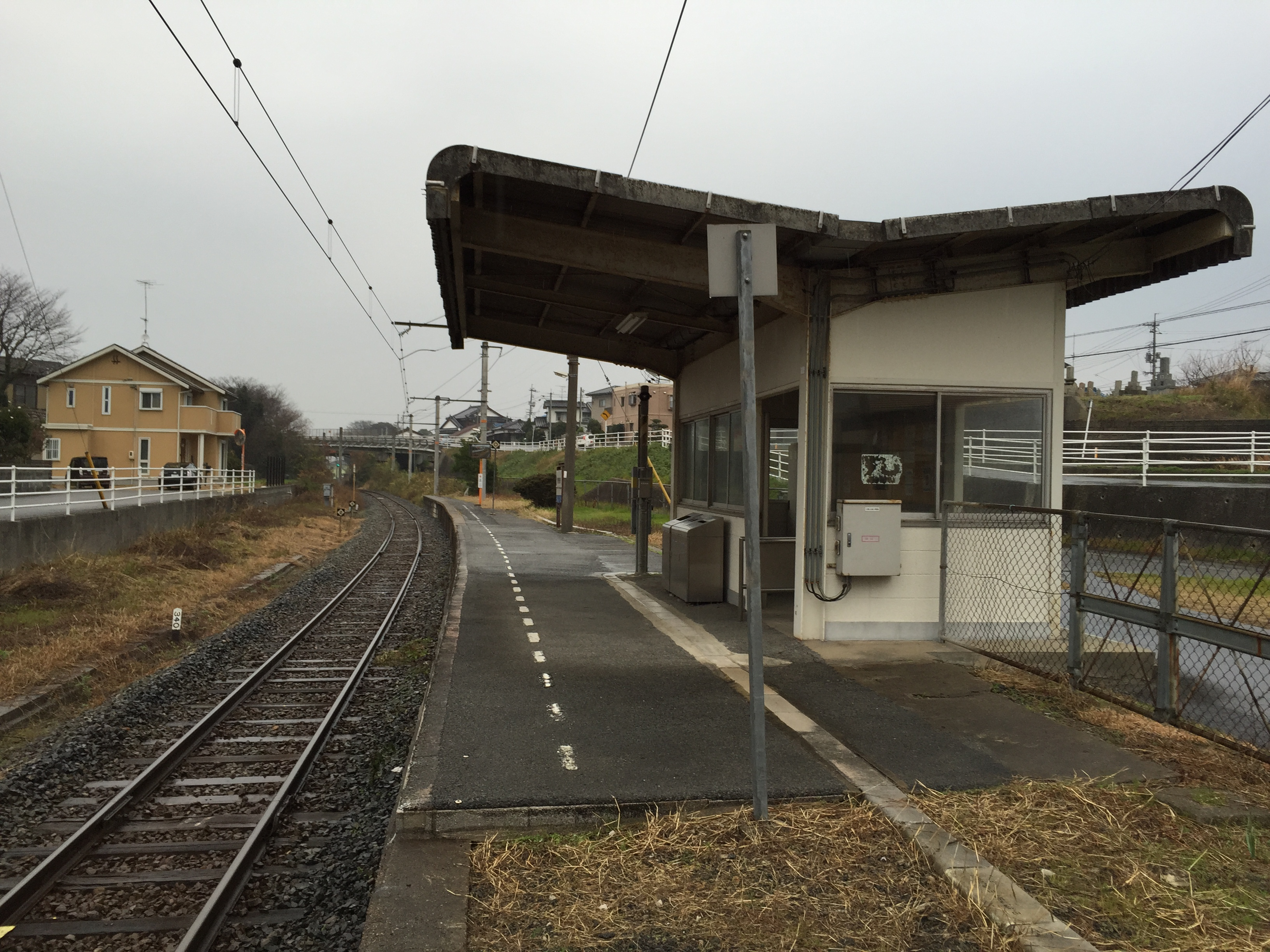
- Nagato-Nagasawa Station

General information
- Location: Higashisue, Ube-shi, Yamaguchi-ken 759-0206; Japan
- Coordinates: 33°57′59.83″N 131°11′48.61″E
- Owner: West Japan Railway Company
- Operator: West Japan Railway Company
- Line: Onoda Line
- Distance: 3.2 km (2.0 miles) from Ube-Shinkawa
- Platforms: 1 side platform
- Tracks: 1
- Connections: Bus stop

Other information
- Status: Unstaffed
- Website: Official website

History
- Opened: 25 November 1915

Passengers
- FY2020: 10

Services
Preceding station	JR West	Following station
Tsumazaki towards Ube-Shinkawa	Onoda Line	Suzumeda towards Onoda or Nagato-Motoyama
Location
- Location within Yamaguchi Prefecture Location within Japan

Nagato-Nagasawa Station (長門長沢駅, Nagato-Nagasawa-eki) is a passenger railway station located in the city of Ube, Yamaguchi Prefecture, Japan. It is operated by the West Japan Railway Company (JR West).

== Lines ==
Nagato-Nagasawa Station is served by the JR West Onoda Line, and is located 3.2 kilometers from the junction of the San'yō Main Line at Inō and 5.0 kilometers from terminus of the line at Ube-Shinkawa.

== Station layout ==
The station consists of one ground-level side platform serving a single bi-directional track. The station is unattended.

== History ==
Nagato-Nagasawa Station Station was opened on 25 November 1915 as a temporary stop on the Onoda Railway. It was elevated to a full station on 1 May 1943. The Onoda Railway was railway nationalized in 1943. With the privatization of the Japan National Railway (JNR) on 1 April 1987, the station came under the aegis of the West Japan railway Company (JR West).

== Passenger statistics ==
In fiscal 2020, the station was used by an average of 10 passengers daily.

== Surrounding area ==
- Sanyo Onoda City Yamaguchi Tokyo University of Science

== See also ==
- List of railway stations in Japan
