= Mede Station =

Railway station in San'yō-Onoda, Yamaguchi Prefecture, Japan

Mede Station 目出駅
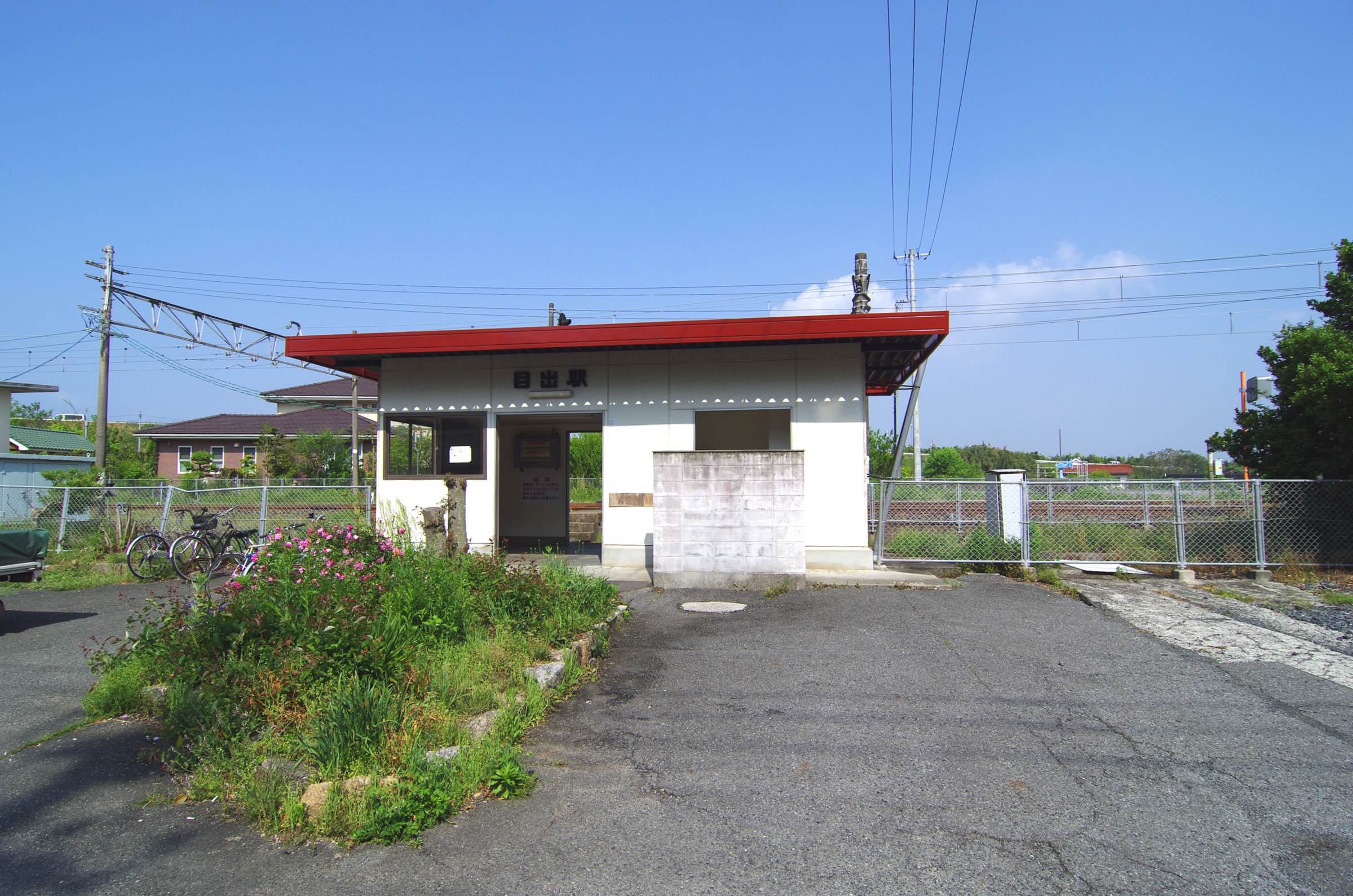
- Meda Station in May 2012

General information
- Location: 7512 Mede, San'yō-Onoda-shi, Yamaguchi-ken 756-0088; Japan
- Coordinates: 33°59′47.98″N 131°11′0.73″E
- Owner: West Japan Railway Company
- Operator: West Japan Railway Company
- Line: Onoda Line
- Distance: 11.5 km (7.1 miles) from Ube-Shinkawa
- Platforms: 1 island platform
- Tracks: 2
- Connections: Bus stop

Other information
- Status: Unstaffed
- Website: Official website

History
- Opened: 25 November 1915

Passengers
- FY2020: 9

Services
Preceding station	JR West	Following station
Minami-Nakagawa towards Ube-Shinkawa	Onoda Line	Onoda Terminus
Location
- Location within Yamaguchi Prefecture Location within Japan

Mede Station (目出駅, Mede-eki) is a passenger railway station located in the city of San'yō-Onoda, Yamaguchi Prefecture, Japan. It is operated by the West Japan Railway Company (JR West).

== Lines ==
Mede Station is served by the JR West Onoda Line, and is located 9.7 kilometers from the junction of the San'yō Main Line at Inō and 11.5 kilometers from terminus of the line at Ube-Shinkawa.

== Station layout ==
The station consists of one ground level unnumbered island platform connected to the station building by a level crossing. The station is unattended.

== Platforms ==
1	■ Onoda Line	for Onodakō and Ube-Shinkawa
2	■ Onoda Line	for Onoda

== History ==
Mede Station was opened on 25 November 1915 on the Onoda Railway. The Onoda Railway was railway nationalized in 1943. With the privatization of the Japan National Railway (JNR) on 1 April 1987, the station came under the aegis of the West Japan railway Company (JR West).

== Passenger statistics ==
In fiscal 2020, the station was used by an average of 9 passengers daily.

== Surrounding area ==
- Azakami Museum
- Matsue Hachiman Shrine
- Japan National Route 190 (Onoda Bypass)

== See also ==
- List of railway stations in Japan
