= Minami-Onoda Station =

Railway station in San'yō-Onoda, Yamaguchi Prefecture, Japan

Minami-Onoda Station 南小野田駅
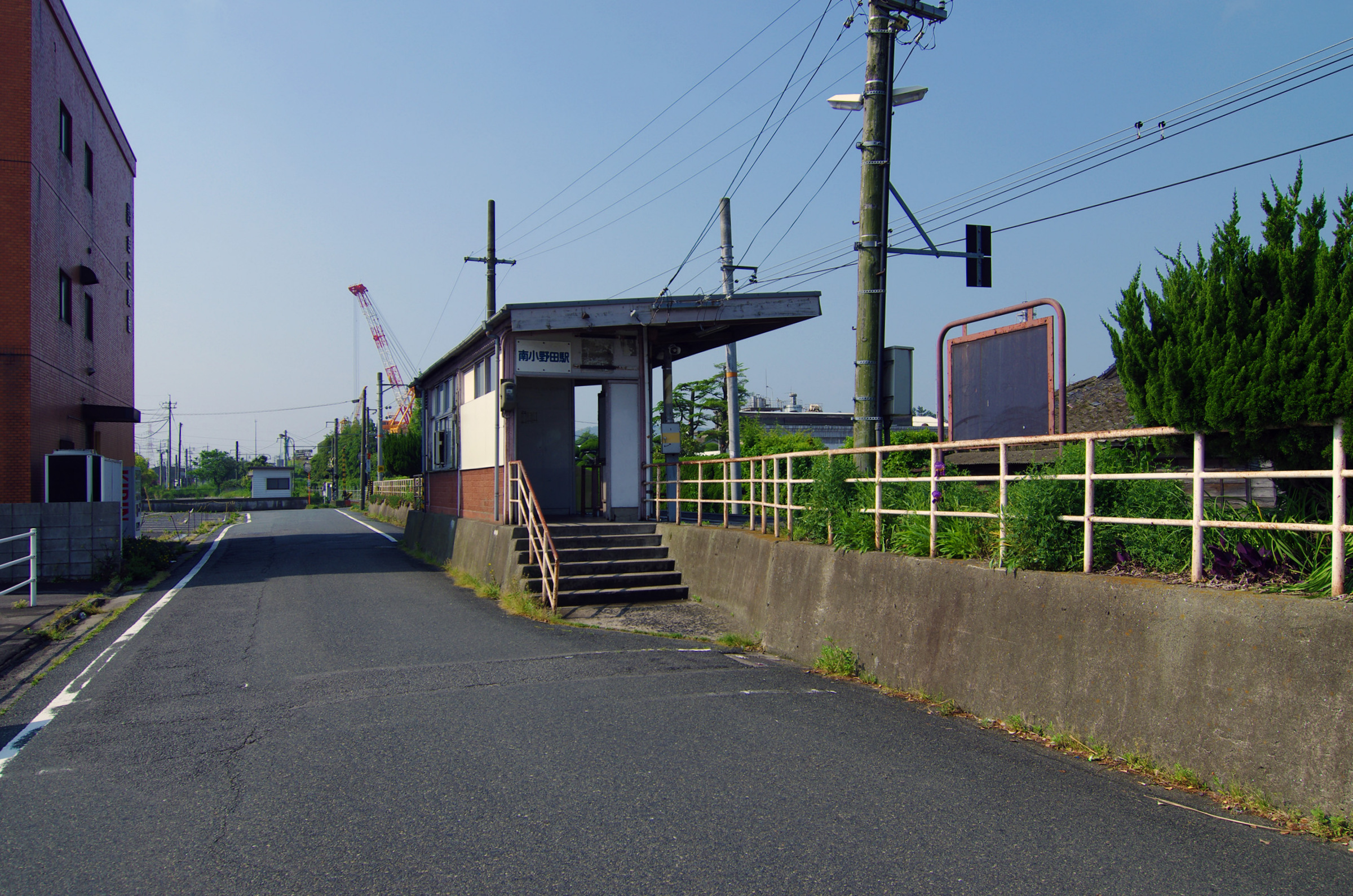
- Minami-Onoda Station in May 2012

General information
- Location: 6290-2 Heiseichō, San'yō-Onoda-shi, Yamaguchi-ken 756-0837; Japan
- Coordinates: 33°58′38.71″N 131°10′30.08″E
- Owner: West Japan Railway Company
- Operator: West Japan Railway Company
- Line: Onoda Line
- Distance: 8.9 km (5.5 miles) from Ube-Shinkawa
- Platforms: 1 side platform
- Tracks: 1
- Connections: Bus stop

Construction
- Structure type: at grade

Other information
- Status: Unstaffed
- Website: Official website

History
- Opened: 15 March 1962

Passengers
- FY2020: 96

Services
Preceding station	JR West	Following station
Onodakō towards Ube-Shinkawa	Onoda Line	Minami-Nakagawa towards Onoda
Location
- Location within Yamaguchi Prefecture Location within Japan

Minami-Onoda Station (南小野田駅, Minami-Onoda-eki) is a passenger railway station located in the city of San'yō-Onoda, Yamaguchi Prefecture, Japan. It is operated by the West Japan Railway Company (JR West).

== Lines ==
Minami-Onoda Station is served by the JR West Onoda Line, and is located 7.1 kilometers from the junction of the San'yō Main Line at Inō and 8.9 kilometers from terminus of the line at Ube-Shinkawa.

== Station layout ==
The station consists of one ground level side platform serving a single bidirectional track. The station is unattended.

== History ==
Minami-Onoda Station was opened on 25 November 1915 as Cement-chō Station (セメント町駅) on the Onoda Railway. The Onoda Railway was railway nationalized in 1943, at which time the station name was changed to Onodakō Station (小野田港駅). On 1 October 1947 the section from Onodako Station to Suzumeda Station was completed and the station renamed Onodakō Station Kitaguchi (小野田港駅北口). The station assumed its present name on 15 March 1962. With the privatization of the Japan National Railway (JNR) on 1 April 1987, the station came under the aegis of the West Japan railway Company (JR West).

== Passenger statistics ==
In fiscal 2020, the station was used by an average of 96 passengers daily.

== Surrounding area ==
The surrounding area is the urban area of Onoda. Onoda Port spreads out on the west side of the station, and there is a Taiheiyo Cement factory. There are high schools and banks on the east side of the station.

- Yamaguchi Prefectural Onoda Technical High School
- Sanyo Onoda Municipal Onoda Junior High School

== See also ==
- List of railway stations in Japan
