= 123 series =

Japanese single-car electric multiple unit train type

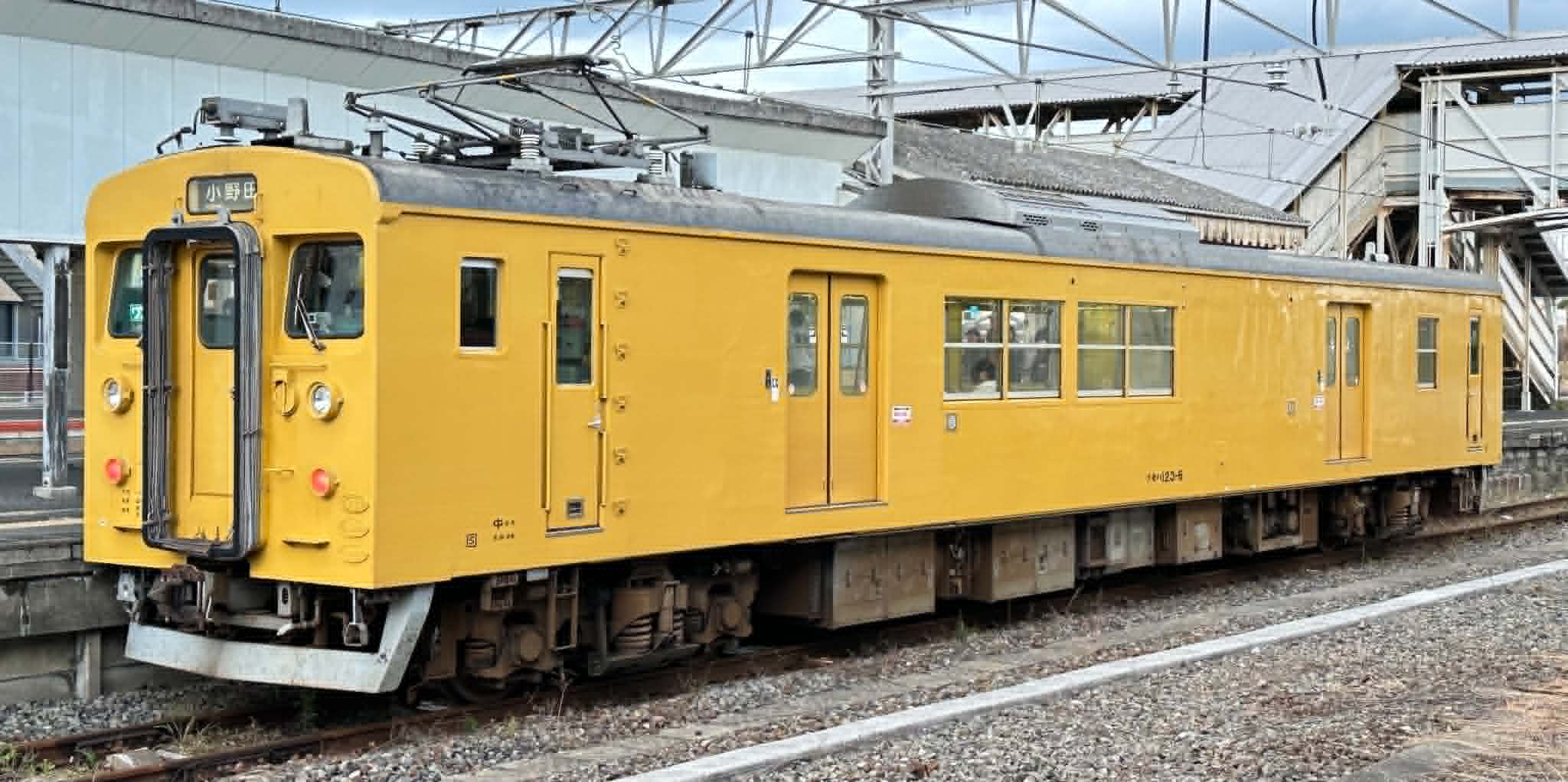
- JR West KuMoHa 123-6 in December 2025
- Stock type: Electric multiple unit
- Manufacturers: JNR (11 cars), JR Central (2 cars)
- Constructed: 1986–1988
- Entered service: 1986
- Number built: 13
- Number in service: 5
- Number scrapped: 8
- Formation: Single car
- Operators: JNR (1986–1987); JR East (1987–2013); JR Central (1987–2007); JR-West (1987–present)

Specifications
- Car body construction: Steel
- Doors: 2/3 per side
- Traction system: Resistor control
- Traction motors: MT57A、MT46A→MT55
- Electric system: 1,500 V DC
- Current collection: overhead catenary
- Safety systems: ATS-P, ATS-Ps
- Track gauge: 1,067 mm (3 ft 6 in)

The 123 series (123系, 123-kei) is a single-car electric multiple unit (EMU) train type introduced in 1986 by Japanese National Railways (JNR) through the conversion of former baggage cars for passenger service.

JNR converted eleven cars which, upon the division and privatization of JNR on 1 April 1987, were transferred to East Japan Railway Company (JR East), Central Japan Railway Company (JR Central), and West Japan Railway Company (JR West). JR Central converted a further 2 cars in March 1988.

== Overview ==
The 123 series was created by JNR in 1986 by converting eleven former baggage cars which had become surplus to requirements. These cars passed to JR East, JR Central & JR West on 1 April 1987. JR Central converted a further two cars in 1988.

Series	Converted from	Year of conversion	Number of Cars	Car Numbers	After JNR division	Withdrawn
123-0	KuMoNi 143 [JA] baggage cars	1986 (by JNR)	6	123-1	JR East	2013
123-0	KuMoNi 143 [JA] baggage cars	1986 (by JNR)	6	123-2 to 123-6	JR West	Still in service
123-40	KuMoYuNi 147 [JA] baggage cars	1986 (by JNR)	5	123-41 to 123-45	JR Central	By 2007
123-600	KuMoYa 143 [JA] baggage cars	1988 (by JR Central)	2	123-601 to 123-602	JR Central	By 2007

== Current operations ==
=== JR West ===
As of June 2026, JR West operates five 123 series cars (KuMoHa 123-2 to 123-6), primarily on the Onoda Line and on some services on the Ube Line.

=== JR Central & JR East ===
The seven JR Central cars were withdrawn by 2007, and the sole JR East car was withdrawn in 2013.

== Variants and operators ==
=== JR East ===
==== 123-0 series: KuMoHa 123-1 ====
This car was converted from former baggage car KuMoNi 143-1 at JNR Nagano Works in October 1986. It was re-liveried in March 1990 following conversion to wanman "one man" driver-only operation.

As of 1 April 2012, KuMoHa 123-1 was based at Matsumoto Depot for services between Tatsuno and Shiojiri on the Chuo Main Line Okaya-Shiojiri branch. This car was withdrawn from the start of the revised timetable on 15 March 2013, with operations replaced by E127 series two-car EMUs. It was transferred to Nagano General Rolling Stock Center then scrapped on 15 April 2013.

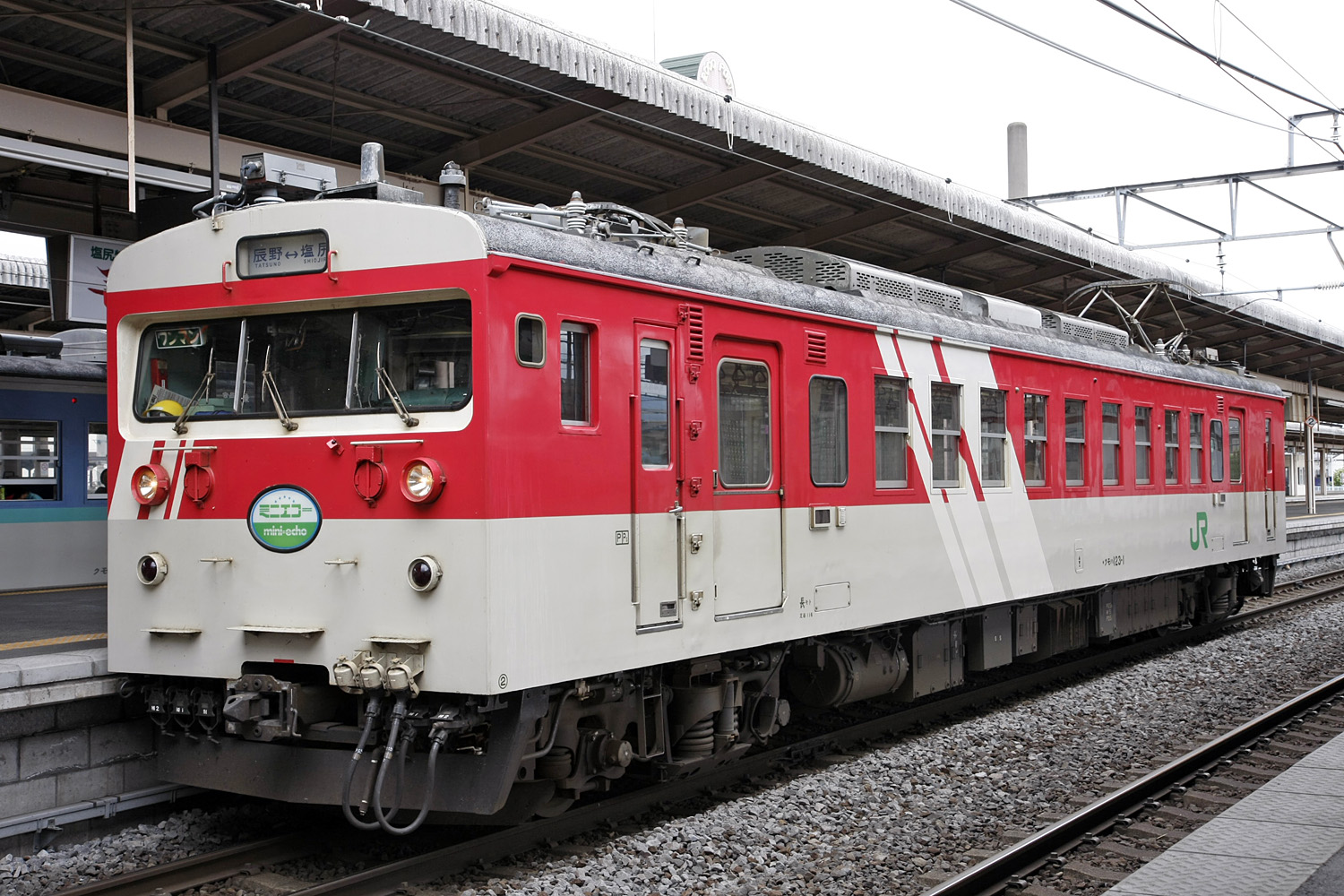
123-1 (nicknamed "Mini Echo") in May 2008

=== JR West ===
==== 123-0 series: KuMoHa 123-2 to 123-6 ====
JR West inherited five cars from JNR in 1987: KuMoHa 123-2 to 123-6. By 2003, all five cars were operating solely on the Onoda Line and the Ube Line, where they remain in service. All services have been wanman "one man" driver-only since 1 June 1990 on the Onoda Line and since 14 March 1992 on the Ube Line. Between 2010 and 2015 all cars were repainted into "Setouchi yellow" livery.

123 series cars also previously operated coupled to a two-car 105 series train on through services between the Ube Line and the San'yō Main Line between Ube and Shimonoseki.

===== KuMoHa 123-2 to 123-4 =====
These three cars were converted in February 1987 at JNR Hiroshima Works from former baggage cars KuMoNi 143-2, 143-3 and 143-6 respectively, initially for use on the Kabe Line. The two original pantographs were replaced with one PS16J lozenge-type pantograph at the No. 1 end. In 1991 they were transferred to Shimonoseki Depot for use on the Onoda Line and the Ube Line.

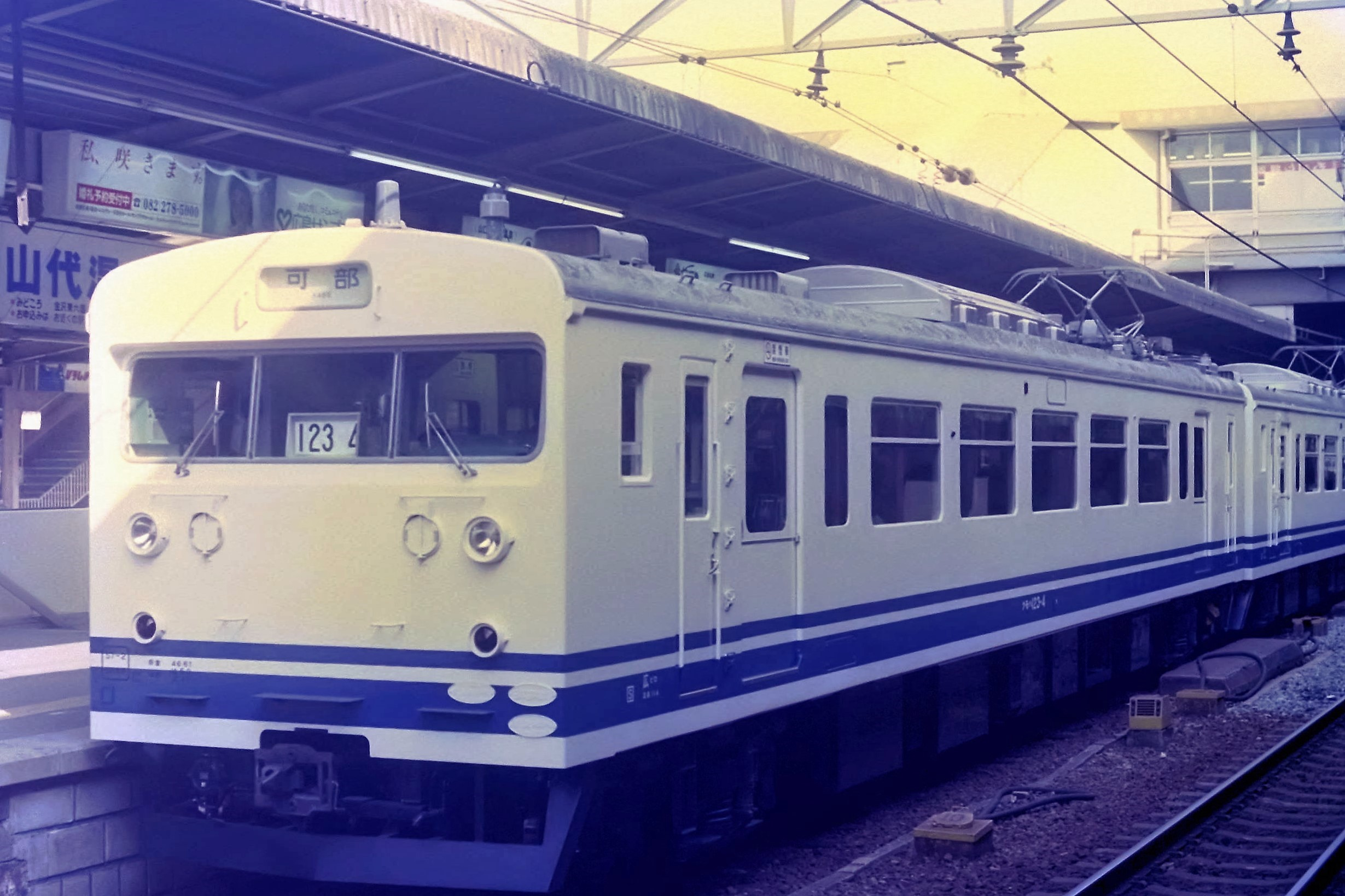
KuMoHa 123-4 in March 1987 before the addition of an end gangway

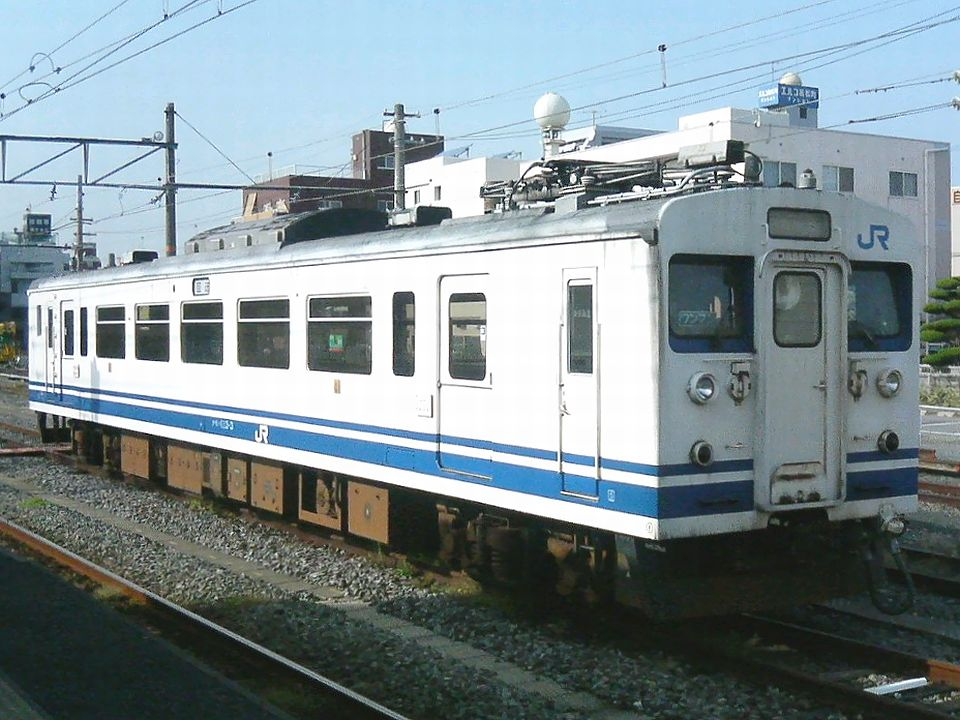
JR West KuMoHa 123-3 in October 2006

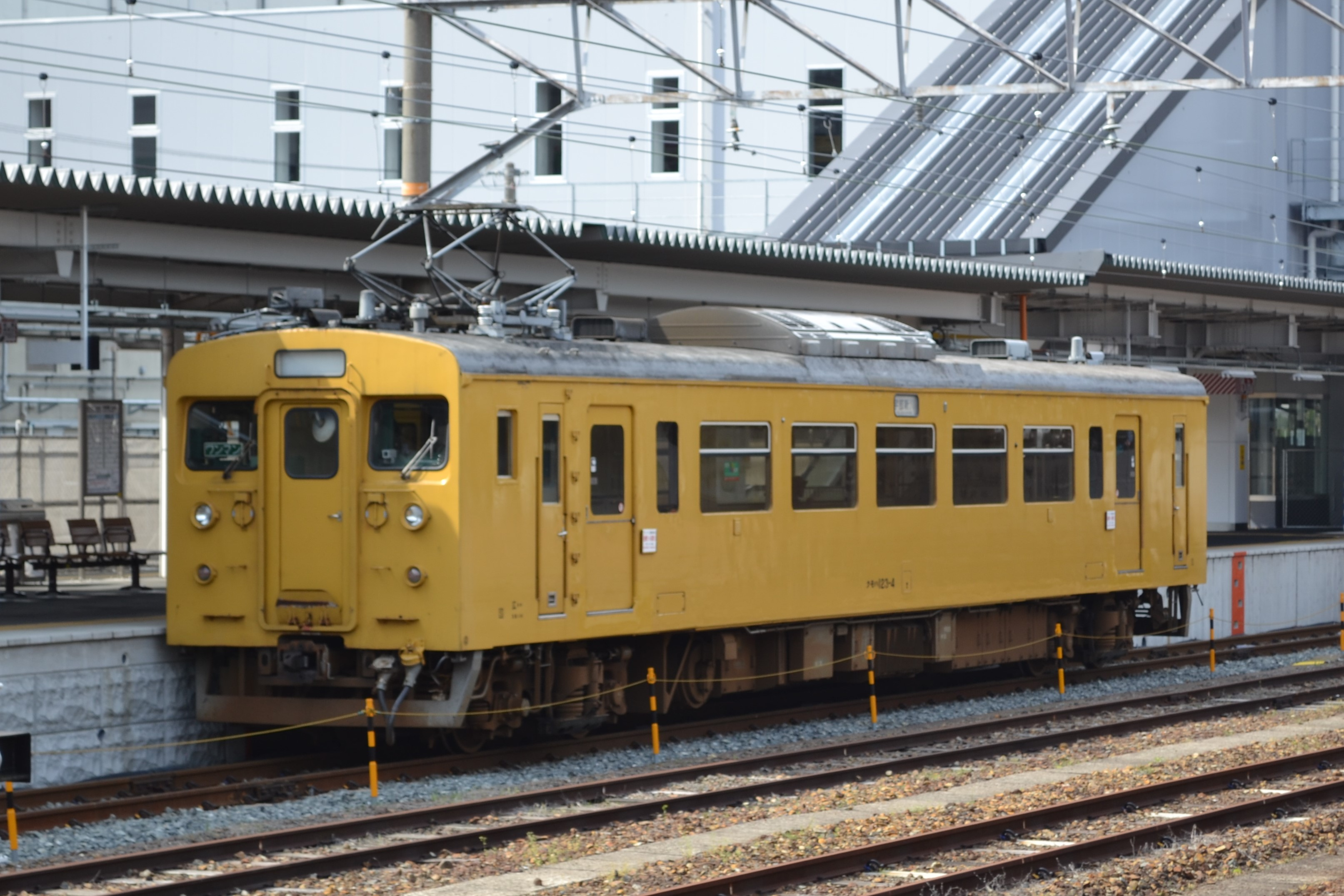
JR West KuMoHa 123-4 in "Setouchi yellow" livery in March 2014

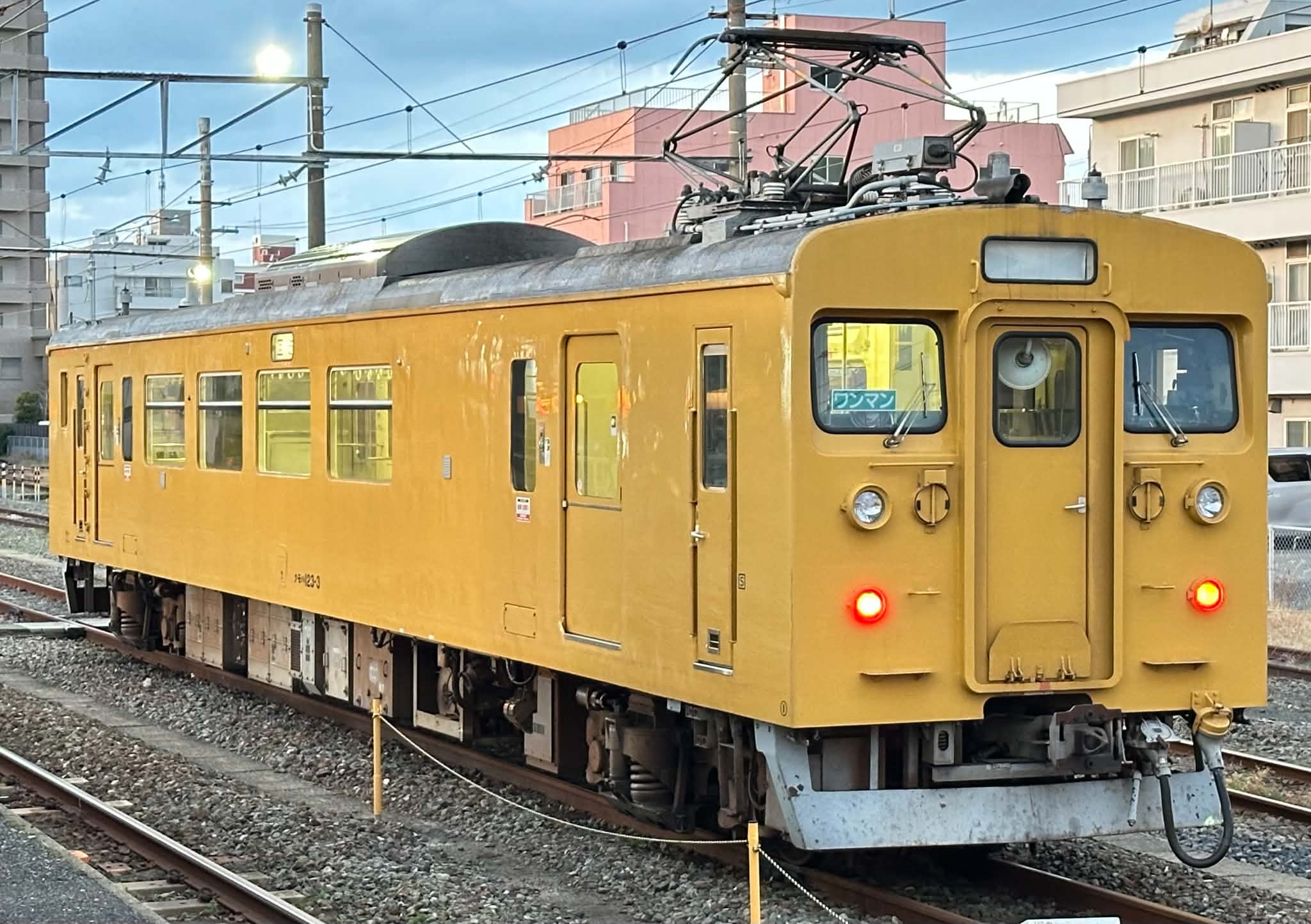
JR West KuMoHa 123-3 in "Setouchi yellow" livery in December 2025

===== KuMoHa 123-5 and 123-6 =====
These two cars were converted in April 1987 at JNR Suita Works from former baggage cars KuMoNi 143-7 and 143-8 respectively, initially for use on Hanwa Line Higashi-Hagoromo Branch Line services. The original pantographs at the No. 1 end were removed on conversion. From June 1995 the two cars operated on various lines including the Uno Line and the Fukuen Line before being transferred to Shimonoseki Depot in 2003 for use on the Onoda Line and the Ube Line.

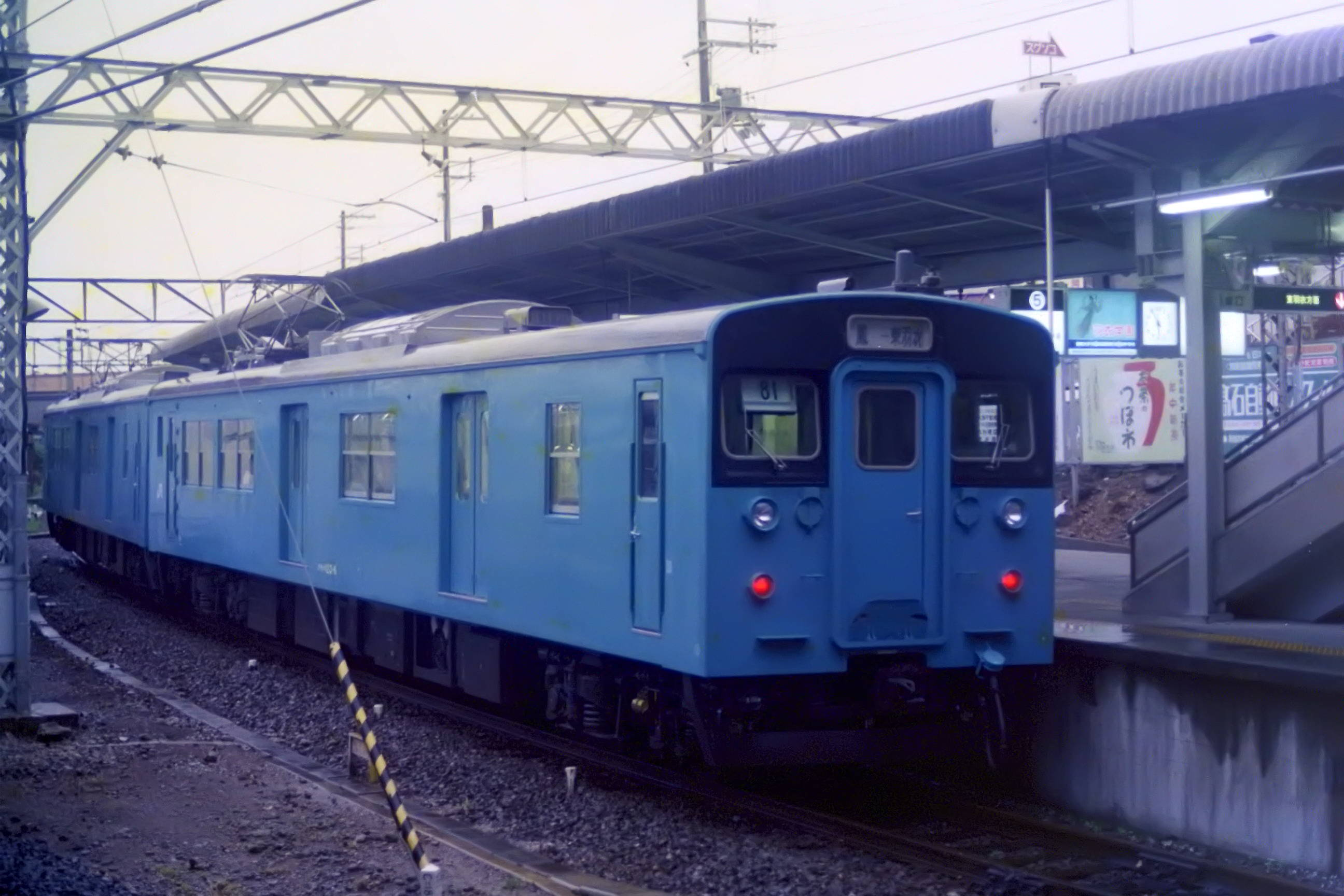
JR West KuMoHa 123-5 in Hanwa Line branch livery in August 1987

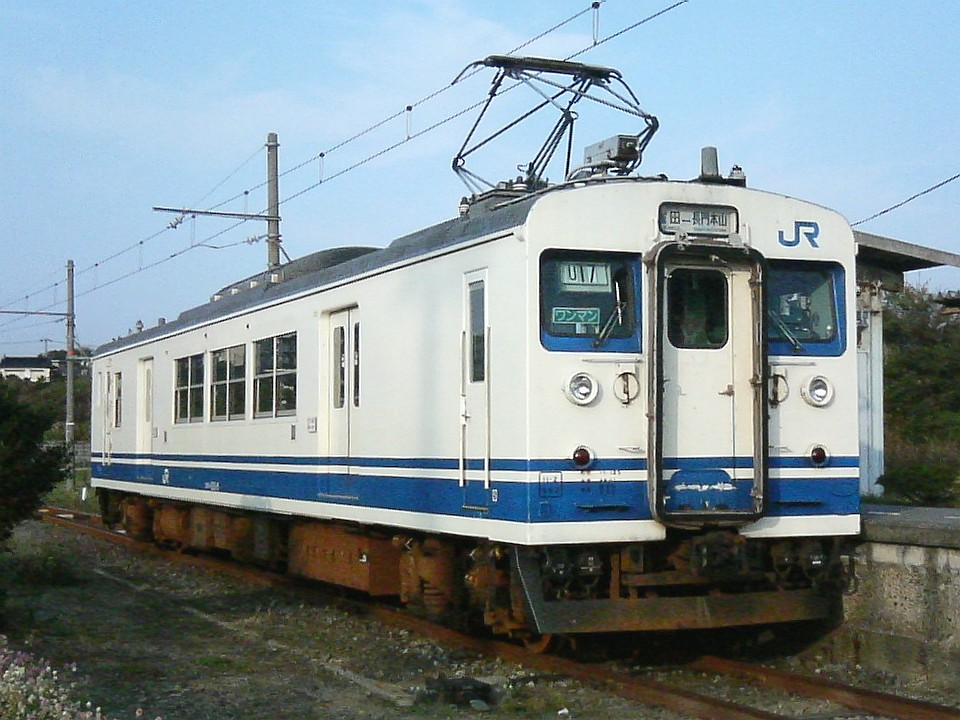
JR West KuMoHa 123-6 in October 2006

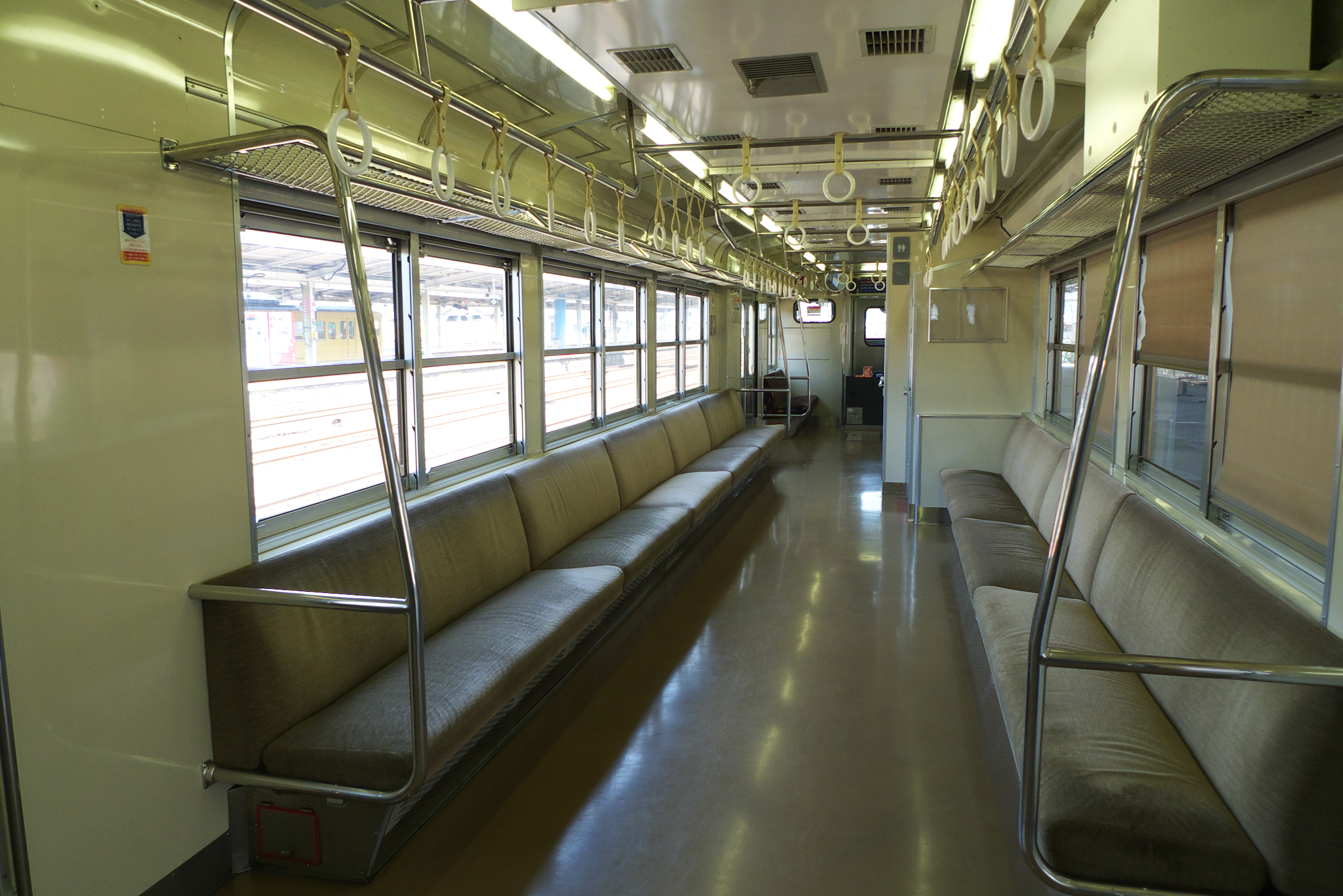
Interior of JR West car KuMoHa 123-6 in April 2014

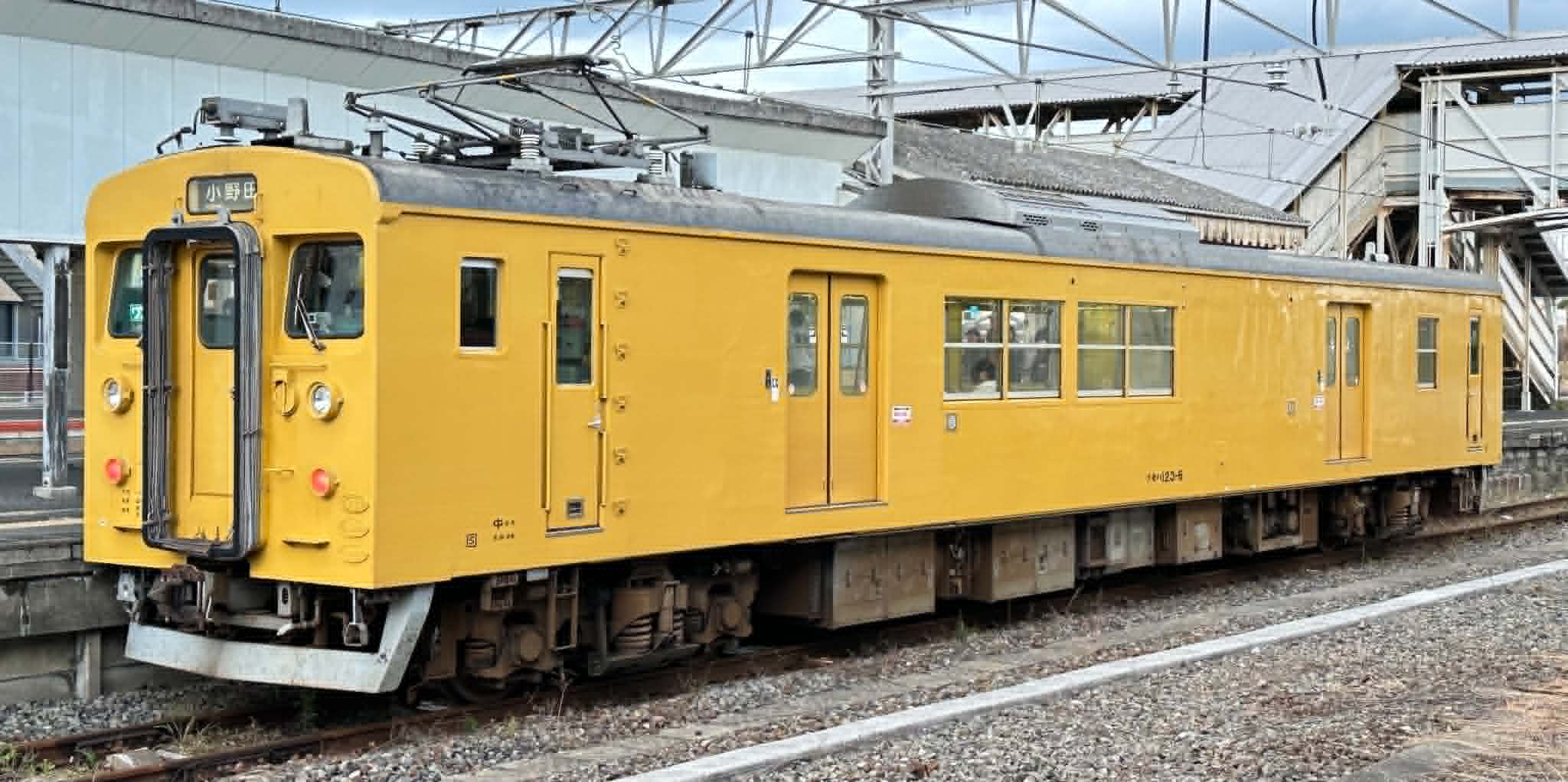
JR West KuMoHa 123-6 in "Setouchi Yellow" livery in December 2025

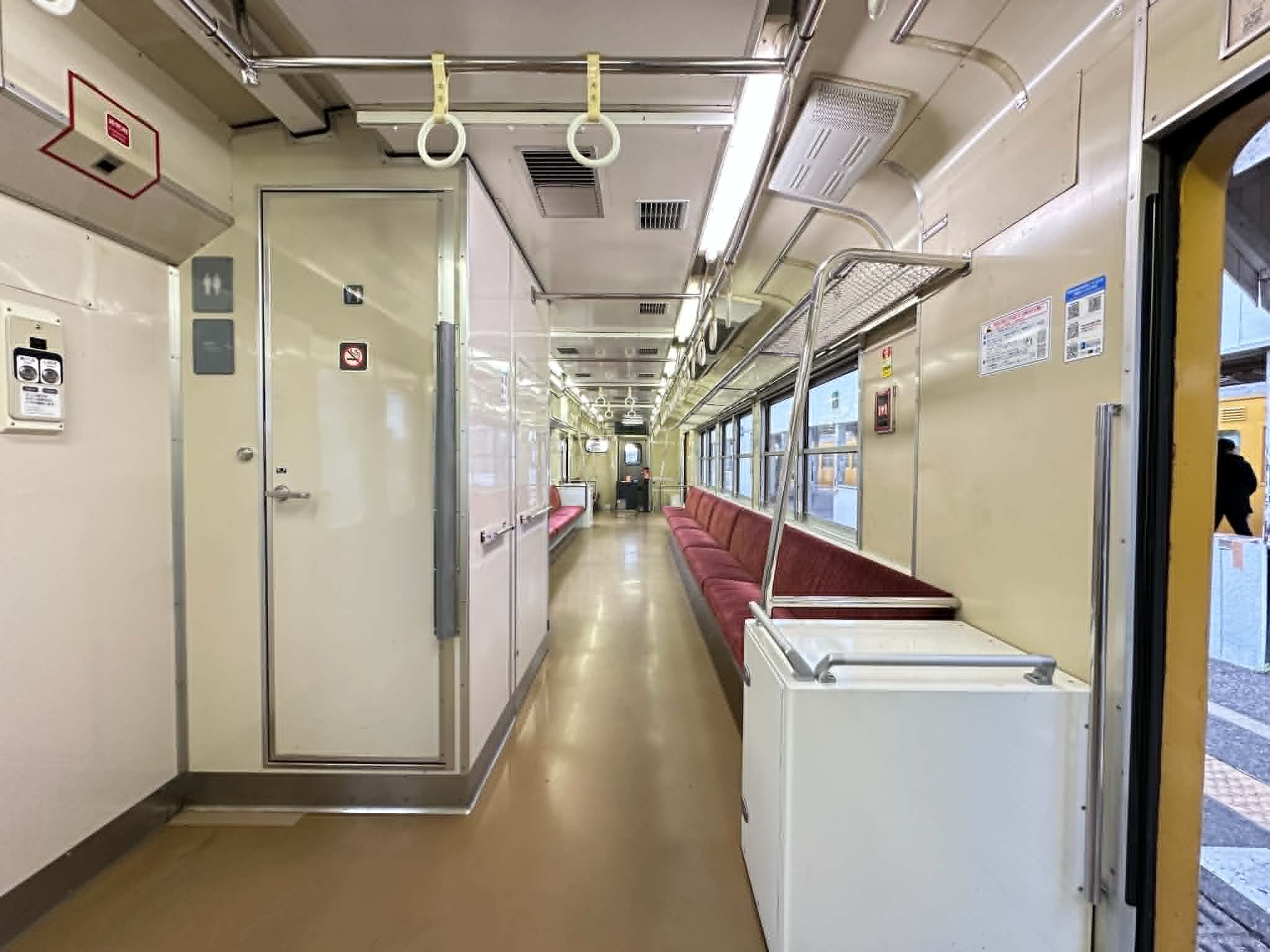
Interior of JR West car KuMoHa 123-6 in December 2025

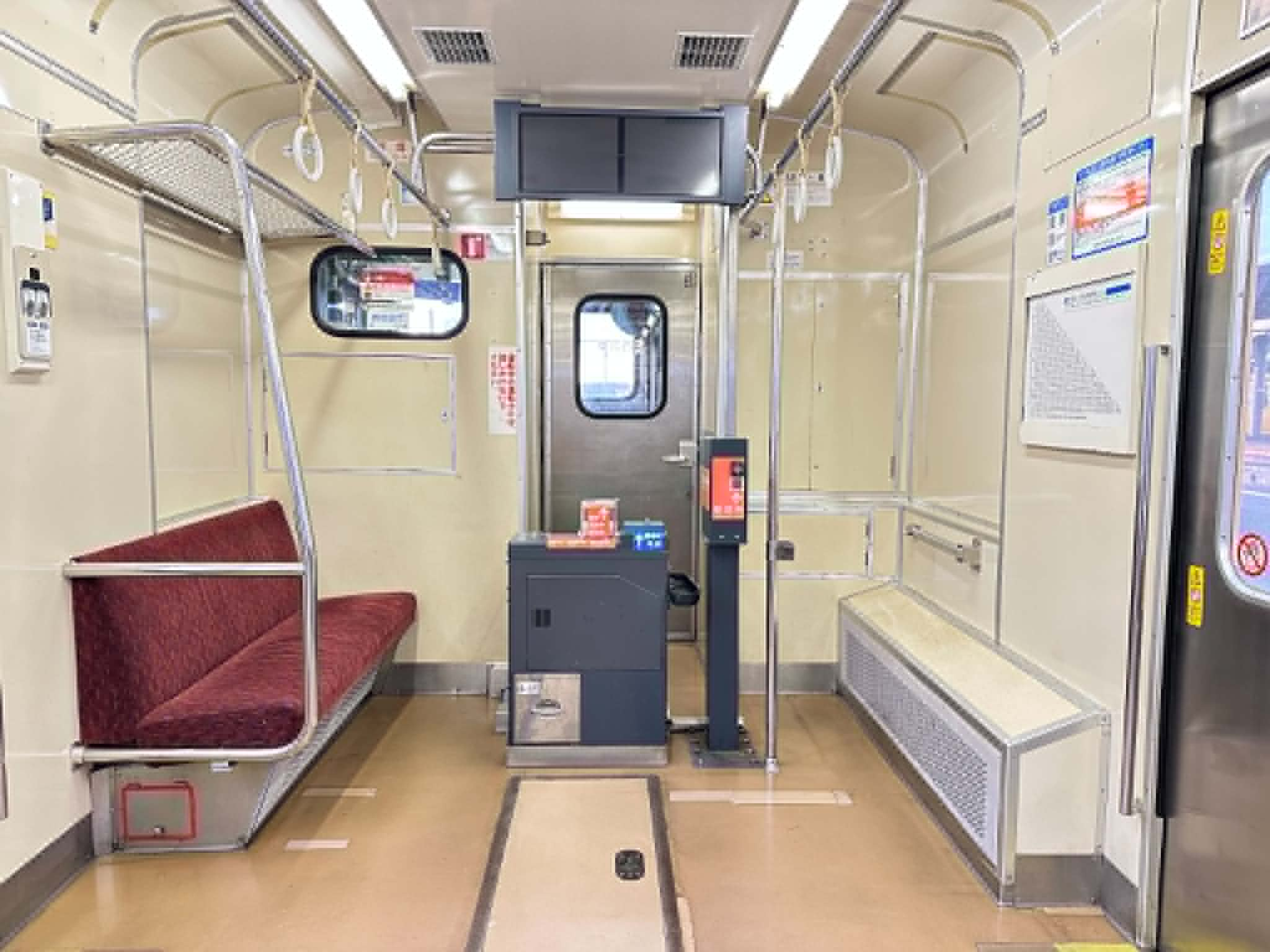
Interior of JR West car KuMoHa 123-6 in December 2025

=== JR Central ===
JR Central inherited five cars from JNR: KuMoHa 123-41 to 123-45 in April 1987. In March 1988 they converted an additional two cars: KuMoHa 123-601 and 123-602. All seven cars operated on the Minobu Line.

==== 123-40 series: KuMoHa 123-41 to 123-45 ====
These five cars were converted from former post and baggage cars KuMoYuNi 147-1 to 147-5 in January 1987.

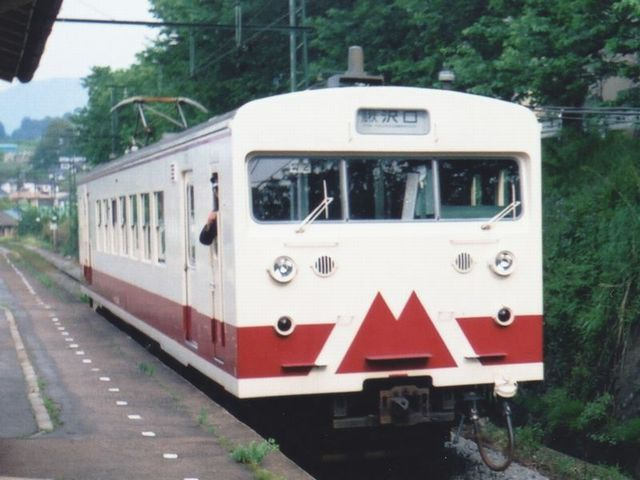
JR Central KuMoHa 123-42 in original Minobu Line livery in May 1989

==== 123-5040 series: KuMoHa 123-5041 to 123-5045 ====
The five 123-40 series cars (KuMoHa 123-41 to 123-45) were modified in June 1989 at Hamamatsu Works by JR Central, with the addition of inverter-controlled air-conditioning, and renumbered KuMoHa 123-5041 to 123-5045.

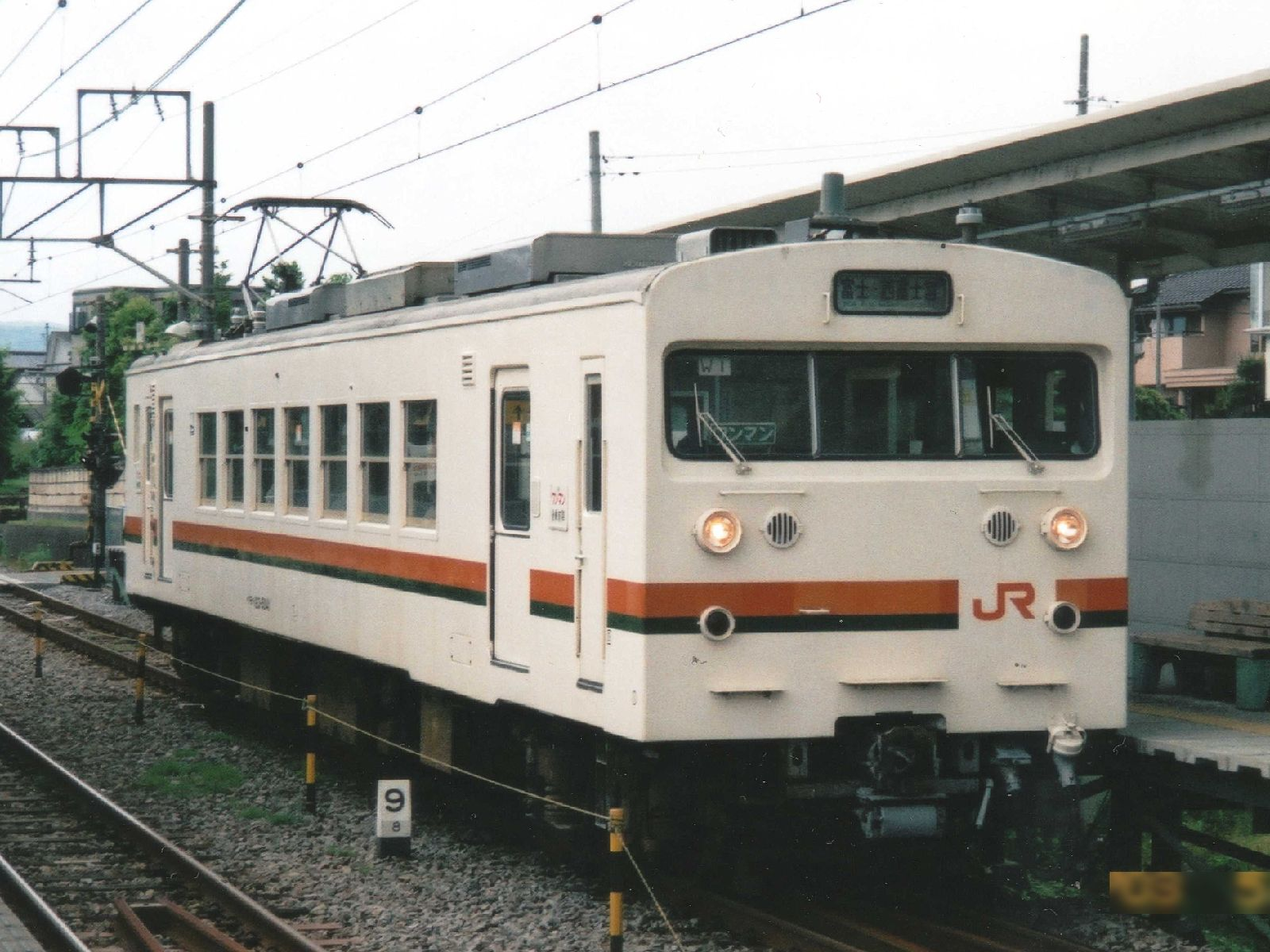
JR Central KuMoHa 123-5041 in May 2003

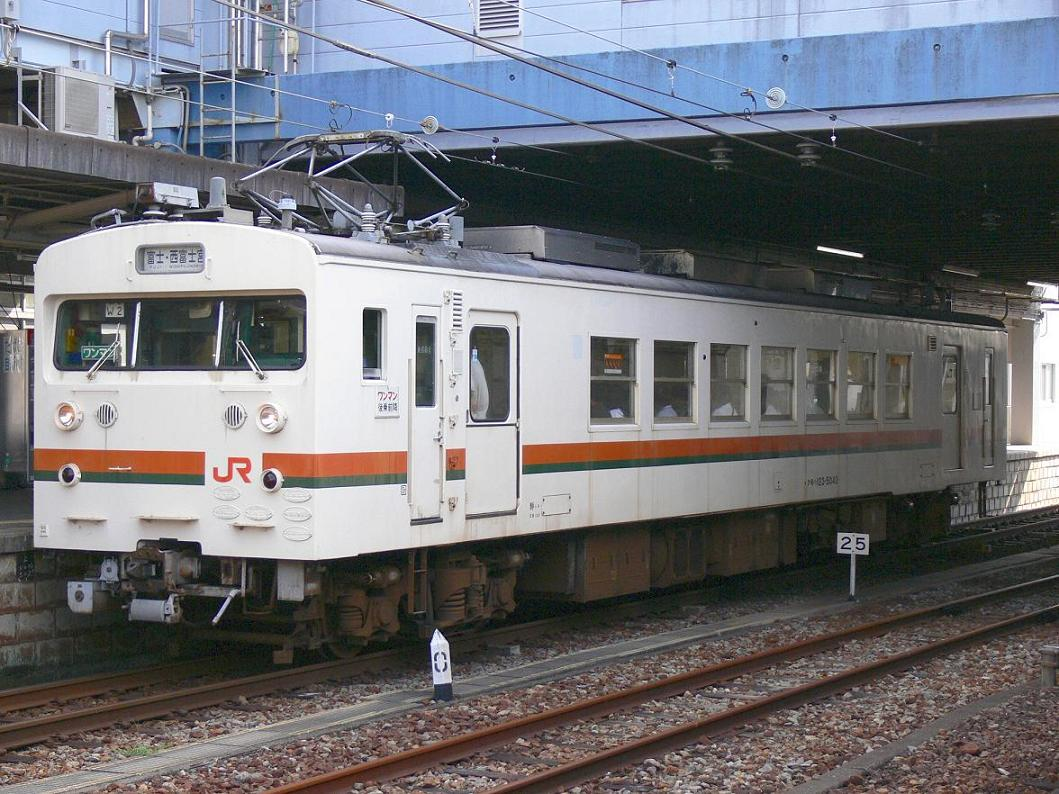
JR Central KuMoHa 123-5042 in September 2006

==== KuMoHa 123-5145 ====
The five 123-5040 series cars (KuMoHa 123-5041 to 123-5045) were further modified by JR Central between June 1989 and May 1990 for use on wanman (one-man) driver only operation services on the Minobu Line. Gangway doors were also added. Only KuMoHa 123-5045 was renumbered to KuMoHa 123-5145

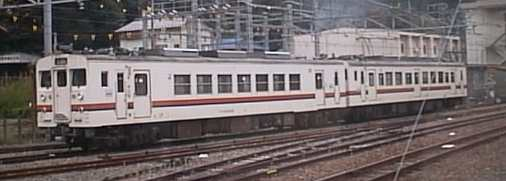
JR Central KuMoHa 123-5145 in October 2003

==== 123-600 series: KuMoHa 123-601 and 123-602 ====
These two cars were converted in March 1988 by JR Central at Hamamatsu Works from former tractor cars KuMoYa 143-601 and 143-602 respectively, for use on the Minobu Line. These cars had gangway doors at the ends, three sliding doors per side, and two pantographs. Inverter-controlled air-conditioning was added in December 1988.

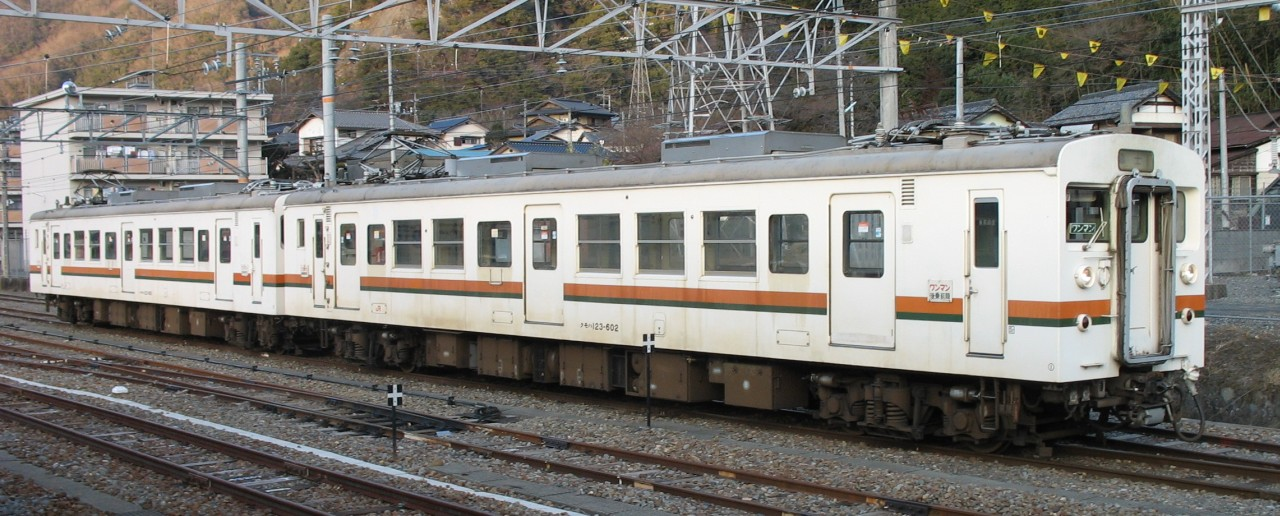
JR Central cars KuMoHa 123-601 and 602 in February 2006

==== Withdrawals and scrapping ====
All seven JR Central cars were withdrawn and scrapped between 2006 and 2007. Car 5041 was scrapped in September 2006, followed by cars 5044 and 5145 in January 2007. Following the 18 March 2007 timetable revision, the remaining four cars (5042, 5043, 601 and 602) were withdrawn and replaced by 313 series EMUs. Cars 601 and 5043 were scrapped in May 2007, followed by cars 602 and 5042 in June 2007.
