= Suzumeda Station =

Railway station in San'yō-Onoda, Yamaguchi Prefecture, Japan

Suzumeda Station 雀田駅
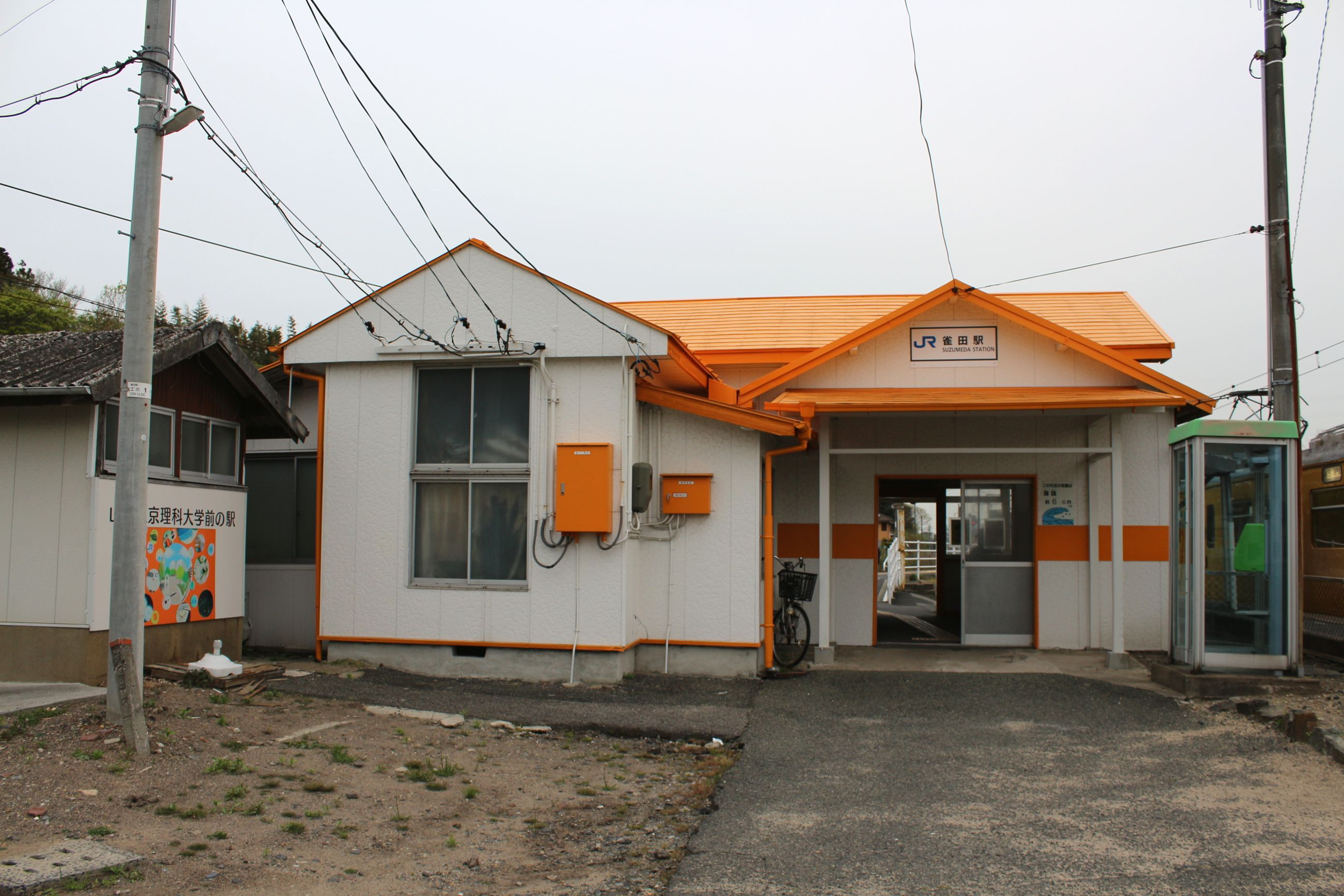
- Suzumeda Station in April 2021

General information
- Location: Onoda, San'yō-Onoda-shi, Yamaguchi-ken 756-0817; Japan
- Coordinates: 33°57′37.34″N 131°11′11.33″E
- Owner: West Japan Railway Company
- Operator: West Japan Railway Company
- Line: Onoda Line
- Distance: 4.5 km (2.8 miles) from Ube-Shinkawa
- Platforms: 2 side platform
- Tracks: 2
- Connections: Bus stop

Other information
- Status: Unstaffed
- Website: Official website

History
- Opened: 16 May 1929

Passengers
- FY2020: 95

Services
Preceding station	JR West	Following station
Nagato-Nagasawa towards Ube-Shinkawa	Onoda Line	Onodakō towards Onoda
Nagato-Nagasawa towards Ube-Shinkawa	Onoda Line	Hamagōchi Motoyama Branch towards Nagato-Motoyama
Location
- Location within Yamaguchi Prefecture Location within Japan

Suzumeda Station (雀田駅, Suzumeda-eki) is a passenger railway station located in the city of San'yō-Onoda, Yamaguchi Prefecture, Japan. It is operated by the West Japan Railway Company (JR West). It is the diverging point between the main and branch lines of the Onoda Line.

== Lines ==
Suzumeda Station is served by the JR West Onoda Line, and is located 4.5 kilometers from the junction of the San'yō Main Line at Inō and 6.3 kilometers from terminus of the line at Ube-Shinkawa.

== Station layout ==
The station consists of two unnumbered side platforms serving two tracks in a Y-shaped configuration. The station building is located in between the platforms. The station is unattended.

== Platforms ==
South	■ Onoda Line	for Nagato-Motoyama for Ube-Shinkawa
North	■ Onoda Line	for Ube-Shinkawa; Onodakō and Onoda

== History ==
Suzumeda Station was opened as a temporary stop on 16 May 1929 on the Onoda Railway and was elevated to full passenger station status on 1 December 1941. The Onoda Railway was railway nationalized in 1943. With the privatization of the Japan National Railway (JNR) on 1 April 1987, the station came under the aegis of the West Japan railway Company (JR West).

== Passenger statistics ==
In fiscal 2020, the station was used by an average of 95 passengers daily.

== Surrounding area ==
The station is located in the southern part of Sanyo-Onoda, near the border with Ube City. Sanyo Onoda Municipal Yamaguchi Tokyo University of Science is located about 400m south of this station, and some people use it to commute to the university. In spite of that, the area in front of the station is deserted with few shops. The stores are concentrated around Sanyo Onoda City Yamaguchi Tokyo University of Science.

- Sanyo Onoda City Yamaguchi Tokyo University of Science
- Sanyo Onoda Municipal Ryuo Junior High School
- Onoda Red Cross Hospital
- Tsukanokawa Kofun Park

== See also ==
- List of railway stations in Japan
