= Onoda Line =

Railway line in Yamaguchi prefecture, Japan

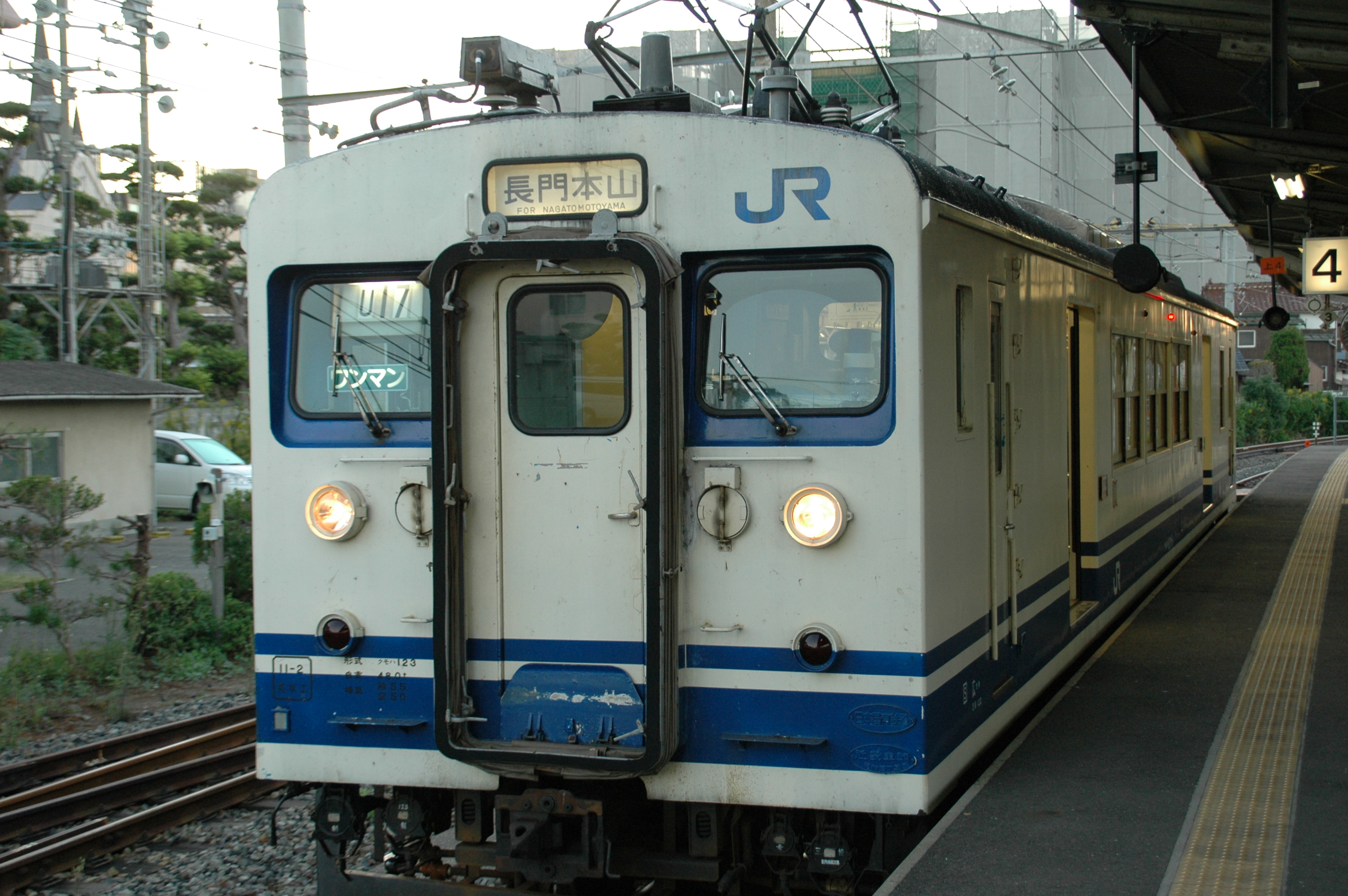
- A 123 series EMU

Overview
- Owner: JR West
- Locale: Yamaguchi Prefecture
- Termini: Inō; Onoda
- Stations: 11; 9 (main line), 2 (branch line excluding Suzumeda)

Service
- Type: Regional rail

Technical
- Line length: 11.6 km (7.2 mi)
- Track gauge: 1,067 mm (3 ft 6 in)
- Electrification: 1,500 V DC, overhead lines
Route map
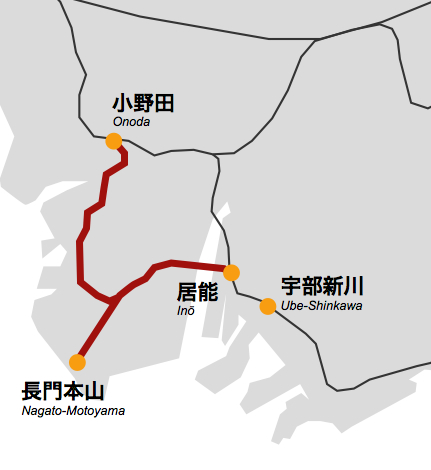

The Onoda Line (小野田線, Onoda-sen) is a railway line in Yamaguchi Prefecture, Japan, operated by the West Japan Railway Company (JR West). The line connects Ube-Shinkawa Station in Ube and Onoda Station in San'yō-Onoda. The Motoyama Branch Line (本山支線, Motoyama-shisen), which runs from Suzemeda to Motoyama, is part of this line.

== Stations ==
All stations are in Yamaguchi Prefecture.

=== Main Line ===
Line	Name		Distance (km)	Transfers	Location
Ube	Ube-Shinkawa	宇部新川	1.8	■ Ube Line (to Shin-Yamaguchi)	Ube
Ube	Inō	居能	0.0	■ Ube Line (to Ube)	Ube
Onoda	Inō	居能	0.0	■ Ube Line (to Ube)	Ube
Onoda	Tsumazaki	妻崎	2.5		Ube
Onoda	Nagato-Nagasawa	長門長沢	3.2		Ube
Onoda	Suzumeda	雀田	4.5	■ Motoyama Branch Line	San'yō-Onoda
Onoda	Onodakō	小野田港	6.5		San'yō-Onoda
Onoda	Minami-Onoda	南小野田	7.1		San'yō-Onoda
Onoda	Minami-Nakagawa	南中川	8.3		San'yō-Onoda
Onoda	Mede	目出	9.7		San'yō-Onoda
Onoda	Onoda	小野田	11.6	■ Sanyō Main Line	San'yō-Onoda

=== Motoyama Branch Line ===
Name		Distance (km)	Transfers	Location
Suzumeda	雀田	0.0	■ Onoda Line	San'yō-Onoda
Hamagōchi	浜河内	1.3		San'yō-Onoda
Nagato-Motoyama	長門本山	2.3		San'yō-Onoda

== Rolling stock ==
- 105 series 2-car EMUs
- 123 series single-car EMUs

== History ==
The Onoda Light Railway Co. opened the Onoda – Minami-Onoda section in 1915 to service a cement plant.

The Ube Electric Railway Co. opened the Ino – Shin-Okiyama station (since closed) section in 1929, electrified at 600 VDC. The branch to Motoyama opened in 1937, also electrified at 600 VDC.

Both companies were nationalised in 1943, and in 1947 the lines were connected, resulting in the closure of Shin-Okiyama station, the replacement for which was nearby Minami-Onoda station.

In 1950 the Onoda – Minami-Onoda section was electrified and the voltage increased to 1500 VDC on the balance of the line.

CTC signalling was commissioned in 1983, and freight services ceased in 1986.

"One-man" driver only operation commenced on the branch line between Suzumeda and Nagato-Motoyama on 11 March 1989, using KuMoHa 42 EMUs. Driver only (conductorless) operation commenced on the main line between Inō and Onoda on 1 June 1990, using 105 series EMUs.
