= Sanyo-Onoda City University =

Higher education institution in Yamaguchi Prefecture, Japan

Coordinates: 33°57′25″N 131°11′16″E

- 山陽小野田市立山口東京理科大学
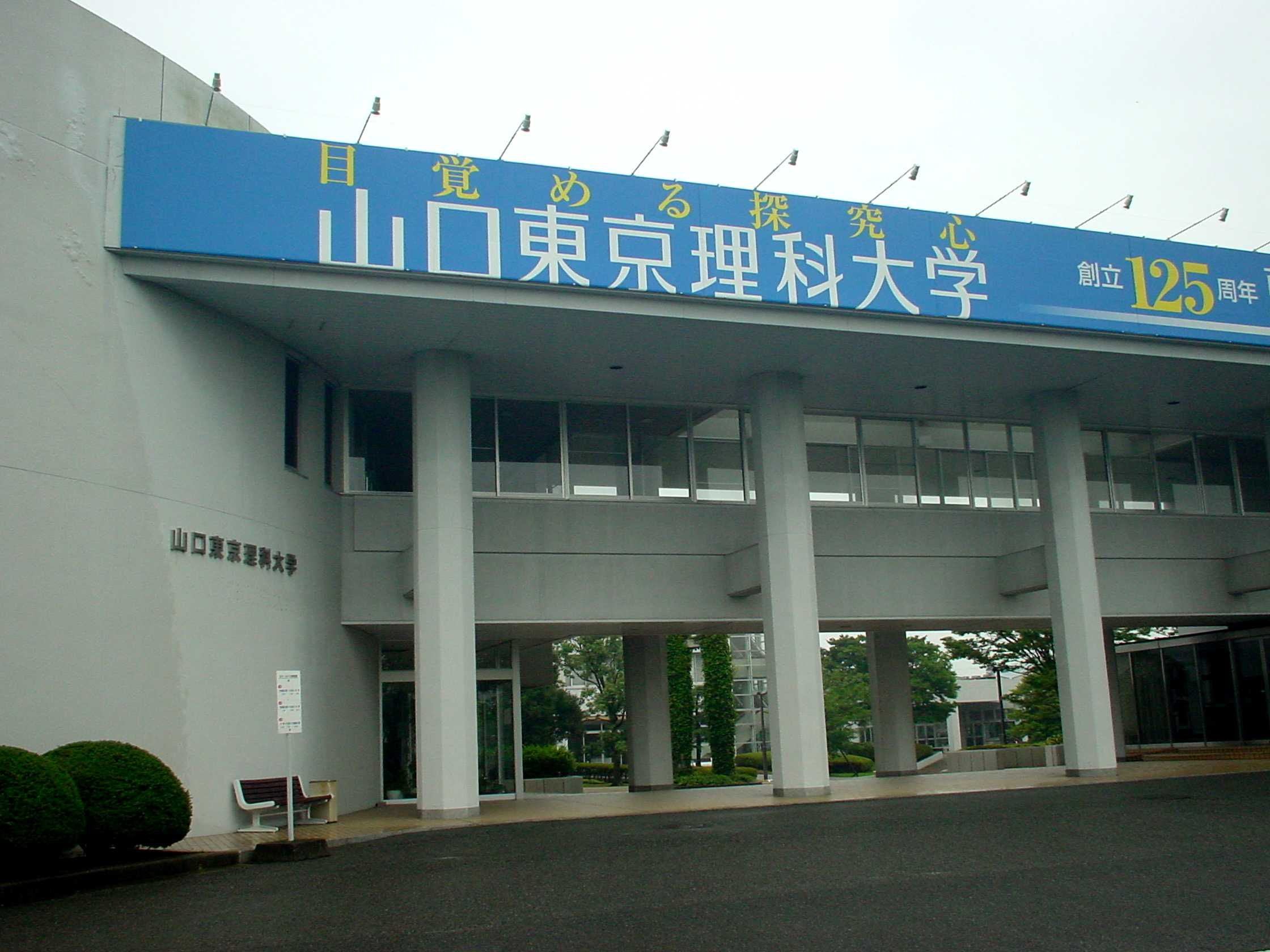
- Type: Public
- Established: 1987
- President: Yuji Nagasaka
- Location: 1-1-1, Daigakudori, San'yō-Onoda, Yamaguchi, 756-0884, Japan
- Language: Japanese
- Website: www.socu.ac.jp/en/

Sanyo-Onoda City University (山陽小野田市立山口東京理科大学, San'yō-Onoda shiritsu Yamaguchi tōkyō rika daigaku) is a public university in San'yō-Onoda, Yamaguchi, Japan. The school was first established as a junior college in 1987. It became a four-year college in 1995.

== Faculty & Graduate Schools ==
- Faculty of Engineering
  - Department of Mechanical Engineering
  - Department of Electrical Engineering
  - Department of Applied Chemistry
- Faculty of Pharmaceutical Sciences
  - Department of Pharmaceutical Sciences
- Graduate School of Engineering
  - Department of Engineering
