= Onoda, Yamaguchi =

Dissolved municipality in Yamaguchi prefecture, Japan

Onoda (小野田市, Onoda-shi) was a city located in Yamaguchi Prefecture, Japan. The city was founded on November 3, 1940.

As of 2003, the city had an estimated population of 44,953 and the density of 1,044.20 persons per km^{2}. The total area was 43.05 km^{2}.

On March 22, 2005, Onoda, along with the town of San'yō (from Asa District), was merged to create the city of San'yō-Onoda.
