= San'yō, Yamaguchi =

Dissolved municipality in Japan

San'yō (山陽町, San'yō-cho) is a town located in Asa District, Yamaguchi Prefecture, Japan.

As of 2003, the town has an estimated population of 22,131 and a density of 246.42 persons per km^{2}. The total area is 89.81 km^{2}.

On March 22, 2005, San'yō, along with the city of Onoda, was merged to create the city of San'yō-Onoda.
