= San'yō-Onoda =

San'yō-Onoda 山陽小野田市
- City
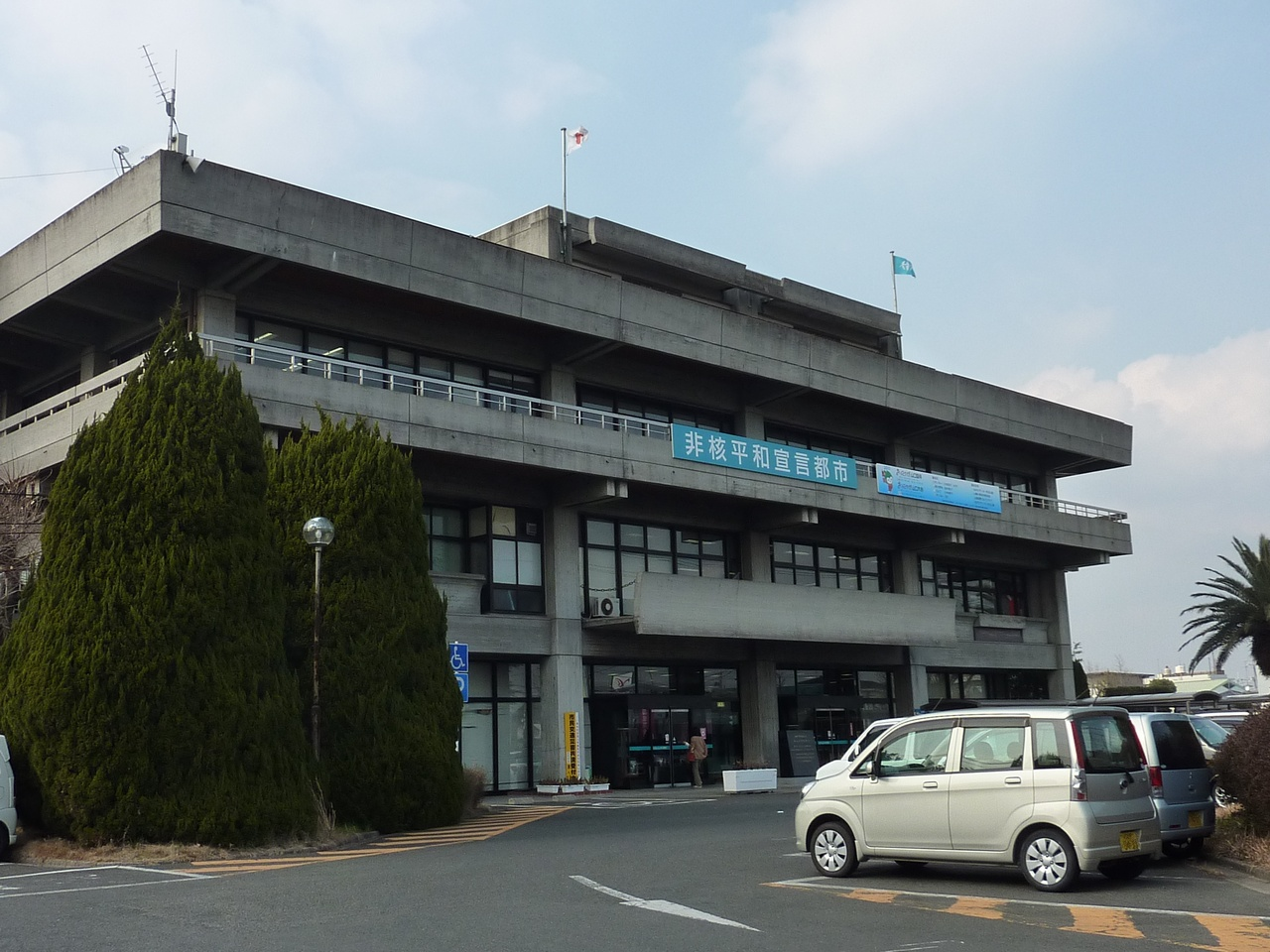
- San'yō-Onoda city hall

- Flag Seal
- Location of San'yō-Onoda in Yamaguchi Prefecture

- Location in Japan
- Coordinates: 34°00′11″N 131°10′55″E
- Country: Japan
- Region: Chūgoku (San'yō)
- Prefecture: Yamaguchi

Government
  - Mayor: Hirofumi Shirai

Area
  - Total: 133.09 km^{2} (51.39 sq mi)

Population (May 31, 2023)
  - Total: 59,867
  - Density: 449.82/km^{2} (1,165.0/sq mi)
- Time zone: UTC+09:00 (JST)
- City hall address: 1-1-1 Hinode, Sanyo-Onoda-shi, Yamaguchi-ken 756-8601
- Website: Official website
- Symbols
- Flower: Azalea
- Tree: Round Leaf Holly

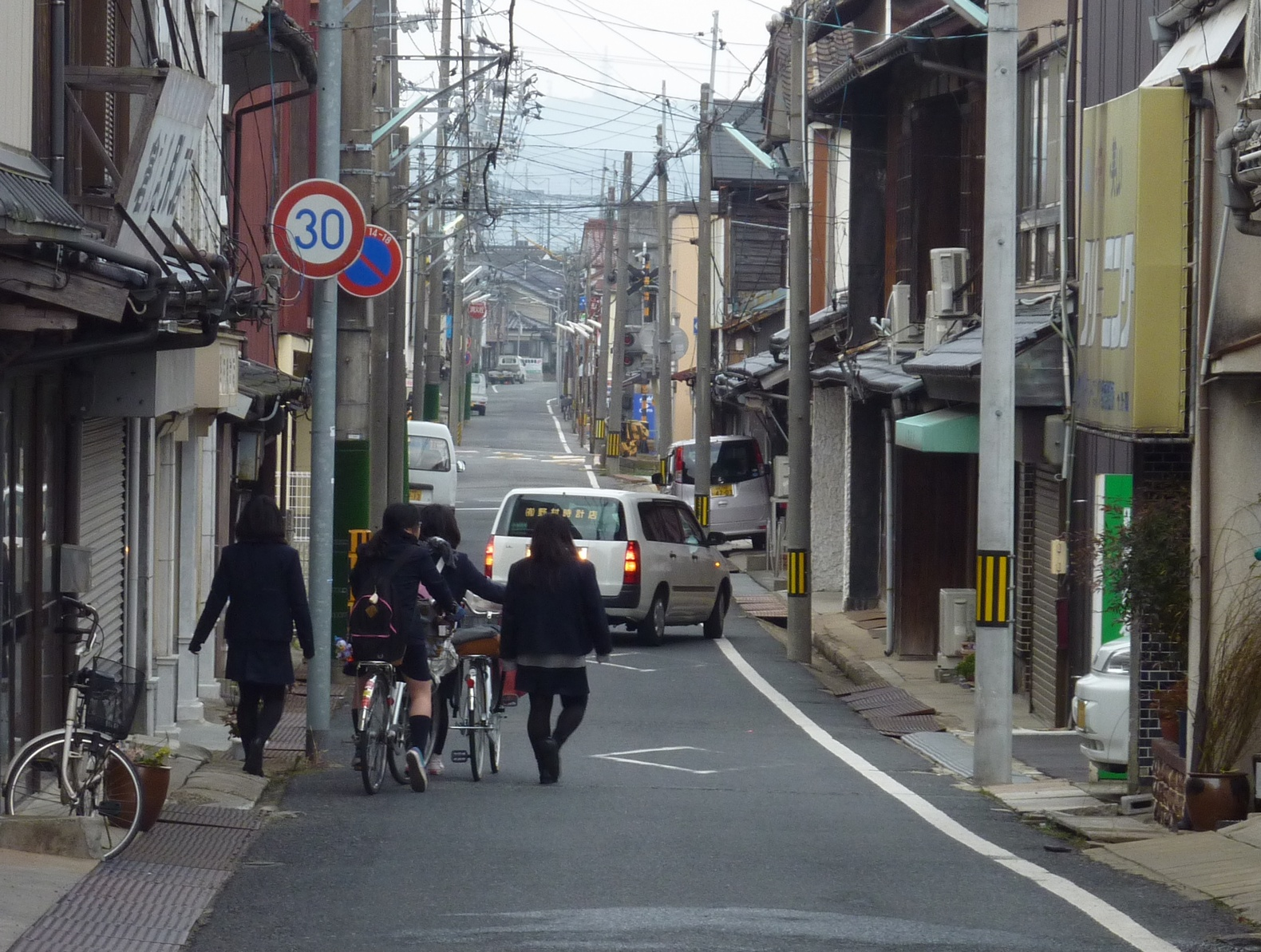
street in San'yō-Onoda

San'yō-Onoda (山陽小野田市, San'yō-Onoda-shi) is a city located in Yamaguchi Prefecture, Japan. As of 31 May 2023, the city had an estimated population of 59,867 in 29,122 households and a population density of 530 persons per km^{2}. The total area of the city is 133.09 square kilometres (51.39 sq mi).

== Geography ==
San'yō-Onoda is located in the southwestern part of Yamaguchi Prefecture. It is long in the north-south direction and has a fan shape that opens to the Seto Inland Sea. The Asa River flows from the north to the central area, and the Ariho River flows from the northeast to the east, flowing south into the Seto Inland Sea. The city hall is located on the west bank of the Ariho River mouth.

=== Neighbouring municipalities ===
Yamaguchi Prefecture

- Mine
- Shimonoseki
- Ube

=== Climate ===
San'yō-Onoda has a humid subtropical climate (Köppen climate classification Cfa) with very warm summers and cool winters. The average annual temperature in Hikari is 16.3 °C. The average annual rainfall is 1732 mm with September as the wettest month. The temperatures are highest on average in July, at around 27.1 °C, and lowest in January, at around 6.4 °C.

== Demographics ==
Per Japanese census data, the population of San'yō-Onoda peaked in the 1960s, and has remained relatively steady since the 1970s

Historical population
Year	Pop.	±%
1940	66,014	—
1950	79,240	+20.0%
1960	82,498	+4.1%
1970	64,536	−21.8%
1980	68,312	+5.9%
1990	69,481	+1.7%
2000	67,429	−3.0%
2010	64,566	−4.2%
Hikari population statistics

== History ==
The area of San'yō-Onoda was part of an ancient Nagato Province. During the Edo Period, the area was part of the holdings of Chōshū Domain. Following the Meiji restoration, the villages of Asai, Sue, and Takachiho were established within Asa District, Yamaguchi with the creation of the modern municipalities system on April 1, 1889. Asai became the town of Asa on October 1, 1918 and Sue was elevated to town status on April 3, 1920 and renamed Onoda. Takachiho was elevated to town status on April 1, 1938 and merged with Onoda on November 3, 1940 to become the city of Onoda. Asa merged with the town of Habu to form the town of San'yō on September 30, 1956. Onoda and San'yo merged to form the city of San'yō-Onoda on March 22, 2005.

== Government ==
San'yō-Onoda has a mayor-council form of government with a directly elected mayor and a unicameral city council of 22 members. San'yō-Onoda contributes three members to the Yamaguchi Prefectural Assembly. In terms of national politics, the city is part of the Yamaguchi 3rd district of the lower house of the Diet of Japan.

== Economy ==
San'yō-Onoda is an industrial city centered on the chemical industry based on cement and oil refining. Along with neighboring Ube, it is part of the Setouchi industrial area.

== Education ==
San'yō-Onoda has 13 public elementary school and six public junior high schools operated by the city government, and three public high schools operated by the Yamaguchi Prefectural Board of Education. There is also one private high school. The city operated San'yō-Onoda City University (formerly the Tokyo University of Science, Yamaguchi) is located in San'yō-Onoda

== Transportation ==
=== Railway ===
JR West (JR West) - San'yō Shinkansen

- Asa

JR West (JR West) - San'yō Main Line

- Onoda - Asa - Habu

JR West (JR West) - Onoda Line (Main line)

- Suzumeda - Onodakō - Minami-Onoda - Minami-Nakagawa - Mede - Onoda

JR West (JR West) - Onoda Line (Motoyama branch line)

- Suzumeda - Hamagōchi - Nagato-Motoyama

JR West (JR West) - Mine Line

- Asa - Yunotō

=== Highways ===
- San'yō Expressway
- Chugoku Expressway
- National Route 2
- National Route 190
- National Route 316

== Sister cities ==
- Chichibu, Saitama, Japan since May 20, 1996
- Moreton Bay, Australia since August 18, 1992

== Notable people ==
- Minoru Fujita, Japanese professional wrestler
- Yohei Kurakawa, Japanese football player
- Aoki Shūzō, former Foreign Minister in Meiji period Japan
