= 105 series =

Japanese train type

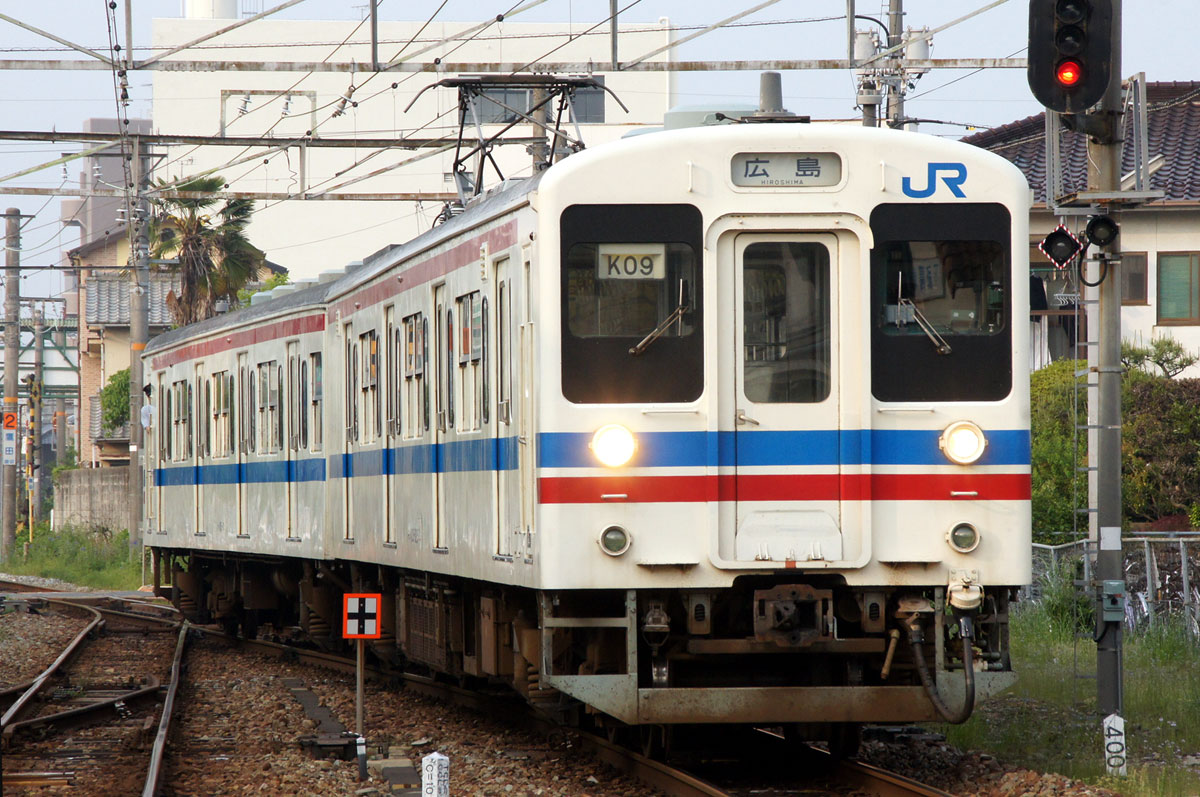
- Set K09 on a Kabe Line service in May 2012
- Replaced: 70 series (Fukuen Line)
- Constructed: 1981–1990
- Entered service: 1981
- Refurbished: 2019–present
- Number built: 60 vehicles 62 vehicles (converted from 103-1000 series); 4 vehicles (converted from 103-0 series)
- Number in service: 84 vehicles (42 sets)
- Number scrapped: 42 vehicles
- Successor: 227 series
- Formation: 2/4 cars per trainset
- Operators: JNR (1981–1987); JR East (1987–1998); JR-West (1987–present)
- Depots: Hineno, Okayama, Shimonoseki, Hiroshima
- Lines served: Kisei Main Line; Sanyō Main Line; Fukuen Line; Ube Line; Onoda Line

Specifications
- Car body construction: Steel
- Car length: 20,000 mm (65 ft 7 in)
- Width: 2,800 mm (9 ft 2 in)
- Doors: 3/4 pairs per side
- Maximum speed: 100 km/h (60 mph)
- Traction system: Resistor control
- Power output: 440 kW (590 hp) per car with motors
- Electric system: 1,500 V DC Overhead catenary
- Current collection: pantograph
- Braking systems: Dynamic brake, Electro-pneumatic brake, Hand brake
- Track gauge: 1,067 mm (3 ft 6 in)

The 105 series (105系, 105-kei) is a DC electric multiple unit (EMU) train type formerly operated by Japanese National Railways (JNR), and currently operated on local services by West Japan Railway Company (JR West) in Japan since 1981. They were also formerly operated by East Japan Railway Company (JR East).

== Overview ==
The 105 series was introduced in 1981 to replace early EMU types operating on the Fukuen Line, Ube Line, and Onoda Line in western Japan. The rural nature and low line speed of these lines meant that 101 series or 103 series commuter EMUs would have been unnecessarily over-powered with their high proportion of motored cars, and so the 105 series was designed with one motored car per two cars.

The first sets introduced were 105-0 series two-car sets which were newly built in 1981 with three pairs of doors per side. 105-500 series two-car sets were later introduced, converted from former 103 series EMU cars, with four pairs of doors per side.

As of 1 April 2012, 56 2-car sets are operated by JR-West, based at Hineno, Okayama, Shimonoseki, and Hiroshima depots.

== 105-0 series ==
60 105-0 series vehicles were built in 1981, formed as two-car sets for use on the Onoda Line and Ube Line, and four-car sets for use on the Fukuen Line. Initially, these sets were not equipped with air-conditioning.

=== Formations ===
These were originally formed as follows.

==== 4-car sets ====
KuMoHa 105	SaHa 105	MoHa 105	KuHa 104

The KuMoHa and MoHa cars were each equipped with one lozenge-type pantograph.

==== 2-car sets ====
KuMoHa 105	KuHa 104

The KuMoHa cars are equipped with one lozenge-type pantograph.

=== Interior ===
Seating accommodation consists of longitudinal bench seating throughout each car.

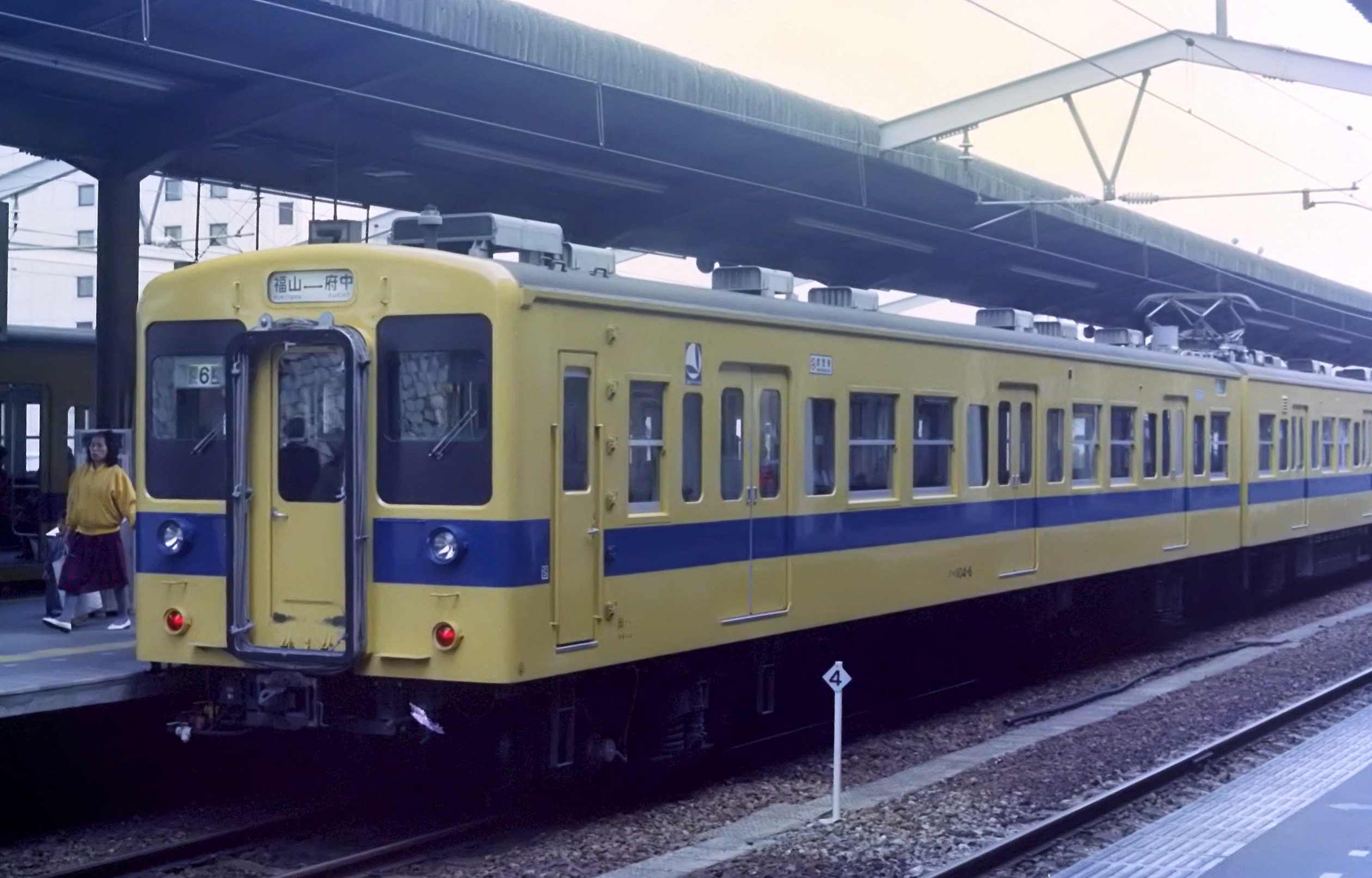
A non-air-conditioned 105-0 series set in Fukuen Line livery in 1987

== 105-500/600 series ==
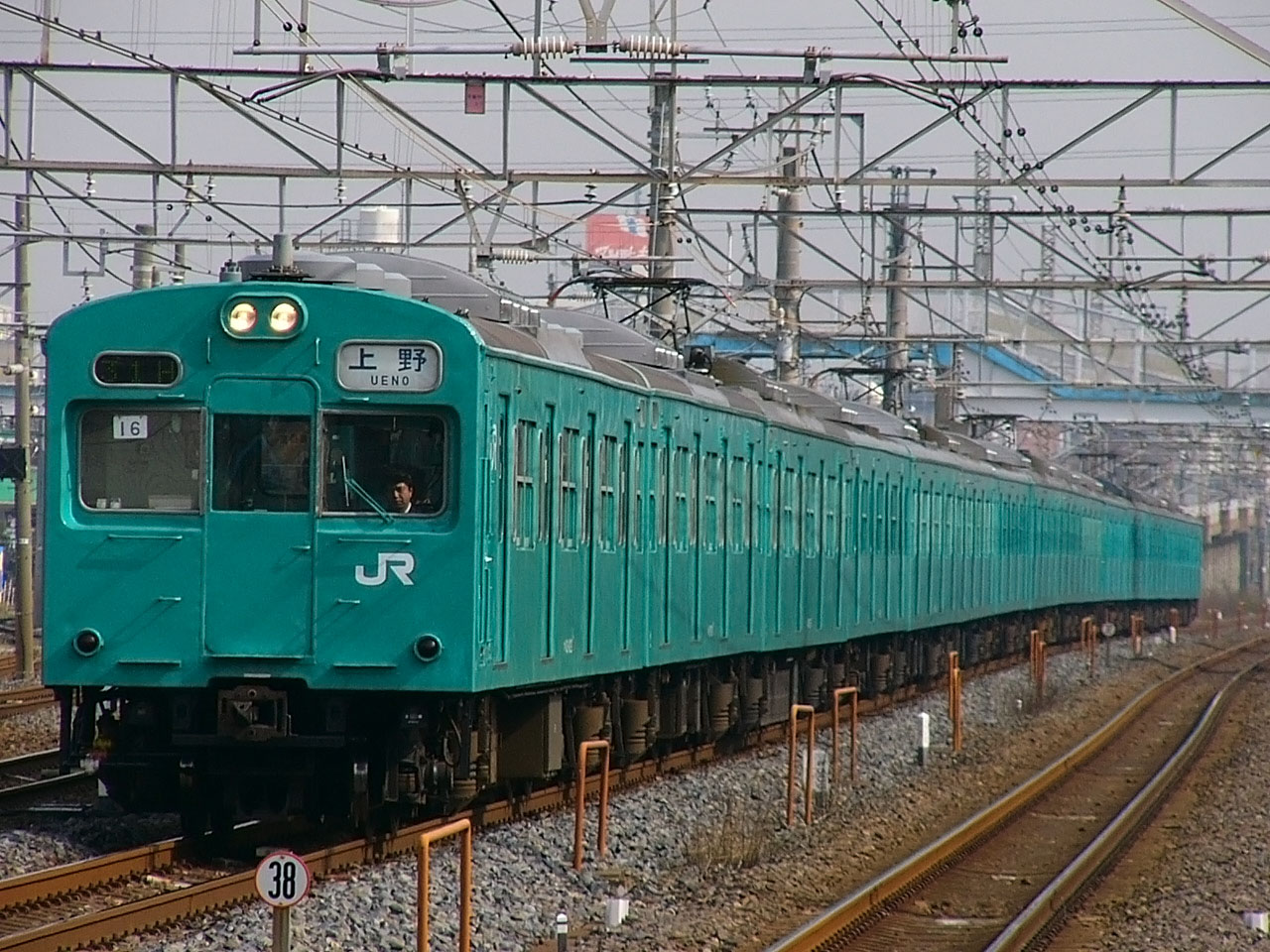
103-1000 series(for comparison)

The 105-500/600 series variant was introduced from October 1984, coinciding with the electrification of the Nara Line between Kyoto and Nara, and the Wakayama Line between Wakayama and Gojō. Budget restraints prevented the construction of new trains, and instead, former Jōban Line 103-1000 series EMU cars made surplus by the introduction of 203 series EMUs were modified with the addition of new cab ends to form 2-car 105-500 series sets.

== Senseki Line sets ==
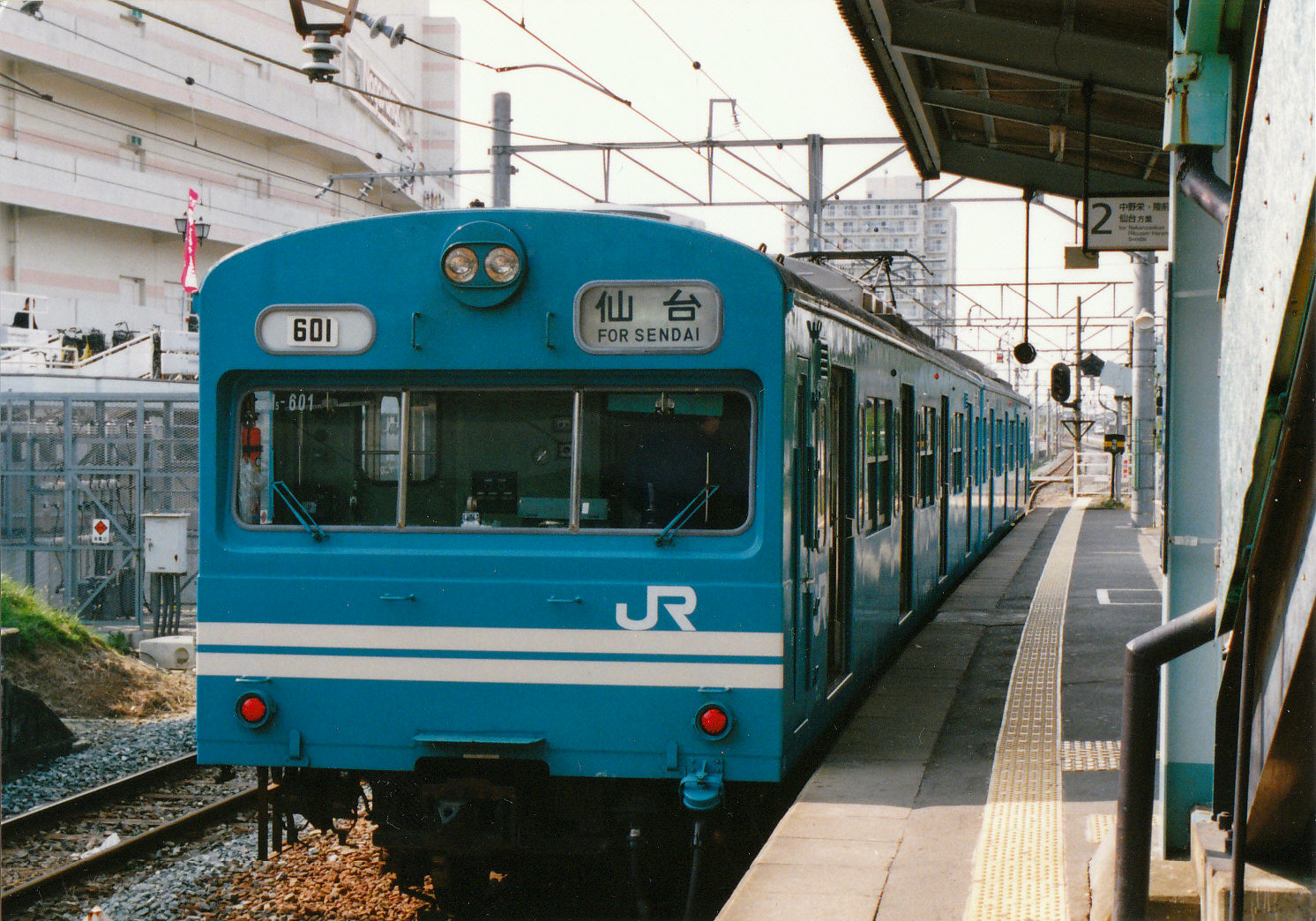
Senseki Line 2-car set, 1992

In March 1987, four former 103 series air-conditioned driving cars were converted to become 2-car 105 series sets for use on the Senseki Line in the Sendai area. These sets retained the original non-gangwayed 103 series cab ends.
