= Onodakō Station =

Railway station in San'yō-Onoda, Yamaguchi Prefecture, Japan

Onodakō Station 小野田港駅
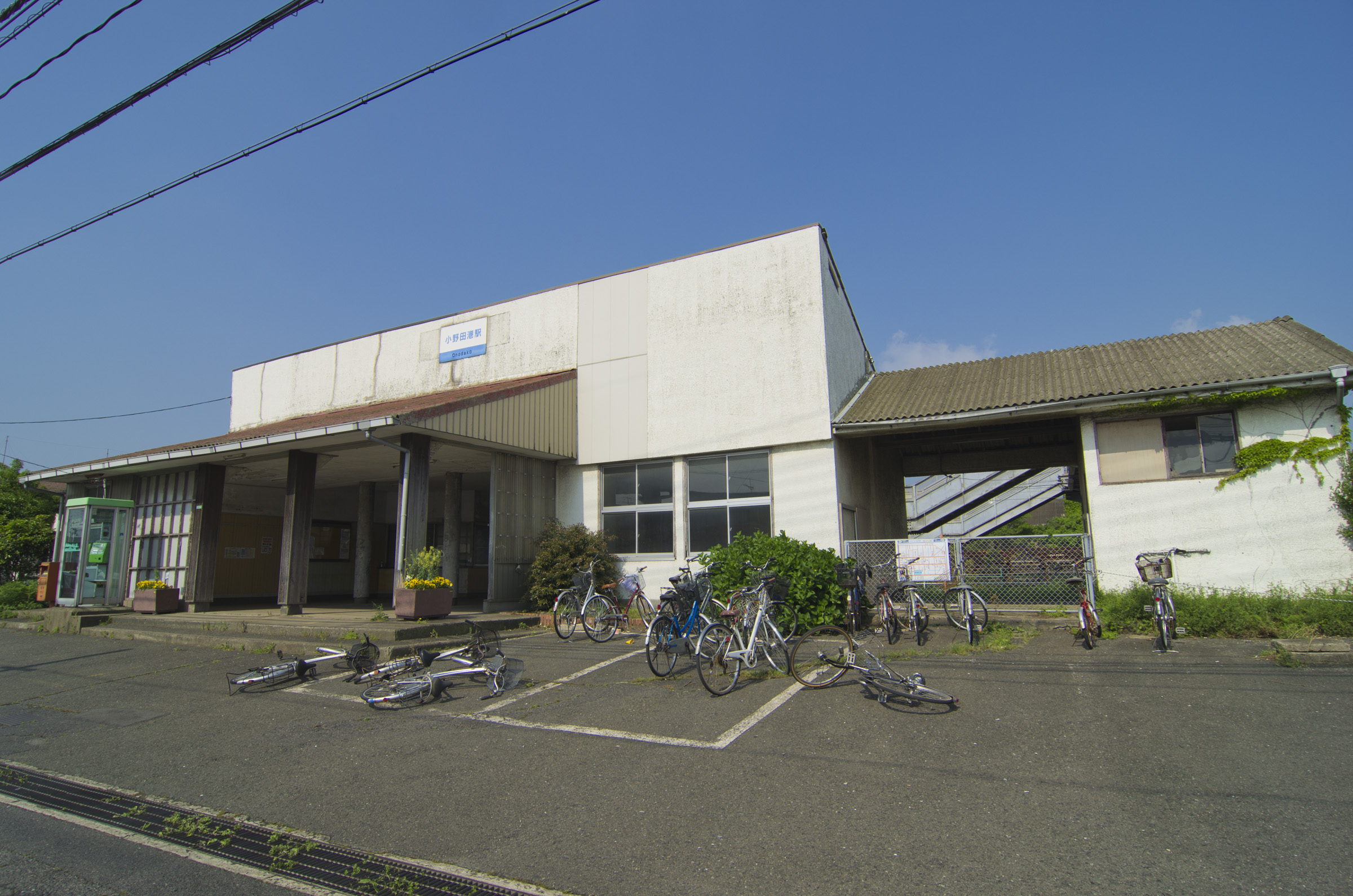
- Minami-Onoda Station in May 2012

General information
- Location: 4 Kitaryūōchō, San'yō-Onoda-shi, Yamaguchi-ken 756-0833; Japan
- Coordinates: 33°58′19.2″N 131°10′30.53″E
- Owner: West Japan Railway Company
- Operator: West Japan Railway Company
- Line: Onoda Line
- Distance: 6.5 km (4.0 miles) from Ube-Shinkawa
- Platforms: 2 side platforms
- Tracks: 2
- Connections: Bus stop

Construction
- Structure type: at grade

Other information
- Status: Unstaffed
- Website: Official website

History
- Opened: 25 November 1915; 110 years ago

Passengers
- FY2020: 74

Services
| Preceding station | JR West | Following station |
|---|---|---|
| Suzumeda towards Ube-Shinkawa | Onoda Line | Minami-Onoda towards Onoda |
Location
- Location within Yamaguchi Prefecture Location within Japan

Onodakō Station (小野田港駅, Onodakō-eki) is a passenger railway station located in the city of San'yō-Onoda, Yamaguchi Prefecture, Japan. It is operated by the West Japan Railway Company (JR West).

== Lines ==
Onodakō Station is served by the JR West Onoda Line, and is located 6.5 kilometers from the junction of the San'yō Main Line at Inō and 8.3 kilometers from terminus of the line at Ube-Shinkawa.

== Station layout ==
The station consists of two opposed unnumbered ground-level side platforms connected by a footbridge. The station is unattended.

== Platforms ==
| station side | ■ Onoda Line | for Ube-Shinkawa |
| opposite side | ■ Onoda Line | for Onoda |

== History ==
Onodakō Station was opened on 25 November 1915 as Cement-chō Station (セメント町駅) on the Onoda Railway. The Onoda Railway was railway nationalized in 1943, at which time the station name was changed to Onodakō Station (小野田港駅). On 1 October 1947 the section from Onodako Station to Suzumeda Station was completed and the station relocated to its present site. With the privatization of the Japan National Railway (JNR) on 1 April 1987, the station came under the aegis of the West Japan railway Company (JR West).

== Passenger statistics ==
In fiscal 2020, the station was used by an average of 74 passengers daily.

== Surrounding area ==
- Taiheiyo Cement
- Sanyo Onoda Municipal Sue Elementary School

== See also ==
- List of railway stations in Japan
