= Onoda Station =

Railway station in San'yō-Onoda, Yamaguchi Prefecture, Japan

Onoda Station 小野田駅
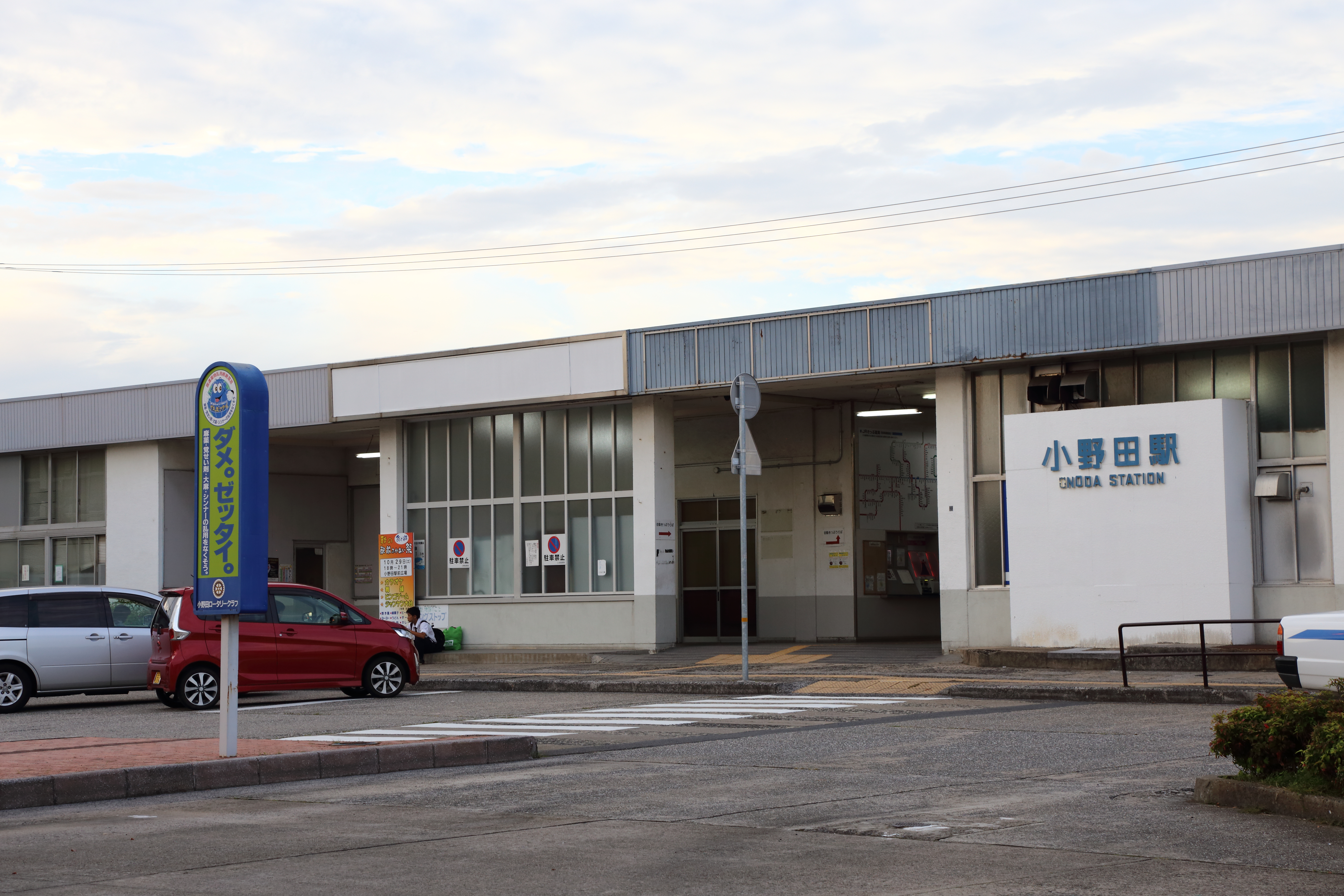
- Onoda Station in October 2016

General information
- Location: 1723-1, Ōaza Higashitakadomari,, San'yō-Onoda-shi, Yamaguchi-ken 756-0088; Japan
- Coordinates: 34°0′27.48″N 131°11′7″E
- Owner: West Japan Railway Company
- Operator: West Japan Railway Company
- Lines: San'yō Line; Onoda Line
- Distance: 488.0 km (303.2 miles) from Kobe
- Platforms: 2 island platforms
- Tracks: 4
- Connections: Bus stop

Other information
- Status: Staffed
- Website: Official website

History
- Opened: 3 December 1900

Passengers
- FY2022: 1162

Services
| Preceding station | JR West | Following station |
|---|---|---|
| Mede towards Ube-Shinkawa | Onoda Line | Terminus |
| Asa towards Shimonoseki | San'yō Line Local | Ube towards Iwakuni |
Location
- Location within Yamaguchi Prefecture Location within Japan

Onoda Station (小野田駅, Onoda-eki) is a passenger railway station located in the city of San'yō-Onoda, Yamaguchi Prefecture, Japan. It is operated by the West Japan Railway Company (JR West).

== Lines ==
Onoda Station is served by the JR West San'yō Main Line, and is located 488.0 kilometers from the terminus of the line at Kobe. It is also the terminus of the 11.6 kilometer Onoda Line to Ube-Shinkawa

== Station layout ==
The station consists of two ground-level island platforms connected by a footbridge. The station is staffed.

== Platforms ==
| 3 | ■ Onoda Line | for Suzumeda and Nagato-Motoyama |
| 4 | ■ San'yō Line | Shimonoseki |
| 5 | ■ San'yō Line | <not in service> |
| 6 | ■ San'yō Line | for Shin-Yamaguchi and Hōfu |

== History ==
Onoda Station was opened on 3 December 1900 on the San'yō Railway when the line was extended from Mitajiri Station (present-day Hōfu Station). The San'yō Railway was railway nationalized in 1906 and the line renamed the San'yō Main Line in 1909. With the privatization of the Japan National Railway (JNR) on 1 April 1987, the station came under the aegis of the West Japan Railway Company (JR West).

== Passenger statistics ==
In fiscal 2022, the station was used by an average of 1162 passengers daily.

== Surrounding area ==
- Sanyo Onoda City Hall
- Yamaguchi Prefectural Onoda High School
- Sanyo Onoda Municipal Takachiho Junior High School
- Sanyo Onoda Municipal Takachiho Elementary School

== See also ==
- List of railway stations in Japan
