= Nagato-Awano Station =

Railway station in Shimonoseki, Yamaguchi Prefecture, Japan

Nagato-Awano Station 長門粟野駅
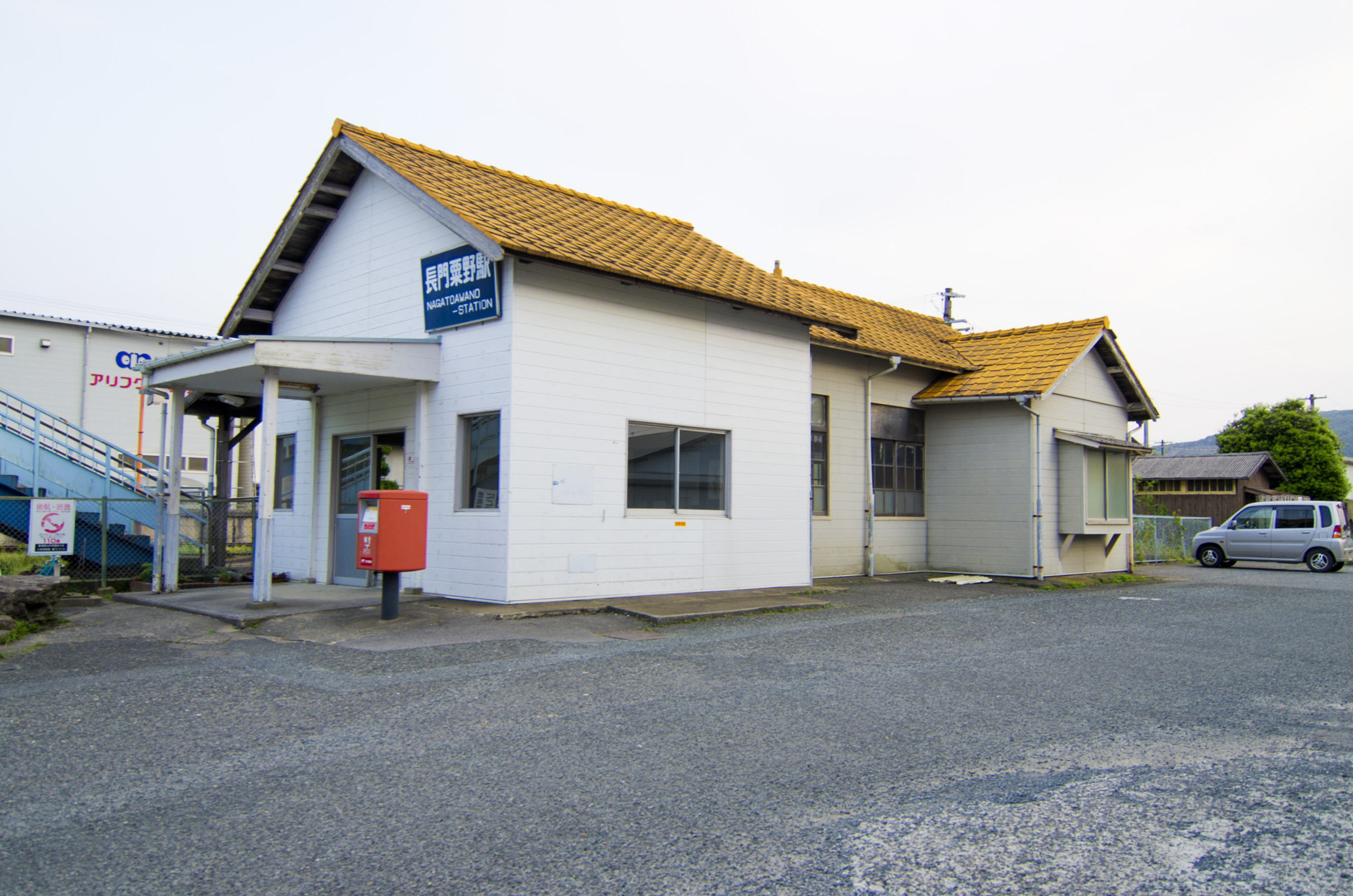
- Nagato-Awano Station, May 2012

General information
- Location: 4896 Awano, Hōhoku, Shimonoseki-shi, Yamaguchi-ken 759-5101; Japan
- Coordinates: 34°21′27″N 130°58′13″E
- Owner: West Japan Railway Company
- Operator: West Japan Railway Company
- Line: San'in Main Line
- Distance: 622.1 km (386.6 miles) from Kyoto
- Platforms: 2 side platforms
- Connections

Other information
- Status: Unstaffed
- Website: Official website

History
- Opened: 7 December 1930; 95 years ago

Passengers
- FY2020: 7 daily

Services
Preceding station	JR West	Following station
Agawa towards Shimonoseki	San'in Main Line E Local	Igami towards Masuda
Location
- Location within Yamaguchi Prefecture Location within Japan

Nagato-Awano Station (長門粟野駅, Nagato-Awano-eki) is a railway station on the Sanin Main Line located in the Hōhoku area of the city of Shimonoseki, Yamaguchi Prefecture, Japan. It is operated by the West Japan Railway Company (JR West).

== Lines ==
Nagato-Awano Station is served by the JR West San'in Main Line, and is located 622.1 kilometers from the terminus of the line at Kyoto.

== Station layout ==
The station consists of an island platform serving two tracks. The platform is accessible via an uncovered footbridge. There is a toilet available near the station building, which is located on the north side of the tracks. Though managed by the Nagato Railroad Bureau, there are no station staff members.

== History ==
- 7 December 1930 - The opening of the extension of the Mine Line, as it was then, from Nagato-Furuichi Station to Agawa Station. Services for passenger and freight trains commence.
- 24 February 1933 - Areas of the Mine line including Nagato-Awano Station are incorporated into the San'in Main Line.
- 1 June 1963 - The service of freight trains is cancelled.
- 1 April 1987 - Under the privatisation of Japan's railways, Nagato-Awano Station becomes part of the West Japan Railway Company.

== Platforms ==
Station side	■ San'in Main Line	for Igami, Hitomaru, Nagato-Furuichi, and Nagatoshi
Opposite side	■ San'in Main Line	for Agawa, Kottoi, Takibe and Shimonoseki

※The platforms are not numbered at this station.

== Passenger statistics ==
In fiscal 2020, the station was used by an average of 7 passengers daily.

== Surrounding area ==
There are several small shops around the station. The station is located in the village of Awano, which is at the north end of Shimonoseki city, and roughly 1 kilometre East from the border of Nagato city.

- Awano Port (Awano Fishing Harbour) - Former ferry port that linked to Kuzu in Yuya (of the former Ōtsu District)across the Yuya Bay.
- Awano Post Office
- Awano River - The aonori collected near the mouth of the river is a local speciality.
- Japan National Route 191

== See also ==
- List of railway stations in Japan
