= Nagato =

Nagato may refer to:

== Places ==
- Nagato-Awano Station, a railway station
- Nagato-Furuichi Station, a passenger railway station
- Nagato-Futami Station, a railway station
- Nagato-Misumi Station, a passenger railway station
- Nagato-Motoyama Station, a passenger railway station
- Nagato-Nagasawa Station, a passenger railway station
- Nagato-Ōi Station, a passenger railway station
- Nagato-Yumoto Station, a passenger railway station
- Nagato, Yamaguchi, a city in Yamaguchi prefecture, Japan
- Nagato, Nagano, a town in Nagano prefecture, Japan
- Nagato Province, one of the old provinces of Japan

== People with the surname ==
- Akaike Nagatō (赤池 長任; 1529–1568), Japanese samurai
- Ayumu Nagato (永藤 歩; born 1997), Japanese football player
- Chiaki Nagato (長戸 千晶; born 1987), Japanese businesswoman
- Daiko Nagato (長戸 大幸; born 1948), Japanese record producer, music arranger, writer and composer
- Fujibayashi Nagato-no-kami (藤林 長門守), Japanese samurai and ninja
- Fujiwara no Nagatō (藤原 長能; 949-1009?), Japanese poet and a court bureaucrat
- Hiroyuki Nagato (長門 裕之; 1934–2011), Japanese actor
- Masatsugu Nagato (長門 正貢; born 1948), Japanese businessman
- Isamu Nagato (長門 勇; 1932–2013), Japanese actor
- Katsuya Nagato (永戸 勝也; born 1995), Japanese professional footballer

Fictional characters:

- Yuki Nagato, a character in the Haruhi Suzumiya series
- Nagato or Pain (Naruto), an antagonist in the Naruto series

== Other uses ==
- Nagato Mint, a mint for the production of bronze coins
- Japanese battleship Nagato, a battleship of the Imperial Japanese Navy
- Nagato-class battleship, a pair of dreadnought battleships
- Kita-Nagato Kaigan Quasi-National Park, a Quasi-National Park on the coast of Yamaguchi Prefecture
