= Tsunoshima =

Island in Yamaguchi prefecture, Japan

Coordinates: 34°21′N 130°52′E

Native name: 角島
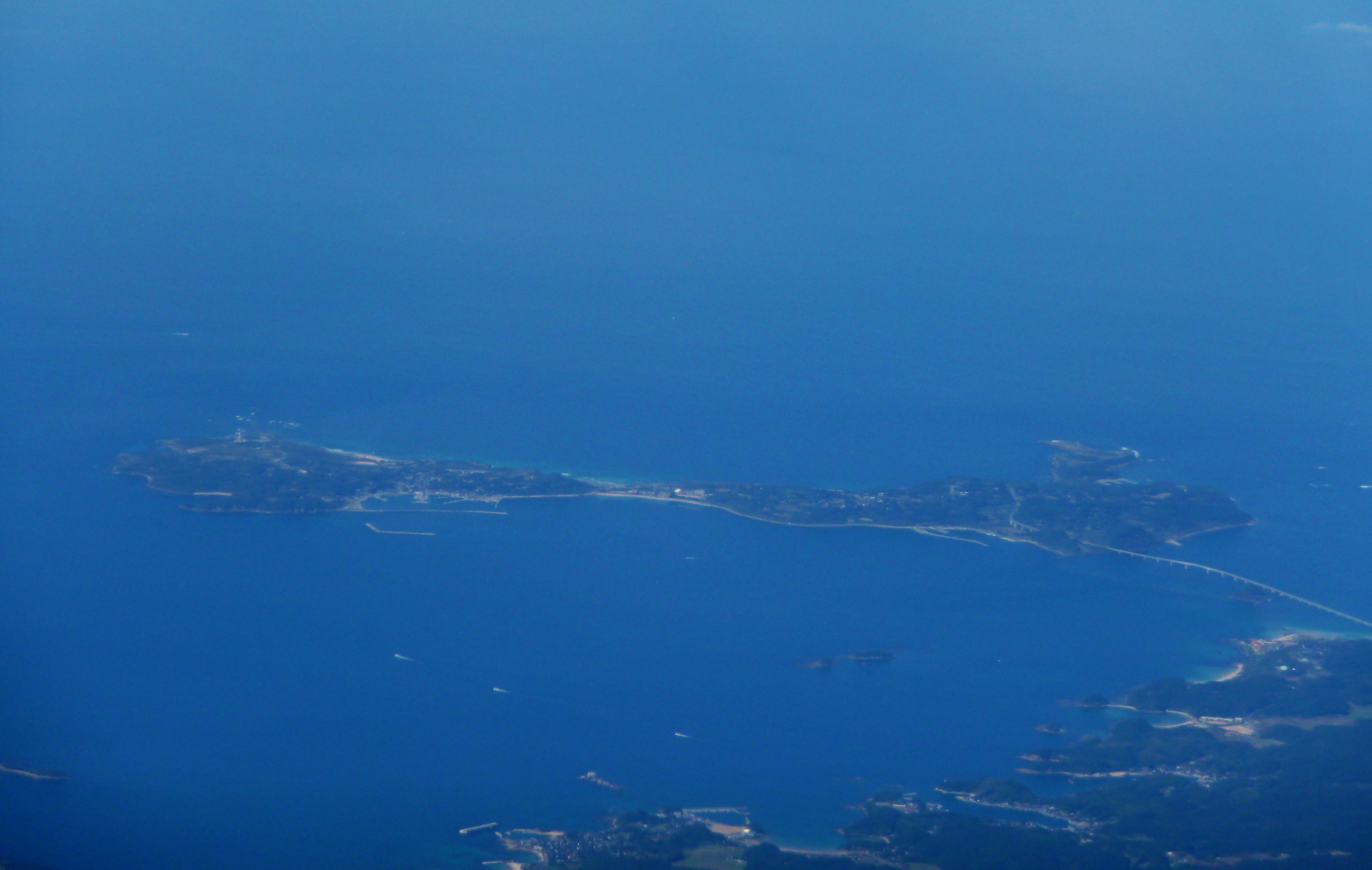
- Tsunoshima Island

- Location within Japan

Geography
- Location: Sea of Japan
- Area: 4.1 km^{2} (1.6 sq mi)
- Coastline: 17.1 km (10.63 mi)
- Highest elevation: 66 m (217 ft)

Administration
- Japan

Tsunoshima (角島) is an island located in the Sea of Japan. Located in the north west of Yamaguchi Prefecture, it is a part of Shimonoseki city. The island has an area of 4.1 square kilometers (1.6 sq mi) and has a coastline of 17.1 kilometres (10.6 mi). The island consists primarily of basalt, and is a part of the Kita-Nagato Kaigan Quasi-National Park. As of 28 August 2008, the population of Tsunoshima is 907.

== Geography ==
Once separated from Honshu, Tsunoshima is now accessible via the 1,780 metres (5,840 ft) long Tsunoshima Bridge, which was completed in the year 2000. At the time it was the longest toll free bridge in the country, though the completion of the Kouri Bridge in Okinawa prefecture pushed it into second place. On the north west of the island is the Tsunoshima Lighthouse, which has come to be the symbol of Tsunoshima. Before the war, Tsunoshima contained a military site of the former Imperial Japanese Army. To this day a part of this still remains.

The whale species Balaenoptera omurai (Omura's whale) was first identified here.

== History ==
Tsunoshima first appears in the written record in the Nara period (710 – 794). The name of the island appears on a mokkan wooden slip excavated at the site of the Heijō Palace in Nara. The mokkan is dated March 29, 746, and was attached to a tribute of seaweed to the imperial court. A reference to the island also appears in a poem in the sixteenth part of the Man'yōshū, the oldest existing collection of Japanese poetry, completed in 759. The Engishiki, a Japanese book of laws and regulations compiled in 927, refers to a ranch on the island, which was then part of Nagato Province. Over time the island was developed for agriculture, as well as supporting a fishing village.

In the Edo period (1603 – 1868) the island became part of the Chōfu Domain, but was transferred to the Chōshū Domain in 1718. After five years the island returned to the Chōfu Domain. The island was noted for the production of materials to make tatami matting, sesame seeds, and beef.

As a local administrative unit, under the 1889 municipal system Tsunoshima Village was a part of the Toyoura district and under a 1955 unification it became part of Hōhoku Town. In 2005, as the four towns which made up the Toyoura district (Hōhoku, Kikugawa, Toyoura and Toyota) merged with the city of Shimonoseki, Tsunoshima became a part of the city.

== Sightseeing areas ==
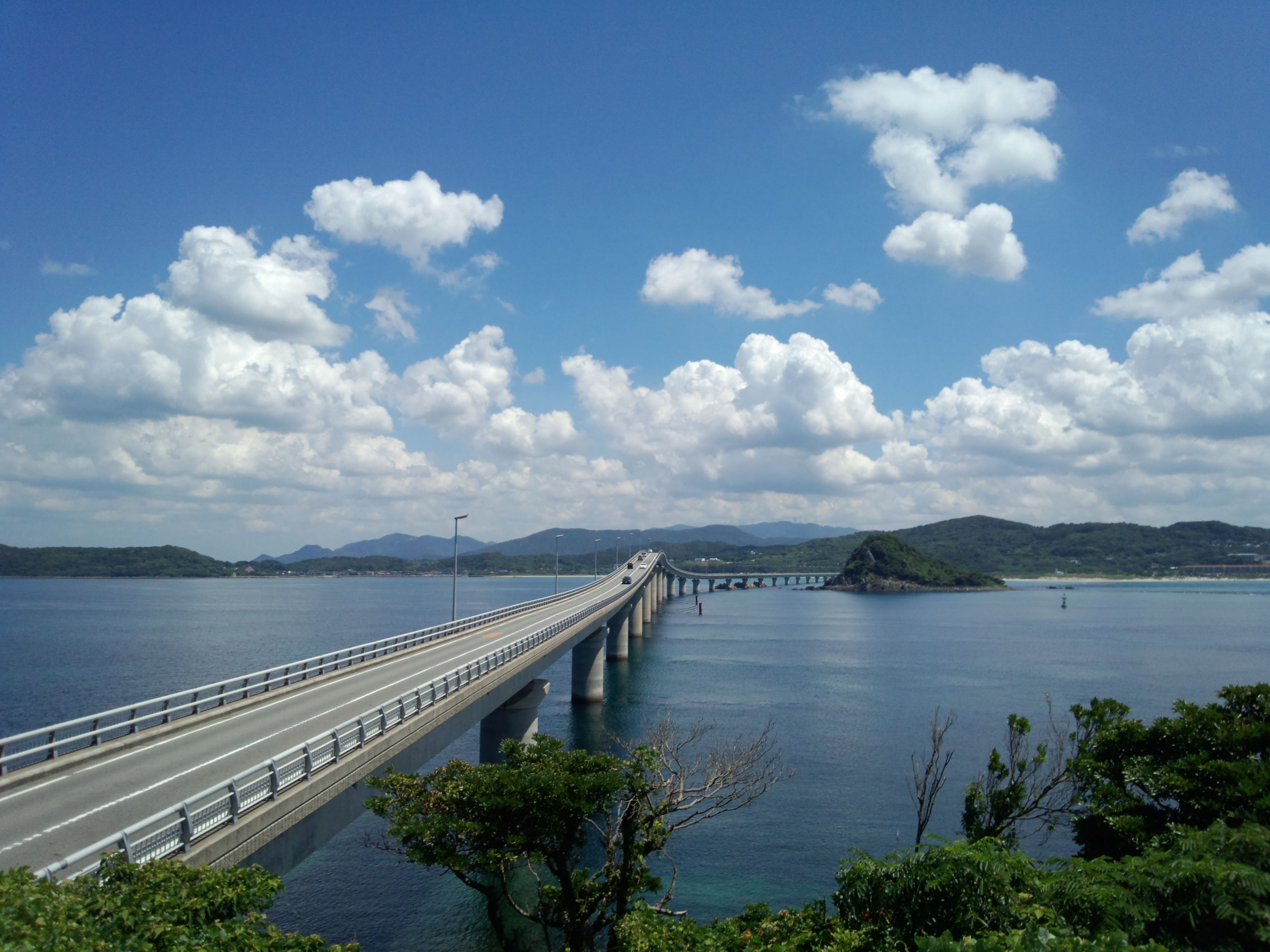
Tsunoshima Bridge(pictured from Tsunoshima)

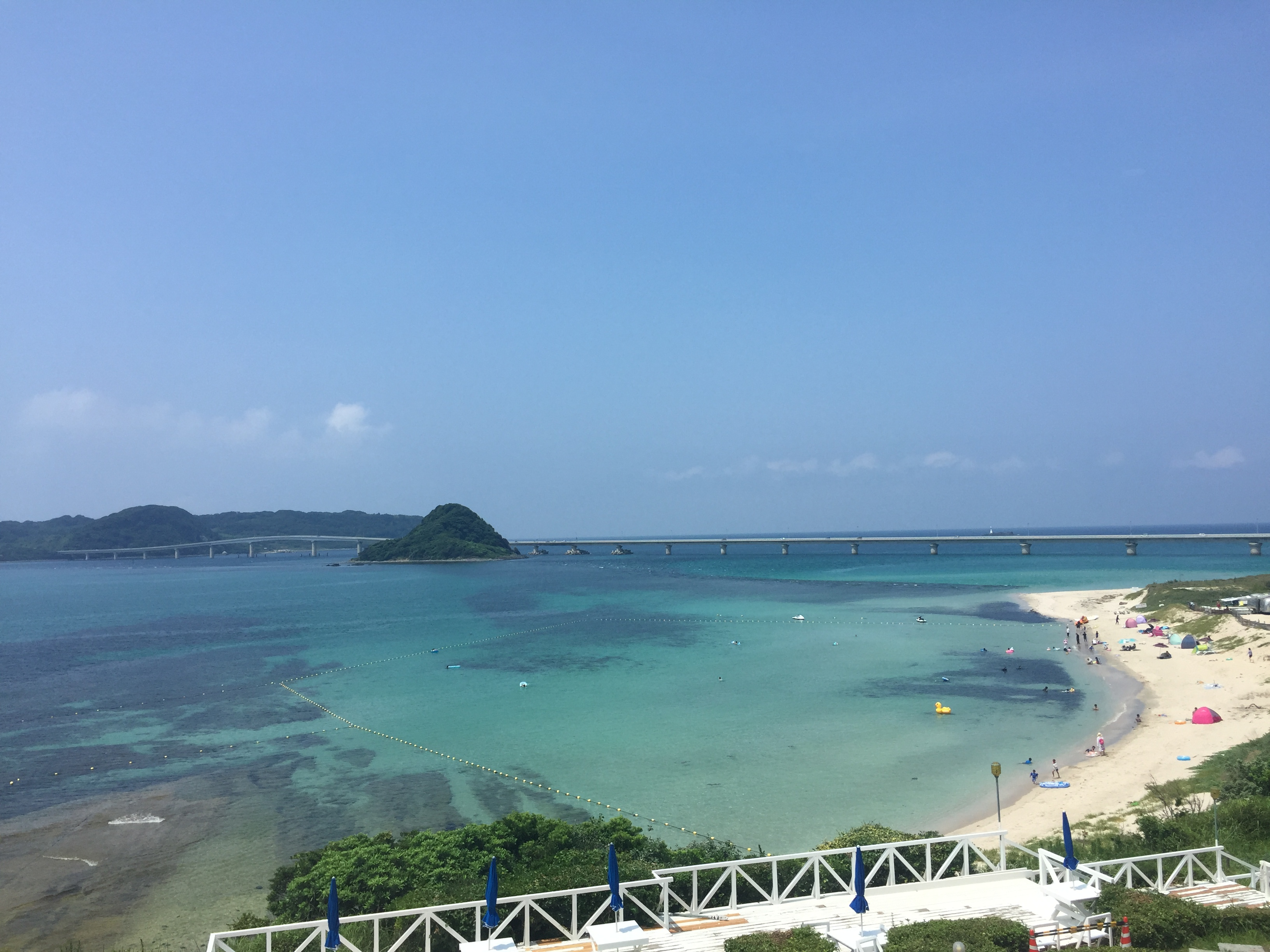
Tsunoshima Bridge seen from the beach

- Tsunoshima Lighthouse, built in 1876
- Tsunoshima Bridge
- Tsunoshima Nature Museum
- Tsunoshima Beach

Tsunoshima is home to many spider lily flowers. Following the opening of Tsunoshima Bridge, the area has frequently been used as a location for films and television shows. The 2005 movie Miracle in Four Days (四日間の奇跡 yokkakan no kiseki) was set across almost the entire island. In 2006, Tsunoshima became the location for a special episode of Fuji Television's popular drama, Hero.

The island is also a popular are for camping and sport fishing.

== Access ==
From National Route 191 turn onto Yamaguchi Route 275 towards Shimado, then turn onto Yamaguchi Route 276, crossing the Tsunoshima Bridge.

Tsunoshima is serviced by a bus which is available from Kottoi Station and Takibe Station, both of which are located on the San'in Main Line.
