= Nagato-Futami Station =

Railway station in Shimonoseki, Yamaguchi Prefecture, Japan

Nagato-Futami Station 長門二見駅
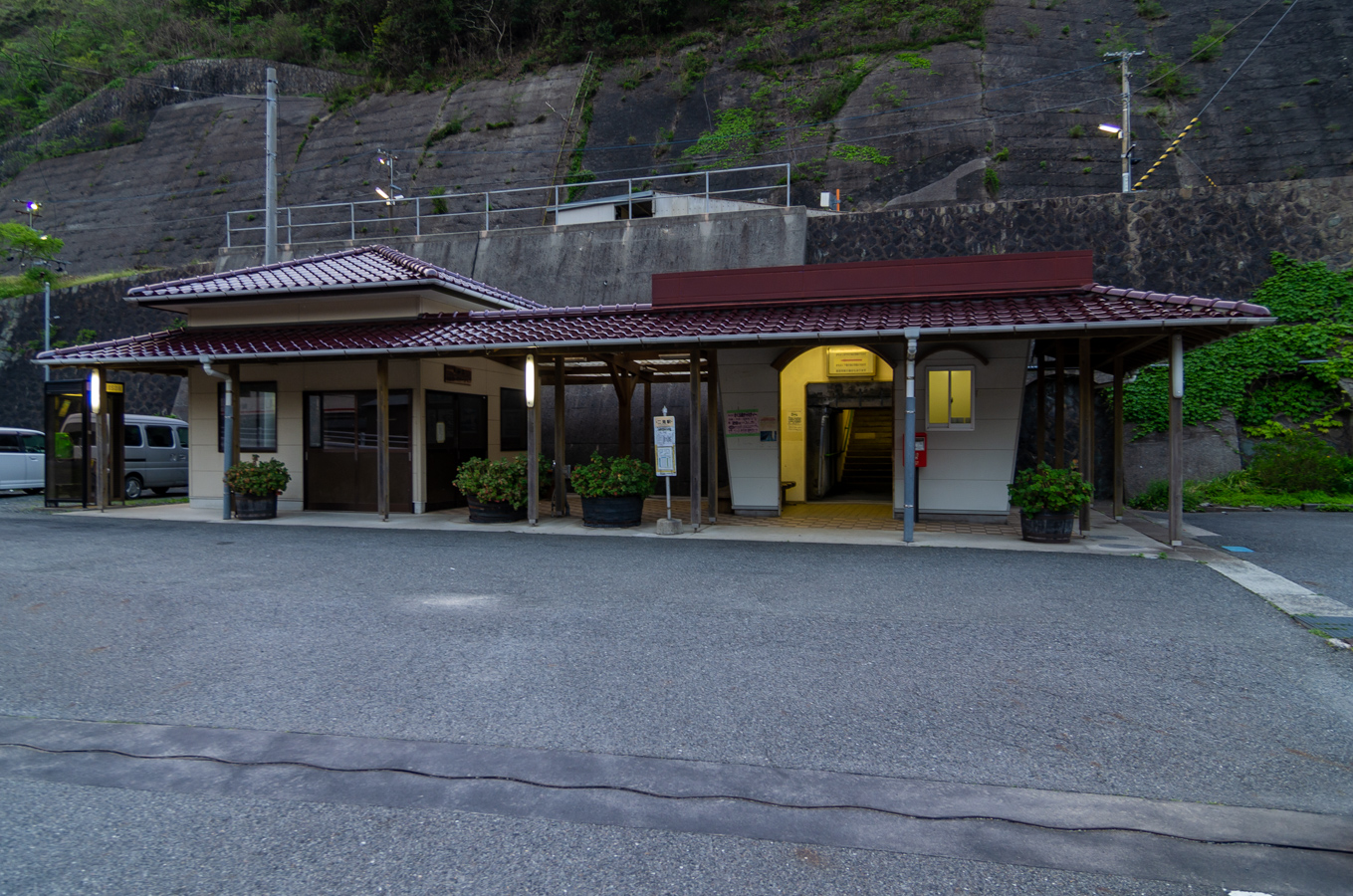
- Nagato-Futami Station, May 2012

General information
- Location: 7273-6, Hohoku-cho Kandakami Kamifutami, Shimonoseki-shi, Yamaguchi-ken 759-5513; Japan
- Coordinates: 34°15′06″N 130°54′54″E
- Owner: West Japan Railway Company
- Operator: West Japan Railway Company
- Line: San'in Main Line
- Distance: 639.9 km (397.6 miles) from Kyoto
- Platforms: 1 island platform
- Connections: Bus stop

Other information
- Status: Unstaffed
- Website: Official website

History
- Opened: 16 August 1925; 101 years ago

Passengers
- FY 2020: 14 daily

Services
Preceding station	JR West	Following station
Ukahongō towards Shimonoseki	San'in Main Line E Local	Takibe towards Masuda
Location
- Location within Yamaguchi Prefecture Location within Japan

Nagato-Futami Station (長門二見駅, Nagato-Futami-eki) is a railway station located in the Hōhoku area of the city of Shimonoseki, Yamaguchi Prefecture, Japan. It is operated by the West Japan Railway Company (JR West).

== Lines ==
Nagato-Futami Station is served by the JR West San'in Main Line, and is located 639.9 kilometers from the terminus of the line at Kyoto.

== Station layout ==
The station consists of an island platform serving two tracks, enabling passengers to change trains. Though managed by the Nagato Railroad Bureau, there are no station staff members nor an automated ticket facility. The platform is halfway up a mountainside cliff, which is accessible via a stairway in a tunnel from the station building. There was a waiting room on the platform, though it was destroyed in a fire in 2000.

The construction of the San'in Main Line was the final link in connecting the trainlines in the area during the Taishō period. At the time, the plan was to have the entire line along the Sea of Japan coastline, but in line with the wishes of the region's residents as well as to keep the project in budget, Takibe Station and Kottoi Station were located inland. Owing to this layout, the tracks leading to Nagato-Futami Station include curves of nearly 90 degrees.

== Platforms ==
Mountain side	■ San'in Main Line	for Takibe, Kottoi, Agawa and Nagatoshi
Ocean side	■ San'in Main Line	for Ukahongō, Yutama, Kogushi and Shimonoseki

※The platforms are not numbered at this station.

== History ==
- 16 August 1925 - The extension of the Japanese National Rail Kogushi Line, as it was then known, from Kogushi Station to Takibe Station is completed. Nagato-Futama Station begins servicing passenger as well as freight trains.
- 24 February 1933 - The Kogushi Line is incorporated into the San'in Main Line.
- 1 August 1961 - Freight train service cancelled.
- 1 April 1987 - Under the privatisation of Japan's railways, Takibe Station becomes part of the West Japan Railway Company.
- 7 August 2010 - A fire burns down the platform waiting room.

== Passenger statistics ==
In fiscal 2020, the station was used by an average of 14 passengers daily.

== Surrounding area ==
There are a few small shops around the station. Between Nagato-Futami Station and Kogushi Station it is possible to have a clear view of the Sea of Japan along the coastline.

- Futami Post Office
- Futami Fishing Harbour
- Futami Elementary School
- Meoto Iwa
- Tokiwaya (makers of Futami Manjū)
- Kōrin Temple
- Japan National Route 191

=== Bus line ===
- Blue Line Bus Service

== See also ==
- List of railway stations in Japan
