= Agawa Station =

Railway station in Shimonoseki, Yamaguchi Prefecture, Japan

Agawa Station 阿川駅
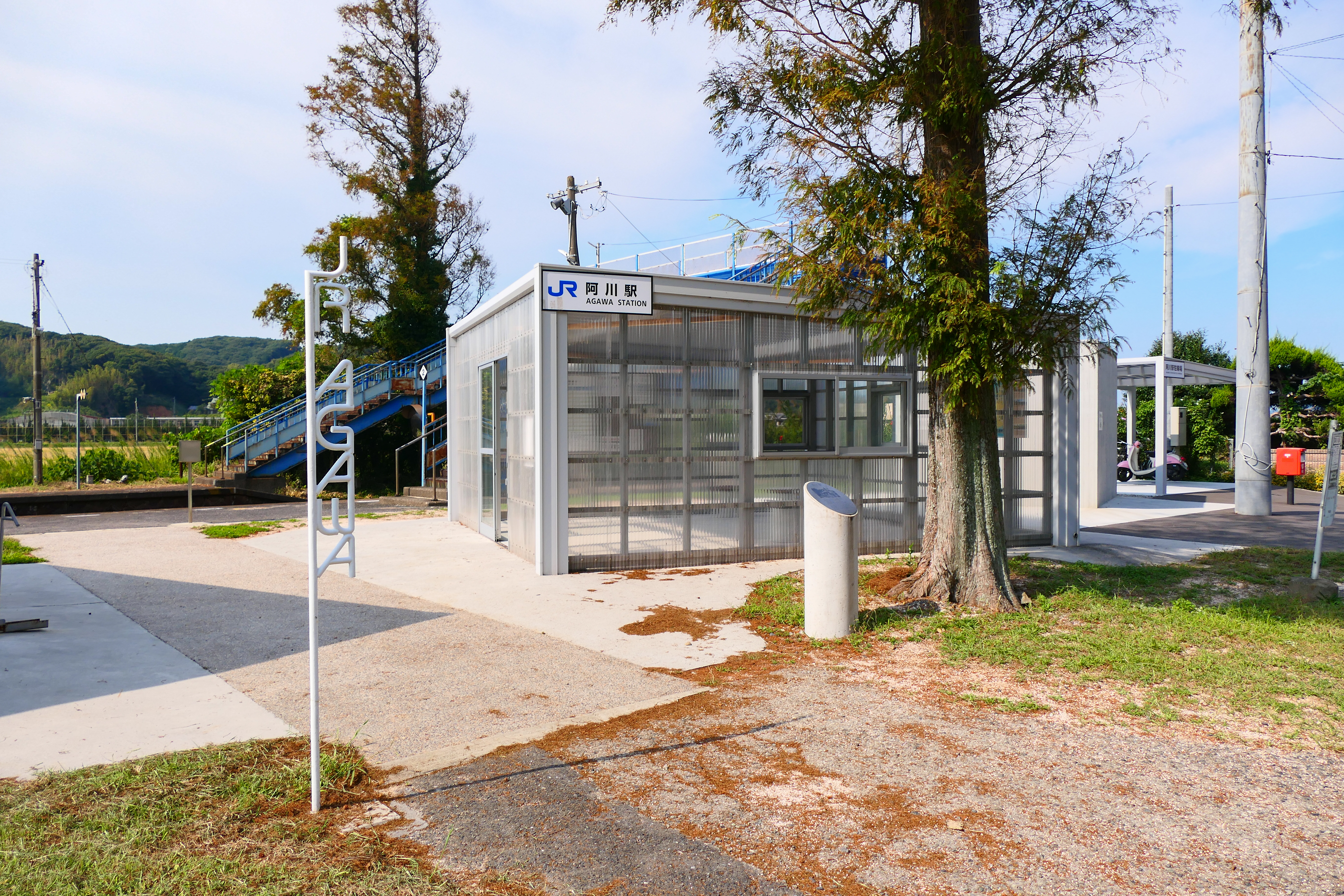
- Agawa Station in October 2022

General information
- Location: 3653-3 Agawa Mizutori, Hōhoku, Shimonoseki-shi, Yamaguchi-ken 759-5241; Japan
- Coordinates: 34°20′09″N 130°55′33″E
- Owner: West Japan Railway Company
- Operator: West Japan Railway Company
- Line: San'in Main Line
- Distance: 627.4 km (389.8 miles) from Kyoto
- Platforms: 2 side platforms
- Connections: Bus stop

Other information
- Status: Unstaffed
- Website: Official website

History
- Opened: 9 September 1928; 98 years ago

Passengers
- 2020: 29 daily

Services
Preceding station	JR West	Following station
Kottoi towards Shimonoseki	San'in Main Line E Local	Nagato-Awano towards Masuda
Location
- Location within Yamaguchi Prefecture Location within Japan

Agawa Station (阿川駅, Agawa-eki) is a JR West San'in Main Line railway station located in the Hōhoku area of the city of Shimonoseki, Yamaguchi Prefecture, Japan. It is operated by the West Japan Railway Company (JR West). It was one of the stations on the Misuzu Shiosai train, which ran between Nagatoshi and Hatabu.

== Lines ==
Agawa Station is served by the JR West San'in Main Line, and is located 627.4 kilometers from the terminus of the line at Kyoto.

== Station Layout ==
The station has two side platforms, serving two tracks, enabling passengers to change trains via a footbridge. The station building had retained its traditional wooden structure for many years, but was replaced in 2020 with a modern steel and glass building The station is run by the Nagato Railroad Bureau. Agawa Station is a Kan'i itaku station. Though there are no staff members, standard tickets can be purchased from a small shop a short distance from the station.

== Platforms ==
1	■ San'in Main Line	for Nagato-Awano, Igami, Hitomaru, and Nagatoshi
2	■ San'in Main Line	for Kottoi, Takibe, Nagato-Futami, and Shimonoseki

== History ==
- 9 September 1928 - The extension of the Japanese National Rail Kogushi Line, as it was then known, from Takibe Station, is completed. Agawa Station became the new final stop and began servicing customer as well as freight trains.
- 7 December 1930 - The extension of the Mine Line, as it was then known, from Nagato-Furuichi Station is completed. Agawa Station becomes the border point between the Mine Line and the Kogushi Line.
- 24 February 1933 - The Kogushi Line and Mine Line are incorporated into the San'in Main Line.
- 1 June 1963 - The service of freight trains is cancelled.
- 1 April 1987 - Under the privatisation of Japan's railways, Agawa Station becomes part of the West Japan Railway Company.

== Passenger statistics ==
In fiscal 2020, the station was used by an average of 29 passengers daily.

== Surrounding area ==
- Agawa Beach
- The Agawamōri Family Graveyard
- Agawa Post Office
- Japan National Route 191
- Okitagawa

== See also ==
- List of railway stations in Japan
