= Igami Station =

Railway station in Nagato, Yamaguchi Prefecture, Japan

Igami Station 伊上駅
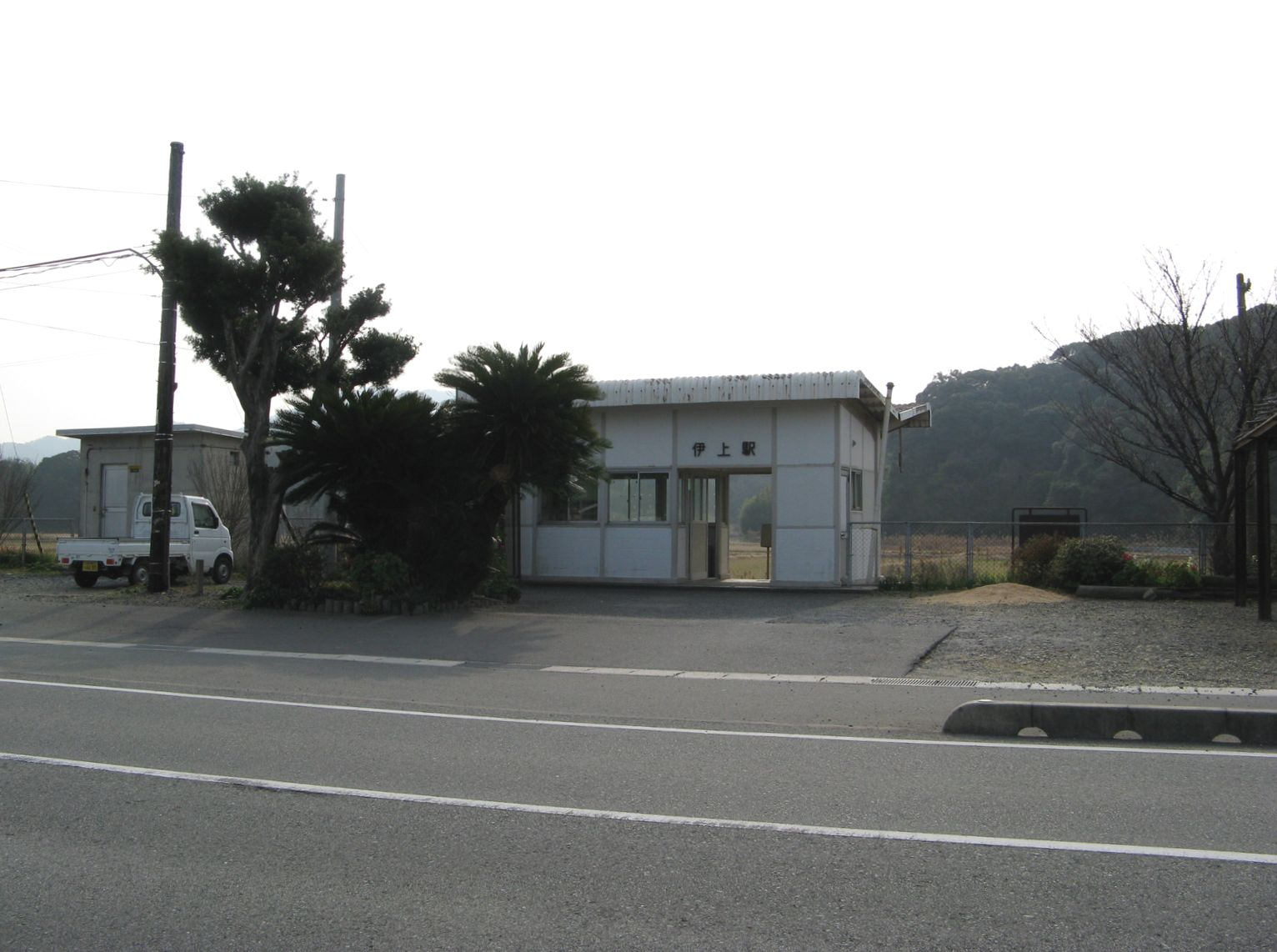
- Igami Station in January 2008

General information
- Location: 2842-2Yuya Igami Nishimae, Nagato-shi, Yamaguchi-ken 759-4505; Japan
- Coordinates: 34°22′13.59″N 131°0′40.62″E
- Owner: West Japan Railway Company
- Operator: West Japan Railway Company
- Line: San'in Main Line
- Distance: 617.9 km (383.9 miles) from Kyoto
- Platforms: 1 side platform
- Tracks: 1
- Connections: Bus stop

Other information
- Status: Staffed
- Website: Official website

History
- Opened: 7 December 1930; 95 years ago

Passengers
- FY2020: 7

Services
Preceding station	JR West	Following station
Nagato-Awano towards Shimonoseki	San'in Main Line E Local	Hitomaru towards Masuda
Location
- Location within Yamaguchi Prefecture Location within Japan

Igami Station (伊上駅, Igami-eki) is a passenger railway station located in the city of Nagato, Yamaguchi Prefecture, Japan. It is operated by the West Japan Railway Company (JR West).

== Lines ==
Igami Station is served by the JR West San'in Main Line, and is located 617.9 kilometers from the terminus of the line at Kyoto. Only local trains stop at this station.

== Station layout ==
The station consists of one side platform with the station building on the right side when facing in the direction of Ogushi Station. The station is unattended.

== History ==
Igami Station was opened on 7 December 1930 as an intermediate station of the Japan Government Railways Mine Line when the line was extended from Nagato-Furuichi Station to Agawa Station. This portion of the Mine Line was incorporated into the San'in Main Line on 24 February 1933. Freight operations were discontinued on 1 August 1961. With the privatization of the Japan National Railway (JNR) on 1 April 1987, the station came under the aegis of the West Japan railway Company (JR West).

== Passenger statistics ==
In fiscal 2020, the station was used by an average of 7 passengers daily.

== Surrounding area ==
- Japan National Route 191
- Nagato Municipal Inoue Elementary School
- Yuya Bay

== See also ==
- List of railway stations in Japan
