= Yutama Station =

Railway station in Shimonoseki, Yamaguchi Prefecture, Japan

Yutama Station 湯玉駅
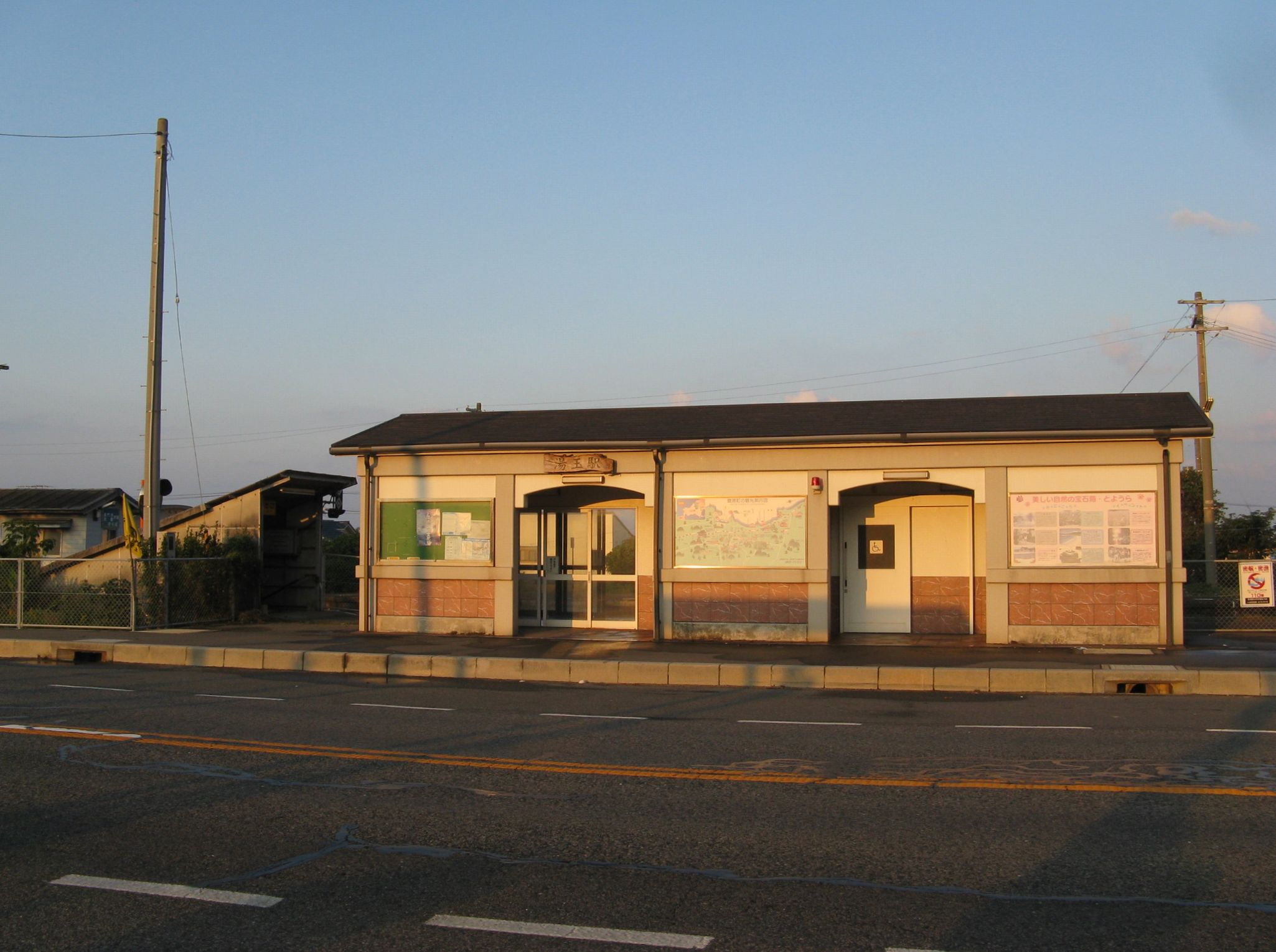
- Yasuoka Station in October 2009

General information
- Location: 7441, Toyoura-cho Uka Yutama, Shimonoseki-shi, Yamaguchi-ken 759-6303; Japan
- Coordinates: 34°12′32.62″N 130°55′56.68″E
- Owner: West Japan Railway Company
- Operator: West Japan Railway Company
- Line: San'in Main Line
- Distance: 645.7 km (401.2 miles) from Kyoto
- Platforms: 2 side platforms
- Tracks: 2
- Connections: Bus stop

Other information
- Status: Unstaffed
- Website: Official website

History
- Opened: 16 August 1925; 101 years ago

Passengers
- FY2020: 25

Services
Preceding station	JR West	Following station
Kogushi towards Shimonoseki	San'in Main Line E Local	Ukahongō towards Masuda
Location
- Location within Yamaguchi Prefecture Location within Japan

Yutama Station (湯玉駅, Yutama-eki) is a passenger railway station located in the city of Shimonoseki, Yamaguchi Prefecture, Japan. It is operated by the West Japan Railway Company (JR West).

== Lines ==
Yutama Station is served by the JR West San'in Main Line, and is located 645.7 kilometers from the terminus of the line at Kyoto.

== Station layout ==
The station consists of two unnumbered ground-level opposed side platforms connected to the station building by an underground passageway. The station is unattended.

== Platforms ==
Ocean side	■ San'in Main Line	for Takibe and Nagatoshi
Mountain side	■ San'in Main Line	for Kogushi and Shimonoseki

== History ==
Yutama Station was opened on 16 August 1925. With the privatization of the Japan National Railway (JNR) on 1 April 1987, the station came under the aegis of the West Japan railway Company (JR West).

== Passenger statistics ==
In fiscal 2020, the station was used by an average of 25 passengers daily.

== Surrounding area ==
- Shimonoseki City Hall Toyoura General Branch Uga Branch
- Cape Inunaki
- Japan National Route 191

== See also ==
- List of railway stations in Japan
