= Tagami Kikusha =

- 田上菊舎
- Born: Michi; November 3, 1753; Tasuki, Toyoura District, Nagato Province
- Died: August 23, 1826 (aged 72)
- Occupation: Literata
- Relatives: Taka and Tagami Yoshinaga
- Writing career
- Period: Early Modern
- Genre: Haiku poetry

Tagami Kikusha (田上菊舎; 3 Nov 1753–23 Aug 1826 [ Hōreki 3.10.14 – Bunsei 9.8.23]) was a Japanese Early Modern literata (bunjin). Best known for her haiku poetry, she also wrote verse in Chinese, and was accomplished in the tea ceremony, koto, and ink painting.

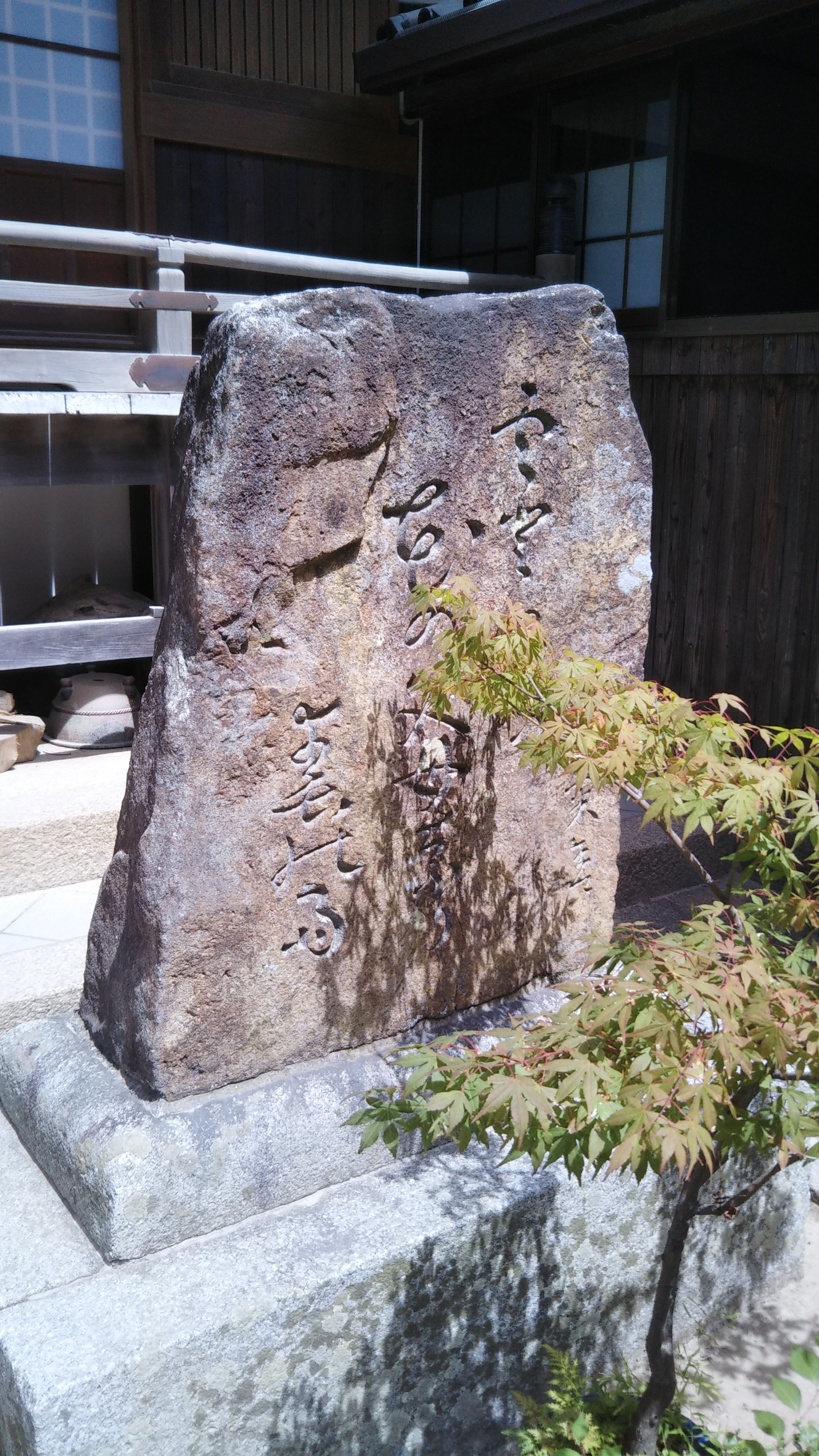
The stone engraved with Kikusha Tagami's haiku in Tokuouji, Chofu.

== Biography ==
She was born in the village of Tasuki, Toyoura District, Nagato Province (in modern Hôhoku, Yamaguchi Prefecture). Her mother was named Taka; her father was Tagami Yoshinaga, a doctor. Her birth name was Michi. In 1768, because her father inherited the position of head of household, she moved with her family to Innaichô, Chôfu, Shimonoseki. Her father became a retainer of the Chôfu domain, and changed his name to Honjô Ryôsa. In the same year, when she was 16 years old, she married Murata Rinosuke, who came from a farming family in her village. However, Rinosuke died in 1776. They had no children. As a result, when she was 24, she returned to her natal household and was reinstated in her natal family registry.

She began to study haikai first as a disciple of Chôfu haikai poet Goseian Shizan, receiving from him the poetic name Kikusha (originally written 菊車 but later changed to 菊舎). In 1781 [Tenmei 1], at the age of 29, she decided to retrace the journeys of Matsuo Bashô (1644-1694) and Jôdo Shinshû sect founder Shinran (1173-1263). After setting out from Chôfu, she first visited Yahata Hitomaru Shrine in the Ôtsu district (modern Yuya, Nagato, Yamaguchi Prefecture) to pray for artistic prowess. She took the tonsure at Seikôji, a Jôdo Shinshû temple in Hagi with ties to Hongan-ji, receiving the Buddhist name Myôi 妙意; she then began a solitary journey to deepen her understanding of haikai poetry.

Kikusha then traveled to Kyoto and Osaka, and thence to Mino Province (modern Gifu Prefecture) where she visited Mino School haikai master Chôboen Sankyô and became his disciple. Afterwards, following the course of Bashô's Oku no hosomichi (Narrow road to the interior, Narrow road to the north) journey in reverse, she traveled through the regions of Hokuriku, Shinano, and Michinoku until she reached Edo (modern Tokyo). She remained there for four years, finally concluding her trip by returning to Chôfu in 1784 (Tenmei 4). Afterwards, Kikusha continued to travel frequently to places as distant as Kyûshû, becoming one of the Edo period's most celebrated female travelers. Her reputation initially rested on her haikai poetry, but afterwards she extended her reach into other artistic fields, including calligraphy, painting, the seven-string koto, tea ceremony, waka poetry, and kanshi.
