= Hamagōchi Station =

Railway station in San'yō-Onoda, Yamaguchi Prefecture, Japan

Hamagōchi Station 浜河内駅
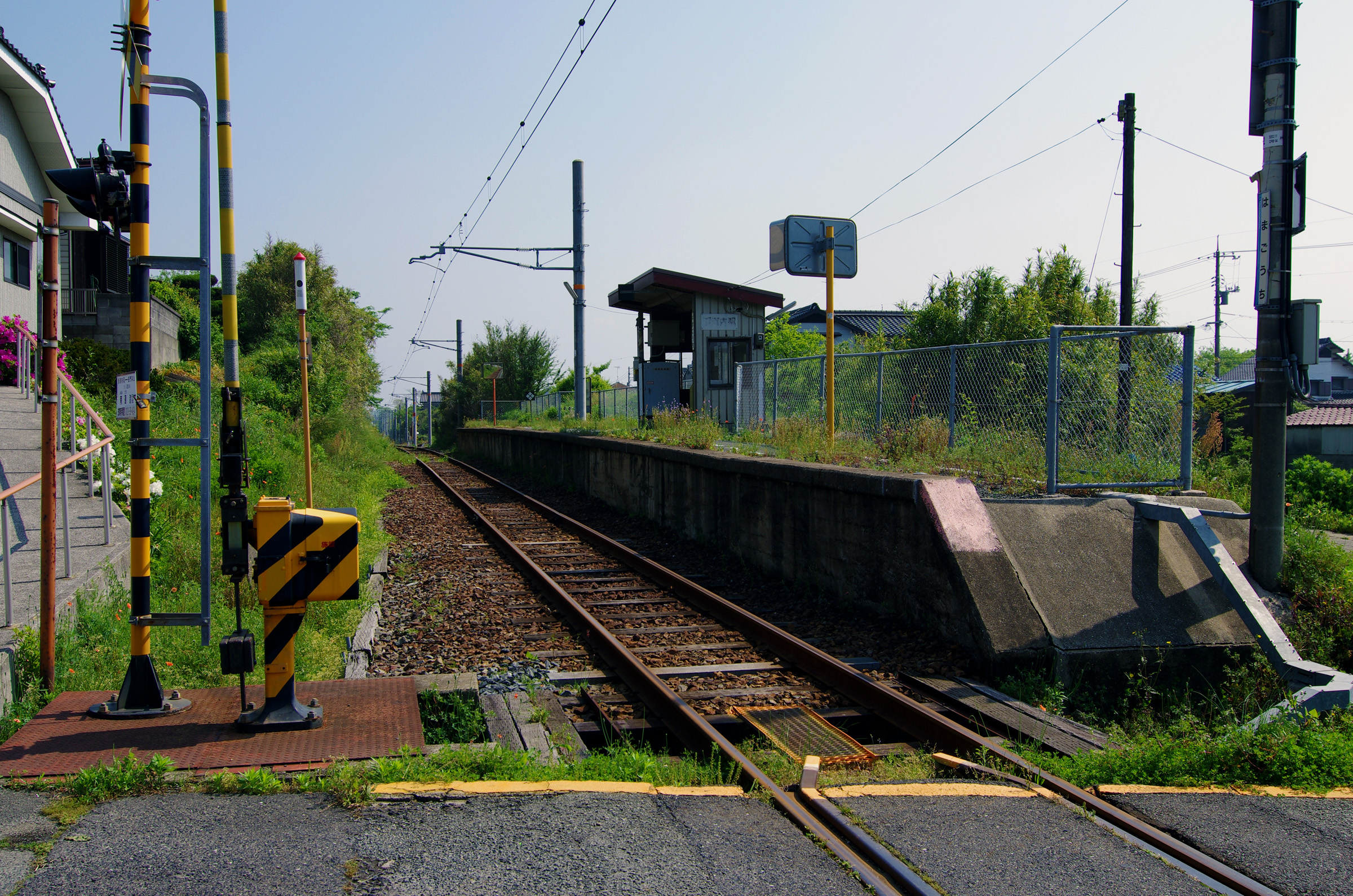
- Hamagōchi Station in May 2012

General information
- Location: Onoda Natsume, San'yō-Onoda-shi, Yamaguchi-ken 756-0872; Japan
- Coordinates: 33°57′1.39″N 131°10′46.12″E
- Owner: West Japan Railway Company
- Operator: West Japan Railway Company
- Line: Onoda Line
- Distance: 1.3 km (0.81 mi) from Suzumeda
- Platforms: 1 side platform
- Tracks: 1
- Connections: Bus stop

Construction
- Structure type: at grade

Other information
- Status: Unstaffed
- Website: Official website

History
- Opened: June 1, 1957

Passengers
- FY2020: 7

Services
Preceding station	JR West	Following station
Suzumeda towards Ube-Shinkawa	Onoda Line (Motoyama Branch)	Nagato-Motoyama Terminus
Location
- Location within Yamaguchi Prefecture Location within Japan

Hamagōchi Station (浜河内駅, Hamagōchi-eki) is a passenger railway station located in the city of San'yō-Onoda, Yamaguchi Prefecture, Japan. It is operated by the West Japan Railway Company (JR West).

== Lines ==
Hamagōchi Station is served by the JR West Onoda Line branch line, and is located 1.3 kilometers from the junction with the main line at Suzumeda.

== Station layout ==
The station consists of one ground level unnumbered side platform serving a single bi-directional track. There is no station building, but only a small shelter on the platform, and the station is unattended.

== History ==
Hamagōchi Station was opened on 1 June 1957 when the Onoda Line branch line to Nagato-Motoyama was opened. With the privatization of the Japan National Railway (JNR) on 1 April 1987, the station came under the aegis of the West Japan railway Company (JR West).

== Passenger statistics ==
In fiscal 2020, the station was used by an average of 7 passengers daily.

== Surrounding area ==
The surrounding area is a village dotted with private houses and fields, and there are no large-scale commercial facilities. In front of the station is the Hamakochi Community Hall.

== See also ==
- List of railway stations in Japan
