= Tsunoshima Lighthouse =

Lighthouse in Shimonoseki, Japan

Tsunoshima Lighthouse Tsunoshima Tōdai 角島灯台
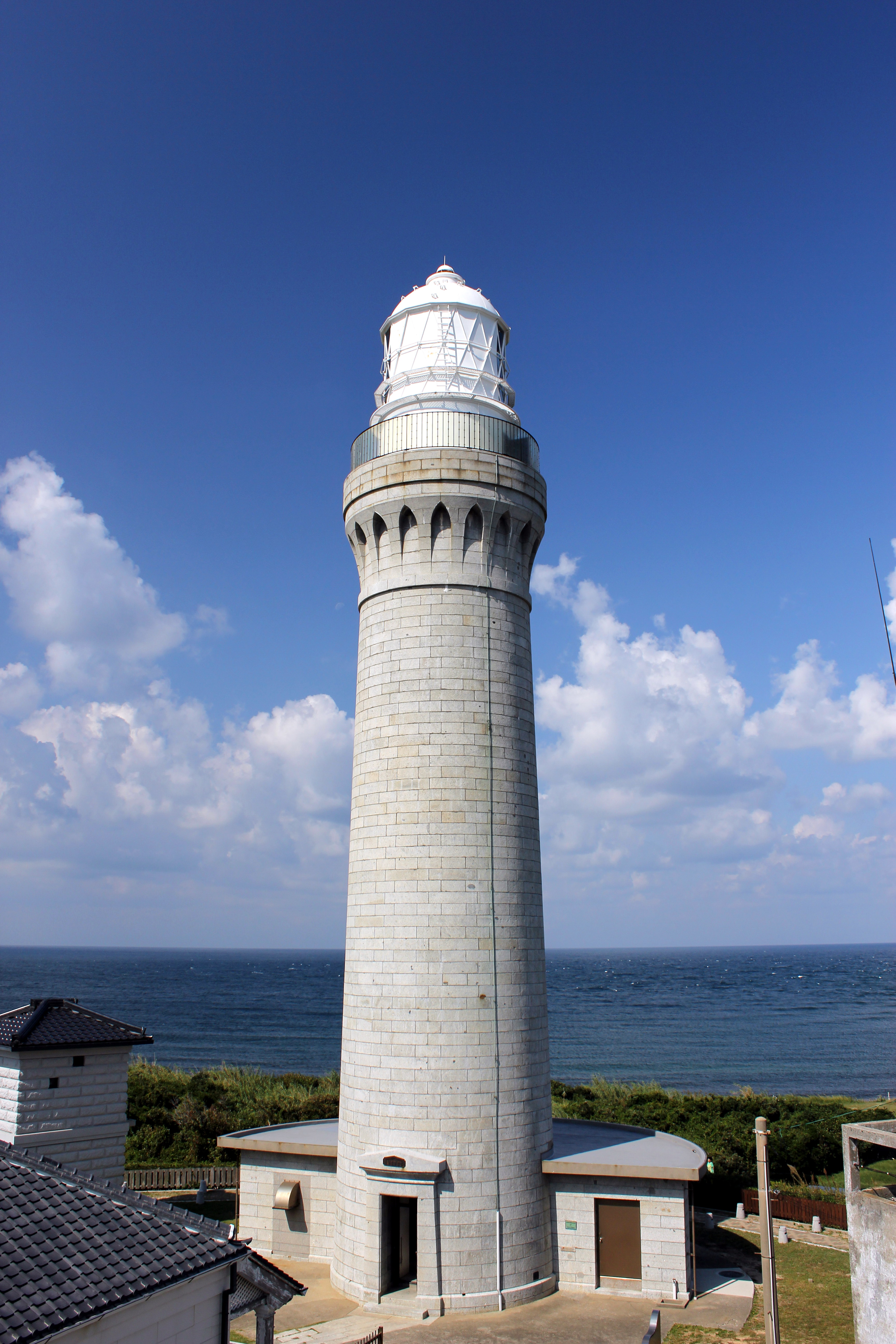
- Tsunoshima Lighthouse
- Location: Tsunoshima; Shimonoseki, Yamaguchi; Japan
- Coordinates: 34°21′08.9″N 130°50′27.7″E

Tower
- Constructed: March 1, 1876
- Construction: granite tower
- Height: 29.62 metres (97.2 ft)
- Shape: cylindrical tower with balcony and lantern
- Markings: unpainted tower, white lantern

Light
- Focal height: 44.66 metres (146.5 ft)
- Lens: First order Fresnel
- Intensity: 670,000 Candela; 1,400,00 cd
- Range: 18.5 nautical miles (34.3 km; 21.3 mi)
- Characteristic: Fl. W 5s
- Japan no.: JCG-0715

Tsunoshima Lighthouse (角島灯台, tsunoshima tōdai) is a lighthouse on the island of Tsunoshima in the city of Shimonoseki, Yamaguchi Prefecture, Japan. It is notable as being one of only six lighthouses in Japan which had a first order Fresnel lens, the most powerful type of Fresnel lens.

== History ==
Work began in August 1873. The lighthouse was first lit on March 1, 1876, in the Meiji period of Japan. It was one of the lighthouses designed by Richard Henry Brunton, who was hired by the government of Japan to help construct lighthouses to make coastal waters safe for foreign ships to approach, after Japan opened up to the West.

== Access ==
The lighthouse is open to the public. It is accessible by car, bicycle, or public transportation; specifically by bus from Kottoi Station.

== See also ==
- List of lighthouses in Japan
