= Takibe Station =

Railway station in Shimonoseki, Yamaguchi Prefecture, Japan

Takibe Station 滝部駅
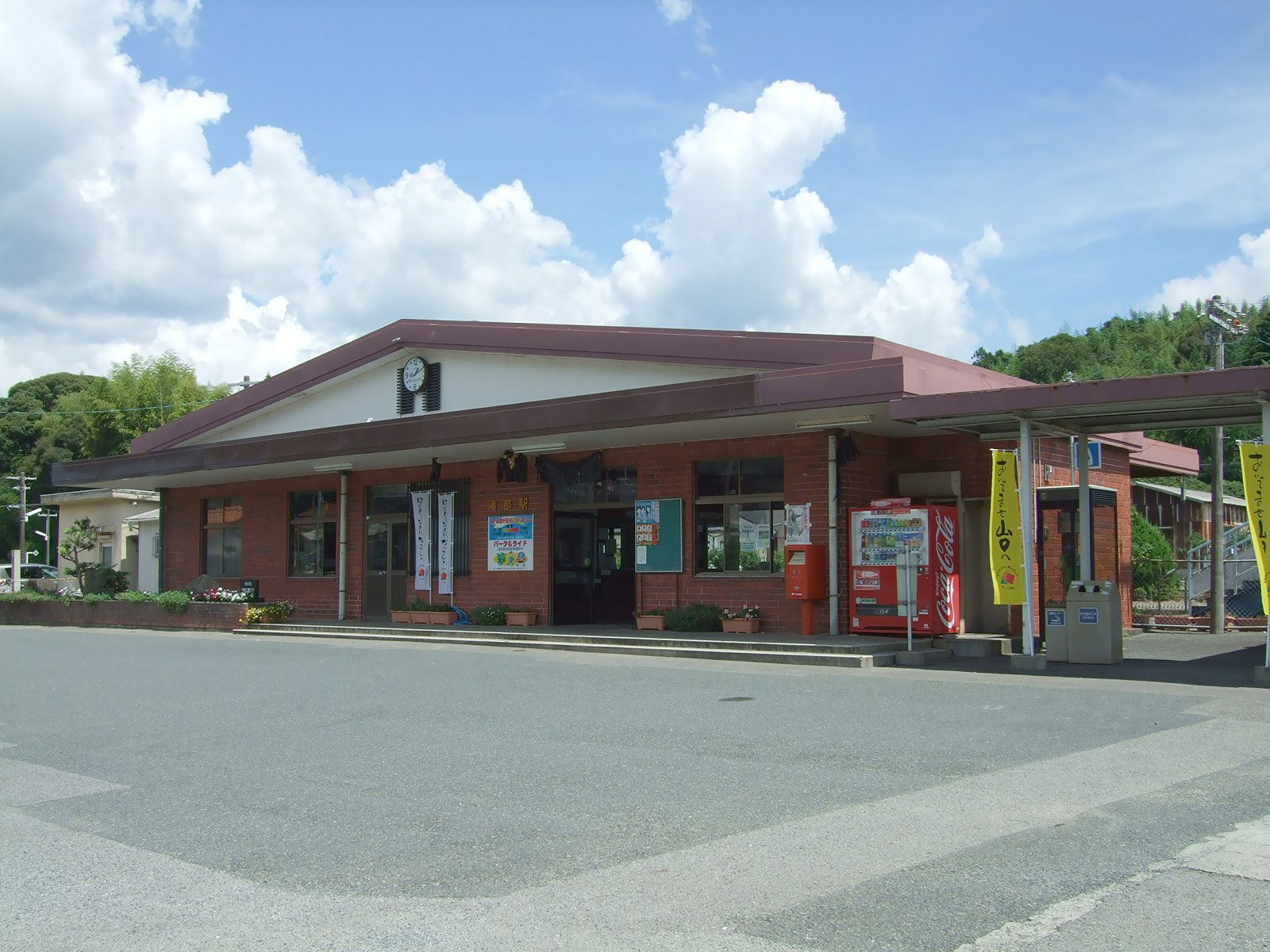
- Takibe Station in August 2008

General information
- Location: 452 Takibe Moritomo, Hōhoku, Shimonoseki-shi, Yamaguchi-ken 759-5511; Japan
- Coordinates: 34°17′03″N 130°56′48″E
- Owner: West Japan Railway Company
- Operator: West Japan Railway Company
- Line: San'in Main Line
- Distance: 635.1 km (394.6 miles) from Kyoto
- Platforms: 1 side + 1 island platform
- Connections: Bus stop

Other information
- Status: Staffed
- Website: Official website

History
- Opened: 16 August 1925; 101 years ago

Passengers
- FY 2020: 202 daily

Services
Preceding station	JR West	Following station
Nagato-Futami towards Shimonoseki	San'in Main Line E Local	Kottoi towards Masuda
Location
- Location within Yamaguchi Prefecture Location within Japan

Takibe Station (滝部駅, Takibe-eki) is a railway station located in the Hōhoku area of the city of Shimonoseki, Yamaguchi Prefecture, Japan. It is operated by the West Japan Railway Company (JR West). It is one of the stations on the Misuzu Shiosai Experience, which takes place on certain trains during the day between Nagatoshi and Hatabu.

== Lines ==
Takibe Station is served by the JR West San'in Main Line, and is located 635.1 kilometers from the terminus of the line at Kyoto.

== Station layout ==
The station was originally designed as a single entry station capable of serving three tracks across one side platform and one island platform; however the third track was withdrawn and separated from the mainline, leaving just the two tracks. For that reason, the station layout was set so that trains travelling in each direction would stop at their respective platforms. The entrance to the station's building is on platform 1, while access to platform 2 can be made via an uncovered footbridge. There is a waiting room on each platform.

The station is run by the Nagato Railroad Bureau. There are no members of staff at the station on Mondays, though there is a computerized ticket machine with a touchscreen monitor.

== Platforms ==
1	■ San'in Main Line	for Kottoi, Agawa and Nagatoshi
2	■ San'in Main Line	for Nagato-Futami, Ukahongō, Kogushi and Shimonoseki

== History ==
- 16 August 1925 - The extension of the Japanese National Rail Kogushi Line, as it was then known, from Kogushi Station, is completed. Takibe Station became the new terminus and began servicing passenger as well as freight trains.
- 9 September 1928 - The Kogushi Line is extended to Agawa Station.
- 24 February 1933 - The Kogushi Line is incorporated into the San'in Main Line.
- 1 March 1972 - The service of freight trains is cancelled.
- 1 April 1987 - Under the privatisation of Japan's railways, Takibe Station becomes part of the West Japan Railway Company.
- 1 April 2008 - Takibe switches to a simpler ticket system.

The construction of the San'in Main Line was the final link in connecting the trainlines in the area during the Taishō period. At the time, the plan was to have the entire line along the Sea of Japan coastline, but in line with the wishes of the region's residents, as well as to keep the project in budget, Takibe Station and Kottoi Station were located inland.

In the era of JNR, the first train to Shimonoseki Station from Takibe Station was a local train that departed at 3:29am. With the exception of designated night trains, this was the earliest first departure anywhere in Japan.

== Passenger statistics ==
In fiscal 2020, the station was used by an average of 202 passengers daily.

== Surrounding area ==
- Takibe Post Office
- Shimonoseki City Branch Office (Hōhoku)
- Hōhoku Senior High School
- Hōhoku Junior High School
- Takibe Elementary School
- Shimososeki Special Products Centre
- Hōhoku General Sports Park
- Takibe Hospital
- Takibe Onsen
- Ichinomata Onsen
- Hōhoku Historical Folk Museum (Former main building of Takibe Elementary School)
- The Repputowa Stone Monument
- Mōri Hidekane's Grave

=== Bus Line ===
- Blue Line Bus Service
  - Service to Tsunoshima via Kottoi Station and Tsunoshima Bridge.
  - Service to Toyota.

== See also ==
- List of railway stations in Japan
