= Ukahongō Station =

Railway station in Shimonoseki, Yamaguchi Prefecture, Japan

Ukahongō Station 宇賀本郷駅
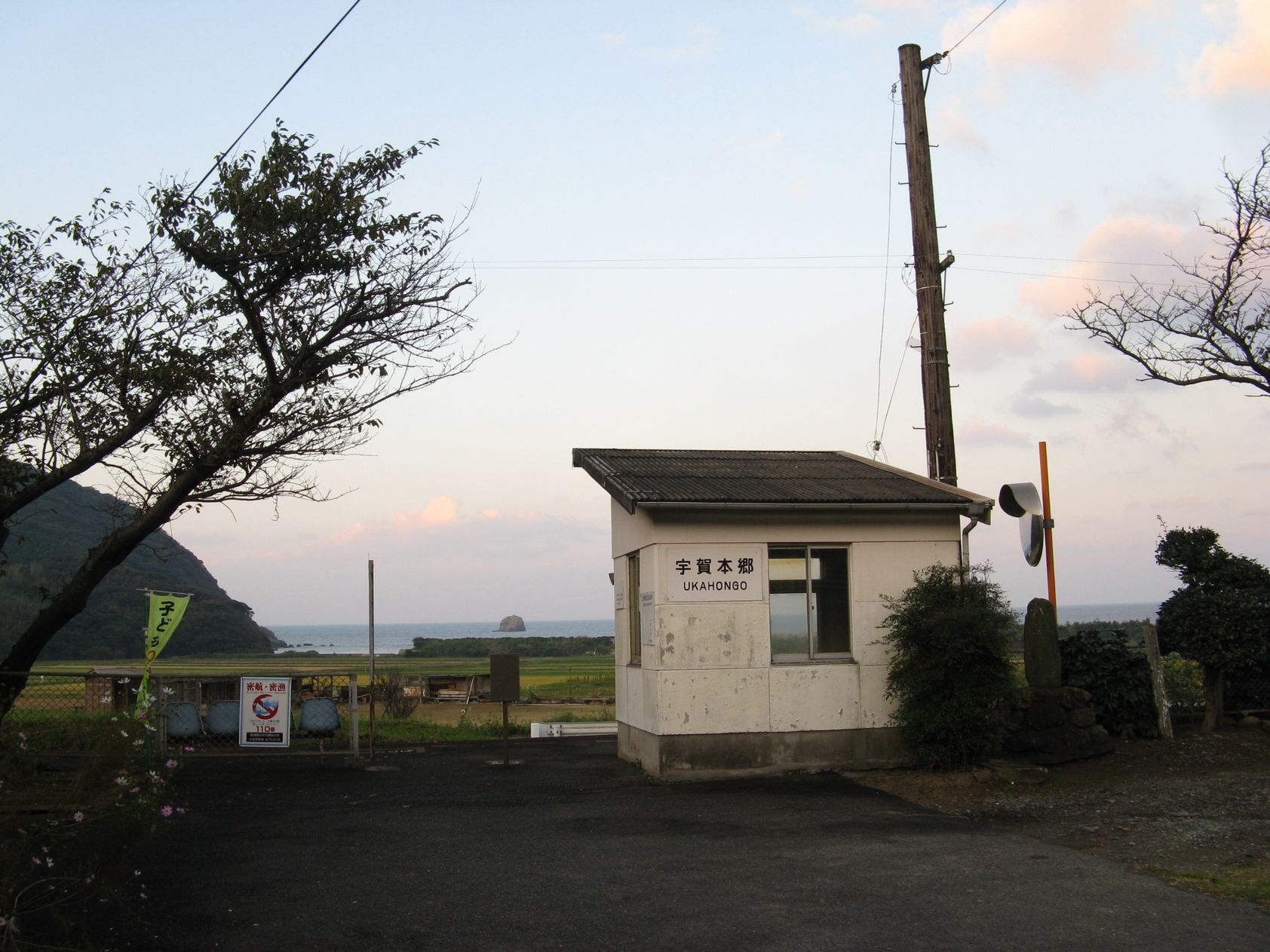
- Ukahongō Station in October 2009

General information
- Location: 4186-5, Toyoura-cho Uka Ueda, Shimonoseki-shi, Yamaguchi-ken 759-6303; Japan
- Coordinates: 34°13′38.73″N 130°55′39.21″E
- Owner: West Japan Railway Company
- Operator: West Japan Railway Company
- Line: San'in Main Line
- Distance: 643.5 km (399.9 miles) from Kyoto
- Platforms: 1 side platform
- Tracks: 1
- Connections: Bus stop

Other information
- Status: Unstaffed
- Website: Official website

History
- Opened: 19 July 1958; 68 years ago

Passengers
- FY2020: 2

Services
Preceding station	JR West	Following station
Yutama towards Shimonoseki	San'in Main Line E Local	Nagato-Futami towards Masuda
Location
- Location within Yamaguchi Prefecture Location within Japan

Ukahongō Station (宇賀本郷駅, Ukahongō-eki) is a passenger railway station located in the city of Shimonoseki, Yamaguchi Prefecture, Japan. It is operated by the West Japan Railway Company (JR West).

== Lines ==
Ukahongō Station is served by the JR West San'in Main Line, and is located 643.5 kilometers from the terminus of the line at Kyoto.

== Station layout ==
The station consists of a single side platform serving one bi-directional track. The station is unattended.

←:for Nagato-Futami	→:for Yutama

== History ==
Ukahongō Station was opened on 19 July 1958. With the privatization of the Japan National Railway (JNR) on 1 April 1987, the station came under the aegis of the West Japan railway Company (JR West).

== Passenger statistics ==
In fiscal 2020, the station was used by an average of 2 passengers daily.

== Surrounding area ==
The station is hidden among the surrounding houses, making it difficult to see from a distance. The sea is close across the field, and the scenery from the train window is good because it passes along the coast from the neighboring Nagato Futami Station to Kogushi Station.

- Japan National Route 191

== See also ==
- List of railway stations in Japan
