= Tsunoshima Bridge =

Bridge in Yamaguchi Prefecture, Japan

Tsunoshima Bridge 角島大橋
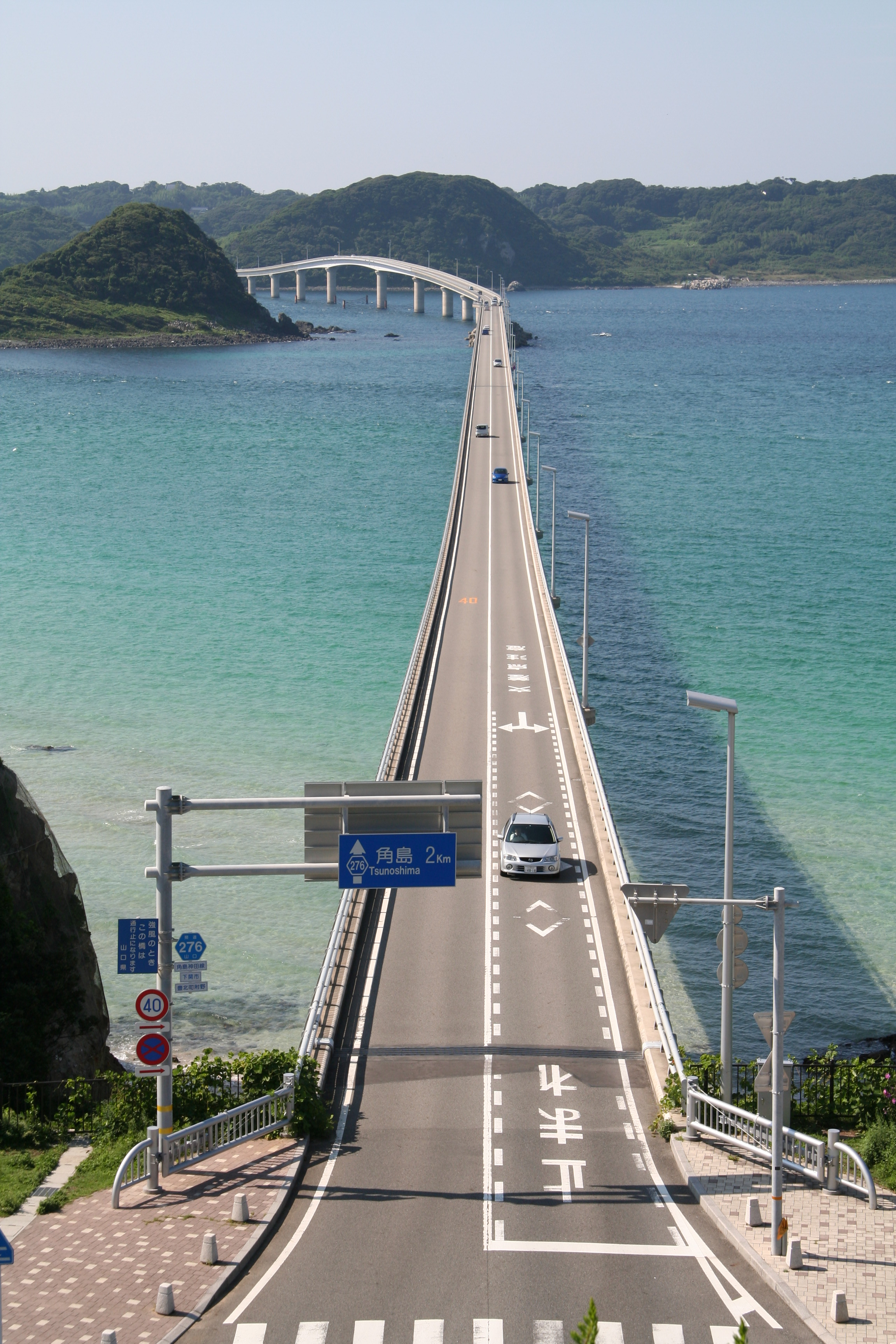
- The bridge as viewed from the mainland
- Coordinates: 34°21′09″N 130°53′13″E
- Crosses: Amagaseto Strait, Sea of Japan
- Begins: Shimonoseki
- Ends: Tsunoshima

Characteristics
- Total length: 1,780 m (5,840 ft)

History
- Construction start: September 1993
- Opened: November 3, 2000

Location
- Interactive map of Tsunoshima Bridge

Tsunoshima Bridge (Japanese: 角島大橋, Hepburn: Tsunoshima-Ōhashi) is a bridge located in Yamaguchi Prefecture, Japan. The 1,780 m (5,840 ft) bridge connects the island of Tsunoshima to mainland Japan.

== Overview ==
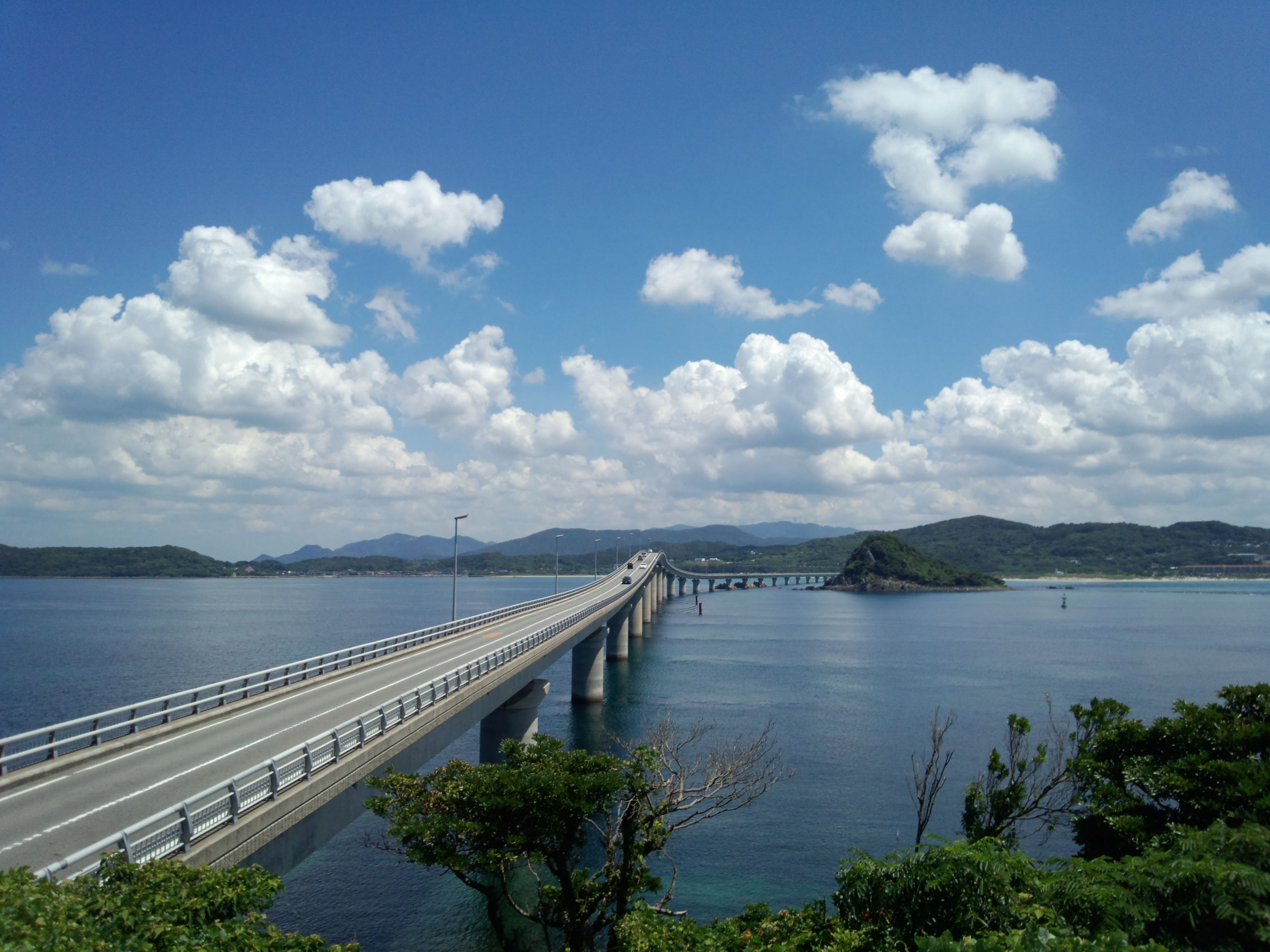
The bridge as viewed from Tsunoshima

Tsunoshima Bridge crosses the Amagaseto Strait in the Sea of Japan, linking the island of Tsunoshima with the mainland at Hōhoku, Shimonoseki. It is 1,780 m (5,840 ft) long, making it the second-longest bridge in Japan behind the Akashi Kaikyō Bridge.

The bridge is noted for its distinctive curved shape: it proceeds straight as it extends from the mainland before curving as it passes Hatoshima, an uninhabited island located in the strait. As Tsunoshima Bridge is located within the borders of Kita-Nagato Kaigan Quasi-National Park, the bridge was intentionally curved to avoid passing through Hatoshima, thus preserving its natural environment; the height of the bridge was also limited to preserve the landscape of the surrounding area.

== History ==
Prior to the construction of Tsunoshima Bridge, Tsunoshima and the mainland were connected by a ferry that made seven daily round-trips. The ferry was frequently delayed and cancelled due to inclement weather, particularly in the winter; in 1983, a group of roughly 100 island residents formed a group to advocate for the construction of a bridge. Construction on Tsunoshima Bridge began in September 1993, with a total project cost of JP¥14.9 billion. The bridge opened on November 3, 2000. In 2003, the bridge was recognized with the Excellence Award by the Japan Society of Civil Engineers for its environmentally-conscious design.

== Tourism ==
While the transportation access provided by Tsunoshima Bridge has contributed significantly to Tsunoshima's tourism industry, the bridge is itself a popular tourist destination for its panoramic views of the island and its proximity to several sub-tropical beaches. Several viewing platforms and other amenities are located at Amagase Park, a park that is split into two sections on both ends of the bridge. Automobile commercials and television dramas are frequently filmed on and around the bridge.

== Gallery ==
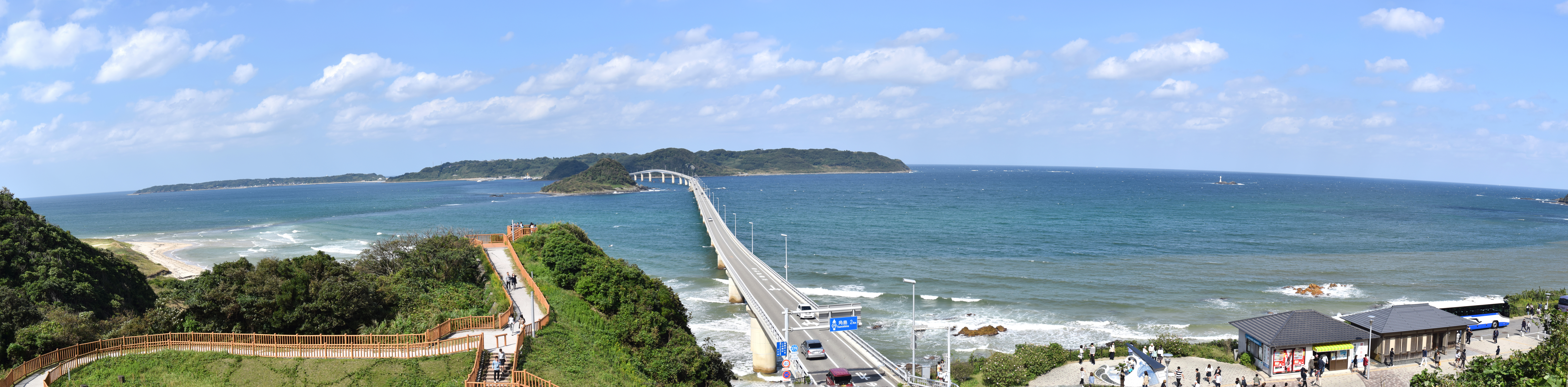
Panorama of Tsunoshima Bridge from the mainland side of the bridge

== See also ==
- Tsunoshima Lighthouse
