= Kottoi Station =

Railway station in Shimonoseki, Yamaguchi Prefecture, Japan

Kottoi Station 特牛駅
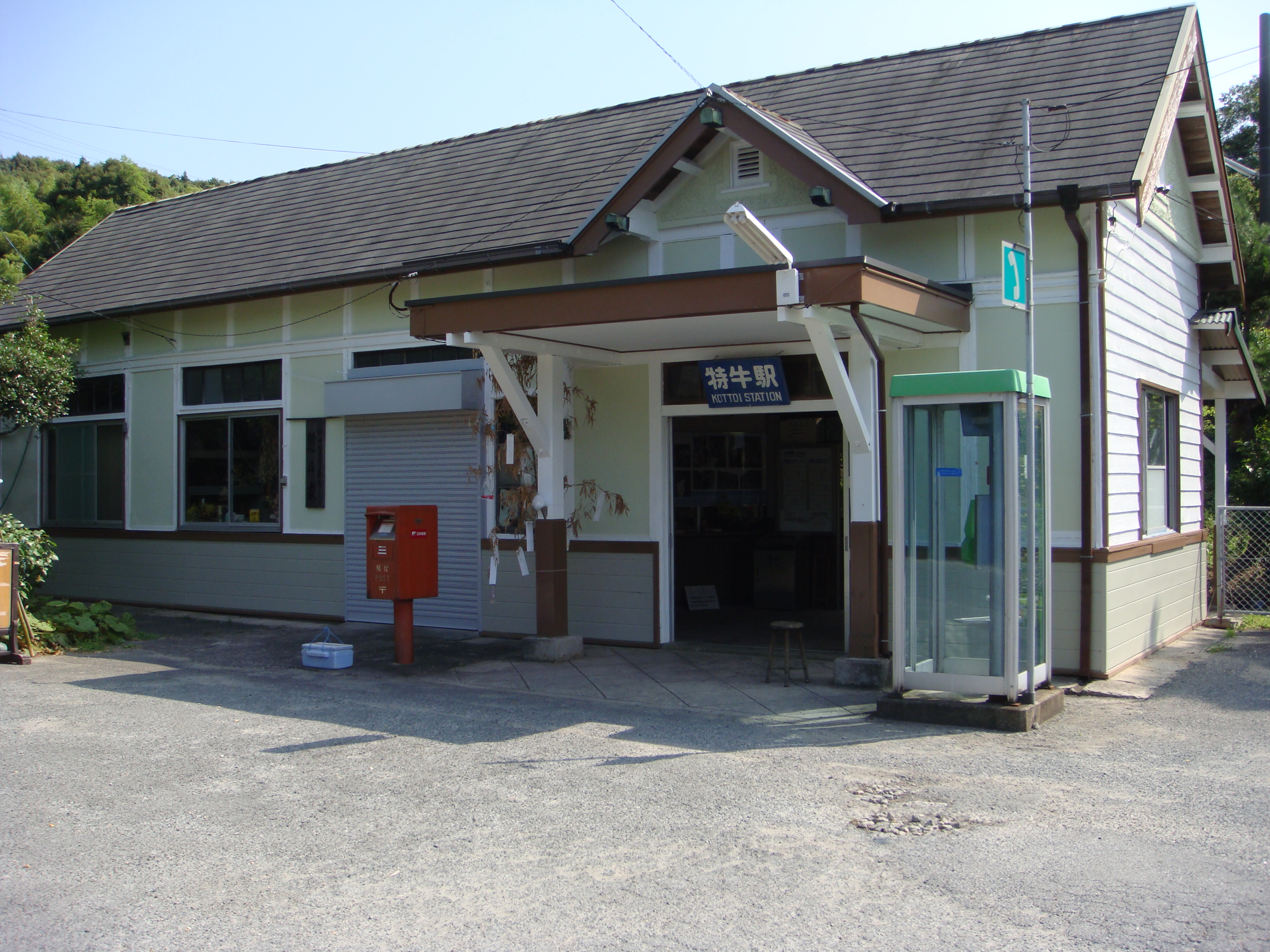
- Kottoi Station in October 2022

General information
- Location: 264-2, Hōhoku-chō Kanda Obagasako, Shimonoseki-shi, Yamaguchi-ken 759-5331; Japan
- Coordinates: 34°18′21″N 130°55′08″E
- Owner: West Japan Railway Company
- Operator: West Japan Railway Company
- Line: San'in Main Line
- Distance: 631.1 km (392.1 miles) from Kyoto
- Platforms: 1 side platform
- Connections: Bus stop

Other information
- Status: Unstaffed
- Website: Official website

History
- Opened: 9 September 1928; 98 years ago

Passengers
- FY2020: 7 daily

Services
Preceding station	JR West	Following station
Takibe towards Shimonoseki	San'in Main Line E Local	Agawa towards Masuda
Location
- Location within Yamaguchi Prefecture Location within Japan

Kottoi Station (特牛駅, Kottoi-eki) is a railway station located in the Hōhoku area of the city of Shimonoseki, Yamaguchi Prefecture, Japan. It is operated by the West Japan Railway Company (JR West). People who disembark at Kottoi Station can take a 20-minute bus ride to Tsunoshima via the Tsunoshima Bridge, a 1,780-metre-long (5,840 ft) bridge that joins Tsunoshima to the mainland at Hōhoku Town. It was the longest toll free bridge in Japan when it was completed on November 3, 2000.

== Lines ==
Kottoi Station is served by the JR West San'in Main Line, and is located 631.1 kilometers from the terminus of the line at Kyoto

== Station layout ==
Kottoi Station is housed in its original wooden-framed station building. It is a one-track, single side platform station. Because of this single line structure, trains bound for Nagatoshi Station and Kogushi Station stop at the same platform. Previously the platform had a siding track, allowing trains that were traveling in different directions to pass one another, however this was discontinued in 1970. The station is run by the Nagato Railroad Bureau. Though there are no staff members at the station, some tickets can be purchased from a small shop in front of the station. As there is a difference in height of a few meters between the station building and the platform, there is a staircase to the platform which crosses over the old track. There is a waiting room on the platform side of the station building, but there is no door. The station is located considerably higher than the village it serves.

== History ==
- 9 September 1928 - The extension of the Japanese National Rail Kogushi Line, as it was then known, from Takibe Station to Agawa Station, is completed. Services for passenger and freight trains commence.
- 24 February 1933 - The Kogushi Line is incorporated into the San'in Main Line.
- 1 August 1961 - The service of freight trains is cancelled.
- 1 April 1987 - Under the privatisation of Japan's railways, Kottoi Station becomes part of the West Japan Railway Company.

== Etymology ==
The origin of the area name Kottoi has been addressed in various media, particularly as a station name which is difficult to read by Japanese standards. There are two ideas about the origin of the place name. The first comes from the regional way of expressing the word cow (牝牛, meushi) as kottoi. The second comes from an inlet which faces the Sea of Japan known as Kotoe (琴江, kotoe). It is also said to mean "a robust cow that will bear a heavy load".

== Passenger statistics ==
In fiscal 2020, the station was used by an average of 7 passengers daily.

== Surrounding area ==
- Kottoi Fishing Harbour
- Tsunoshima - Before the Tsunoshima Bridge was constructed, the area was home to the Hiju Port (肥中, hijūkō) which connected the island to the mainland. Tsunoshima was also connected via Shimado Port (島戸港, shimadokō) which also had a connecting bus service. Now there is a direct bus to the island.
- Japan National Route 435

=== Bus line ===
- Blue Line Bus Service

== See also ==
- List of railway stations in Japan
