= Kiwado Station =

Railway station in Nagato, Yamaguchi Prefecture, Japan

Kiwado Station 黄波戸駅
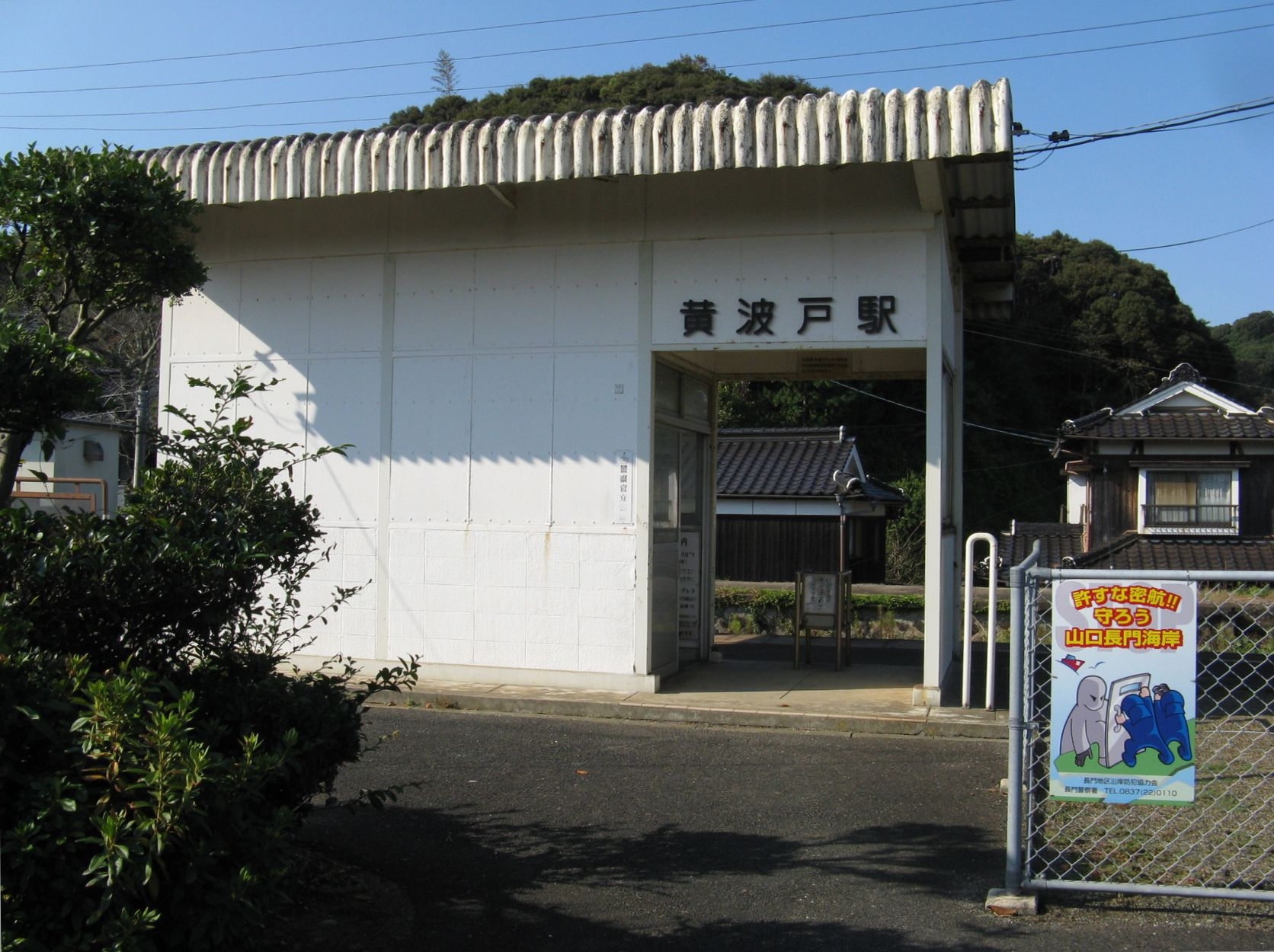
- Kiwado Station in October 2009

General information
- Location: 2008-3, Hekikami Kiwado, Nagato-shi, Yamaguchi-ken 759-4401; Japan
- Coordinates: 34°23′7.07″N 131°8′23.3″E
- Owner: West Japan Railway Company
- Operator: West Japan Railway Company
- Line: San'in Main Line
- Distance: 604.9 km (375.9 miles) from Kyoto
- Platforms: 1 side platform
- Tracks: 1
- Connections: Bus stop

Other information
- Status: Unstaffed
- Website: Official website

History
- Opened: 9 December 1928; 97 years ago

Passengers
- FY2020: 12

Services
Preceding station	JR West	Following station
Nagato-Furuichi towards Shimonoseki	San'in Main Line E Local	Nagatoshi towards Masuda
Location
- Location within Yamaguchi Prefecture Location within Japan

Kiwado Station (黄波戸駅, Kiwado-eki) is a passenger railway station located in the city of Nagato, Yamaguchi Prefecture, Japan. It is operated by the West Japan Railway Company (JR West).

== Lines ==
Kiwado Station is served by the JR West San'in Main Line, and is located 604.9 kilometers from the terminus of the line at Kyoto.

== Station layout ==
The station consists of one side platform serving a single bi-directional track. It was originally a station with two opposite side platforms and two tracks, but the old outbound platform was abolished. The small station building is more of a waiting room, as there is no facility for ticket sales. The station is unattended.

== History ==
Kiwado Station was opened on 9 December 1928 on a spur line of the Japan Government Railways Mine Line from Nagatoshi Station. This spur line was extended to Nagato-Furuichi Station on 13 October 1930, and was incorporated into the San'in Main Line on 24 February 1933. Freight operations were discontinued on 1 June 1963. With the privatization of the Japan National Railway (JNR) on 1 April 1987, the station came under the aegis of the West Japan railway Company (JR West).

== Passenger statistics ==
In fiscal 2020, the station was used by an average of 12 passengers daily.

== Surrounding area ==
- Kiwado Onsen

== See also ==
- List of railway stations in Japan
