= Hitomaru Station =

Railway station in Nagato, Yamaguchi Prefecture, Japan

Hitomaru Station 人丸駅
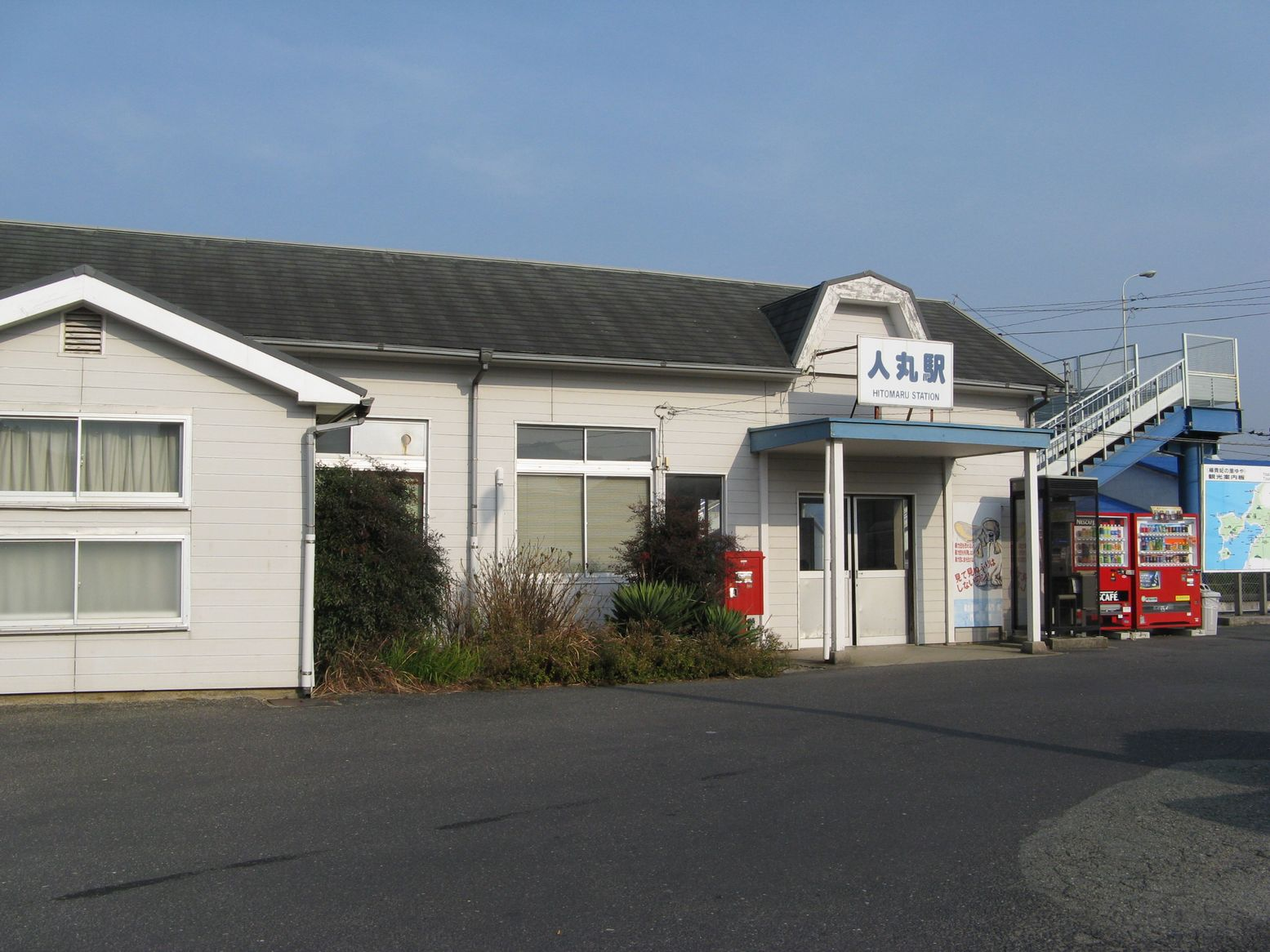
- Hitomaru Station in January 2008

General information
- Location: 939-2, Yuya Shimbetsumyo Aza Kamie, Nagato-shi, Yamaguchi-ken 759-4503; Japan
- Coordinates: 34°22′27.61″N 131°3′28.97″E
- Owner: West Japan Railway Company
- Operator: West Japan Railway Company
- Line: San'in Main Line
- Distance: 613.5 km (381.2 miles) from Kyoto
- Platforms: 1 side + 1 island platform
- Tracks: 3
- Connections: Bus stop

Other information
- Status: Unstaffed
- Website: Official website

History
- Opened: 7 December 1930; 95 years ago

Passengers
- FY2020: 50

Services
Preceding station	JR West	Following station
Igami towards Shimonoseki	San'in Main Line E Local	Nagato-Furuichi towards Masuda
Location
- Location within Yamaguchi Prefecture Location within Japan

Hitomaru Station (人丸駅, Hitomaru-eki) is a passenger railway station located in the city of Nagato, Yamaguchi Prefecture, Japan. It is operated by the West Japan Railway Company (JR West).

== Lines ==
Hitomaru Station is served by the JR West San'in Main Line, and is located 613.5 kilometers from the terminus of the line at Kyoto.

== Station layout ==
The station consists of one side platform and one island platform. The station building is next to the side platform and is connected to the island platform by a footbridge. Platform numbers are assigned from the opposite side of the station building, with Platform 3 on the platform next to the station building and Platforms 1 and 2 on the island platform; however, platform 1 is no longer in regular use. The station is unattended.

== Platforms ==
2	■ San'in Main Line	for Nagatoshi and Higashi-Hagi
3	■ San'in Main Line	for Takibe and Shimonoseki

== History ==
Hitomaru Station was opened on 7 December 1930 as an intermediate station of the Japan Government Railways Mine Line when the line was extended from Nagato-Furuichi Station to Agawa Station. This portion of the Mine Line was incorporated into the San'in Main Line on 24 February 1933. Freight operations were discontinued on 1 March 1972. With the privatization of the Japan National Railway (JNR) on 1 April 1987, the station came under the aegis of the West Japan railway Company (JR West).

== Passenger statistics ==
In fiscal 2020, the station was used by an average of 50 passengers daily.

== Surrounding area ==
- Nagato City Hall Yuya General Branch (former Yuya town hall)
- Hachiman Hiromaru Shrine -

== See also ==
- List of railway stations in Japan
