= Nagato-Motoyama Station =

Railway station in San'yō-Onoda, Yamaguchi Prefecture, Japan

Nagato-Motoyama Station 長門本山駅
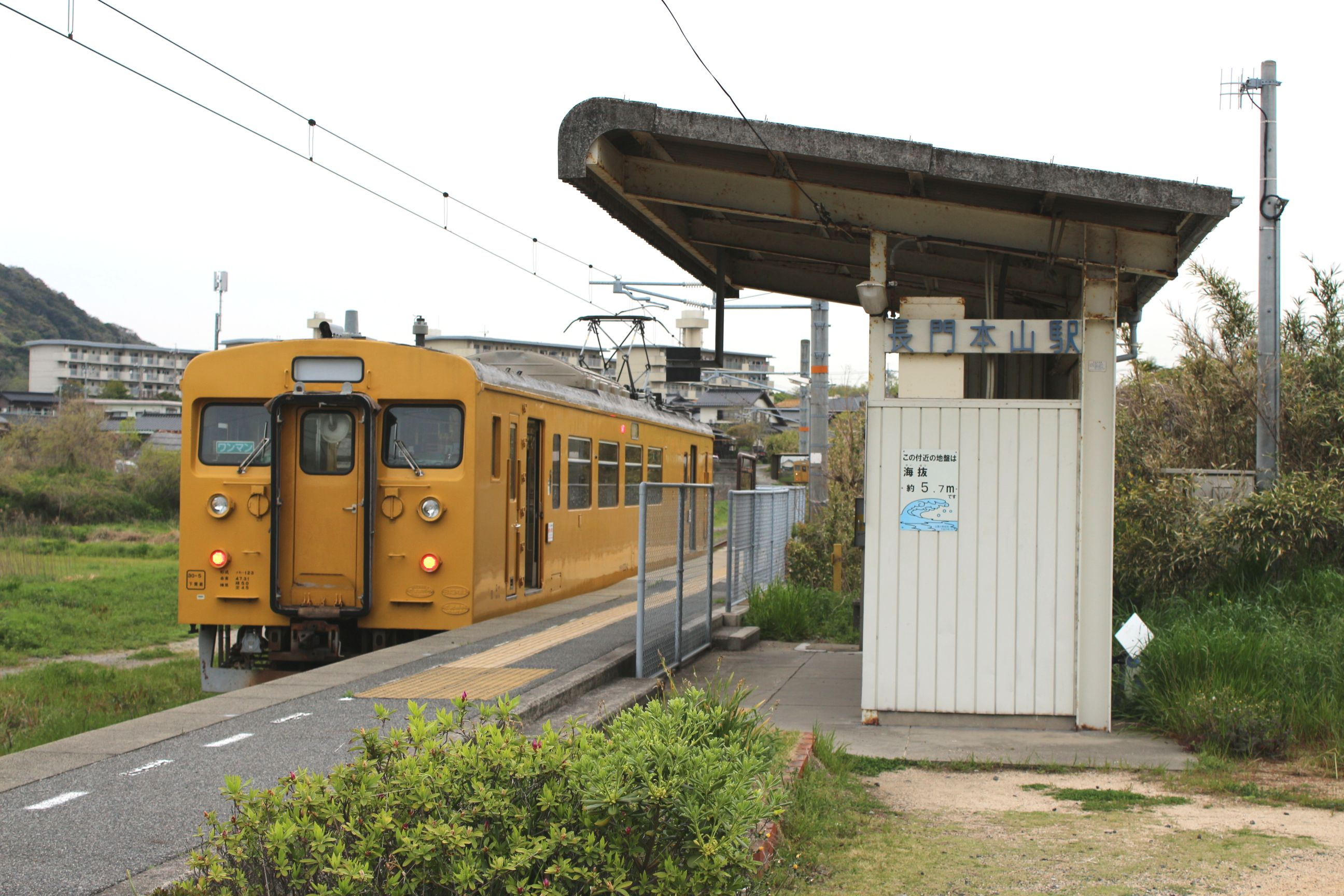
- Nagato-Motoyama Station in April 2021

General information
- Location: Onoda, San'yō-Onoda-shi, Yamaguchi-ken 756-0817; Japan
- Coordinates: 33°56′34.16″N 131°10′24.02″E
- Owner: West Japan Railway Company
- Operator: West Japan Railway Company
- Line: Onoda Line
- Distance: 2.3 km (1.4 mi) from Suzumeda
- Platforms: 1 side platform
- Tracks: 2
- Connections: Bus stop

Other information
- Status: Unstaffed
- Website: Official website

History
- Opened: January 21, 1937
- Former names: Motoyama (to 1941)

Passengers
- FY2020: 11

Services
Preceding station	JR West	Following station
Hamagōchi towards Ube-Shinkawa	Onoda Line (Motoyama Branch)	Terminus
Location
- Location within Yamaguchi Prefecture Location within Japan

Nagato-Motoyama Station (長門本山駅, Nagato-Motoyama-eki) is a passenger railway station located in the city of San'yō-Onoda, Yamaguchi Prefecture, Japan. It is operated by the West Japan Railway Company (JR West).

== Lines ==
Nagato-Motoyama Station is the terminus of the JR West Onoda Line branch line, and is located 2.3 kilometers from the junction with the main line at Suzumeda.

== Station layout ==
The station consists of one ground-level side platform serving a single dead-headed track. There is no station building, but there is a small shelter near the platform. The station is unattended.

== History ==
Nagato-Motoyama Station was opened on 21 January 1937 as Motoyama Station (本山駅, Motoyama-eki)on the Ube Electric Railway. The Ube Electric Railway merged with the Ube Railway on 1 December 1941 and the station was renamed to its present name on that date, The Ube Railway was railway nationalized in 1943. With the privatization of the Japan National Railway (JNR) on 1 April 1987, the station came under the aegis of the West Japan railway Company (JR West).

== Passenger statistics ==
In fiscal 2020, the station was used by an average of 11 passengers daily.

== Surrounding area ==
The station is located along the Suo Sea at the southern end of Sanyo-Onoda. Yamaguchi Prefectural Route 354 Tsumazaki Kaisaku Onoda Line runs past the station. The area around the station is a residential area.

- Former Motoyama Coal Mine Inclined Mine (City Designated Cultural Property): See also Ube Coal Mine.
- Ryuozan Park
- Kirara Beach
- Sanyo Onoda Municipal Motoyama Elementary School

== See also ==
- List of railway stations in Japan
