= Kogushi Station =

Railway station in Shimonoseki, Yamaguchi Prefecture, Japan

Kogushi Station 小串駅
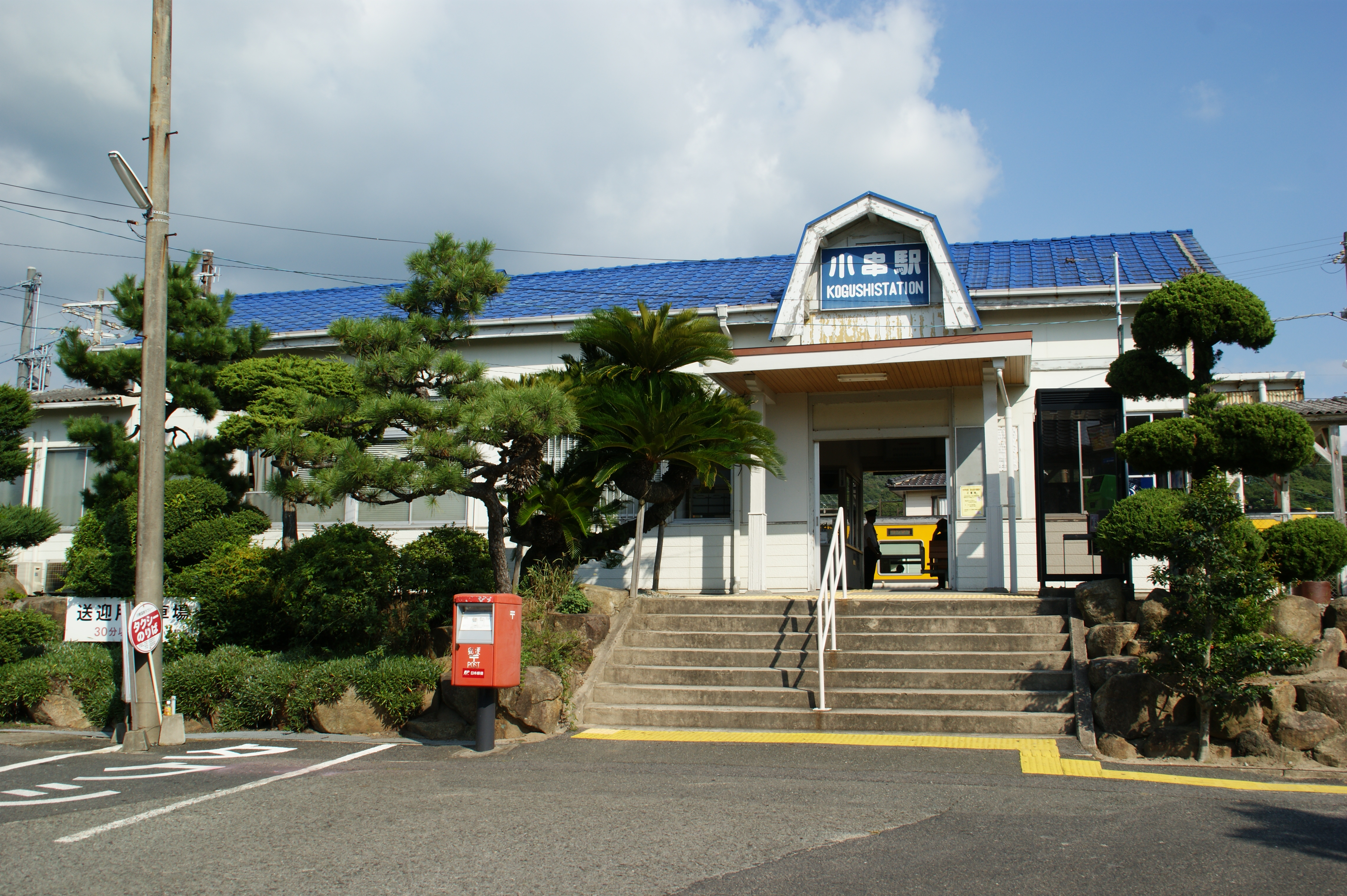
- Kogushi Station in September 2008

General information
- Location: 3019, Toyoura-cho Kogushi Ishido, Shimonoseki-shi, Yamaguchi-ken 759-6302; Japan
- Coordinates: 34°10′10.93″N 130°55′40.68″E
- Owner: West Japan Railway Company
- Operator: West Japan Railway Company
- Line: San'in Main Line
- Distance: 650.2 km (404.0 miles) from Kyoto
- Platforms: 1side + 1 island platforms
- Tracks: 3
- Connections: Bus stop

Other information
- Status: Unstaffed
- Website: Official website

History
- Opened: 22 April 1914; 112 years ago

Passengers
- FY2020: 187

Services
Preceding station	JR West	Following station
Kawatana-Onsen towards Shimonoseki	San'in Main Line E Local Rapid	Yutama towards Masuda
Location
- Location within Yamaguchi Prefecture Location within Japan

Kogushi Station (小串駅, Kogushi-eki) is a passenger railway station located in the city of Shimonoseki, Yamaguchi Prefecture, Japan. It is operated by the West Japan Railway Company (JR West).

== Lines ==
Kogushi Station is served by the JR West San'in Main Line, and is located 650.2 kilometers from the terminus of the line at Kyoto.

== Station layout ==
The station consists of one side platform and one island platform connected to the station building by a footbridge. The station is unattended.

== Platforms ==
1, 2	■ San'in Main Line	for Takibe and Nagatoshi
1, 2, 3	■ San'in Main Line	for Shimonoseki

== History ==
Kogushi Station was opened on 22 April 1914 on the Chōshū Railway, which was railway nationalized in 1925. The line was renamed the San'in Main Line in 1933. With the privatization of the Japan National Railway (JNR) on 1 April 1987, the station came under the aegis of the West Japan railway Company (JR West).

== Passenger statistics ==
In fiscal 2020, the station was used by an average of 187 passengers daily.

== Surrounding area ==
- Japan National Route 191
- Shimonoseki City Hall Ogushi Branch
- Yamaguchi Saiseikai Toyoura Hospital
- Yamaguchi Prefectural Toyoura Comprehensive Support School
- Shimonoseki Municipal Yumegaoka Junior High School

== See also ==
- List of railway stations in Japan
