= Toyoura, Yamaguchi =

Dissolved municipality in Yamaguchi prefecture, Japan

Toyoura (豊浦町, Toyoura-chō) was a town located in Toyoura District, Yamaguchi Prefecture, Japan.

As of 2003, the town had an estimated population of 19,918 and a density of 262.63 persons per km^{2}. The total area was 75.84 km^{2}.

On February 13, 2005, Toyoura, along with the towns of Hōhoku, Kikugawa and Toyota (all from Toyoura District), was merged into the expanded city of Shimonoseki.

Toyoura-cho was composed of four villages (now hamlets), the largest of which is called Kawatana. Kawatana is famous for its hot springs (Kawatana Onsen) and kawara soba (green tea buckwheat noodles).
