= Toyoura District, Yamaguchi =

Former district in Yamaguchi prefecture, Japan

Toyoura (豊浦郡, Toyoura-gun) was a district located in Yamaguchi Prefecture, Japan.

The district area covered the city of Shimonoseki (excluding the former villages of Tamaki and Yoshida in Mine District) and Toyotamae in the city of Mine.

As of 2003, the district had an estimated population of 47,259. The total area was 491.72 km^{2}.

Until February 12, 2005, the district had four towns.

- Hōhoku
- Kikugawa
- Toyoura
- Toyota

On February 13, 2005, the towns of Hōhoku, Kikugawa, Toyoura and Toyota were merged into the expanded city of Shimonoseki. Toyoura District was dissolved as a result of this merger.

== History ==
=== Timeline ===
- 1878 - Due to land reforms, the borough of Akamaseki (now the city of Shimonoseki) broke off.
- 1889 - Due to municipal status enforcement, 31 villages were formed.
- September 1, 1898:
  - The village of 豊東前村 was renamed to become the village of Oji.
  - The village of 豊東上村 was renamed to become the village of Katsuyama.
  - The village of 豊東下村 was renamed to become the village of Ikuno.
  - The village of 豊西東村 was renamed to become the village of Kuroi.
- April 1, 1899:
  - The village of 豊東郷村 was renamed to become the village of Narazaki.
  - The village of 豊田奥村 was renamed to become the village of Nishiichi.
- July 1, 1910 - The village of 豊西中村 was renamed to become the village of Yasuoka.
- April 1, 1911 - The village of Chōfu was elevated to town status to become the town of Chōfu. (1 town, 30 villages)
- April 1, 1912 - The village of Toyotakami was renamed to become the village of Tonoi.
- September 1, 1914 - The village of 豊西下村 was renamed to become the village of Kawanaka.
- May 1, 1918 - The village of 神田下村 was renamed to become the village of Kanda.
- January 10, 1921 - The village of Ikuno was merged into the city of Shimonoseki. (1 town, 29 villages)
- October 1, 1921 - The village of Hikoshima was elevated to town status to become the town of Hikoshima. (2 towns, 28 villages)
- October 1, 1922 - The village of 豊西上村 was renamed to become the village of Yoshimi.
- February 11, 1924 - The village of Nishiichi was elevated to town status to become the town of Nishiichi. (3 towns, 27 villages)
- February 11, 1925 - The village of Yasuoka was elevated to town status to become the town of Yasuoka. (4 towns, 26 villages)
- May 1, 1925 - The village of Kogushi was elevated to town status to become the town of Kogushi. (5 towns, 25 villages)
- November 3, 1932 - The village of Ozuki was elevated to town status to become the town of Ozuki. (6 towns, 24 villages)
- March 20, 1933 - The town of Hikoshima was merged into the city of Shimonoseki. (5 towns, 24 villages)
- March 26, 1937 - The town of Chōfu was merged into the city of Shimonoseki. (4 towns, 24 villages)
- November 15, 1937 - The town of Yasuoka, and the village of Kawanaka were merged into the city of Shimonoseki. (3 towns, 23 villages)
- May 17, 1939 - The town of Ozuki, and the villages of Kiyosu, Oji, Katsuyama and Yoshimi were merged into the city of Shimonoseki. (2 towns, 19 villages)
- April 1, 1951 - The villages of Narazaki and Okaeda were merged to create the village of Kikukawa. (2 towns, 18 villages)
- June 1, 1953 - The town of Toyotamae was elevated to town status to become the town of Toyotamae. (3 towns, 17 villages)
- March 31, 1954 - The town of Toyotamae was merged with 2 towns and 3 villages (all from Mine District) to create the city of Mine. (2 towns, 17 villages)
- November 1, 1954 - The town of Nishiichi, and the villages of Tonoi, Toyotanaka and Toyotashimo were merged to create the town of Toyota. (2 towns, 14 villages)
- April 1, 1955: (4 towns, 3 villages)
  - The villages of Toyonishi, Kuroi, Kawatana and Uka (locality of Uka) were merged to create the town of Toyoura.
  - The villages of Kamitama, Tsunoshima, Kanda, Agawa, Awano, Takibe, Tasuki, and Uka (locality of Kitauka) were merged to create the town of Hōhoku.
- April 10, 1955 - The villages of Kikugawa, 豊東村, and Utsui (locality of Nisshin) were merged to create the town of Kikugawa. (5 towns, 1 village)
- November 1, 1955 - The village of Utsui (remaining parts) was merged into the city of Shimonoseki. (5 towns)
- July 1, 1956 - The town of Kogushi was merged into the town of Toyoura. (4 towns)
- February 13, 2005 - The towns of Hōhoku, Kikugawa, Toyoura and Toyota were merged into the expanded city of Shimonoseki. Toyoura District was dissolved as a result of this merger.

== See also ==
- List of dissolved districts of Japan
