= Kikugawa, Yamaguchi =

- Coordinates: 34°7′17.8″N 131°1′50.8″E

Area
  - Total: 83.78 km^{2} (32.35 sq mi)

Population
  - Total: 8,218

Kikugawa (菊川町, Kikugawa-chō) was a town located in Toyoura District, Yamaguchi Prefecture, Japan.

On February 13, 2005, Kikugawa, along with the towns of Hōhoku, Toyoura and Toyota (all from Toyoura District), were merged into the expanded city of Shimonoseki.

== Population ==
As of 2003, the town had an estimated population of 8,218 and a density of 98.09 persons per km^{2}. The total area was 83.78 km^{2}.
