= Toyota, Yamaguchi =

Dissolved municipality in Toyoura district, Yamaguchi prefecture, Japan

- Location within Japan
- Coordinates: 34°12′13.4″N 131°4′33.7″E

Area
  - Total: 163.47 km^{2} (63.12 sq mi)

Population
  - Total: 6,581

Toyota (豊田町, Toyota-chō) was a town located in Toyoura District, Yamaguchi Prefecture, Japan.

== Population ==
As of 2003, the town had an estimated population of 6,581 and a density of 40.26 persons per km^{2}. The total area was 163.47 km^{2}.

== History ==
On February 13, 2005, Toyota, along with the towns of Hōhoku, Kikugawa and Toyoura (all from Toyoura District), was merged into the expanded city of Shimonoseki.

== Attractions ==
=== Fireflies ===
As suggested by the presence of a local museum and a summer festival, Toyota is renowned for its firefly population, which makes an appearance for a short time during the month of June.

Although there are numerous spots where fireflies gather in Toyota, the most popular ones are along the banks of Koya River (木屋川, Koya-gawa), down which one can ride Toyota's famed Firefly Boat (蛍舟, hotaru-bune) during the latter weeks of June.
