= Nagato-Furuichi Station =

Railway station in Nagato, Yamaguchi Prefecture, Japan

Nagato-Furuichi Station 長門古市駅
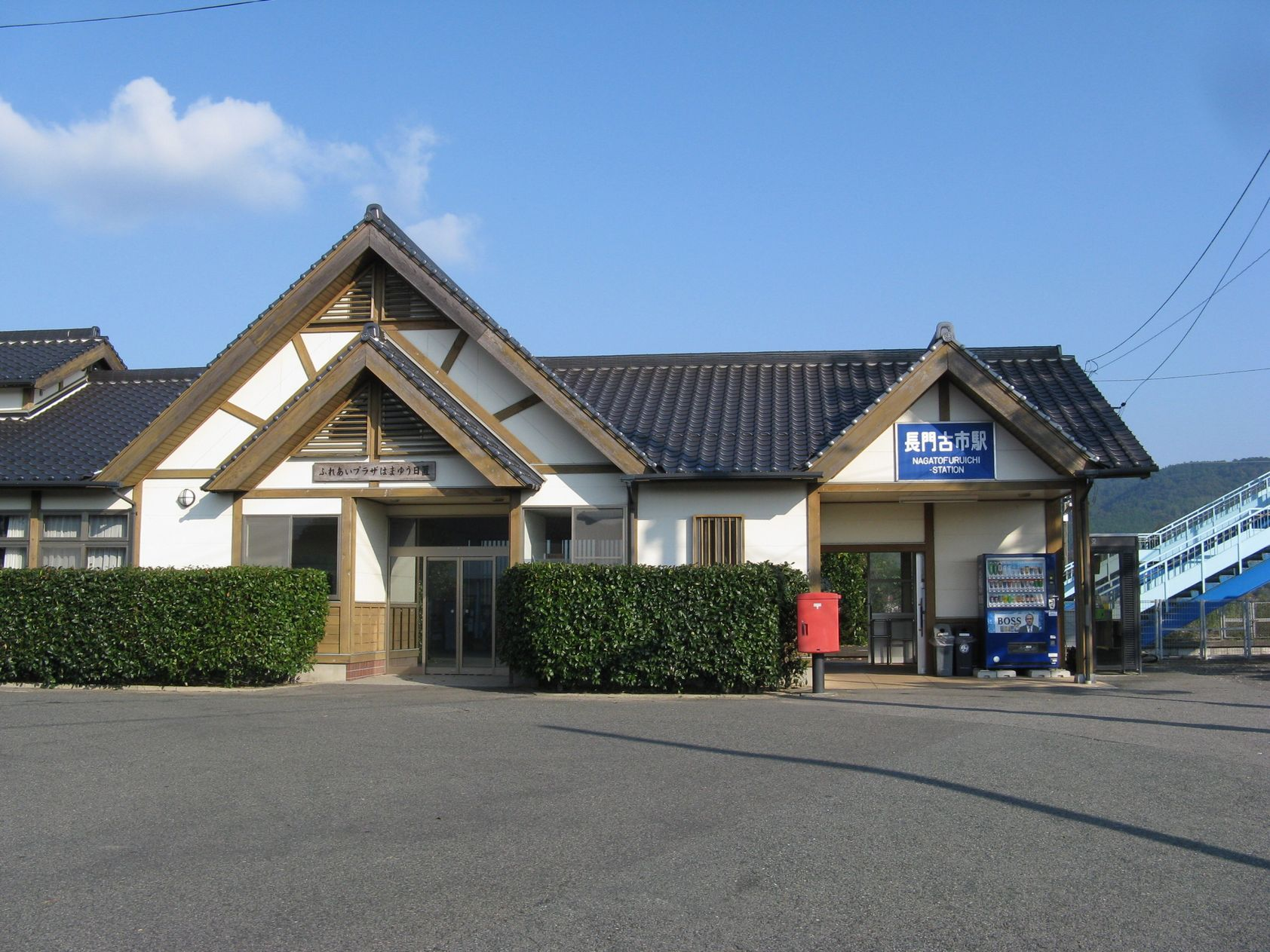
- Nagato-Furuichi Station in October 2009

General information
- Location: 5791-2, Hekikami Aza Gotanda, Nagato-shi, Yamaguchi-ken 759-4401; Japan
- Coordinates: 34°23′18.6″N 131°6′7.52″E
- Owner: West Japan Railway Company
- Operator: West Japan Railway Company
- Line: San'in Main Line
- Distance: 609.0 km (378.4 miles) from Kyoto
- Platforms: 2 side platforms
- Tracks: 2
- Connections: Bus stop

Other information
- Status: Unstaffed
- Website: Official website

History
- Opened: 13 October 1929; 97 years ago

Passengers
- FY2020: 107

Services
| Preceding station | JR West | Following station |
|---|---|---|
| Hitomaru towards Shimonoseki | San'in Main Line E Local | Kiwado towards Masuda |
Location
- Location within Yamaguchi Prefecture Location within Japan

Nagato-Furuichi Station (長門古市駅, Nagato-Furuichi-eki) is a passenger railway station located in the city of Nagato, Yamaguchi Prefecture, Japan. It is operated by the West Japan Railway Company (JR West).

== Lines ==
Nagato-Furuichi Station is served by the JR West San'in Main Line, and is located 609.0 kilometers from the terminus of the line at Kyoto. Only local trains stop at this station.

== Station layout ==
The station consists of two opposed unnumbered side platforms connected to the station building by a footbridge. he station building was renovated in 2001 and has become a community facility called "Fureai Plaza Hamayu Hioki". The station is unattended.

== Platforms ==
| station side | ■ San'in Main Line | for Takibe and Shimonoseki |
| opposite side | ■ San'in Main Line | for Nagatoshi and Higashi-Hagi |

== History ==
Nagato-Furuichi Station was opened on 13 October 1929 as a terminal station of the Japan Government Railways Mine Line when the line was extended from Kiwado Station. The line was further extended to Agawa Station by 7 December 1930. This portion of the Mine Line was incorporated into the San'in Main Line on 24 February 1933. Freight operations were discontinued on 1 June 1961. With the privatization of the Japan National Railway (JNR) on 1 April 1987, the station came under the aegis of the West Japan railway Company (JR West).

== Passenger statistics ==
In fiscal 2020, the station was used by an average of 107 passengers daily.

== Surrounding area ==
- Nagato City Hall Hioki General Branch (former Hioki town hall)
- Hioki Museum of History and Folklore
- Yamaguchi Prefectural Otsu Ryokuyo High School Hioki School Building
- Nagato Municipal Hioki Junior High School
- Nagato Municipal Hioki Elementary School

== See also ==
- List of railway stations in Japan
