= Hōhoku, Yamaguchi =

Hōhoku 豊北町
- Town
- Hōhoku-chō
- Interactive map of Hōhoku
- Country: Japan
- Region: Chūgoku (San'yō) (San'in)
- Prefecture: Yamaguchi Prefecture
- District: Toyoura (dissolved)

Area
  - Total: 168.61 km^{2} (65.10 sq mi)

Population (2005)
  - Total: 12,740
  - Density: 75.56/km^{2} (195.7/sq mi)
- Time zone: UTC+09:00 (JST)
- City hall address: 3140-1 Oaza Takibe, Hōhoku-chō, Shimonoseki-shi, Yamaguchi-ken; 759-5592
- Symbols
- Flower: Hill Cherry
- Tree: Camellia

Hōhoku (豊北町, Hōhoku-chō) was a town located in Toyoura District, Yamaguchi Prefecture, Japan.

As of January 31, 2005, the town had an estimated population of 12,740 and a density of 75.56 persons per km^{2}. The total area is 168.61 km^{2}.

On February 13, 2005, Hōhoku, along with the towns of Kikugawa, Toyoura and Toyota (all from Toyoura District), was merged into the expanded city of Shimonoseki.

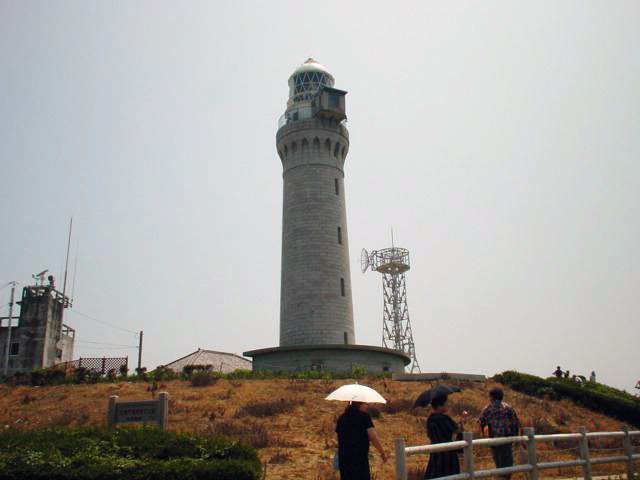
The last of Brunton's 26 lighthouses at Tsunoshima island, Hohoku, Shimonoseki, Yamaguchi Prefecture

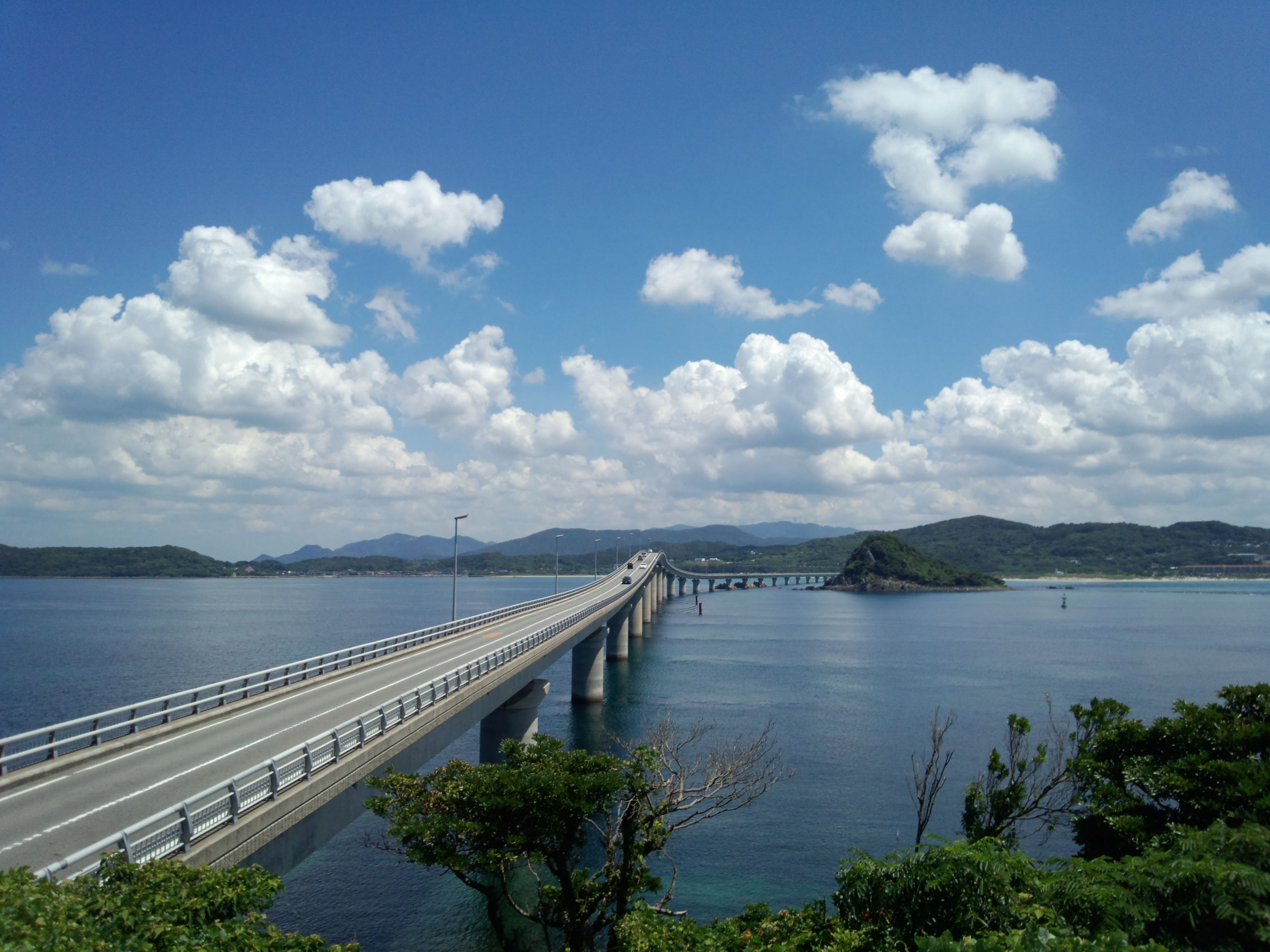
Tsunoshima Bridge

== Famous Residents ==
- Masaaki Ikenaga: Former baseball player for the Nishitetsu Lions.
- SION: Singer-songwriter
- Kikusha Tagami: Edo-period poet
- Taichi Nakayama: Founder of Nakayama Taiyoudou Cosmetics (now Club Cosmetics Co., Ltd)
- Kiyoshi Sasabe: Film director
- Keiko Umeda: Announcer
- Ryuji Fujita: Japanese artist
- Kumiko Sakino: Volleyball player
- Masami Yamamoto: President of Fujitsu Ltd
- Shouzan Sasaki: Member of the Imperial Diet
- Saburo Akieda: Lieutenant in the Imperial Japanese Navy, and a member of the 8th Submarine Squadron
- Tagami Kikusha: Poet
