= Japan National Route 191 =

National highway in Japan

National Route 191
- 国道191号
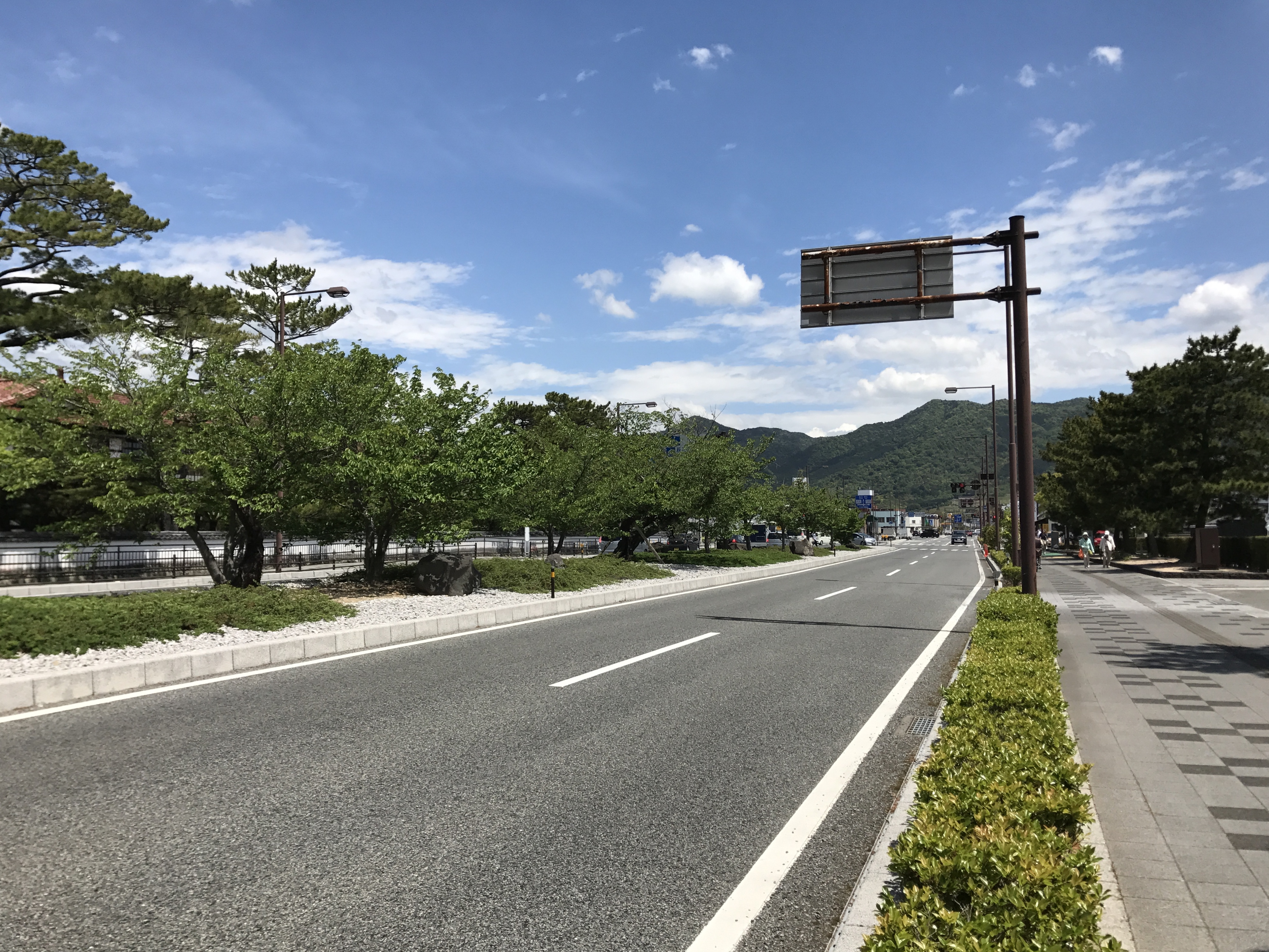

Route information
- Length: 284.1 km (176.5 mi)
- Existed: 18 May 1953–present

Major junctions
- West end: National Route 9 in Shimonoseki
- East end: National Route 2 in Naka-ku, Hiroshima

Location
- Country: Japan

Highway system
- National highways of Japan; Expressways of Japan
| ← National Route 190 | → National Route 192 |

National Route 191 is a national highway in Japan connecting Shimonoseki, Yamaguchi and Naka-ku, Hiroshima in Japan, with a total length of 284.1 km (176.5 mi).
