= Yasuoka =

Yasuoka may refer to:

- Yasuoka (surname), a Japanese surname
- Yasuoka, Nagano, a village located in Shimoina District, Nagano Prefecture, Japan
- Yasuoka Station, Shimonoseki, Yamaguchi Prefecture
