= Ayaragigō Site =

Ayaragigō site
- 綾羅木郷遺跡 (Japanese)
- Reconstructed pit dwelling

- Ayaragigō site Ayaragigō Site (Japan)
- 34°0′46.0″N 130°55′28.3″E
- Type: settlement
- Periods: Yayoi period
- Location: Shimonoseki, Yamaguchi, Japan
- Region: San'yō region

History
- Built: 2nd century BC to 2nd century AD

Site notes
- Elevation: 10 m (33 ft)
- Public access: Yes (museum)
- National Historic Site of Japan

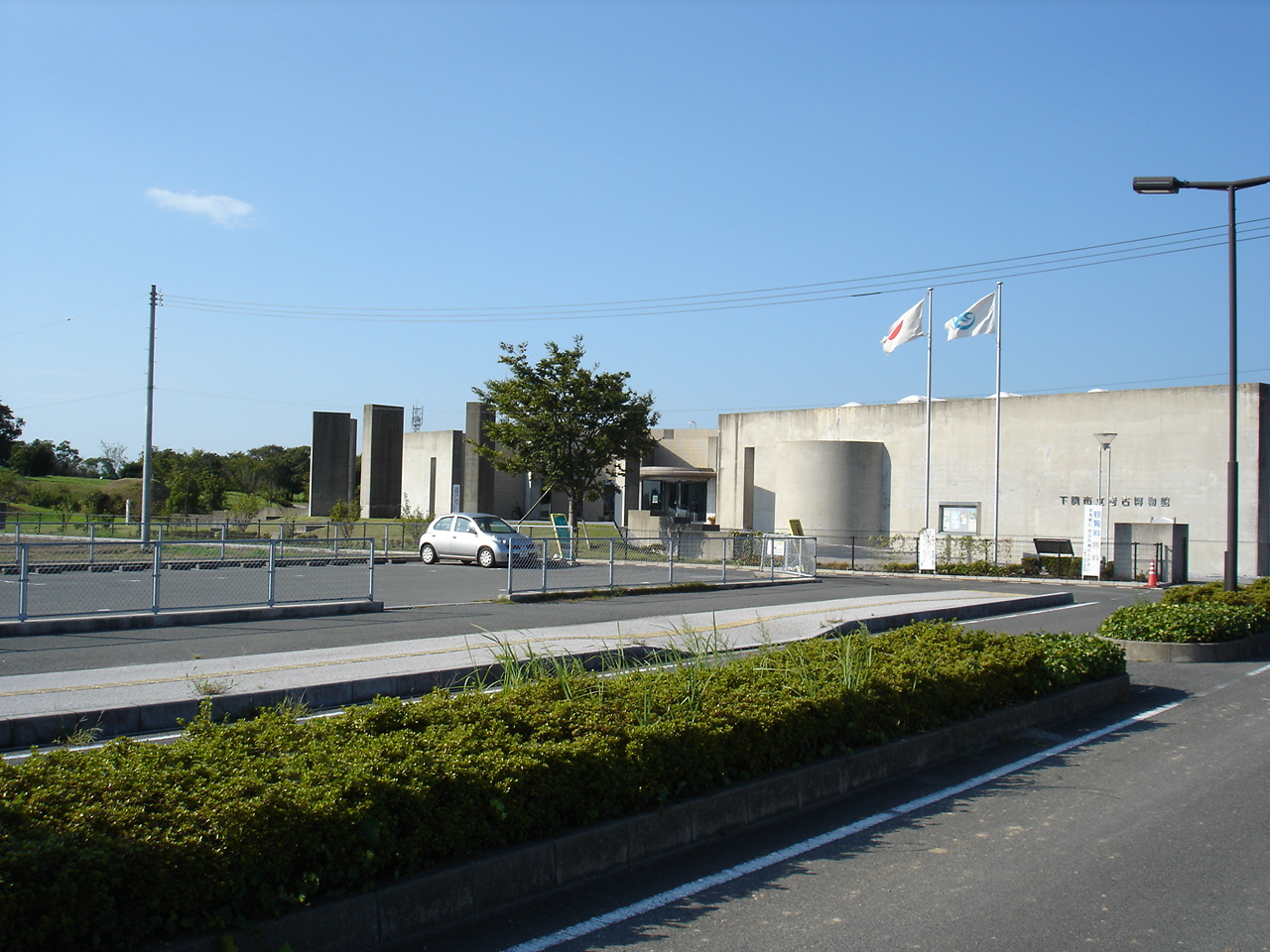
Shimonoseki Archaeological Museum

The Ayaragigō Site (綾羅木郷遺跡, Ayaragigō iseki) is an archaeological site with traces of a Yayoi period settlement, located in the Ayaragi neighborhood of the city of Shimonoseki, Yamaguchi in the San'yō region of Japan. The site was designated a National Historic Site in 1969 with the area under protection expanded in 1981.

== Overview ==
The Ayaragigō site is located about 250 meters east of the present-day coast of Hibiki Bay on a silica sand plateau with an elevation of 20 to 30 meters. Yayoi pottery and stone tools were discovered on the site in 1898 and full scale archaeological excavation began from 1956. The settlement was surrounded by a substantial ring moat, more than two meters wide and three meters deep, with a V-shaped cross-section. Within the settlement were over 1000 underground storage pits, which were found to contain carbonized grains such as rice and wheat, as well as seeds such as yew, peach, and chestnut, as well as bones of wild boar, Sitka deer, Japanese raccoon dog, and whales, as well as red sea bream, and clams, including abalone. This indicates that the settlement was based almost equally on farming and fishing. More than 2,000 earthenware items, including large pots, earthen weights, spindle wheels and human-faced figurines were found. The stone tools included agricultural tools, weapons, fishing tools, and accessories. Metal utensils included sickles and knives. The settlement appeared to have been at its peak in the early Yayoi period, and to have declined in the middle Yayoi period, although remains from the Kofun period (including one zenpōkōenfun keyhole-shaped burial mound and stone sarcophagi), Heian period, Kamakura period and the Muromachi period indicated that the site continued to be in continuous use into the premodern period.

In 1963, Hisagoya, a company making molds for die casting acquired the mining rights for the silica sand in this location, which it marketed as "Yayoi sand". Due to ongoing archaeological investigations, the company refrained from expanding its operations; however, on discovering that Shimonoseki city was planning to file for National Historic Site status, the company sent in ten bulldozers on the night of March 8, 1969 to completely obliterate the ruins. This completely destroyed the unexplored southern half of the site. Despite a restraining order the following morning, destruction continued, with Shizuo Horie, the president of Hisagoya announcing that it would be impossible to mine the silica sand in the area once it was designated as a cultural property, and as no compensation from the government was expected, he would continue to exercise the company's mining rights. The fact that the price of silica sand had skyrocketed due to disruption of shipment from Vietnam due to the Vietnam War was a major factor. On March 11, the government acted with unprecedented haste and proclaimed the site as a National Historic Site. Hisagoya filed lawsuits in June 1963 seeking to cancel the designation. This lawsuit was not settled until 1981.。

== Gallery ==
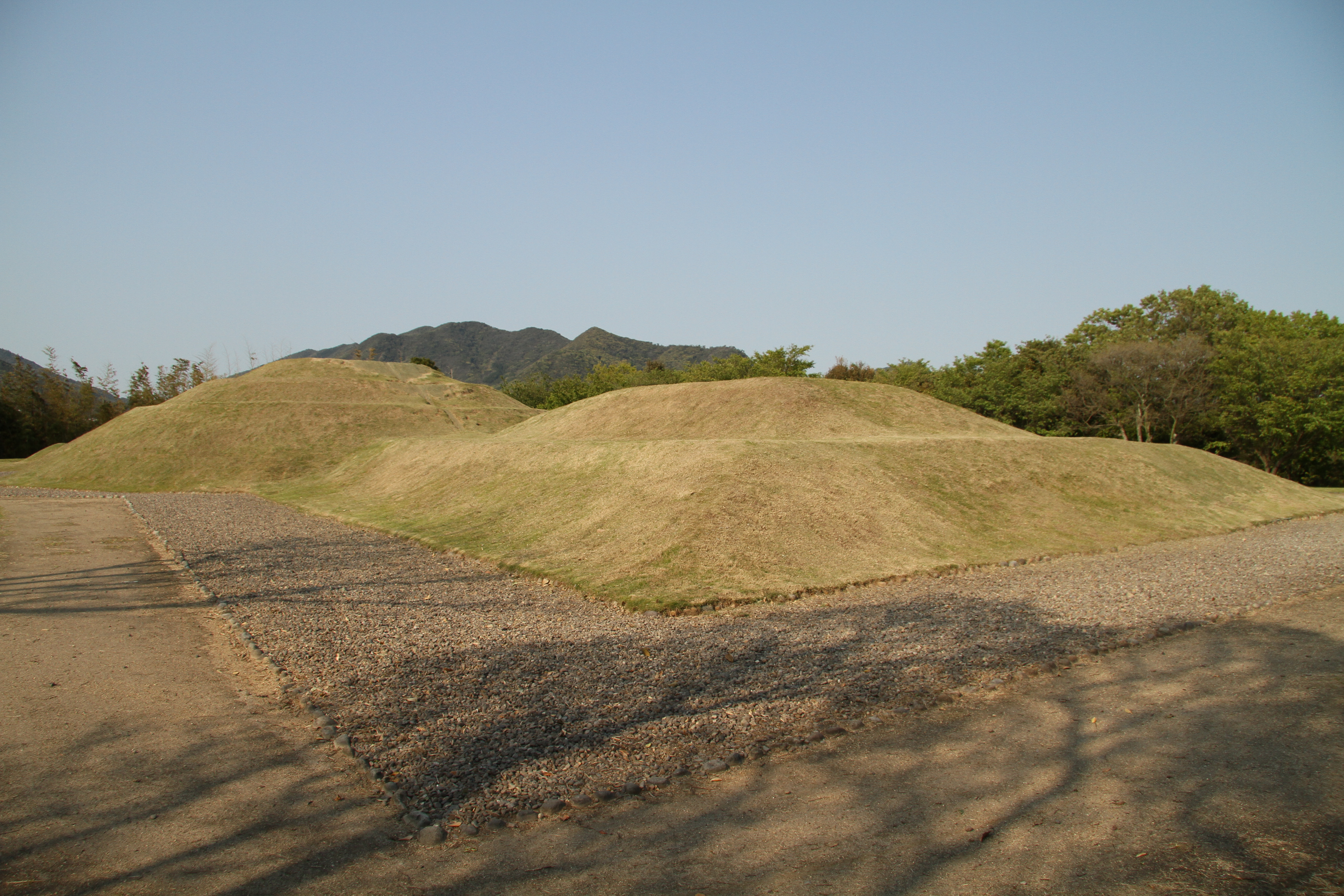
Wakamiya No.1 Kofun, keyhole-shaped burial mound

Yayoi period burial mound traces

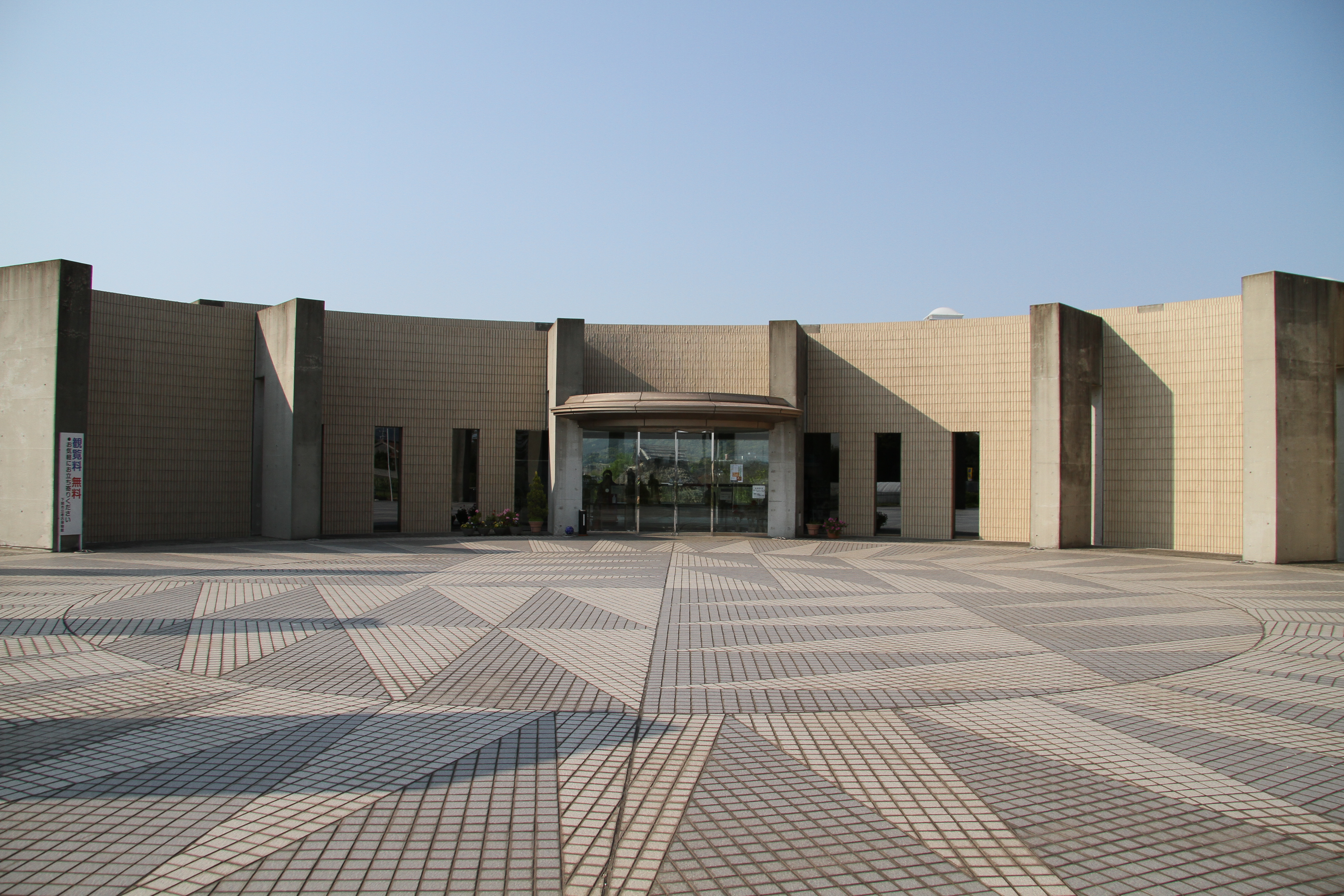
Shimonoseki City Archaeological Museum

The adjacent Shimonoseki City Archaeological Museum not only exhibits excavated artifacts, but also holds regular general education courses and workshops on how to make clay flutes and magatama. The site is about a five-minute walk from Kajikuri-Gōdaichi Station on the JR West San'in Main Line.

== See also ==
- List of Historic Sites of Japan (Yamaguchi)
