= Hoichi the Earless =

Figure in Japanese folklore

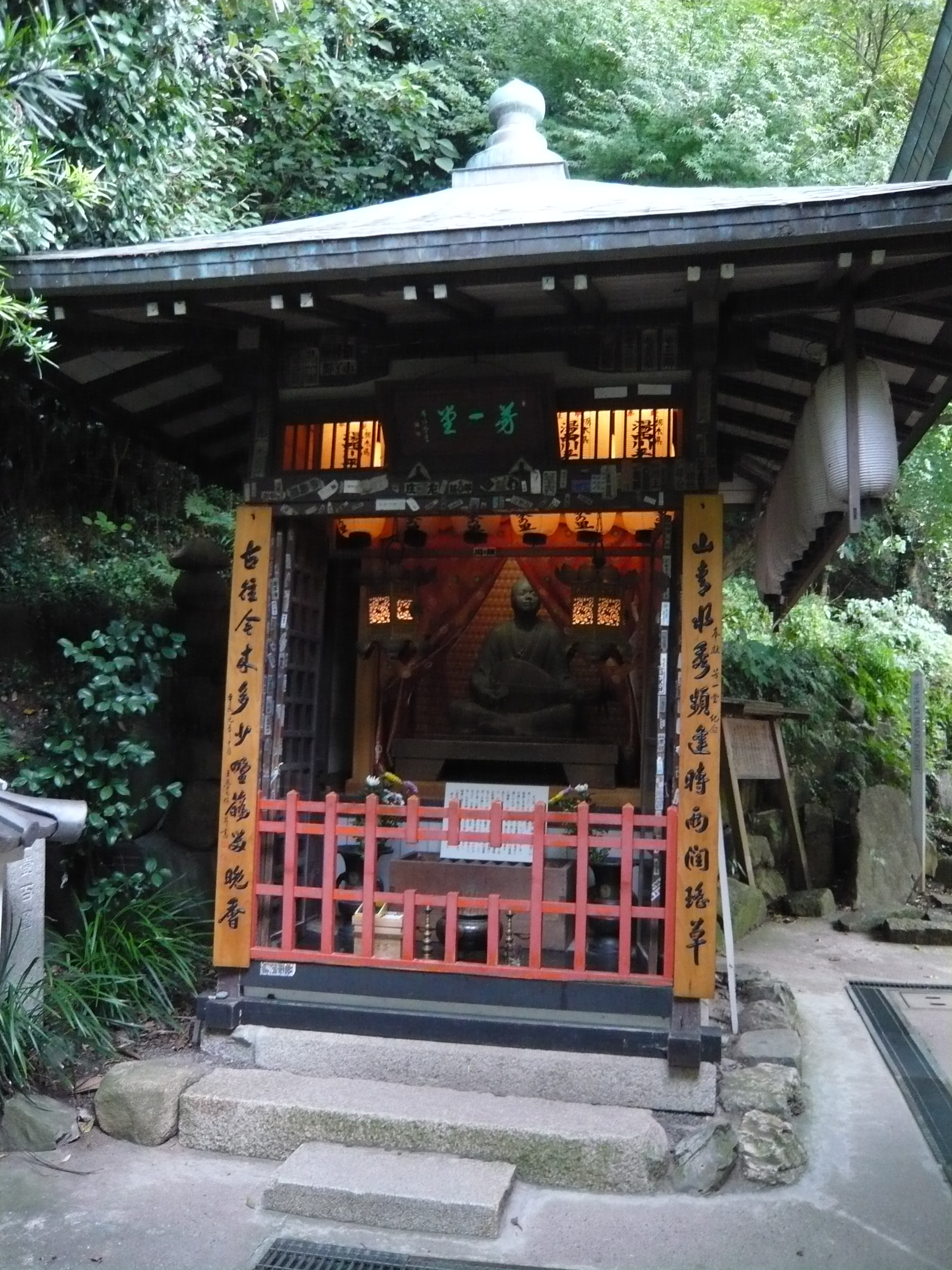
Hōichi-dō (Hōichi's shrine) in Akama Shrine

Hoichi the Earless (耳なし芳一, Mimi-nashi Hōichi) is the name of a well-known figure from Japanese folklore. His story is well known in Japan, and the best-known English translation first appeared in the book Kwaidan: Stories and Studies of Strange Things by Lafcadio Hearn.

A version of this story appears in the film Kwaidan, as well as the play The Dream of a Summer Day, which are both based on Hearn's work.

The source text Hearn used has been identified as the work of Isseki Sanjin (一夕散人), entitled "The Secret Biwa Music that Caused the Yurei to Lament" (琵琶秘曲泣幽霊, Biwa no hikyoku yūrei wo kanashimu), in the series Gayū kidan (臥遊奇談), vol. 2, (pub. 1782).

== Legend summary ==
According to legend, Hoichi was a blind minstrel (or biwa hōshi) with an amazing gift for the biwa (a loquat-shaped Japanese lute). He was particularly good at performing The Tale of the Heike, an epic describing the fall of Emperor Antoku, who is buried at Amidaji Temple. His performances were so wonderful that "even the goblins could not refrain from tears". Despite his talents, Hoichi was very poor and was forced to live at Amidaji Temple under the care of a friendly priest.

As the story goes, Hoichi was approached late one night by a gruff samurai who demanded that the minstrel play for his lord without the priest's knowledge. The retainer led the blind Hoichi into what appeared to be the home of some powerful daimyō, where a performance of The Tale of the Heike was requested. Hoichi's performance was met by high praise and moved his audience to tears, and he was asked to return the next evening for a follow-up recital. Before the retainer returned him to his temple, Hoichi was told that the nobleman for whom he had been playing was traveling incognito and was warned not to speak of the evening's events.

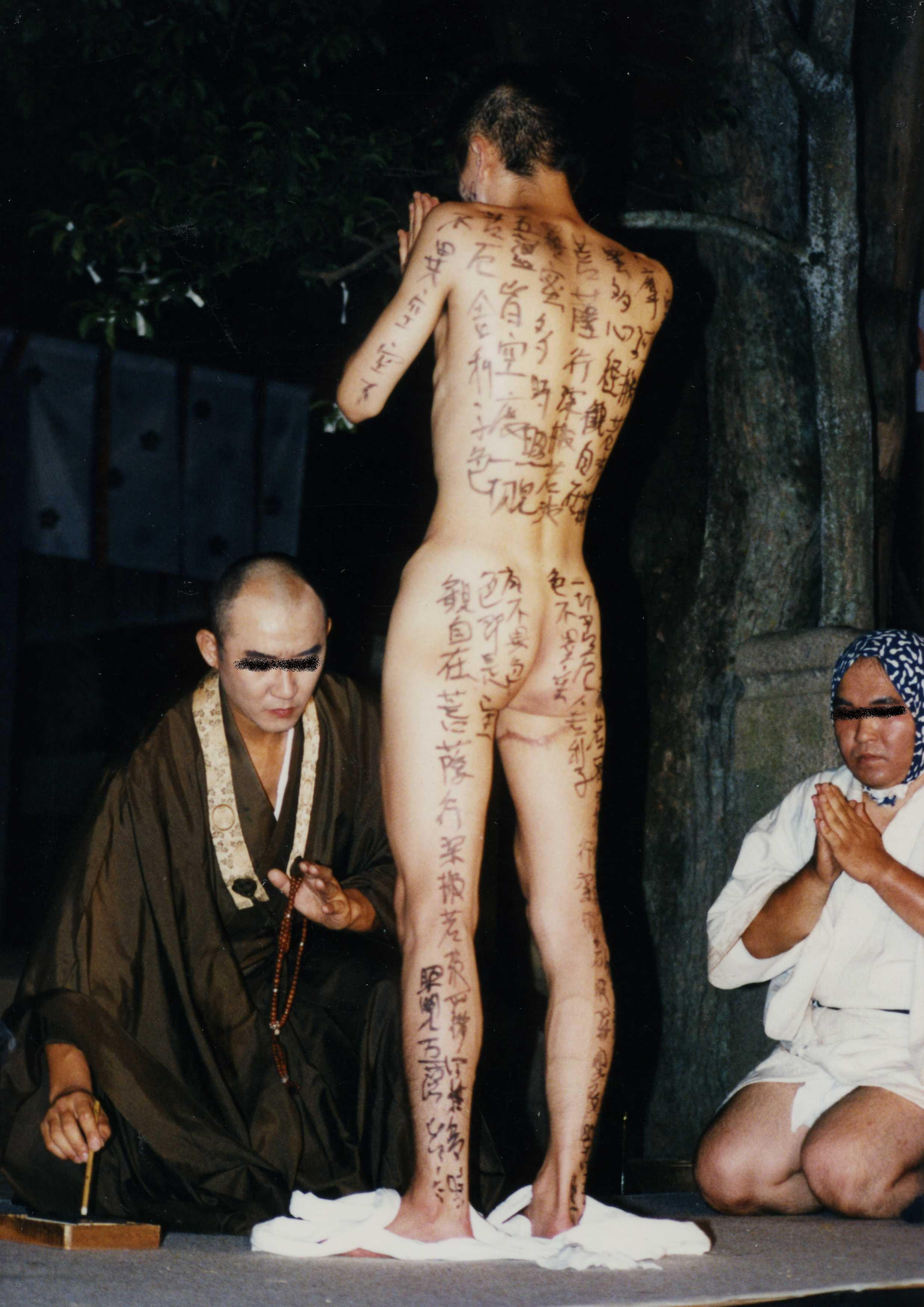
Play of Hoichi the Earless Kobe City Suma temple

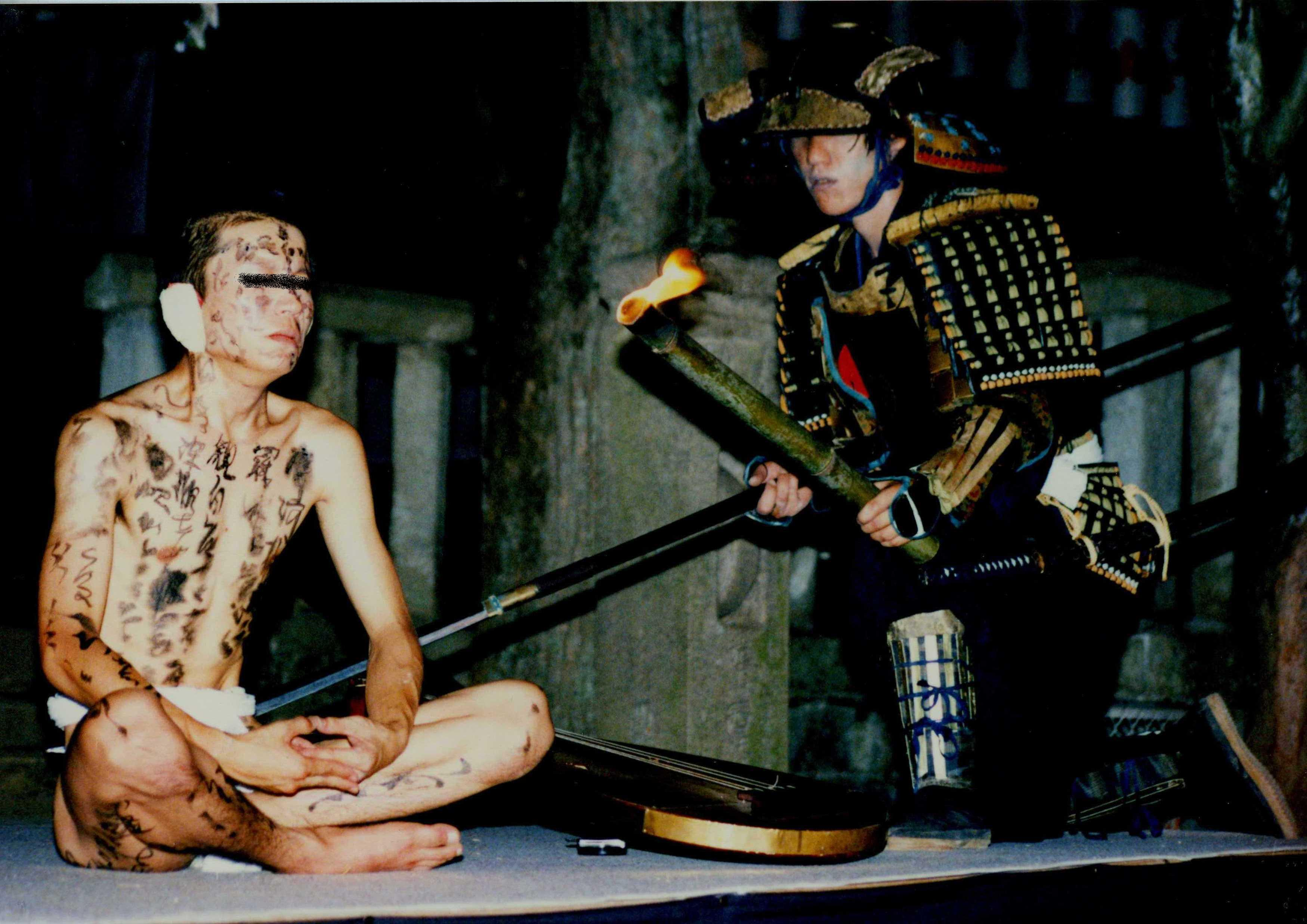
Play of Hoichi the Earless Kobe City Suma temple

The following evening, the samurai returned to Hoichi's quarters and led him back to the nobleman. However, this time Hoichi's absence was discovered by the priest. The priest then had searchers sent to find Hoichi; he was eventually found playing his biwa furiously in the middle of the Amidaji cemetery. When they dragged him back to the temple, Hoichi explained the previous night's events to the priest.

Realizing that Hoichi had been bewitched by ghosts, the priest vowed to save his friend from further trickery. He painted Hoichi's body with the kanji characters of the Heart Sūtra for protection and instructed him to remain silent and motionless when he is called upon again by his ghostly audience. That evening the samurai called for Hoichi as before and was angered when he received no response. The retainer, revealed to be a wandering spirit, approached Hoichi but was unable to see anything but his ears. The sutra had rendered the rest of Hoichi's body invisible. Attempting to comply with his orders, the samurai ripped Hoichi's ears off as proof that they had been the only portion of the lute player that he could see.

After the ghostly retainer had left, Hoichi was still too frightened to react, despite the blood gushing from the wounds on his head. When the priest returned, he realized in dismay that he had neglected to write the sutra on Hoichi's ears, which had left them vulnerable to the spirit. Despite his injury, Hoichi's ordeal had freed him from the spirit's power, and he went on to recover from his wounds and become a famous musician.

== Setting and variants ==
The vintage text also names Hōichi as the biwa strumming protagonist, and is set in Akama-seki, Chōshū, at the Buddhist temple named Amidaji (all as in Hearn's version). This locale is identifiable as today's Akama Shrine in Shimonoseki, Yamaguchi.

A variant version collected by folklorists is called Mimikiri Dan'ichi (「耳切り団一」, "Ear-cut Danichi"), taken down from Tokushima Prefecture (near Dannoura), and is mentioned by Kunio Yanagita in Hitotsume kozō sono ta (『一つ目小僧その他』).

== Cultural references ==
Hoichi is often referenced in the book Blood Ninja and Blood Ninja 2, as the character Shusaku's choice to paint himself in order to hide from other vampires is compared to the tale of Hoichi.

== In popular culture ==
A fictionalized version of this tale serves as an episode of the 2003 series 100 Tales of Horror (怪談百物語, Kaidan Hyaku Monogatari). In the particular episode, Hoichi's background was revised as having been originally a foot-soldier of the Heike, tasked to guard one of their princesses—one he eventually kills due to being maltreated. Afterwards, he presents the princess's head to a Genji commander, who rebukes him for betraying his charge and eventually blinding him as punishment. As his atonement, he began to perform The Tale of the Heike. The storyline follows the original elements of the folktale—with the twist being the ghostly court he performs to is eventually revealed to be his former Heike compatriots, and who finally takes his ears as a final act of spite before letting him go.

His reflection is also used by the yokai "Biwa Boku-boku" (a haunted biwa) in the video game Nioh and its sequel.

In the video game Chulip, Monk Hōichi is a monk character who appears near a ghostly graveyard. His appearance, including the writing on his body, resemble depictions associated with the folklore figure.

== See also ==
- Kwaidan (film)
- Japanese mythology
- Heart Sutra
