= Akama Shrine =

Shinto shrine in Yamaguchi Prefecture, Japan

Akama Shrine 赤間神宮
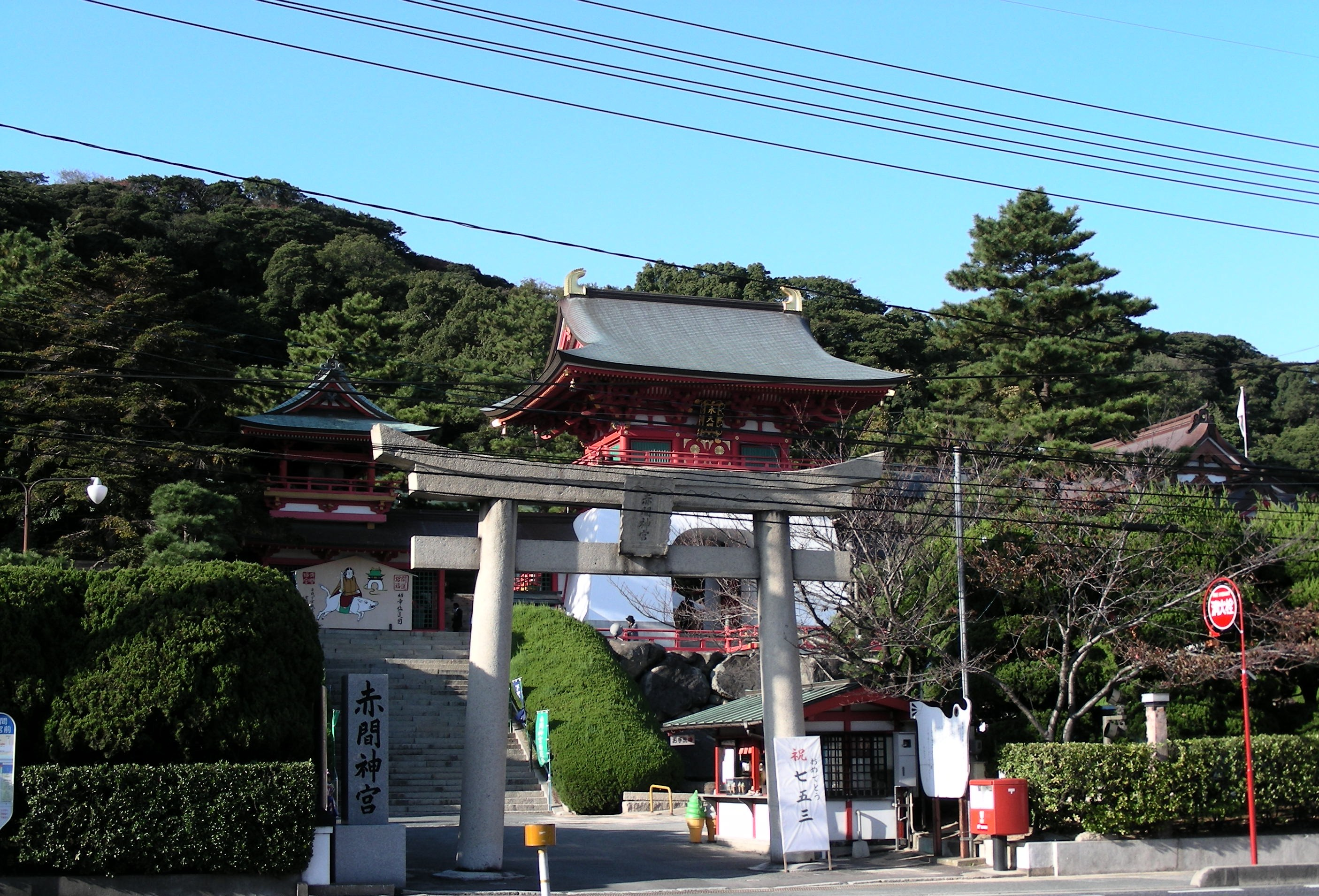
- Torii of Akama Shrine

- Location within Japan

Religion
- Affiliation: Shinto
- Deity: Emperor Antoku
- Type: Imperial Shrine

Location
- Location: 4-1, Amidaiji-chō; Shimonoseki, Yamaguchi 750-0003
- Coordinates: 33°57′35″N 130°56′54.5″E

Architecture
- Established: 1191

Website
- www.tiki.ne.jp/~akama-jingu/(in Japanese)

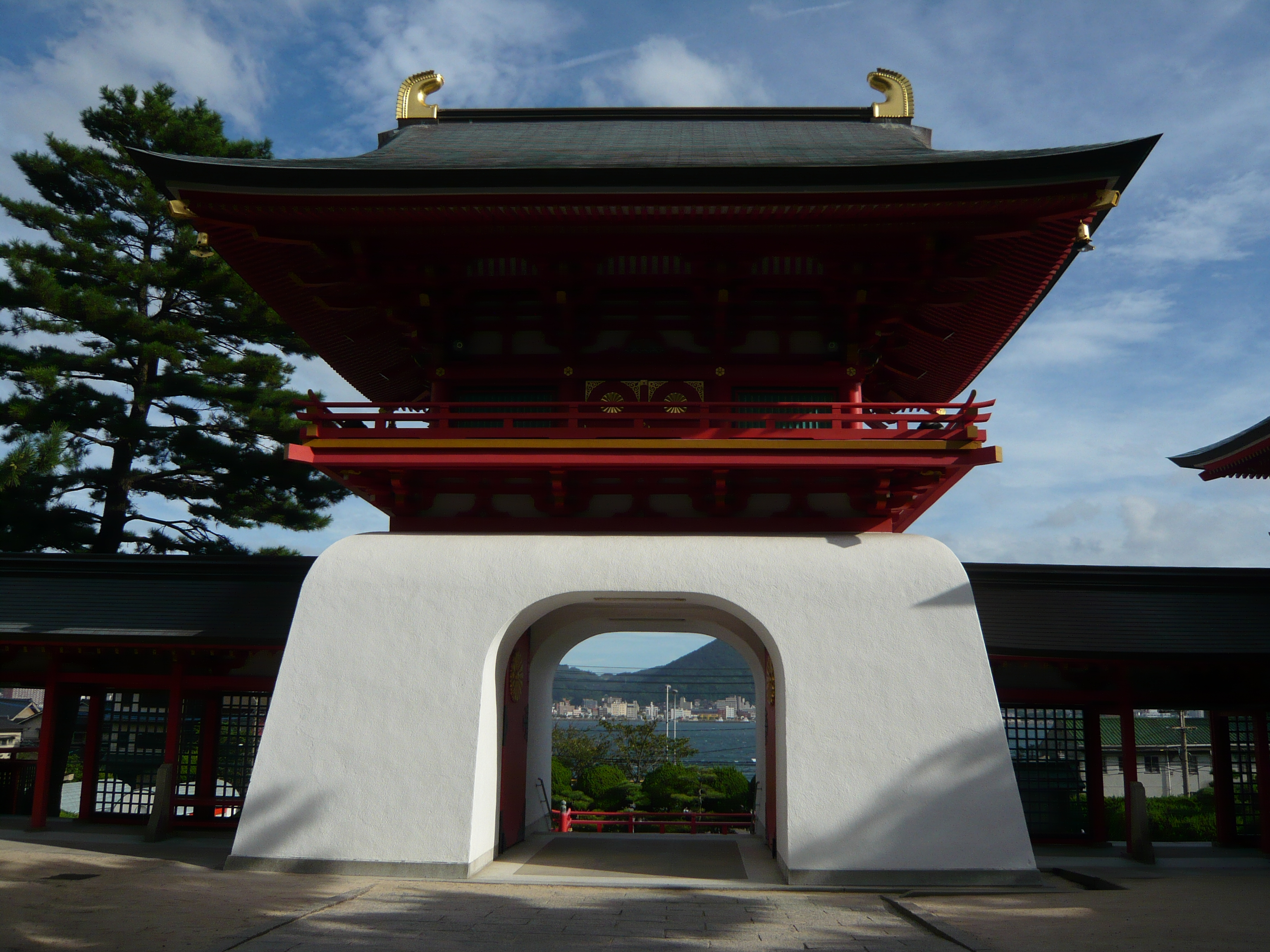
Suiten mon, main gate of the shrine

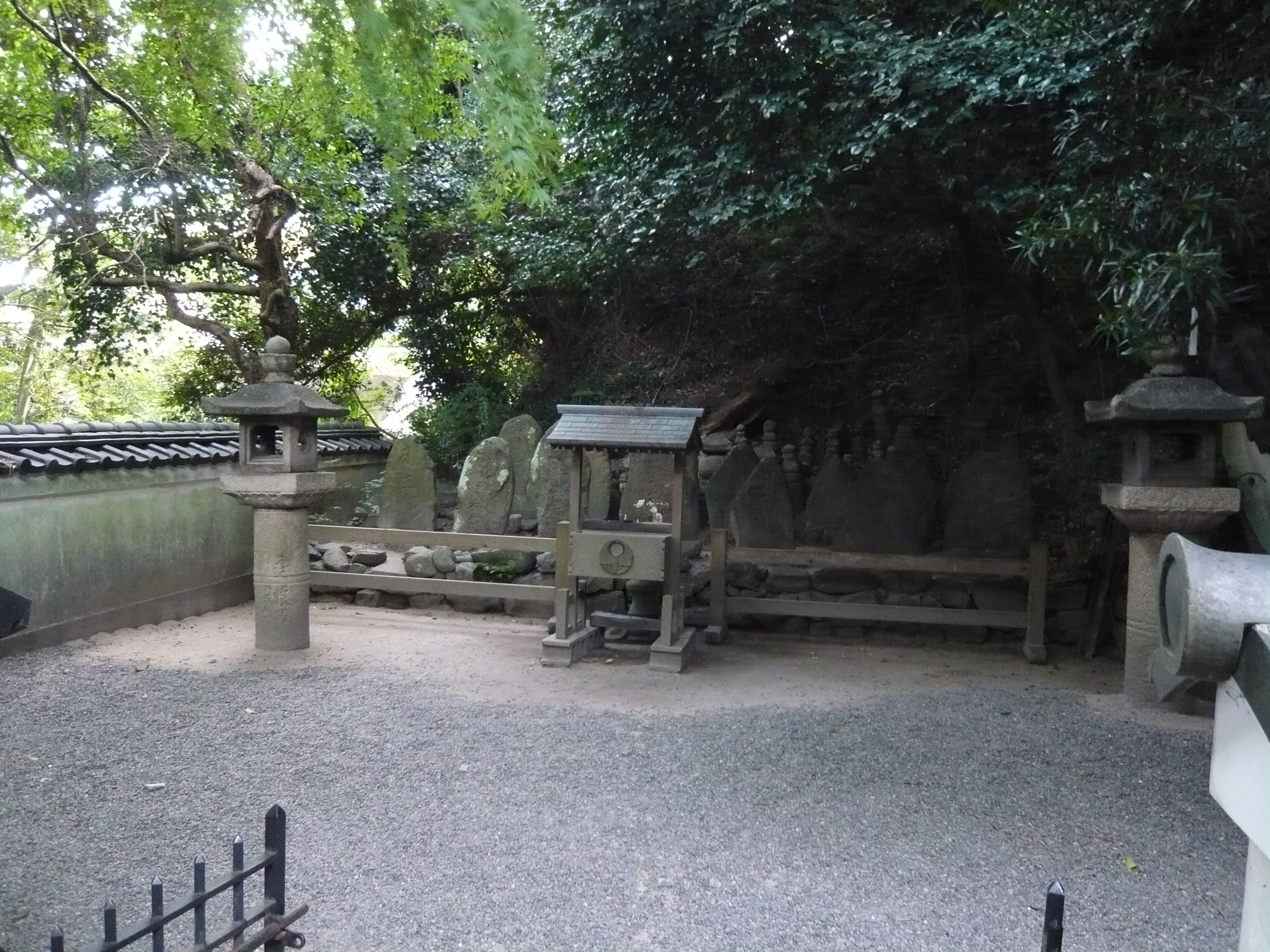
Nanamori-zuka, tomb of Taira clan warriors

Akama Shrine (赤間神宮, Akama Jingū) is a Shinto shrine in Shimonoseki, Yamaguchi Prefecture, Japan. It is dedicated to the child Emperor Antoku, who died in the Battle of Dan-no-ura (aka Dannoura), which occurred nearby in 1185. This battle was important in the history of Japan because it brought an end to Genpei War in which the Minamoto clan defeated the rival Taira clan, and ended the Taira bid for control of Japan. The modern shrine is built on the grounds of the former Buddhist Amidaji Temple and its adjoining cemetery.

The shrine is situated on the waterfront of the Kanmon Strait, between the centre of Shimonoseki and the tourist restaurants of Karato, Kanmon Wharf. The bright red main gate makes it a very visible sight.

== Description ==
The colours and style of the gate are inspired by Ryūgū-jō, according to the Shimonoseki Tourist Guidebook published by the Shimonoseki City Tourism Department. This source states that Antoku's grandmother, Nii-no-Ama, who drowned with Antoku, wished for their palace to be created underwater as she jumped into the sea. Ryūgū-jō is a mythical underwater palace, belonging to the dragon god of the sea. In the Tale of Heike, Nii-no-Ama told Antoku, before jumping, that they would go to an underwater palace, without referring to Ryūgū-jō. Then, Antoku's mother (Kenreimon-In, aka Taira no Tokuko) had a dream, in which they were living in Ryūgū-jō.

Inside, in the Hoichi Hall, is a statue of Hoichi the Earless, one of the characters in a traditional ghost story which was made known in the west by Lafcadio Hearn.

The grounds also contain the Nanamori-zuka (seven mounds), which represent the Heike warriors also lost in the Battle of Dan-no-Ura.

== Kanpei-sha ==
In 1871, the Kanpei-sha (官幣社) identified the hierarchy of government-supported shrines most closely associated with the Imperial family. The kampeisha were shrines venerated by the imperial family. This category encompasses those sanctuaries enshrining emperors, imperial family members, or meritorious retainers of the Imperial family. Up through 1940, the mid-range of ranked Imperial shrines or Kanpei-chūsha (官幣中社) included the shrine; and it was then known as Akama-gū In 1940, Akama's status was changed Kanpei-taisha (官幣大社), which is the highest rank; and since then, it has been known as Akama jingū.

== See also ==
- List of Jingū
- Modern system of ranked Shinto Shrines
