= Kajikuri-Gōdaichi Station =

Railway station in Shimonoseki, Yamaguchi Prefecture, Japan

Kajikuri-Gōdaichi Station 梶栗郷台地駅
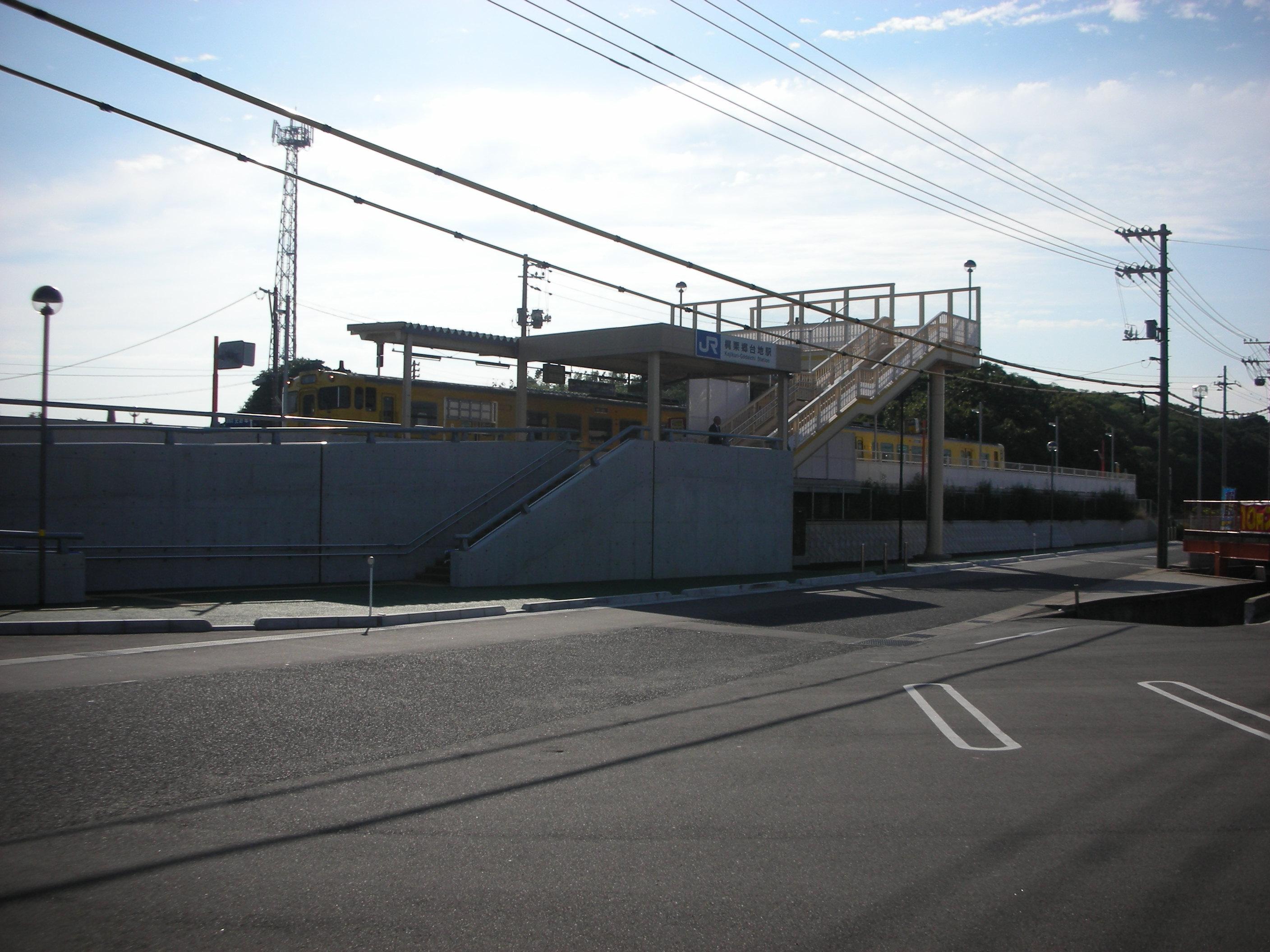
- Kajikuri-Gōdaichi Station in December 2018

General information
- Location: 3-959-3 Ayaragi-shimmachi, Shimonoseki-shi, Yamaguchi-ken 751-0865; Japan
- Coordinates: 34°0′50.61″N 130°55′24.9″E
- Owner: West Japan Railway Company
- Operator: West Japan Railway Company
- Line: San'in Main Line
- Distance: 669.6 km (416.1 miles) from Kyoto
- Platforms: 1 side platform
- Tracks: 1
- Connections: Bus stop

Other information
- Status: Unstaffed
- Website: Official website

History
- Opened: 15 March 2008; 18 years ago

Passengers
- FY2020: 253

Services
Preceding station	JR West	Following station
Ayaragi towards Shimonoseki	San'in Main Line E Local Rapid	Yasuoka towards Masuda
Location
- Location within Yamaguchi Prefecture Location within Japan

Kajikuri-Gōdaichi Station (梶栗郷台地駅, Kajikuri-Gōdaichi eki) is a passenger railway station located in the city of Shimonoseki, Yamaguchi Prefecture, Japan. It is operated by the West Japan Railway Company (JR West).

== Lines ==
Kajikuri-Gōdaichi Station is served by the JR West San'in Main Line, and is located 669.6 kilometers from the terminus of the line at Kyoto.

== Station layout ==
The station consists of one ground-level side platform serving a single bi-directional track. The statin building is located on the right side of the track when facing in the direction of Hatabu. the station is unattended.

== History ==
Kajikuri-Gōdaichi Station was opened on 15 March 2008.

== Passenger statistics ==
In fiscal 2020, the station was used by an average of 253 passengers daily.

== Surrounding area ==
- Shimonoseki City Archaeological Museum
- Ayaragigō Site
- Shimonoseki North Sports Park - Shimonoseki Stadium
- Japan National Route 191 (Shimonoseki North Bypass)

== See also ==
- List of railway stations in Japan
