= Kawatana-Onsen Station =

Railway station in Shimonoseki, Yamaguchi Prefecture, Japan

Kawatana-Onsen Station 川棚温泉駅
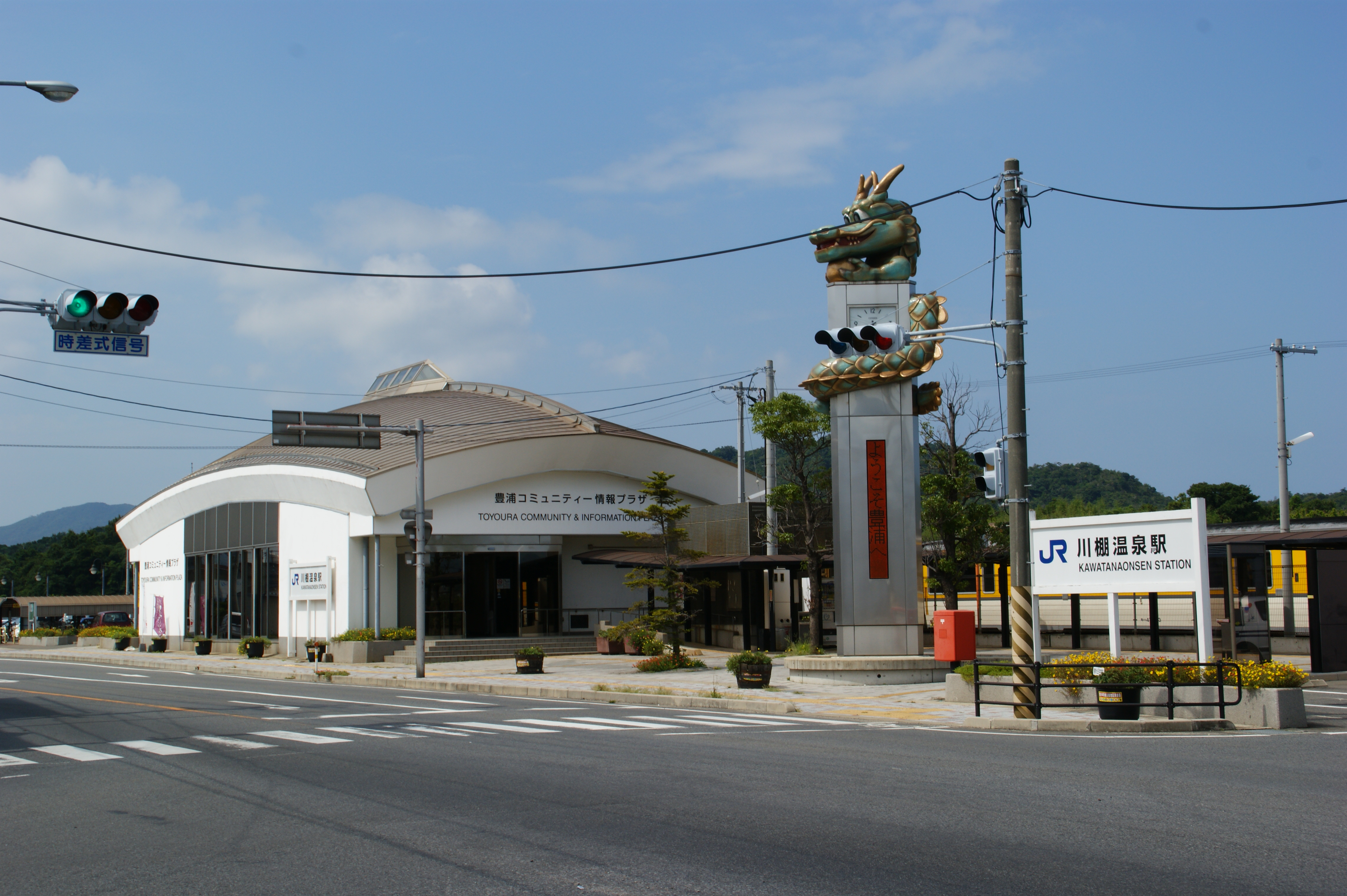
- Kawatana-Onsen Station Building & Plaza, September 2008

General information
- Location: 6964, Toyoura-cho Kawatana Shimonoseki-shi, Yamaguchi-ken 759-6301; Japan
- Coordinates: 34°8′47.06″N 130°55′20.71″E
- Owner: West Japan Railway Company
- Operator: West Japan Railway Company
- Line: San'in Main Line
- Distance: 652.9 km (405.7 miles) from Kyoto
- Platforms: 1 side platform
- Tracks: 1
- Connections: Bus stop

Other information
- Status: Unstaffed
- Website: Official website

History
- Opened: 22 April 1914; 112 years ago

Passengers
- FY2020: 316

Services
Preceding station	JR West	Following station
Kuroimura towards Shimonoseki	San'in Main Line E Local Rapid	Kogushi towards Masuda
Location
- Location within Yamaguchi Prefecture Location within Japan

Kawatana-Onsen Station (川棚温泉駅, Kawatana-Onsen-eki) is a passenger railway station located in the city of Shimonoseki, Yamaguchi Prefecture, Japan. It is operated by the West Japan Railway Company (JR West).

== Lines ==
Kawatana-Onsen Station is served by the JR West San'in Main Line, and is located 652.9 kilometers from the terminus of the line at Kyoto.

== Station layout ==
The station consists of one ground-level side platform serving a single bi-directional track. The station formerly had a second opposed side platform, the remnants of which are now used as a flowerbed. The station is unattended.

== History ==
Kawatana-Onsen Station was opened on 22 April 1914 on the Chōshū Railway, which was railway nationalized in 1925. The line was renamed the San'in Main Line in 1933. With the privatization of the Japan National Railway (JNR) on 1 April 1987, the station came under the aegis of the West Japan railway Company (JR West).

== Passenger statistics ==
In fiscal 2020, the station was used by an average of 316 passengers daily.

== Surrounding area ==
The station building side is an urban area, but the other side is a field. The city's general branch office (former Toyoura town hall) is located right next to the station, but other administrative agencies in the Toyoura area are located around the neighboring Ogushi station. Japan National Route 191 passes in front of the station. Kawatana Onsen, after which the station is named, is about 1.8 kilometers away.

== See also ==
- List of railway stations in Japan
