= Karato =

Area in Shimonoseki, Yamaguchi, Japan

Coordinates: 33°57′24″N 130°56′32.7″E

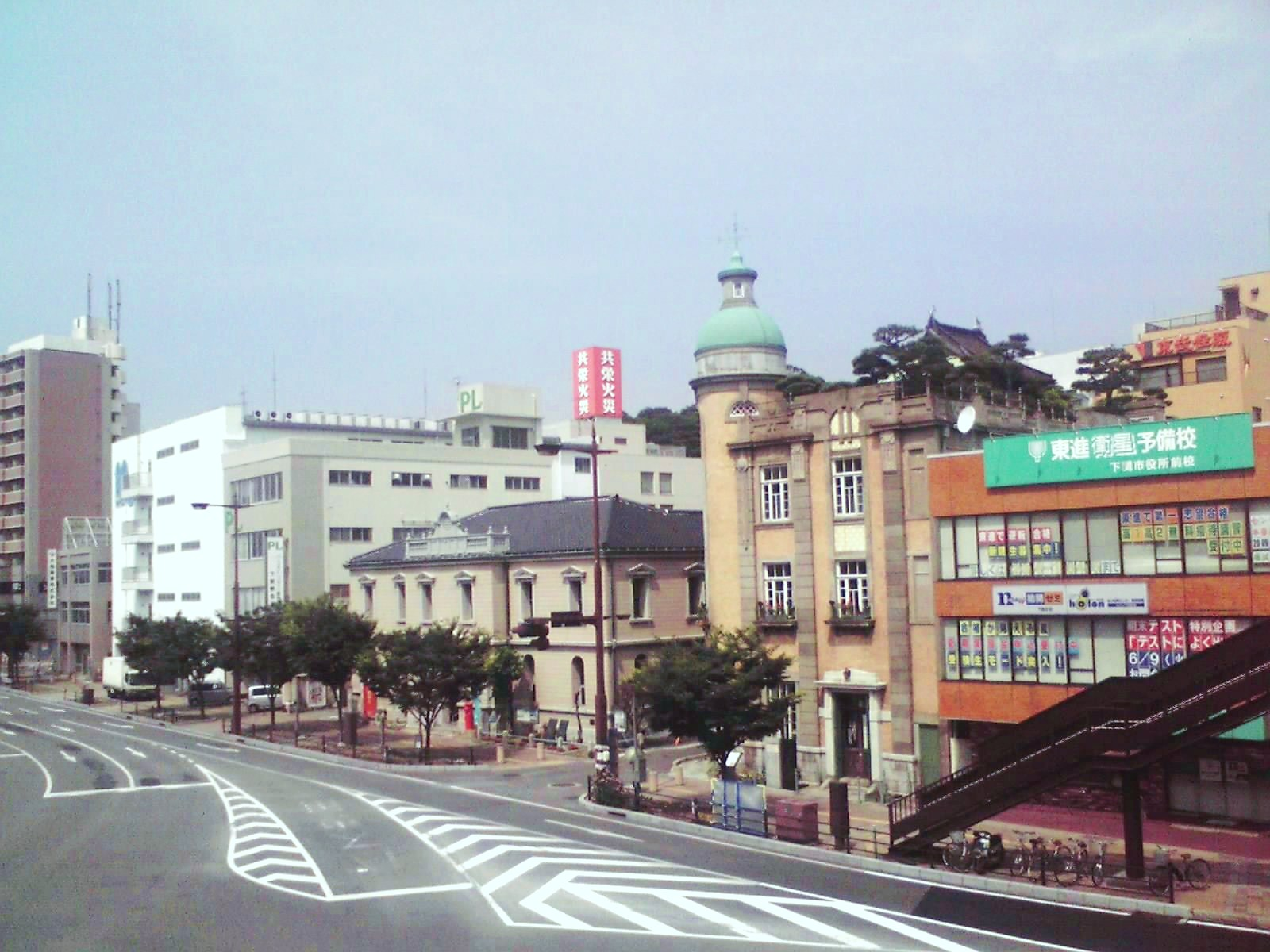
Karato area

Karato (唐戸) is the downtown area of the city of Shimonoseki, Japan. Located in Yamaguchi Prefecture, it is known for its fish market.

== Main sightseeing spots and institutions ==
=== Sightseeing ===
- Kaikyokan (Aquarium)
- Mount Hino (268.2 m)
- Karato Market (fresh fish shop etc.)
- Former British Consulate (旧下関英国領事館) (built in 1906)
- Former Akita Company Building (built in 1915): Shimonoseki Tour Information Center
- Nabe-cho Post Office (下関南部町郵便局) (built in 1900)
- Akama Shrine (built in 1191)
- Kameyama Hachiman Shrine (built in 859)
- Kanmon Straits (Kanmonkyo Bridge)
- Dan-no-ura (location of Battle of Dan-no-ura)
- Entrance to the Kanmon Roadway Tunnel
- Hai! Karato Yokocho, amusement park

=== Others ===
- Shimonoseki City Hall
- Arcaport development area

== Festivals ==
- Shimonoseki Kaikyo Festival (May)
- Kanmon Kaikyo Fireworks Festival (August)
- Shimonoseki Bakan Festival (August)
- Shimonoseki Kaikyo Marathon (November)

== Transportation ==
=== Ferries ===
- The Kanpu ferry from Shimonoseki Port International Terminal to Busan in South Korea regularly.
- The Orient ferry from Shimonoseki Port International Terminal to Qingdao in China regularly.
- The Orient ferry from Shimonoseki Port International Terminal to Shanghai in China regularly.

=== Trains ===
- Nearby stations
  - Shimonoseki Station (Sanyō Main Line)
- Nearby Shinkansen stations
  - Shin-Shimonoseki Station (Sanyō Shinkansen)

=== Buses ===
Sanden Kotsu runs frequent local buses to the Karato area.

== See also ==
- Shimonoseki
- Shimonoseki Station
