= Baiko Gakuin University Women's Junior College =

Baiko Gakuin University Women’s Junior College
- 梅光学院大学女子短期大学部
- Former names: Baiko Jo Gakuin University Junior College梅光女学院短期大学 (Baiko Jo Gakuin Tanki Daigaku); Baiko Jo Gakuin University Junior College梅光女学院大学短期大学部 (Baiko Jo Gakuin Daigaku Tanki Daigaku)
- Type: Private
- Active: 1964–2006
- Head: Shinji Nakano
- Academic staff: Language Communication
- Location: Shimonoseki, Yamaguchi, Chugoku, Japan

Baiko Gakuin University Women’s Junior College (梅光学院大学女子短期大学部, Baiko Gakuin Daigaku Joshi Tanki Daigaku) was a junior college in Shimonoseki Yamaguchi Prefecture, Japan, and was part of the Baiko Gakuin network.

- The Junior College was founded in 1964 as Baiko Jo Gakuin University Junior College梅光女学院短期大学 (Baiko Jo Gakuin Tanki Daigaku).
- In 1975 Its name was changed to Baiko Jo Gakuin University Junior College梅光女学院大学短期大学部 (Baiko Jo Gakuin Daigaku Tanki Daigaku).
- In 2001 Its name was changed to Baiko Gakuin University Women's Junior College.
- In 2006 The Junior College was closed.
