= Fukue Station =

Railway station in Shimonoseki, Yamaguchi Prefecture, Japan

Fukue Station 福江駅
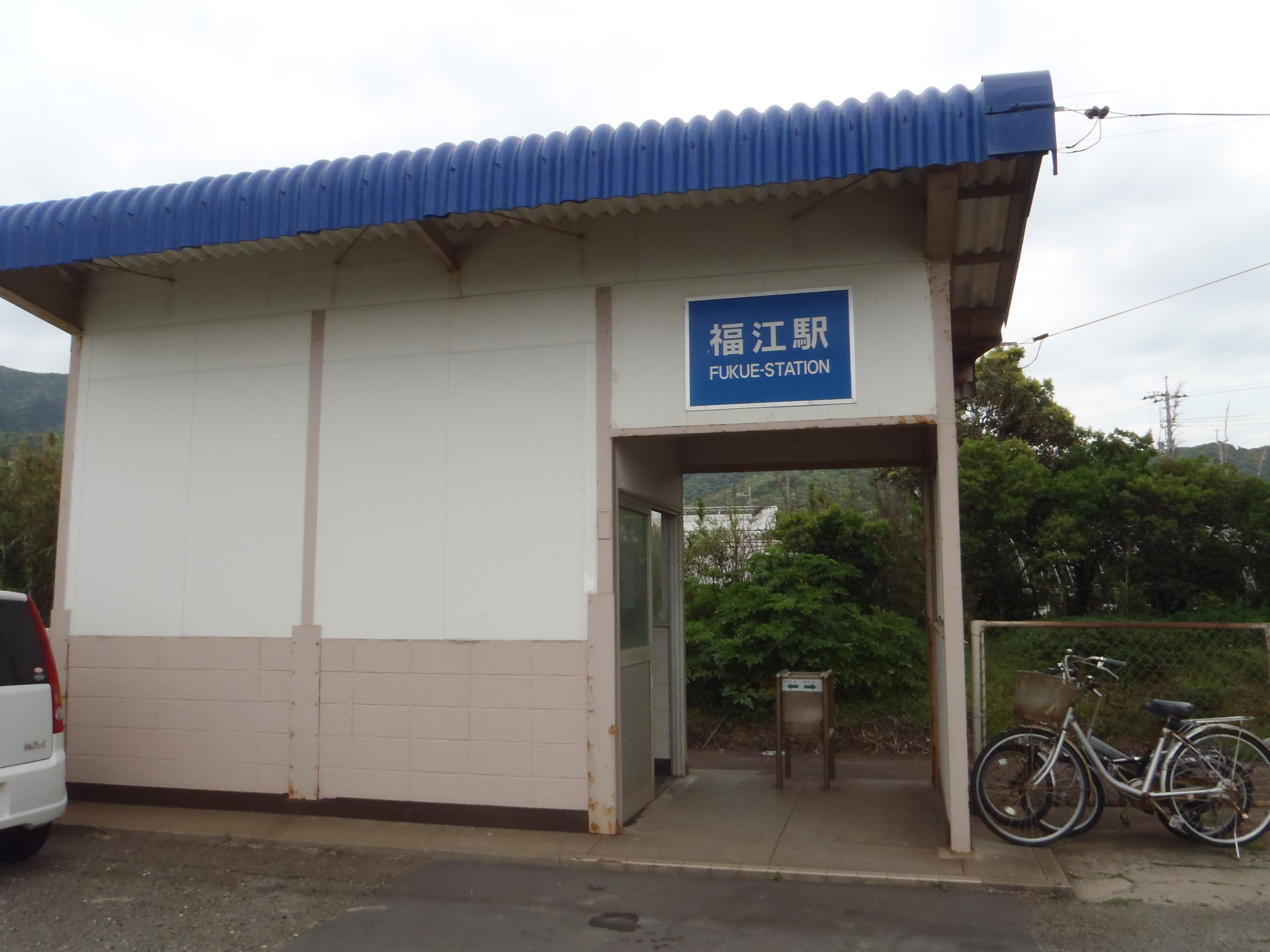
- Fukue Station, May 2011

General information
- Location: 1466 Fukue Hamanohara, Shimonoseki-shi, Yamaguchi-ken 759-6601; Japan
- Coordinates: 34°2′49.25″N 130°54′55.94″E
- Owner: West Japan Railway Company
- Operator: West Japan Railway Company
- Line: San'in Main Line
- Distance: 665.6 km (413.6 miles) from Kyoto
- Platforms: 1 side platform
- Tracks: 1
- Connections: Bus stop

Other information
- Status: Unstaffed
- Website: Official website

History
- Opened: 22 April 1924; 102 years ago

Passengers
- FY2020: 44

Services
Preceding station	JR West	Following station
Yasuoka towards Shimonoseki	San'in Main Line E Local	Yoshimi towards Masuda
Location
- Location within Yamaguchi Prefecture Location within Japan

Fukue Station (福江駅, Fukue eki) is a passenger railway station located in the city of Shimonoseki, Yamaguchi Prefecture, Japan. It is operated by the West Japan Railway Company (JR West).

== Lines ==
Fukue Station is served by the JR West San'in Main Line, and is located 665.6 kilometers from the terminus of the line at Kyoto.

== Station layout ==
The station consists of one ground-level side platform serving a single bi-directional track. The station is unattended.

== History ==
Fukue Station was opened on 22 April 1914 on the Chōshū Railway, which was railway nationalized in 1925. The line was renamed the San'in Main Line in 1933. With the privatization of the Japan National Railway (JNR) on 1 April 1987, the station came under the aegis of the West Japan railway Company (JR West).

== Passenger statistics ==
In fiscal 2020, the station was used by an average of 44 passengers daily.

== Surrounding area ==
- Japan National Route 191
- Japan Maritime Self-Defense Force Shimonoseki Base Fukue Transmitting Station

== See also ==
- List of railway stations in Japan
