= Yoshimi Station =

Railway station in Shimonoseki, Yamaguchi Prefecture, Japan

Yoshimi Station 吉見駅
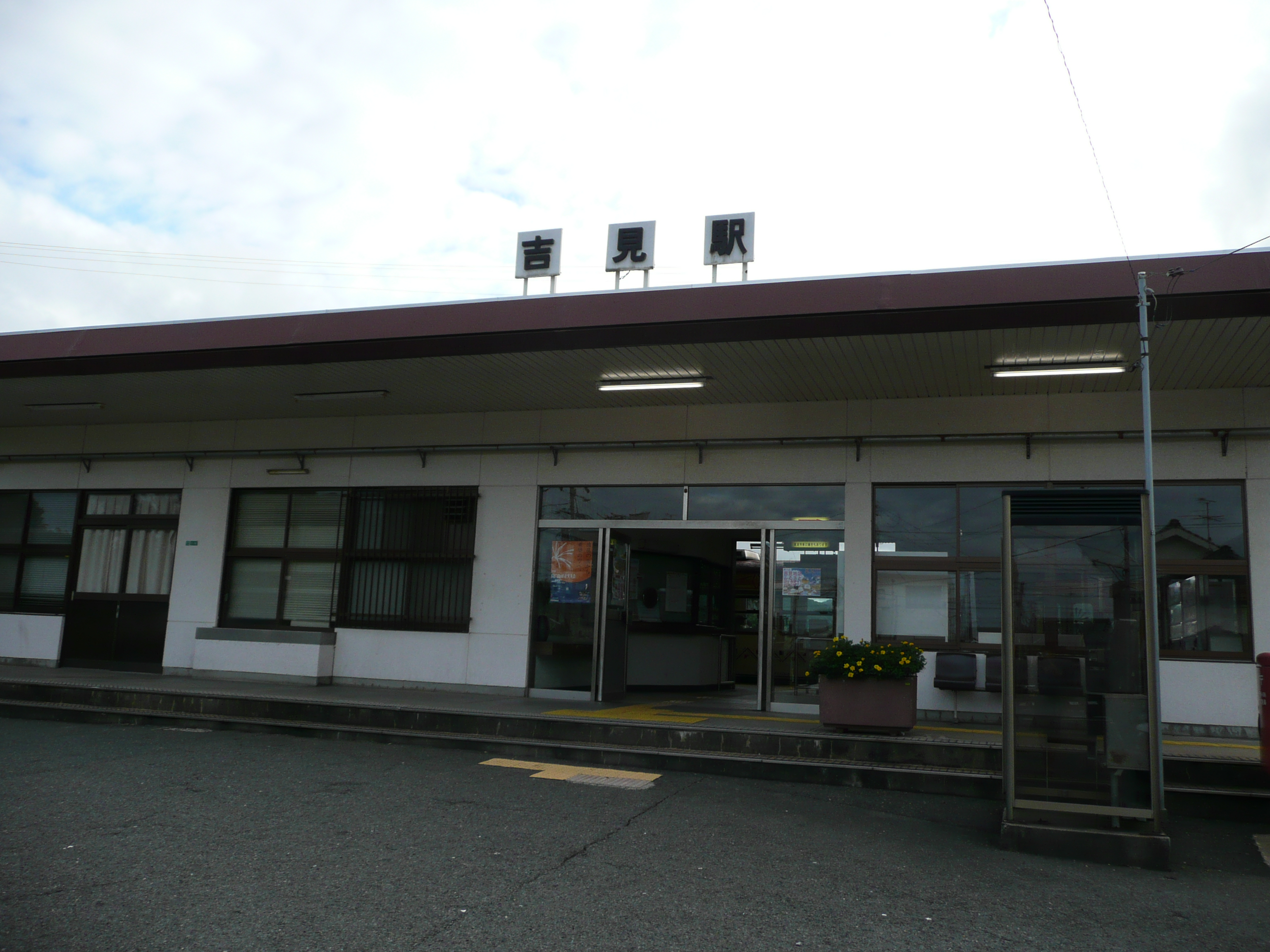
- Yoshimi Station, July 2009

General information
- Location: 1-26, Yoshimihommachi 1-chome, Shimonoseki-shi, Yamaguchi-ken 759-6522; Japan
- Coordinates: 34°4′12.59″N 130°54′11.96″E
- Owner: West Japan Railway Company
- Operator: West Japan Railway Company
- Line: San'in Main Line
- Distance: 662.7 km (411.8 miles) from Kyoto
- Platforms: 2 side platforms
- Tracks: 2
- Connections: Bus stop

Other information
- Status: Unstaffed
- Website: Official website

History
- Opened: 22 April 1924; 102 years ago

Passengers
- FY2020: 387

Services
| Preceding station | JR West | Following station |
|---|---|---|
| Fukue towards Shimonoseki | San'in Main Line E Local Rapid | Umegatō towards Masuda |
Location
- Location within Yamaguchi Prefecture Location within Japan

Yoshimi Station (吉見駅, Yoshimi eki) is a passenger railway station located in the city of Shimonoseki, Yamaguchi Prefecture, Japan. It is operated by the West Japan Railway Company (JR West).

== Lines ==
Yoshimi Station is served by the JR West San'in Main Line, and is located 662.7 kilometers from the terminus of the line at Kyoto.

== Station layout ==
The station consists of two ground-level opposed side platforms connected to the station building by a footbridge. The old freight siding line was connected to the inbound line in the direction of Kyoto, and remained for a long time after the freight handling was discontinued, but was removed around February 2008. A bicycle parking lot is installed above the former freight platform. The station is unattended.

== Platforms ==
| 1 | ■ San'in Main Line | for Kogushi and Nagatoshi |
| 2 | ■ San'in Main Line | for Shimonoseki |

== History ==
Yoshimi Station was opened on 22 April 1914 on the Chōshū Railway, which was railway nationalized in 1925. The line was renamed the San'in Main Line in 1933. With the privatization of the Japan National Railway (JNR) on 1 April 1987, the station came under the aegis of the West Japan railway Company (JR West).

== Passenger statistics ==
In fiscal 2020, the station was used by an average of 387 passengers daily.

== Surrounding area ==
- Yoshimi Port (Yoshimi Fishing Port), where ferries to Futaijima Island depart. Route 191 passes in front of the station.
- Japan National Route 191
- Shimonoseki Municipal Yoshimi Junior High School
- Shimonoseki Municipal Yoshimi Elementary School
- Japan Maritime Self-Defense Force Shimonoseki Base

== See also ==
- List of railway stations in Japan
