= Kuroimura Station =

Railway station in Shimonoseki, Yamaguchi Prefecture, Japan

Kuroimura Station 黒井村駅
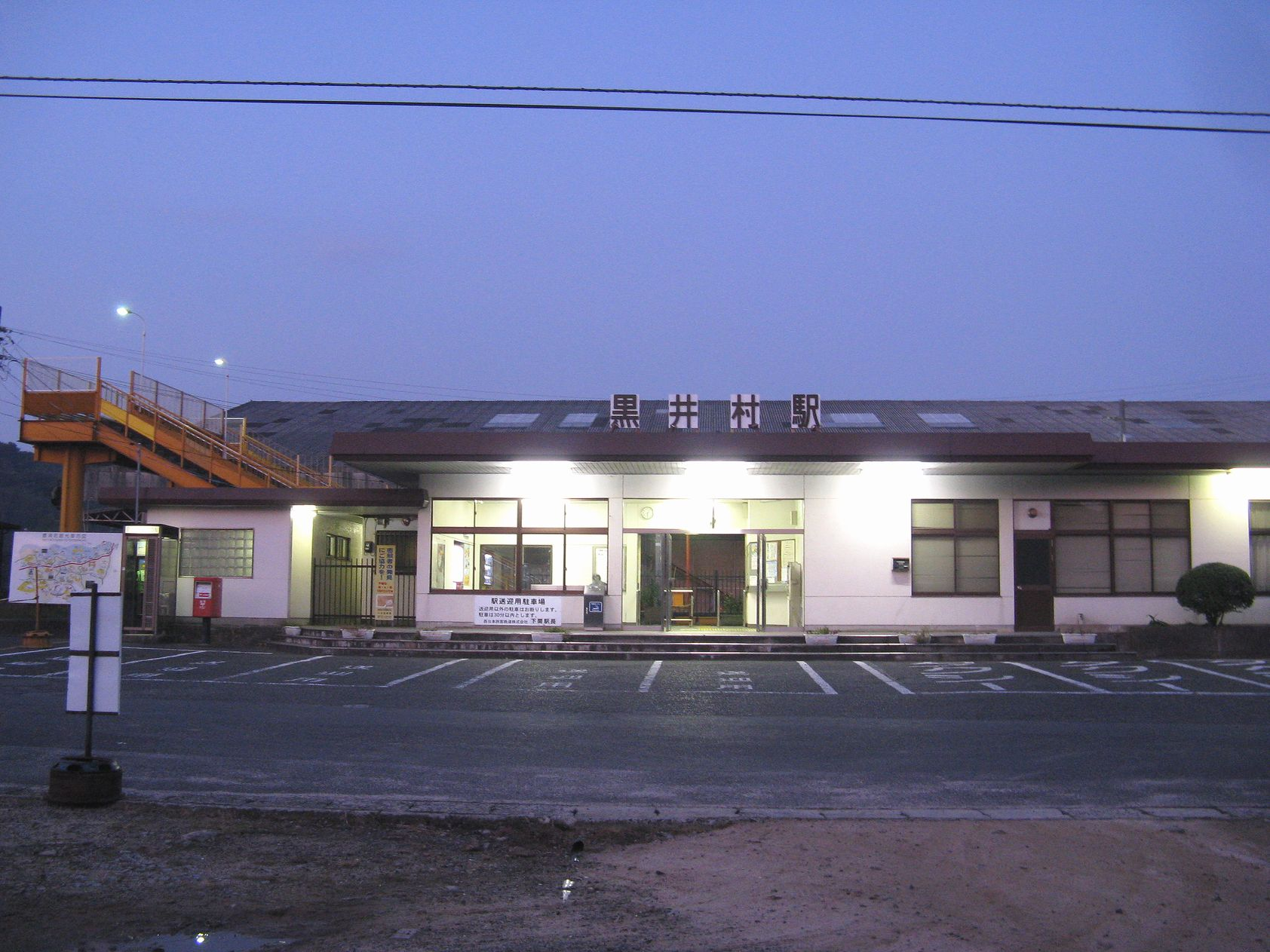
- Kuroimura Station in October 2009

General information
- Location: 2296, Toyoura-cho Kuroi, Shimonoseki-shi, Yamaguchi-ken 759-6312; Japan
- Coordinates: 34°7′39.37″N 130°54′44.36″E
- Owner: West Japan Railway Company
- Operator: West Japan Railway Company
- Line: San'in Main Line
- Distance: 655.4 km (407.2 miles) from Kyoto
- Platforms: 1 island platforms
- Tracks: 2
- Connections: Bus stop

Other information
- Status: Unstaffed
- Website: Official website

History
- Opened: 22 April 1914; 112 years ago

Passengers
- FY2020: 192

Services
Preceding station	JR West	Following station
Umegatō towards Shimonoseki	San'in Main Line E Local Rapid	Kawatana-Onsen towards Masuda
Location
- Location within Yamaguchi Prefecture Location within Japan

Kuroimura Station (黒井村駅, Kuroimura eki) is a passenger railway station located in the city of Shimonoseki, Yamaguchi Prefecture, Japan. It is operated by the West Japan Railway Company (JR West).

== Lines ==
Kuroimura Station is served by the JR West San'in Main Line, and is located 655.4 kilometers from the terminus of the line at Kyoto.

== Station layout ==
The station consists of one ground-level unnumbered island platform connected to the station building by a footbridge. The station is unattended.

== Platforms ==
station side	■ San'in Main Line	for Shimonoseki
opposite site	■ San'in Main Line	for Kogushi and Nagatoshi

== History ==
Kuroimura Station was opened on 22 April 1914 on the Chōshū Railway, which was railway nationalized in 1925. The line was renamed the San'in Main Line in 1933. With the privatization of the Japan National Railway (JNR) on 1 April 1987, the station came under the aegis of the West Japan railway Company (JR West).

== Passenger statistics ==
In fiscal 2020, the station was used by an average of 192 passengers daily.

== Surrounding area ==
- Shimonoseki City Toyoura General Branch/Kuroi Branch
- Shimonoseki Municipal Sincerity Elementary School
- Shimonoseki Municipal Hoyo Junior High School

== See also ==
- List of railway stations in Japan
