= Ayaragi Station =

Railway station in Shimonoseki, Yamaguchi Prefecture, Japan

Ayaragi Station 綾羅木駅
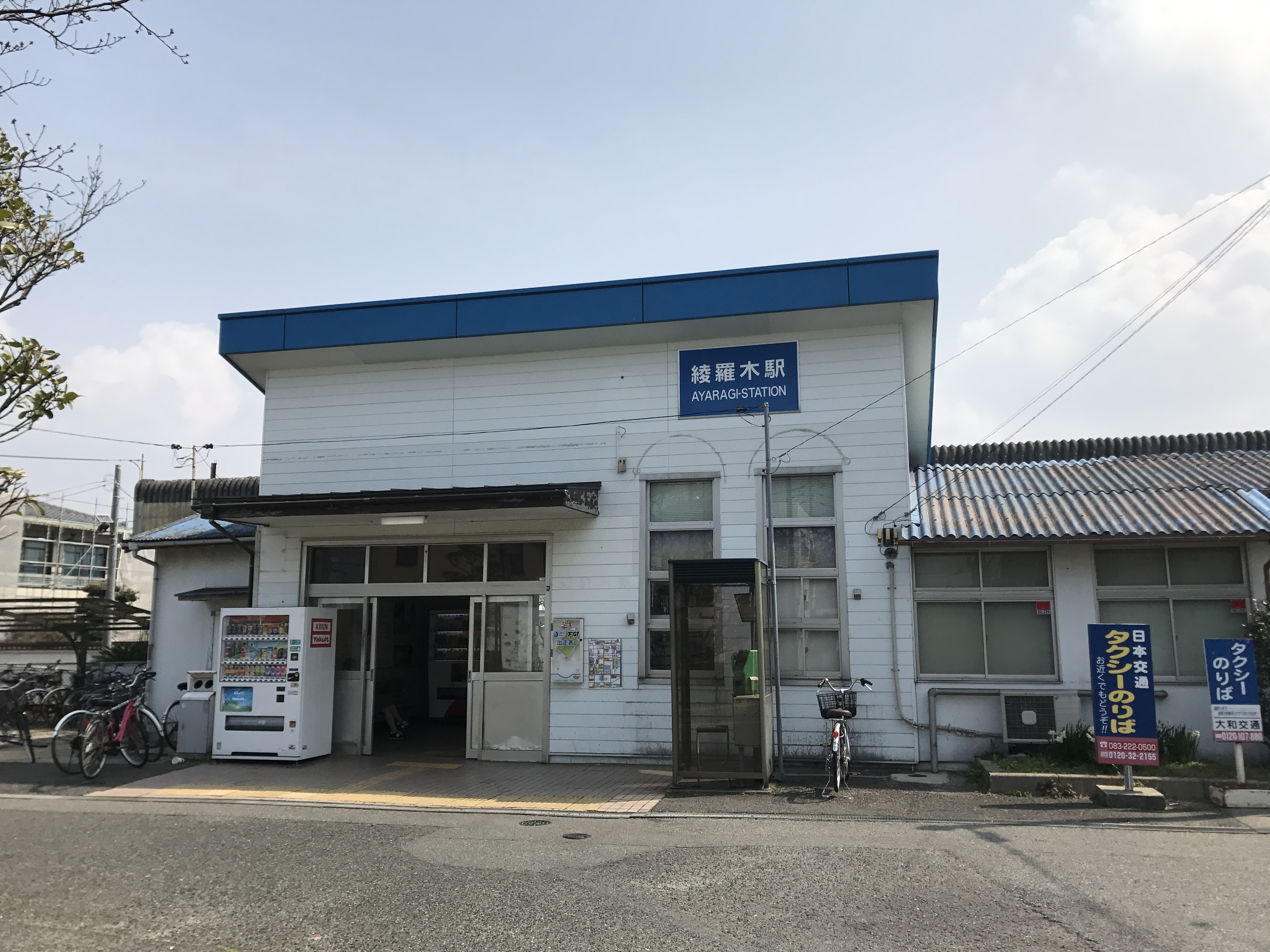
- Ayaragi Station in March 2017

General information
- Location: 1-13, Ayaragihommachi 2-chome, Shimonoseki-shi, Yamaguchi-ken 751-0849; Japan
- Coordinates: 34°0′13.85″N 130°55′35.88″E
- Owner: West Japan Railway Company
- Operator: West Japan Railway Company
- Line: San'in Main Line
- Distance: 670.7 km (416.8 miles) from Kyoto
- Platforms: 1 side platform
- Tracks: 1
- Connections: Bus stop

Other information
- Status: Unstaffed
- Website: Official website

History
- Opened: 22 April 1924; 102 years ago

Passengers
- FY2020: 613

Services
Preceding station	JR West	Following station
Kajikuri-Gōdaichi towards Shimonoseki	San'in Main Line E Local Rapid	Hatabu towards Masuda
Location
- Location within Yamaguchi Prefecture Location within Japan

Ayaragi Station (綾羅木駅, Ayaragieki) is a passenger railway station located in the city of Shimonoseki, Yamaguchi Prefecture, Japan. It is operated by the West Japan Railway Company (JR West).

== Lines ==
Ayaragi Station is served by the JR West San'in Main Line, and is located 670.7 kilometers from the terminus of the line at Kyoto.

== Station layout ==
The station consists of one ground-level side platform serving a single bi-directional track. The statin building is located on the right side of the track when facing in the direction of Shimonoseki. the station is unattended.

== History ==
Ayaragi Station was opened on 22 April 1914 on the Chōshū Railway, which was railway nationalized in 1925. The line was renamed the San'in Main Line in 1933. With the privatization of the Japan National Railway (JNR) on 1 April 1987, the station came under the aegis of the West Japan railway Company (JR West).

== Passenger statistics ==
In fiscal 2020, the station was used by an average of 613 passengers daily.

== Surrounding area ==
- Japan National Route 191
- Shimonoseki City Hall Kawanaka Branch/Kawanaka Public Hall
- Shimonoseki Municipal Kawa Junior High School
- Shimonoseki Municipal Okuda Junior High School
- Shimonoseki Municipal Kawanaka Elementary School

== See also ==
- List of railway stations in Japan
