= Umegatō Station =

Railway station in Shimonoseki, Yamaguchi Prefecture, Japan

Umegatō Station 梅ヶ峠駅
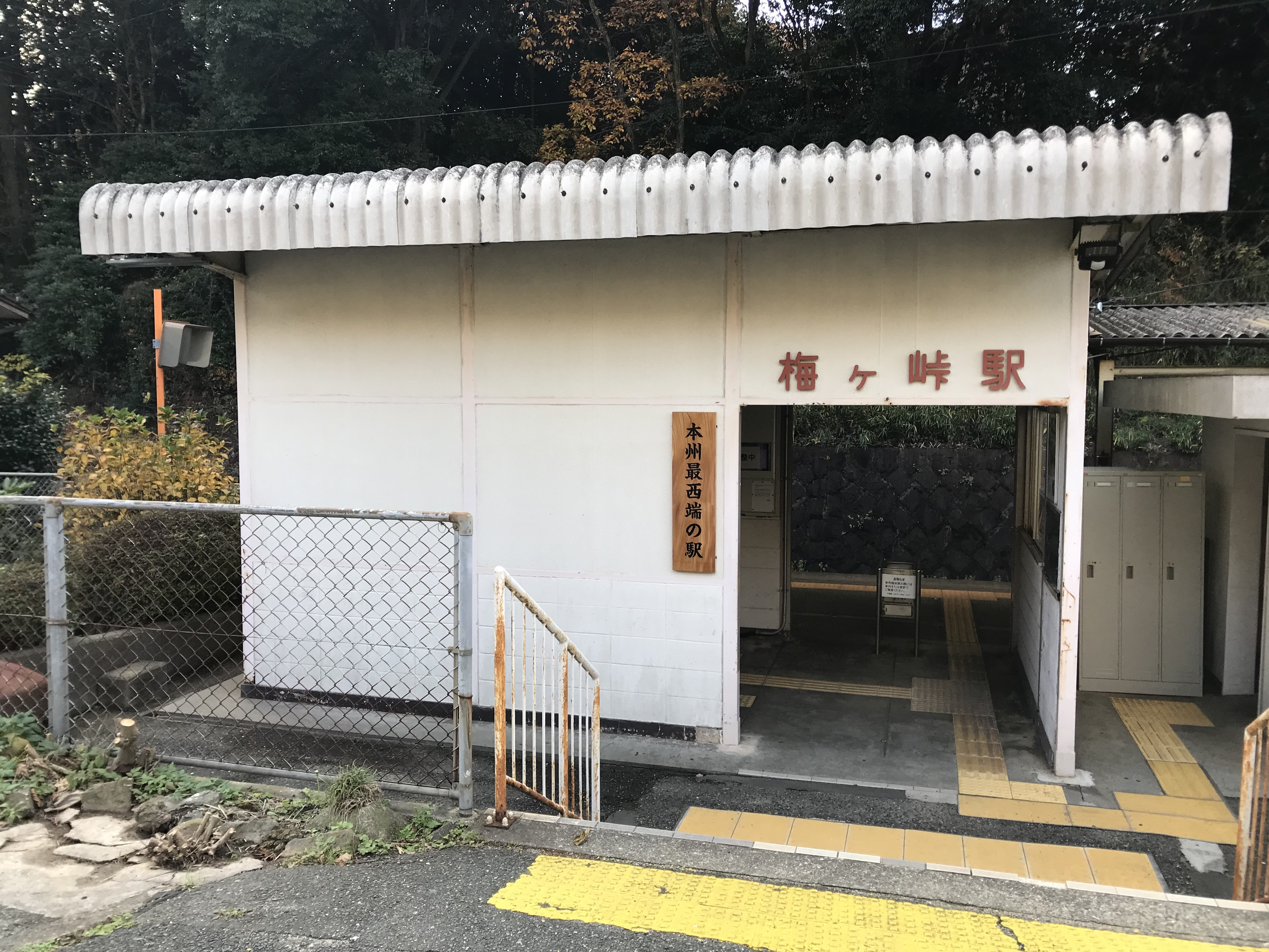
- Umegatō Station in December 2018

General information
- Location: 2, Toyoura-cho Atsumogō Umegatō, Shimonoseki-shi, Yamaguchi-ken 759-6314; Japan
- Coordinates: 34°6′6.08″N 130°54′0.98″E
- Owner: West Japan Railway Company
- Operator: West Japan Railway Company
- Line: San'in Main Line
- Distance: 658.8 km (409.4 miles) from Kyoto
- Platforms: 1 side platform
- Tracks: 1
- Connections: Bus stop

Other information
- Status: Unstaffed
- Website: Official website

History
- Opened: 22 April 1914; 112 years ago

Passengers
- FY2020: 71

Services
Preceding station	JR West	Following station
Yoshimi towards Shimonoseki	San'in Main Line E Local	Kuroimura towards Masuda
Location
- Location within Yamaguchi Prefecture Location within Japan

Umegatō Station (梅ヶ峠駅, Umegatō eki) is a passenger railway station located in the city of Shimonoseki, Yamaguchi Prefecture, Japan. It is operated by the West Japan Railway Company (JR West).

== Lines ==
Umegatō Station is served by the JR West San'in Main Line, and is located 658.8 kilometers from the terminus of the line at Kyoto.

== Station layout ==
The station consists of one ground-level side platform serving a single bi-directional track. The station building is also used as a waiting room, and an automatic ticket vending machine is installed inside. In addition, there are signs and information on the station building and platform indicating that it is the westernmost station in Honshu. The station is unattended.

== History ==
Umegatō Station was opened on 22 April 1914 on the Chōshū Railway, which was railway nationalized in 1925. The line was renamed the San'in Main Line in 1933. With the privatization of the Japan National Railway (JNR) on 1 April 1987, the station came under the aegis of the West Japan railway Company (JR West).

== Passenger statistics ==
In fiscal 2020, the station was used by an average of 71 passengers daily.

== Surrounding area ==
The station is located right next to Umegatoge, a pass between Yoshimi, Shimonoseki City and Atsumogo, former Toyoura Town. Japan National Route 191 runs through the pass.

== See also ==
- List of railway stations in Japan
