= Kanmon Kaikyo Fireworks Festival =

Fireworks display in Japan

Kanmon Kaikyo Fireworks Festival Kanmon Kaikyō Hanabi Taikai (関門海峡花火大会)
- Finale of the fireworks display in 2018
- Status: Active
- Genre: Fireworks display
- Date: August 13
- Frequency: Annually
- Location: Kanmon Straits
- Coordinates: 33.9523°N 130.9517°E
- Country: Japan
- Years active: 41
- Inaugurated: August 13, 1985
- Attendance: 800,000 (2025)
- Area: Fukuoka Prefecture and Yamaguchi Prefecture
- Organiser: Shimonoseki 21st Century Association; Moji 21st Century Town Development Association

Kanmon Kaikyo Fireworks Festival (Japanese: 関門海峡花火大会, Hepburn: Kanmon Kaikyō Hanabi Taikai), also known as the Asiaport Festival in KANMON, (Note: アジアポートフェスティバル in KANMON, Ajiapōto Fesutibaru in KANMON) is the annual fireworks display held at the Kanmon Strait every August 13.

== Overview ==
The festival is held every August 13 in Kanmon Strait between Moji-ku, Kitakyushu in Fukuoka Prefecture and Shimonoseki, in Yamaguchi Prefecture. It is one of the largest fireworks display in western Japan, with approximately 18,000 fireworks—10,500 and 7,500 on the Shimonoseki side and Moji-ku side, respectively—were launched in 2025. It is also the only fireworks festival in Japan held at a strait and a prefectural border. By 2025, the event attracted approximately 800,000 visitors from both sides of the strait. The designated viewing area in Shimonoseki are Arukaport Amusement Park in Karato and the Misaki-cho Pier, while in Moji-ku the viewing area is in Mojiko Station.

The festival was first held in 1985 in Shimonoseki, when the Shimonoseki 21st Century Association held a fireworks display to welcome visitors returning home for the Obon Festival. Since 1988, fireworks have also been launched from the Moji-ku, Kitakyushu side by the Moji 21st Century Town Development Association, and have become a joint event between the two cities. Other than welcoming Obon Festival visitors, it is also held to mourn deceased family members and to also express hope for disaster recovery.

During the COVID-19 pandemic in Japan, the event for 2020 and 2021 was cancelled. Although an unannounced surprise fireworks display was launched for both years. The event returned in 2022.
