= Yasuoka Station =

Railway station in Shimonoseki, Yamaguchi Prefecture, Japan

Yasuoka Station 安岡駅
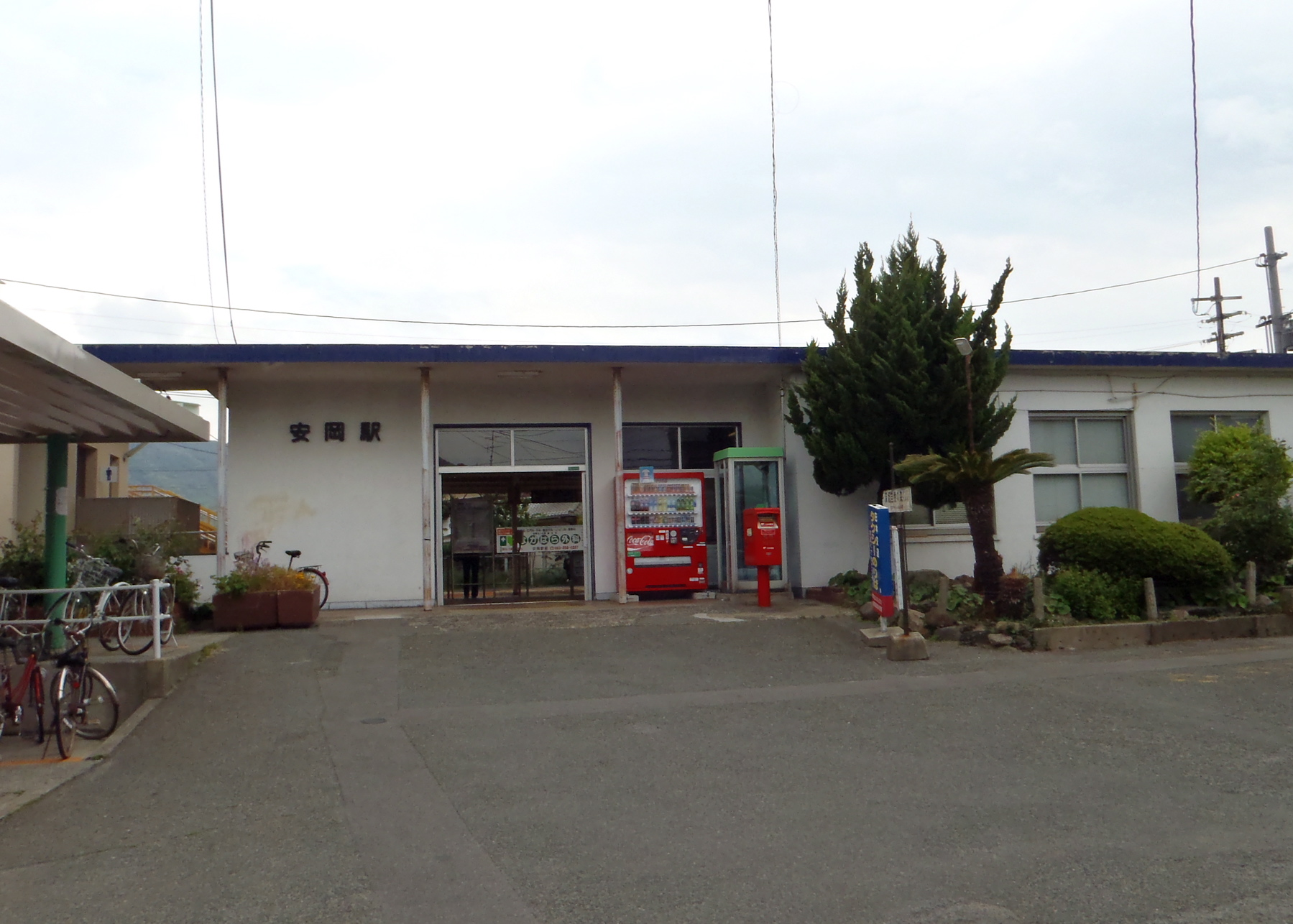
- Yasuoka Station in March 2011

General information
- Location: 1-22, Yasuokaekimae 1-chome, Shimonoseki-shi, Yamaguchi-ken 759-6612; Japan
- Coordinates: 34°1′29.44″N 130°54′59.74″E
- Owner: West Japan Railway Company
- Operator: West Japan Railway Company
- Line: San'in Main Line
- Distance: 668.2 km (415.2 miles) from Kyoto
- Platforms: 2 side platforms
- Tracks: 2
- Connections: Bus stop

Other information
- Status: Unstaffed
- Website: Official website

History
- Opened: 22 April 1914; 112 years ago

Passengers
- FY2020: 622

Services
Preceding station	JR West	Following station
Kajikuri-Gōdaichi towards Shimonoseki	San'in Main Line E Local Rapid	Fukue towards Masuda
Location
- Location within Yamaguchi Prefecture Location within Japan

Yasuoka Station (安岡駅, Yasuoka eki) is a passenger railway station located in the city of Shimonoseki, Yamaguchi Prefecture, Japan. It is operated by the West Japan Railway Company (JR West).

== Lines ==
Yasuoka Station is served by the JR West San'in Main Line, and is located 668.2 kilometers from the terminus of the line at Kyoto.

== Station layout ==
The station consists of two ground-level opposed side platforms connected to the station building by a footbridge. The station is unattended.

== Platforms ==
1	■ San'in Main Line	for Kogushi and Nagatoshi
2	■ San'in Main Line	for Shimonoseki

== History ==
Yasuoka Station was opened on 22 April 1914 on the Chōshū Railway, which was railway nationalized in 1925. The line was renamed the San'in Main Line in 1933. With the privatization of the Japan National Railway (JNR) on 1 April 1987, the station came under the aegis of the West Japan railway Company (JR West).

== Passenger statistics ==
In fiscal 2020, the station was used by an average of 622 passengers daily.

== Surrounding area ==
- Shimonoseki City Hall Yasuoka Branch
- Yamaguchi Prefectural Shimonoseki Technical High School
- Shimonoseki Municipal Yasuoka Junior High School
- Shimonoseki Municipal Yasuoka Elementary School

== See also ==
- List of railway stations in Japan
