= Yasuoka (surname) =

Yasuoka (written: 安岡 or 保岡) is a Japanese surname. Notable people with the surname include:

- Choke Yasuoka (安岡 チョーク, born 1973), Japanese wheelchair racer
- Masahiro Yasuoka (安岡 正篤, 1898–1983), Japanese scholar
- Masaomi Yasuoka (安岡 正臣, 1886–1948), Japanese general
- Okiharu Yasuoka (保岡 興治, born 1939), Japanese politician
- Rikiya Yasuoka (安岡 力也, 1947–2012), Japanese actor and singer
- Ryuto Yasuoka (保岡 龍斗, born 1995), Japanese basketball player
- Shōtarō Yasuoka (安岡 章太郎, 1920–2013), Japanese writer

== Fictional characters ==
- Shion Yasuoka (安岡 紫音), protagonist of the manga series Shion no Ō
