= Shimonoseki =

City in Yamaguchi Prefecture, Japan

Shimonoseki 下関市
- Core city
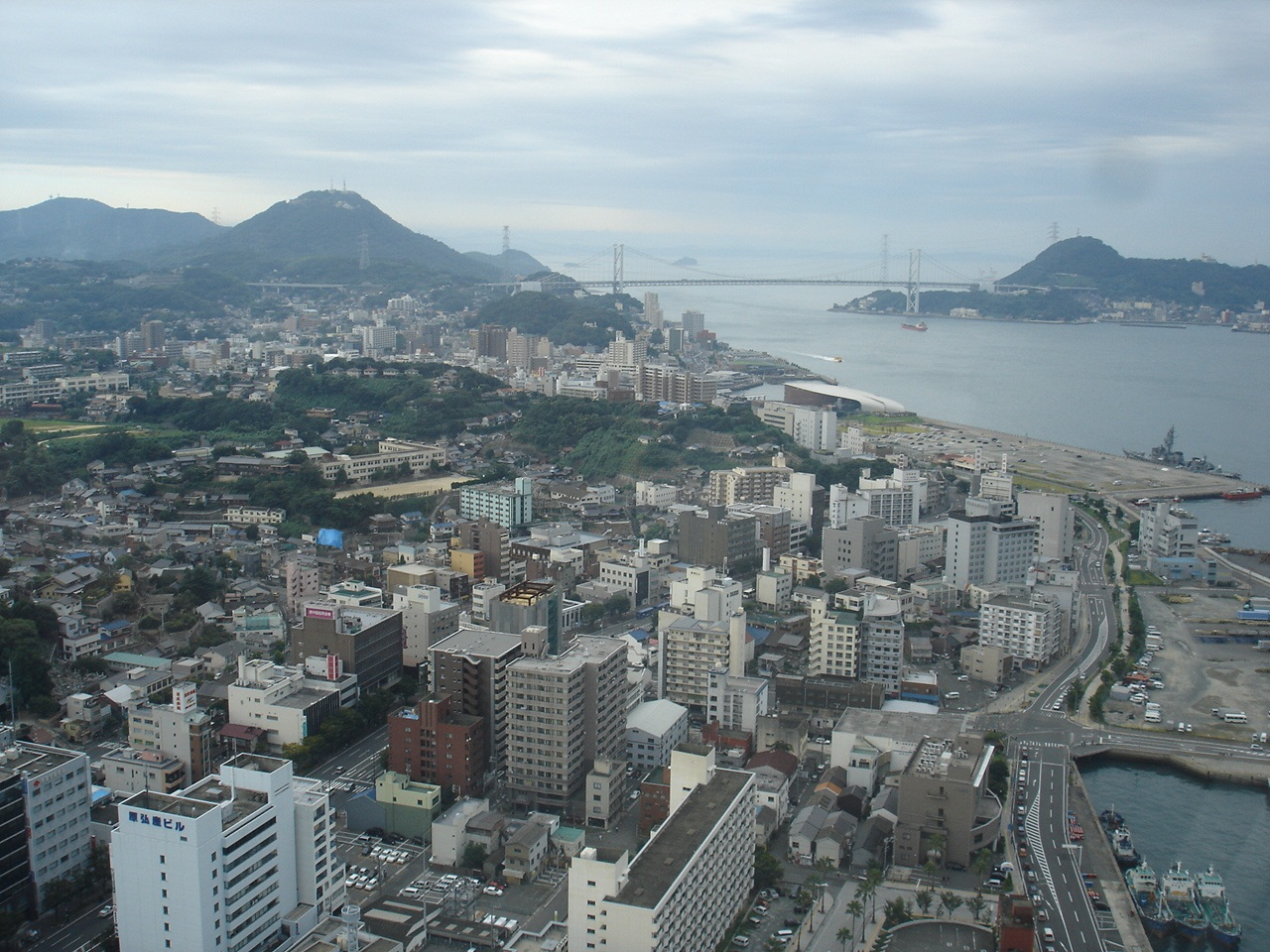
- Central Shimonoseki and Kanmon Strait

- Flag Emblem
- Location of Shimonoseki in Yamaguchi Prefecture

- Location in Japan Shimonoseki (Japan)
- Coordinates: 33°57′28″N 130°56′29″E
- Country: Japan
- Region: Chūgoku (San'yō)
- Prefecture: Yamaguchi
- As Akamagaseki: April 1, 1889
- As Shimonoseki: June 1, 1902

Government
  - Mayor: Shintaro Maeda (since 2017)

Area
  - Total: 716.18 km^{2} (276.52 sq mi)

Population (June 30, 2023)
  - Total: 248,193
  - Density: 346.55/km^{2} (897.56/sq mi)
- Time zone: UTC+09:00 (JST)
- City hall address: 1-1 Nanbu, Shimonoseki-shi, Yamaguchi-ken; 750-8521
- Climate: Cfa
- Website: Official website
- Symbols
- Bird: Penguin
- Fish: Fugu
- Flower: Rhododendron
- Insect: Firefly
- Tree: Sakura

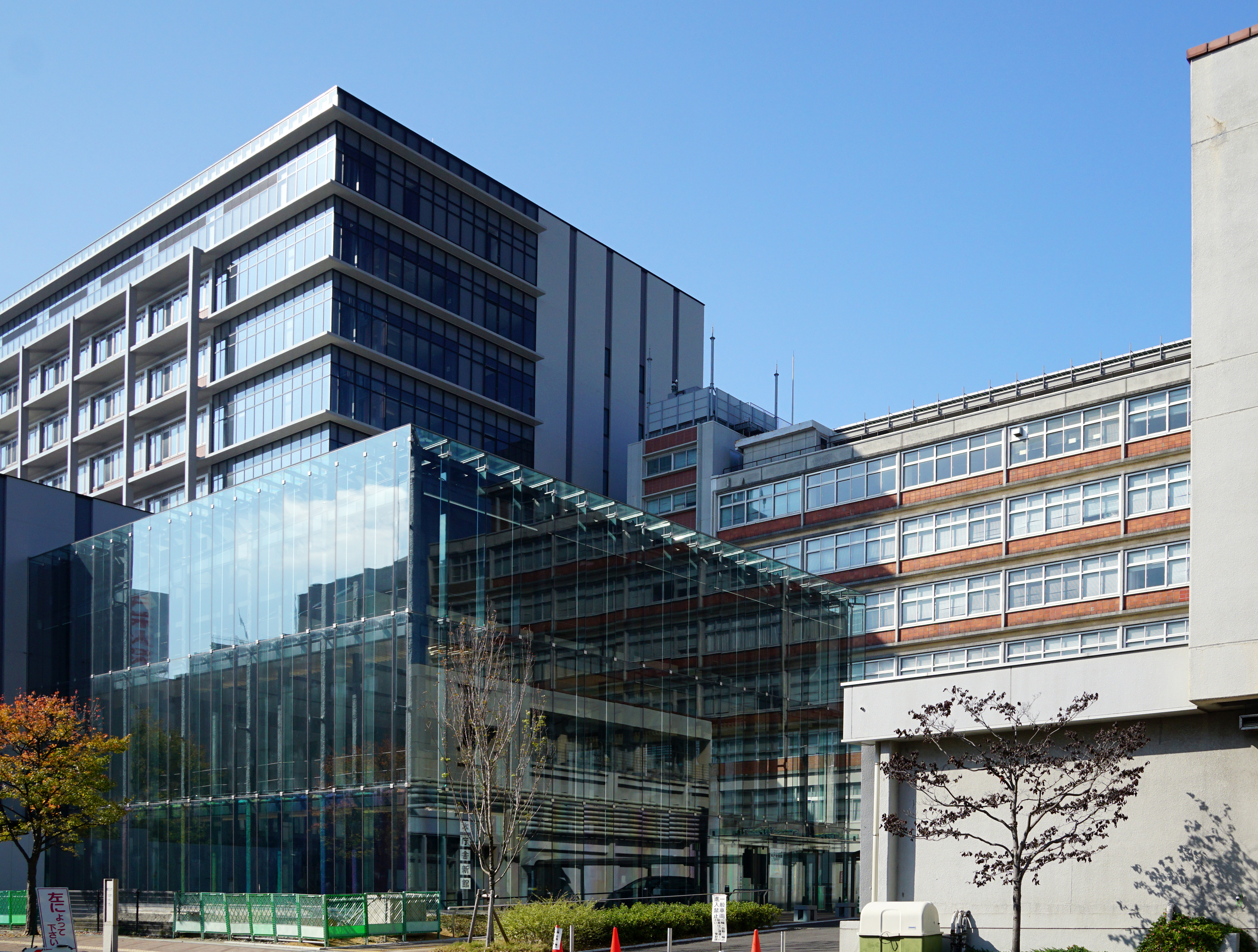
Shimonoseki city hall

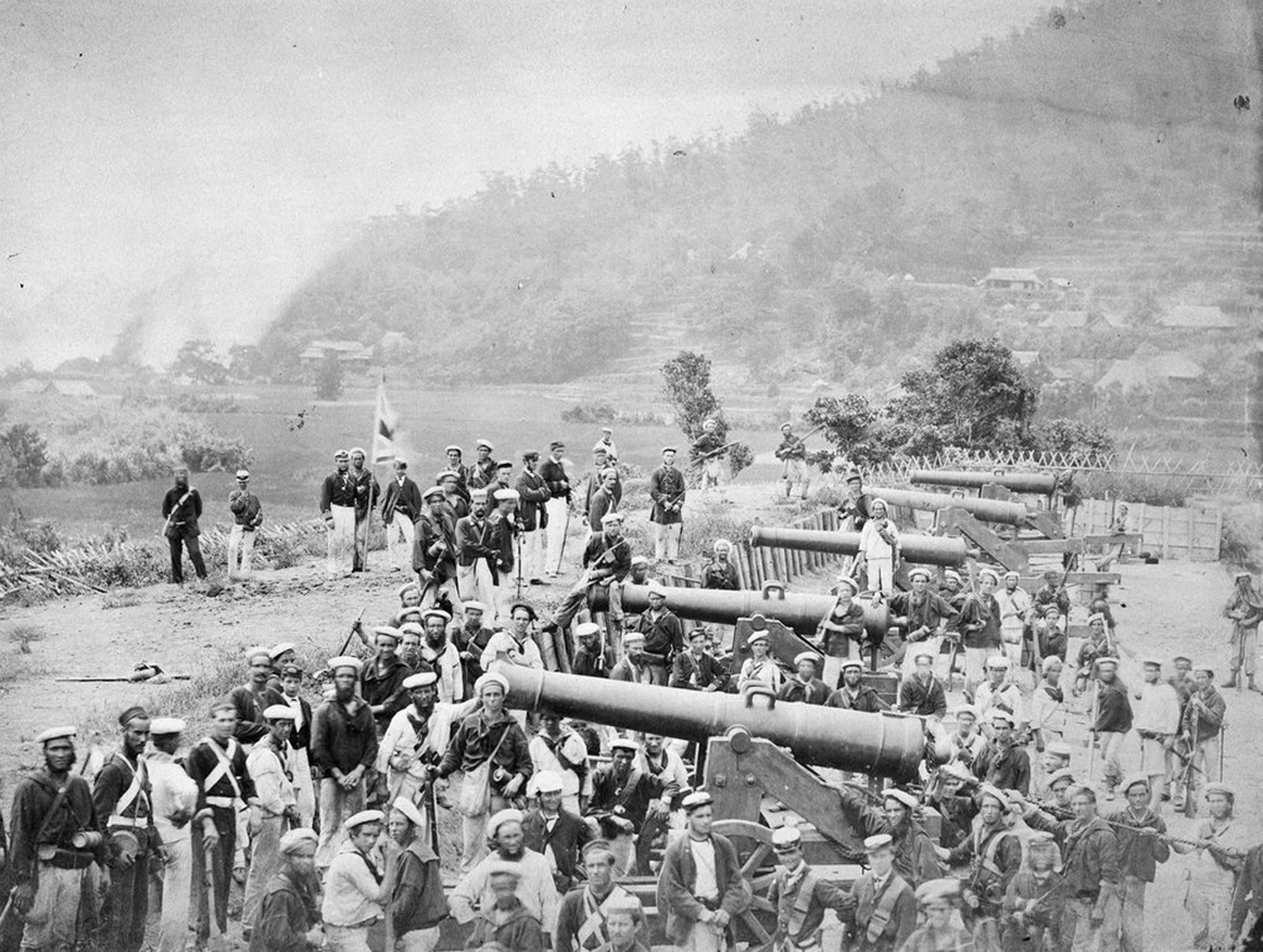
Captured battery at Shimonoseki, 1864

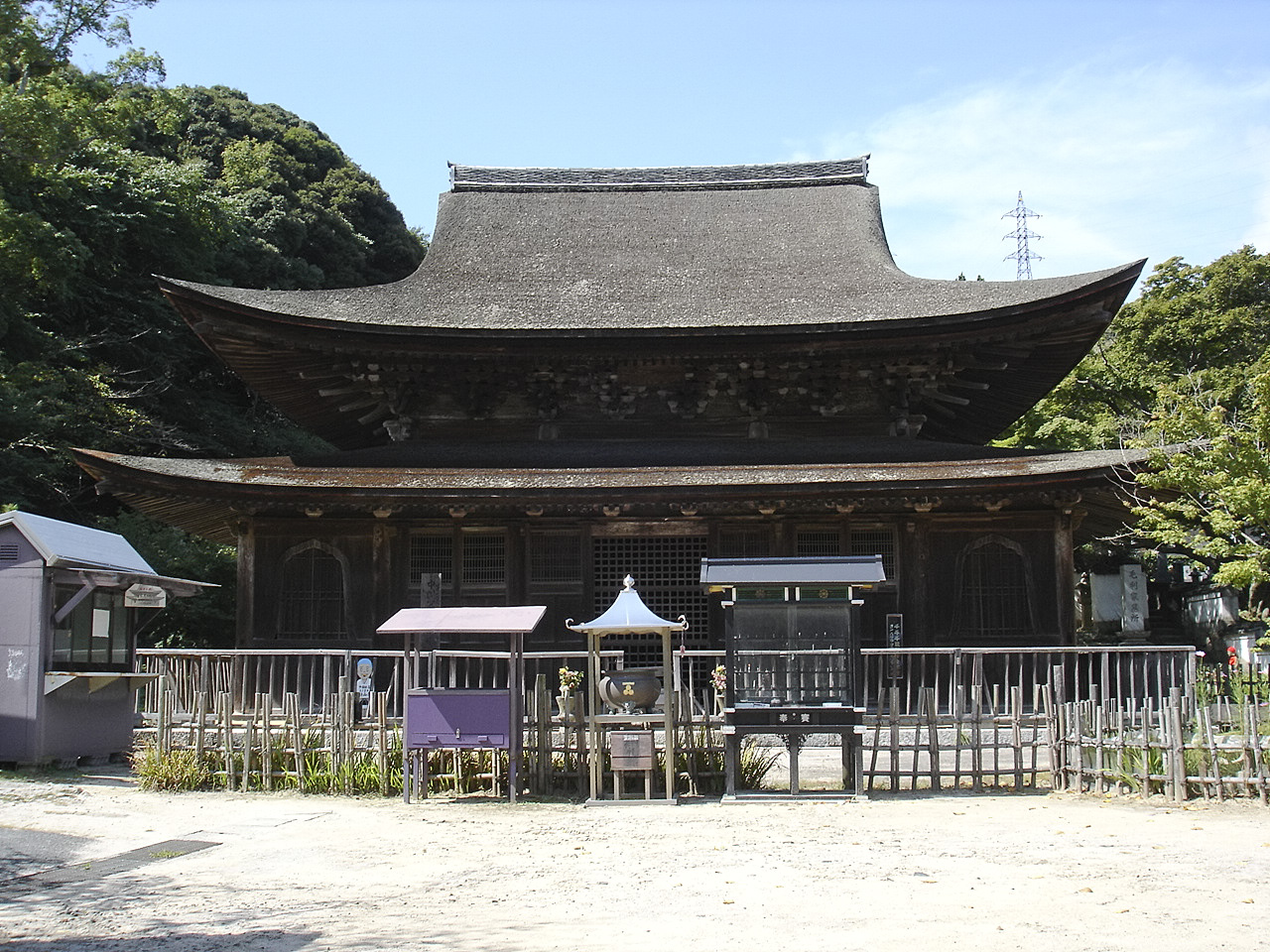
Kōzan-ji Temple

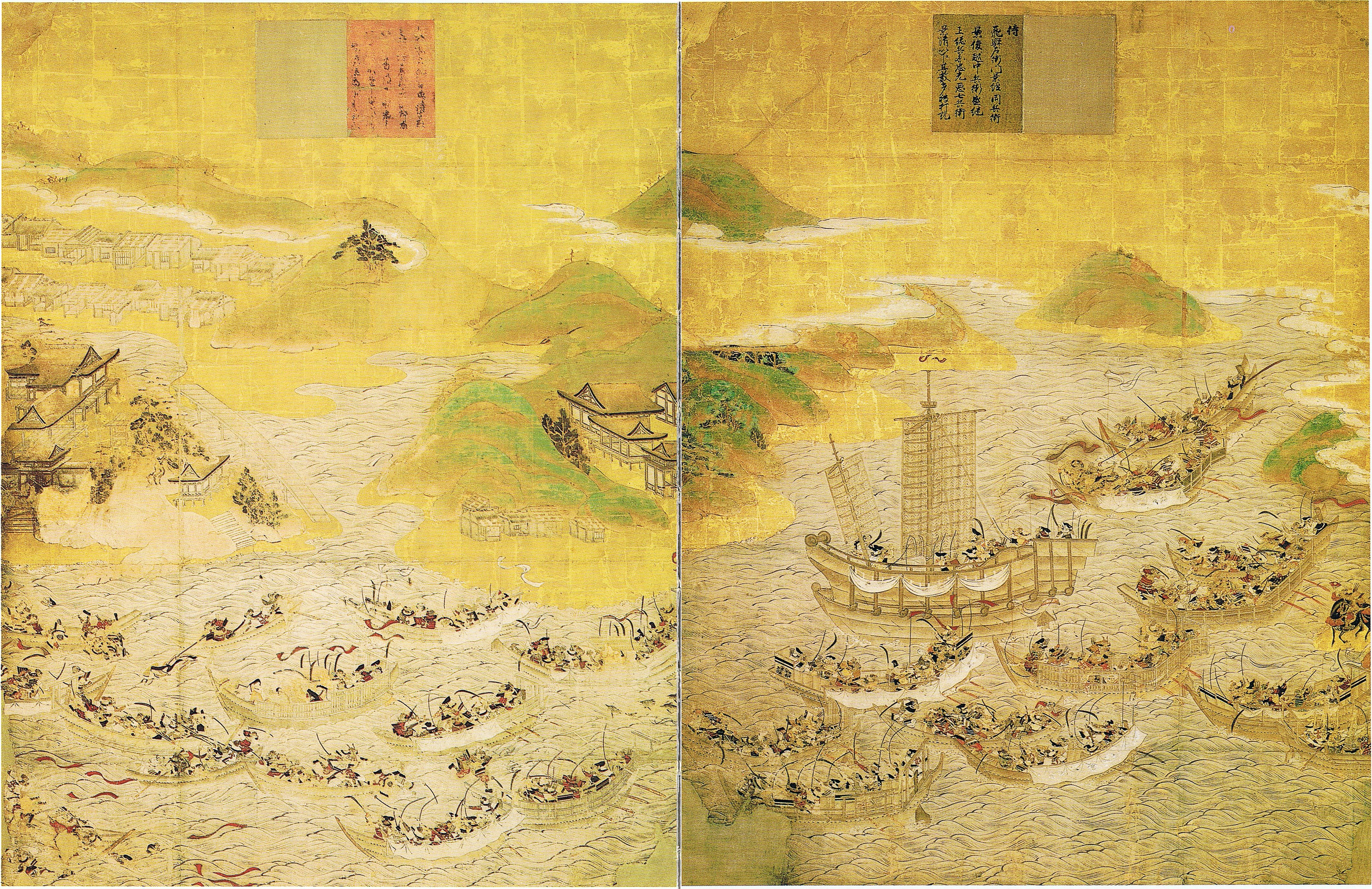
Battle of Dan-no-Ura in 1185

Shimonoseki (Japanese: 下関市, Hepburn: Shimonoseki-shi) is a city located in Yamaguchi Prefecture, Japan. The city used to be referred to as Bakan (馬関). As of 30 June 2023, the city had an estimated population of 248,193 in 128,762 households and a population density of 350 persons per km^{2}. The total area of the city is 716.18 square kilometres (276.52 sq mi). It is the largest city in Yamaguchi Prefecture and the fifth-largest city in the Chūgoku region in terms of population. It is nicknamed the 'home of Fugu' for the locally caught and cooked pufferfish, and is the largest harvester of the pufferfish in Japan.

== History ==
Shimonoseki is part of ancient Nagato Province. It has prospered since ancient times as the gateway to Honshu island from the Asian continent, including Kyushu, China, and the Korean Peninsula. According to the Nihon Shoki, the semi-legendary Emperor Chuai constructed a palace at the location of what is now the Shimonoseki city hall during the Kofun period. The name of "Shimonoseki" appears in Heian period documents from 869 AD as the location of a checkpoint controlling maritime access to the Seto Inland Sea; however, by the Kamakura period, the name of "Akamanoseki" was in more common use. During the Genpei War, the Heike and Genji fought at the Battle of Dan-no-ura near the present Kanmon Bridge. During the Muromachi period, the powerful Ōuchi clan was shugo of both Nagato and Buzen Province in Kyushu and thus controlled trade and diplomatic missions from Ming China and Joseon Korea. In the Edo period, the area was part of Chōfu Domain controlled by the Mōri clan. In February 1691, German explorer Engelbert Kaempfer visited the town as part of his two-year stay in Japan, and described it as having around 400 to 500 houses, and as a major port in the region for supplying ship provisions. During the Bakumatsu period, the Bombardment of Shimonoseki occurred in 1864, and in the early Meiji period, the Treaty of Shimonoseki was signed in 1895, seeing a defeated China hand over Taiwan, Penghu, and Port Arthur to the victorious Japanese at the end of the First Sino-Japanese War. An Imperial decree in July 1899 established Shimonoseki as an open port for trading with the United States and the United Kingdom.

Akamagaseki city was established on April 1, 1889 with the creation of the modern municipalities system. The city was renamed Shimonoseki on June 1, 1902.

On February 13, 2005, Shimonoseki absorbed the towns of Hōhoku, Kikugawa, Toyota and Toyoura (all from Toyoura District) to create the new and expanded city of Shimonseki. Since October 1, 2005, the city has been designated as a core city by the Japanese government with increased local autonomy.

== Geography ==
Shimonoseki is located at the westernmost point of Yamaguchi Prefecture and the westernmost point of Honshu. It borders the Sea of Japan to the west and the Seto Inland Sea to the south across the Kanmon Straits. It is long in the north–south direction and has a fan shape that opens to the Seto Inland Sea. The Asa River flows from the north to the central area, and the Ariho River flows from the northeast to the east, flowing southward into the Seto Inland Sea. The city hall is located on the west bank of the Ariho River mouth.

=== Neighbouring municipalities ===
Yamaguchi Prefecture

- Mine
- Nagato
- San'yō-Onoda

== Climate ==
Shimonoseki has a humid subtropical climate (Köppen climate classification Cfa) with hot summers and cool winters. Precipitation is significant throughout the year, but is heavier in summer.

Climate data for Shimonoseki (1991−2020 normals, extremes 1883−present)
Month	Jan	Feb	Mar	Apr	May	Jun	Jul	Aug	Sep	Oct	Nov	Dec	Year
Record high °C (°F)	19.1 (66.4)	23.7 (74.7)	26.6 (79.9)	29.7 (85.5)	30.9 (87.6)	35.1 (95.2)	36.2 (97.2)	38.3 (100.9)	35.0 (95.0)	30.8 (87.4)	26.9 (80.4)	26.2 (79.2)	38.3 (100.9)
Mean maximum °C (°F)	14.8 (58.6)	16.7 (62.1)	20.3 (68.5)	25.0 (77.0)	28.1 (82.6)	30.8 (87.4)	33.6 (92.5)	34.2 (93.6)	32.0 (89.6)	27.6 (81.7)	22.5 (72.5)	17.4 (63.3)	34.5 (94.1)
Mean daily maximum °C (°F)	9.7 (49.5)	10.5 (50.9)	13.7 (56.7)	18.4 (65.1)	22.7 (72.9)	25.8 (78.4)	29.7 (85.5)	31.3 (88.3)	27.8 (82.0)	23.0 (73.4)	17.5 (63.5)	12.3 (54.1)	20.2 (68.4)
Daily mean °C (°F)	7.2 (45.0)	7.5 (45.5)	10.3 (50.5)	14.7 (58.5)	19.1 (66.4)	22.5 (72.5)	26.5 (79.7)	27.9 (82.2)	24.6 (76.3)	19.7 (67.5)	14.5 (58.1)	9.5 (49.1)	17.0 (62.6)
Mean daily minimum °C (°F)	4.8 (40.6)	4.9 (40.8)	7.4 (45.3)	11.6 (52.9)	16.2 (61.2)	20.1 (68.2)	24.2 (75.6)	25.6 (78.1)	22.2 (72.0)	16.9 (62.4)	11.8 (53.2)	7.0 (44.6)	14.4 (57.9)
Mean minimum °C (°F)	0.0 (32.0)	0.2 (32.4)	2.5 (36.5)	6.3 (43.3)	12.0 (53.6)	16.7 (62.1)	20.7 (69.3)	22.2 (72.0)	17.8 (64.0)	12.1 (53.8)	6.5 (43.7)	3.0 (37.4)	−1.2 (29.8)
Record low °C (°F)	−6.3 (20.7)	−6.5 (20.3)	−5.5 (22.1)	0.5 (32.9)	6.5 (43.7)	9.5 (49.1)	15.1 (59.2)	17.5 (63.5)	12.8 (55.0)	5.9 (42.6)	0.7 (33.3)	−4.6 (23.7)	−6.5 (20.3)
Average precipitation mm (inches)	80.0 (3.15)	75.9 (2.99)	121.2 (4.77)	130.8 (5.15)	154.2 (6.07)	253.6 (9.98)	309.4 (12.18)	190.0 (7.48)	162.6 (6.40)	83.7 (3.30)	81.9 (3.22)	69.1 (2.72)	1,712.3 (67.41)
Average snowfall cm (inches)	1 (0.4)	1 (0.4)	0 (0)	0 (0)	0 (0)	0 (0)	0 (0)	0 (0)	0 (0)	0 (0)	0 (0)	0 (0)	2 (0.8)
Average precipitation days (≥ 1.0 mm)	9.3	9.1	10.1	9.6	8.7	11.3	10.7	9.1	8.5	6.1	8.0	9.0	109.5
Average snowy days (≥ 1 cm)	0.4	0.6	0	0	0	0	0	0	0	0	0	0	1
Average relative humidity (%)	63	63	65	67	70	78	79	75	73	67	66	63	69
Mean monthly sunshine hours	95.8	116.1	162.9	187.6	207.1	146.6	172.4	207.2	161.9	176.3	134.7	102.6	1,875.9
Source: Japan Meteorological Agency

Climate data for Toyota, Shimonoseki (1991−2020 normals, extremes 1977−present)
Month	Jan	Feb	Mar	Apr	May	Jun	Jul	Aug	Sep	Oct	Nov	Dec	Year
Record high °C (°F)	17.6 (63.7)	21.8 (71.2)	25.7 (78.3)	28.4 (83.1)	31.5 (88.7)	34.1 (93.4)	37.1 (98.8)	37.0 (98.6)	35.0 (95.0)	30.7 (87.3)	26.4 (79.5)	23.2 (73.8)	37.1 (98.8)
Mean daily maximum °C (°F)	8.7 (47.7)	9.8 (49.6)	13.4 (56.1)	18.6 (65.5)	23.1 (73.6)	25.9 (78.6)	29.3 (84.7)	30.7 (87.3)	27.2 (81.0)	22.3 (72.1)	16.7 (62.1)	11.2 (52.2)	19.7 (67.5)
Daily mean °C (°F)	3.6 (38.5)	4.4 (39.9)	7.5 (45.5)	12.4 (54.3)	17.3 (63.1)	21.2 (70.2)	25.1 (77.2)	25.9 (78.6)	22.0 (71.6)	16.1 (61.0)	10.4 (50.7)	5.4 (41.7)	14.3 (57.7)
Mean daily minimum °C (°F)	−1.1 (30.0)	−0.8 (30.6)	1.7 (35.1)	6.1 (43.0)	11.4 (52.5)	17.0 (62.6)	21.6 (70.9)	22.1 (71.8)	17.8 (64.0)	10.8 (51.4)	5.0 (41.0)	0.5 (32.9)	9.3 (48.8)
Record low °C (°F)	−7.9 (17.8)	−9.1 (15.6)	−6.2 (20.8)	−4.0 (24.8)	0.0 (32.0)	5.5 (41.9)	12.0 (53.6)	14.3 (57.7)	4.6 (40.3)	−0.6 (30.9)	−3.7 (25.3)	−6.3 (20.7)	−9.1 (15.6)
Average precipitation mm (inches)	90.8 (3.57)	88.3 (3.48)	140.5 (5.53)	151.4 (5.96)	183.7 (7.23)	272.5 (10.73)	342.8 (13.50)	201.2 (7.92)	167.8 (6.61)	93.3 (3.67)	88.2 (3.47)	83.1 (3.27)	1,899.1 (74.77)
Average precipitation days (≥ 1.0 mm)	11.3	10.7	11.6	10.0	9.5	12.4	11.6	9.9	9.5	7.7	9.3	11.1	124.6
Mean monthly sunshine hours	99.8	107.6	156.1	182.9	206.1	137.0	152.6	189.8	151.6	169.5	134.5	103.9	1,791.3
Source: Japan Meteorological Agency

== Demographics ==
Per Japanese census data, the population of Shimonoseki in 2020 is 255,051 people. Shimonoseki has been conducting censuses since 1920.

Historical population
Year	Pop.	±%
1920	192,840	—
1925	213,109	+10.5%
1930	222,702	+4.5%
1935	237,248	+6.5%
1940	261,549	+10.2%
1945	261,982	+0.2%
1950	280,949	+7.2%
1955	308,799	+9.9%
1960	317,029	+2.7%
1965	317,146	+0.0%
1970	315,603	−0.5%
1975	322,300	+2.1%
1980	325,478	+1.0%
1985	324,585	−0.3%
1990	315,643	−2.8%
1995	310,717	−1.6%
2000	301,097	−3.1%
2005	290,693	−3.5%
2010	280,987	−3.3%
2015	268,517	−4.4%
2020	255,051	−5.0%
Shimonoseki population statistics

== Government ==
Shimonoseki has a mayor-council form of government with a directly elected mayor and a unicameral city council of 34 members. Shimonoseki contributes ten members to the Yamaguchi Prefectural Assembly. In terms of national politics, the city is part of the Yamaguchi 3rd district of the lower house of the Diet of Japan. Shimonoseki was represented by Shinzo Abe, former Japanese Prime Minister, in the lower house between 1993 and 2022.

== Economy ==
Having prospered as a port city, Shimonoseki has long had a thriving industry related to shipping, trade, and finance. It is still the center of the prefecture in terms of economy.

== Education ==
=== Universities and colleges ===
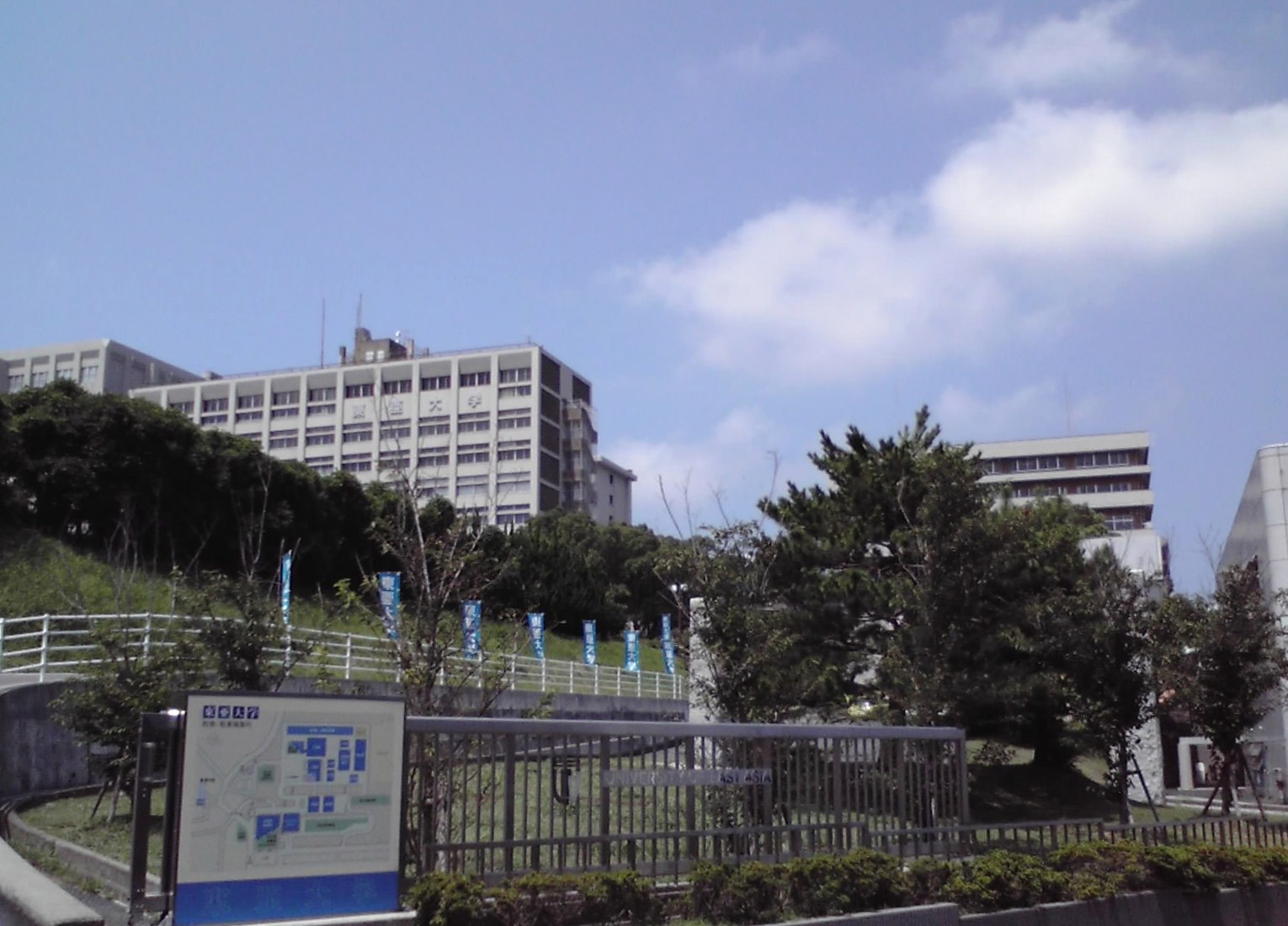
University of East Asia

- Baiko Gakuin University
- Baiko Gakuin University Women's Junior College
- National Fisheries University
- Shimonoseki City University
- Shimonoseki Junior College
- University of East Asia

=== Primary and secondary schools ===
Shimonoseki has 41 public elementary schools, 21 public junior high schools, and one public high school operated by the city government. The city has nine public high schools operated by the Yamaguchi Prefectural Board of Education. There are also one private junior high school and five private high schools. The prefecture also operates four special education schools for the handicapped.

The city has a Chōsen gakkō (school allied with North Korea), Yamaguchi Korean Elementary and Junior High School (山口朝鮮初中級学校). It formerly housed two other North Korean schools, Yamaguchi Korean High School and Shimonoseki Korean Elementary and Junior High School (下関朝鮮初中級学校).

== Transportation ==
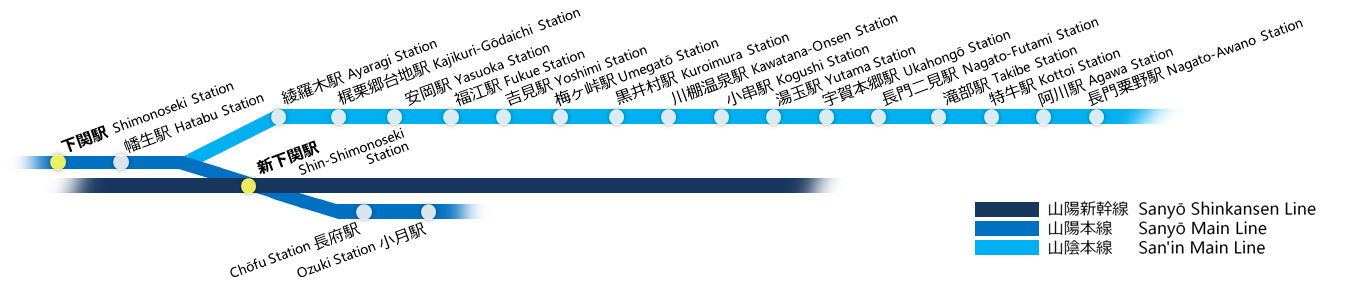
JR network map

=== Railway ===
JR West – San'yō Shinkansen

- Shin-Shimonoseki

JR West (JR West) - San'yō Main Line

- Ozuki - Chōfu - Shin-Shimonoseki - Hatabu - Shimonoseki

JR West (JR West) - San'in Main Line

- Nagato-Awano - Agawa - Kottoi - Takibe - Nagato-Futami - Ukahongō - Yutama - Kogushi - Kawatana-Onsen - Kuroimura - Umegatō - Yoshimi - Fukue - Yasuoka - Kajikuri-Gōdaichi - Ayaragi - Hatabu - Shimonoseki

=== Highways ===
- Chugoku Expressway
- National Route 2
- National Route 9
- National Route 191
- National Route 435
- National Route 491

=== Ferries from Shimonoseki Port International Terminal ===
- The Kanpu ferry to Busan, South Korea regularly.
- The Gwangyang Beech to Gwangyang, South Korea regularly.
- The Orient ferry to Shanghai, China regularly.
- The Orient ferry to Qingdao, China was suspended in November 2015.

== Sister cities ==
Shimonoseki is twinned with:

- Santos, Brazil (1971)
- Istanbul, Turkey (1972)
- Busan, South Korea (1976)
- Qingdao, China (1979)
- Pittsburg (California), United States (1998)

== Local attractions ==
=== Festivals ===
Shimonoseki is home to many festivals, held throughout the year. Of these, the most famous are the Shimonoseki Kaikyo Festival and Shimonoseki Bakan Festival.

- Shimonoseki Fugu Festival (February): Haedomari Market
- Kawatana Onsen Festival (April)
- Shimonoseki Kaikyo Festival (May): Karato, Ganryujima Island
- Suhouteisai Festival (August): Castle town Chofu
- Kanmon Kaikyo Fireworks Festival (August): Karato(Aruka Port area)
- Shimonoseki Bakan Festival (August): Along the street from Karato-cho to Shimonoseki Station
- TOUR de Shimonoseki (October/November)
- Shimonoseki Kaikyo Marathon (November)
- Shimonoseki Fish Festival (November): Shimonoseki Fishing Port
- Little Busan Fest (November): Green Mall

=== Architecture ===
- Akama Shrine
- Kaikyō Yume Tower
- Kōzan-ji - The butsuden completed in 1320 is a National Treasure of Japan.

=== Museums ===
- Doigahama Site Anthropological Museum
- The Firefly Museum of Toyota Town
- Shimonoseki City Archaeological Museum
- Shimonoseki City Art Museum
- Shimonoseki City Museum of History
- Shimonoseki Marine Science Museum (Shimonoseki City Aquarium) (Kaikyo Kan)
- The Yamagin Archive (やまぎん史料館) of the Yamaguchi Bank

=== Parks and monuments ===
- The Mimosusogawa Park (みもすそ川公園) in Shimonoseki commemorates the final stage of the Genpei war between the feudal Taira clan and Minamoto clan (1180–1185). There is a historical monument with cannons.

=== Sports ===
==== Professional teams ====
- FC Baleine Shimonoseki (Football)

==== Sporting venues ====
- Nogihama General Park (Football stadium)
- Shimonoseki Baseball Stadium
- Shimonoseki Boat Race Stadium (Shimonoseki Kyōtei)
- Shimonoseki City Gymnasium
- Shimonoseki city swimming pool
- Shimonoseki Track and field stadium

== Crime and safety ==
The Goda-ikka yakuza syndicate is headquartered in Shimonoseki. A designated yakuza group, the Goda-ikka is the largest yakuza syndicate in Yamaguchi Prefecture.

== Notable people from Shimonoseki ==
- Arata Izumi (Indian footballer)
- Hina Kawata, actress
- Yūsaku Matsuda
- Toshihiro Nagoshi (video game director, game designer and producer)
- Atsushi Tamura (Comedian, actor and singer)
- Kinuyo Tanaka, actress
- Kaoru Wada, (composer and arranger)
