= Ofuku Station =

Railway station in Mine, Yamaguchi Prefecture, Japan

Ofuku Station 於福駅
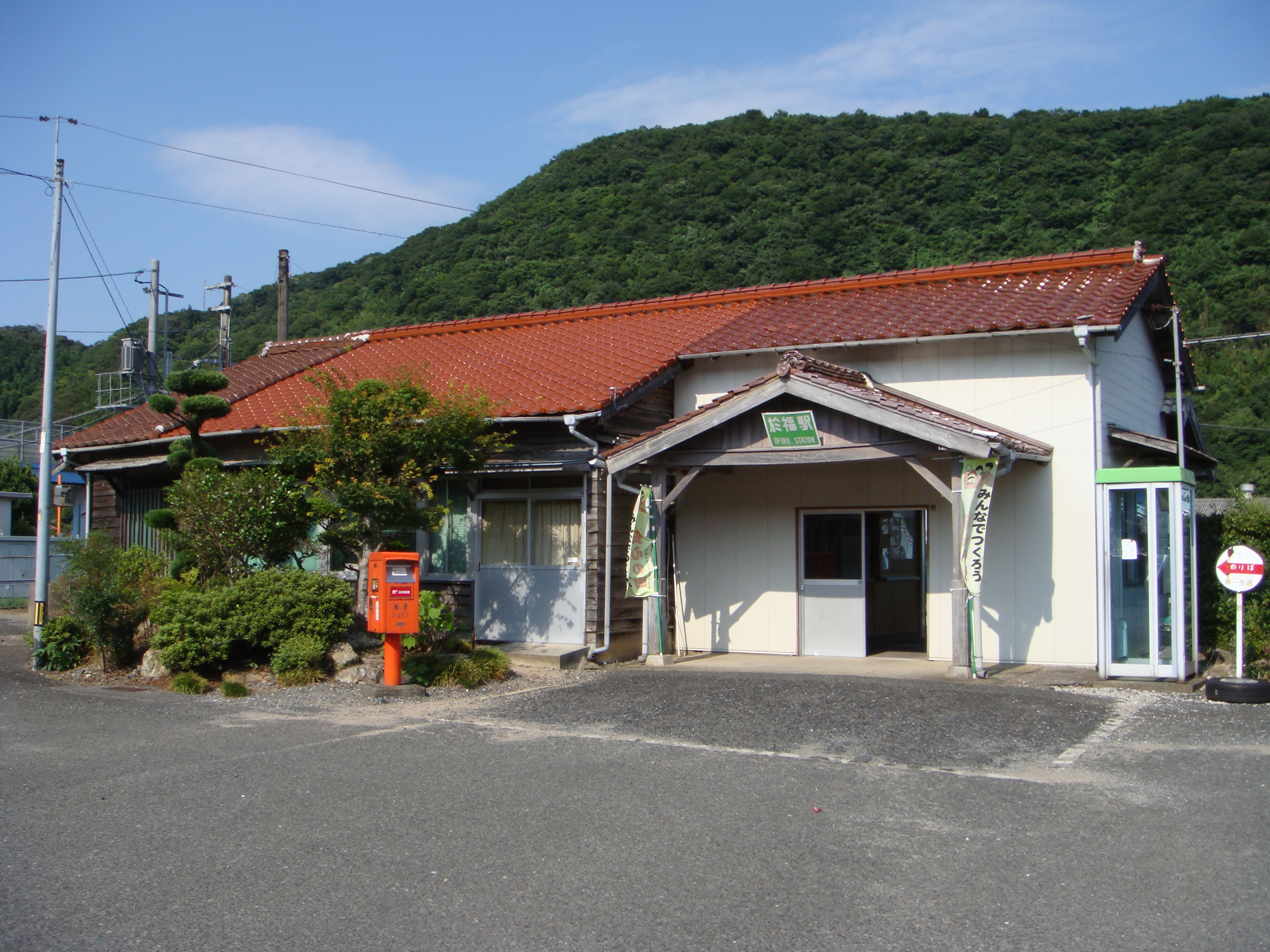
- Ofuku Station in July 2008

General information
- Location: 2863 Norita, Ofuku-cho, Mine-shi, Yamaguchi-ken 759-2301; Japan
- Coordinates: 34°14′10.9″N 131°12′28.8″E
- Owner: West Japan Railway Company
- Operator: West Japan Railway Company
- Line: Mine Line
- Distance: 27.2 km (16.9 miles) from Asa
- Platforms: 2 side platforms
- Tracks: 2
- Connections: Bus stop

Construction
- Structure type: At grade

Other information
- Status: Unstaffed
- Website: Official website

History
- Opened: 30 October 1920

Passengers
- FY2020: 30

Services
Preceding station	JR West	Following station
Shigeyasu towards Asa	Mine Line	Shibuki towards Nagatoshi
Location
- Location within Yamaguchi Prefecture Location within Japan

Ofuku Station (於福駅, Ofuku-eki) is a passenger railway station located in the city of Mine, Yamaguchi Prefecture, Japan. It is operated by the West Japan Railway Company (JR West).

== Lines ==
Ofuku Station is served by the JR West Mine Line, and is located 27.2 kilometers from the junction of the San'yō Main Line at Asa.

== Station layout ==
The station consists of two opposed ground-level unnumbered side platforms, connected by a footbridge. The station is unattended.

== Platforms ==
station side	■ Mine Line	for Nagatoshi
opposite side	■ Mine Line	for Mine and Asa

== History ==
Ofuku Station was opened on 30 October 1920. With the privatization of the Japan National Railway (JNR) on 1 April 1987, the station came under the aegis of the West Japan railway Company (JR West).

== Passenger statistics ==
In fiscal 2020, the station was used by an average of 30 passengers daily.

== Surrounding area ==
The station building is located on the west side of the original village, but because Japan National Route 316 passes through the east side of the station and a roadside station is built nearby, with an overpass that serves as a free passage.

- Ofuku Junior High School
- Mine Municipal Ofuku Elementary School
- Road Station Ofuku

== See also ==
- List of railway stations in Japan
