= Shirōgahara Station =

Railway station in Mine, Yamaguchi Prefecture, Japan

Shirōgahara Station 四郎ケ原駅
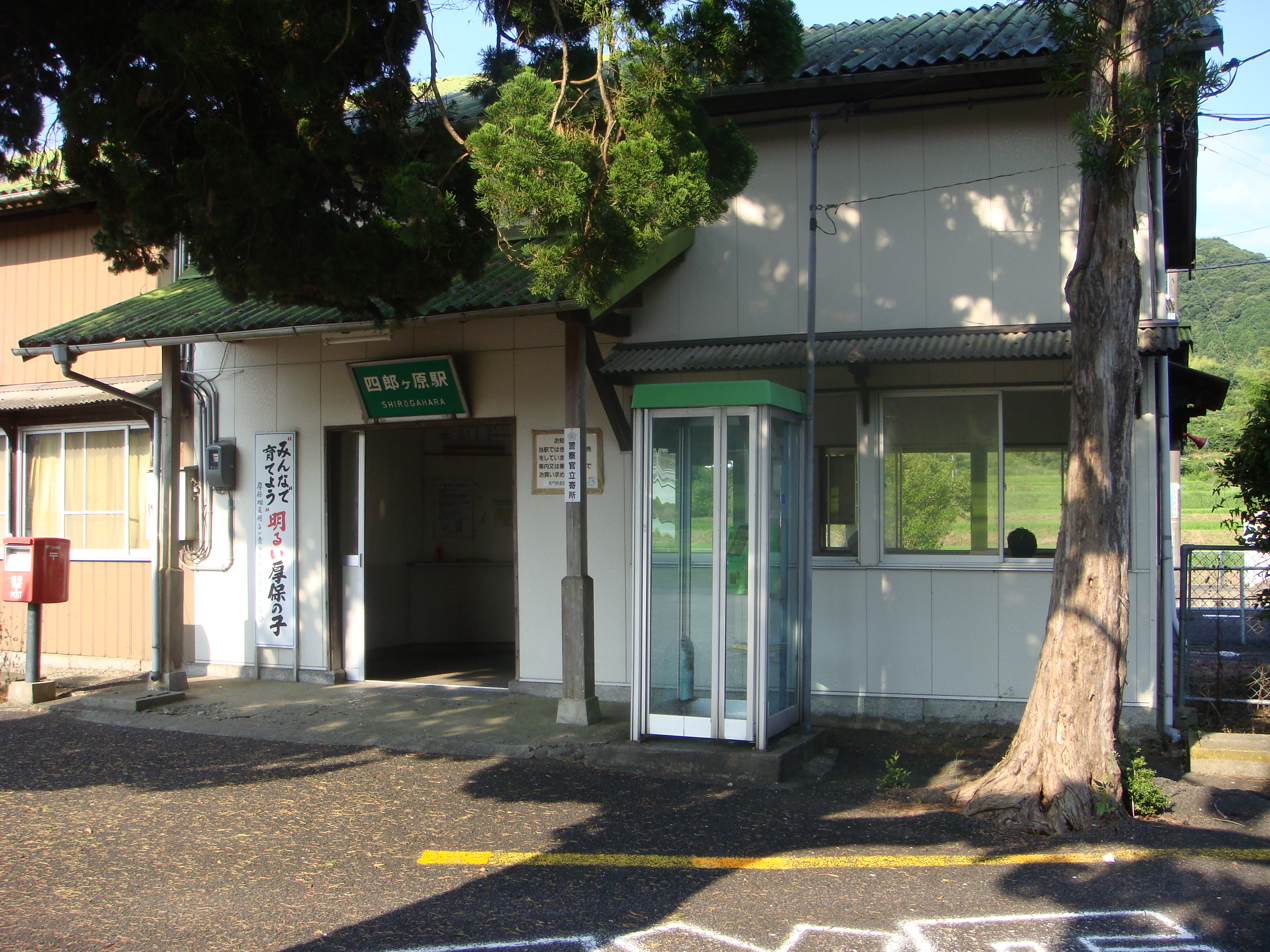
- Shirōgahara Station in July 2008

General information
- Location: 2128 Kawahigashi Omukai, Higashiatsubo-cho, Mine-shi, Yamaguchi-ken 759-2142; Japan
- Coordinates: 34°8′14.38″N 131°9′39.86″E
- Owner: West Japan Railway Company
- Operator: West Japan Railway Company
- Line: Mine Line
- Distance: 13.2 km (8.2 miles) from Asa
- Platforms: 2 side platforms
- Tracks: 2
- Connections: Bus stop

Construction
- Structure type: At grade

Other information
- Status: Unstaffed
- Website: Official website

History
- Opened: 13 September 1905

Passengers
- FY2020: 7

Services
Preceding station	JR West	Following station
Atsu towards Asa	Mine Line	Minami-Ōmine towards Nagatoshi
Location
- Location within Yamaguchi Prefecture Location within Japan

Shirōgahara Station (四郎ヶ原駅, Shirōgahara-eki) is a passenger railway station located in the city of Mine, Yamaguchi Prefecture, Japan. It is operated by the West Japan Railway Company (JR West).

== Lines ==
Shirōgahara Station is served by the JR West Mine Line, and is located 13.2 kilometers from the junction of the San'yō Main Line at Asa.

== Station layout ==
The station consists of two opposed ground-level unnumbered side platforms, connected by a footbridge. The station is unattended.

== Platforms ==
station side	■ Mine Line	for Mine and Nagatoshi
opposite side	■ Mine Line	for Asa

== History ==
Shirōgahara Station was opened on 13 September 1905 with the opening of the San'yō Railway between Asa Station and Ōmine Station. The San'yō Railway was nationalized in 1906, and the line became the Ōmine Line in 1909, and the Mine Line from 1963. With the privatization of the Japan National Railway (JNR) on 1 April 1987, the station came under the aegis of the West Japan railway Company (JR West). The statin building was renovated in 2013.

== Passenger statistics ==
In fiscal 2020, the station was used by an average of 7 passengers daily.

== Surrounding area ==
It is located in the southern part of Mine City. The surrounding area is a small village.

- Mine Municipal Kawahigashi Elementary School
- Yamaguchi Prefectural Route 33 Shimonoseki-Mine Line
- Asa River

== See also ==
- List of railway stations in Japan
