= Yunotō Station =

Railway station in San'yō-Onoda, Yamaguchi Prefecture, Japan

Yunotō Station 湯ノ峠駅
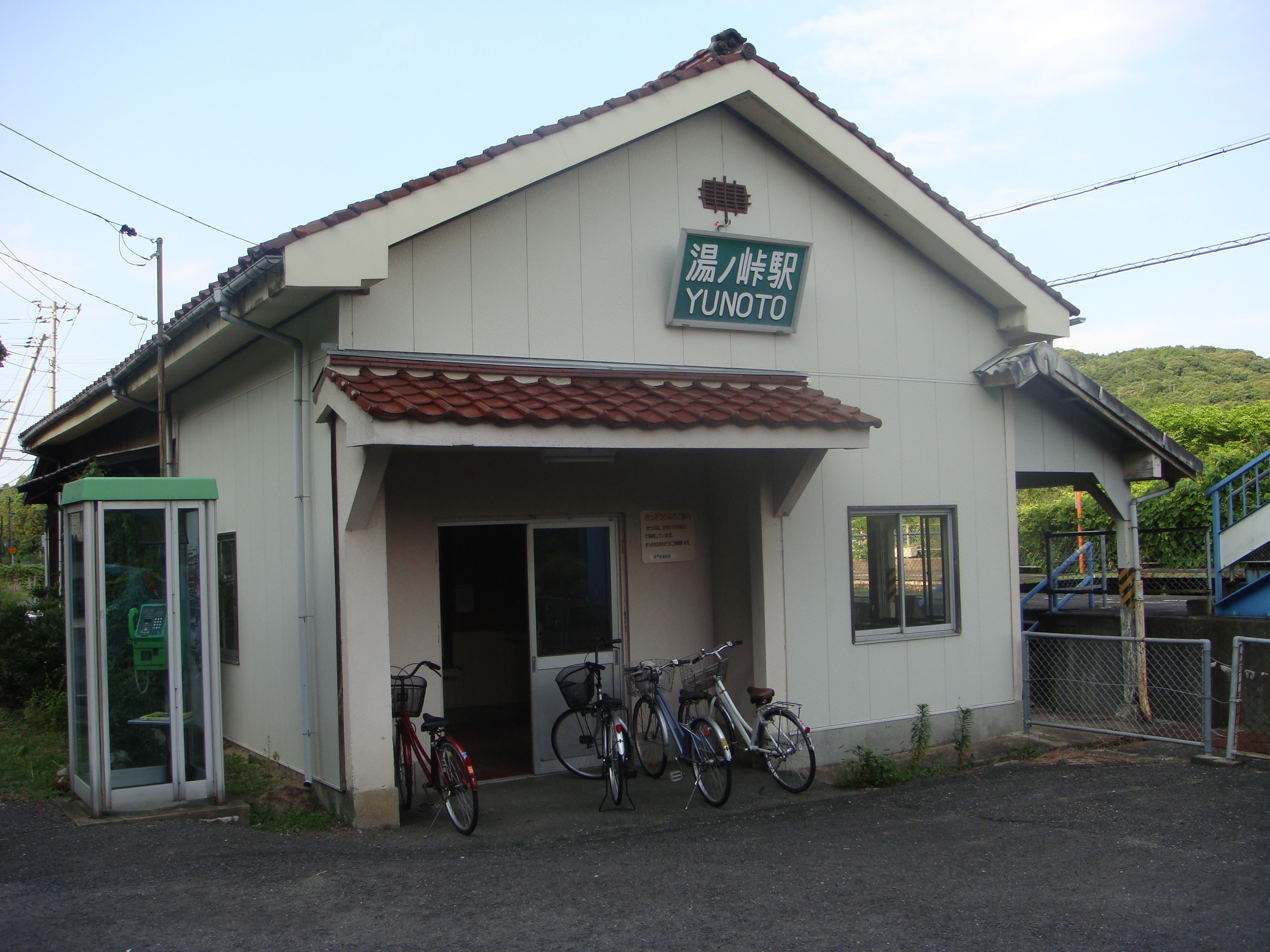
- Yunotō Station in July 2008

General information
- Location: 5691-3 Tateishi, Asa, San'yō-Onoda-shi, Yamaguchi-ken 757-0001; Japan
- Coordinates: 34°5′8.18″N 131°10′21.29″E
- Owner: West Japan Railway Company
- Operator: West Japan Railway Company
- Line: Mine Line
- Distance: 4.2 km (2.6 miles) from Asa
- Platforms: 2 side platform
- Tracks: 2
- Connections: Bus stop

Construction
- Structure type: At grade

Other information
- Status: Unstaffed
- Website: Official website

History
- Opened: 10 February 1921

Passengers
- FY2020: 4

Services
Preceding station	JR West	Following station
Asa Terminus	Mine Line	Atsu towards Nagatoshi
Location
- Location within Yamaguchi Prefecture Location within Japan

Yunotō Station (湯ノ峠駅, Yunotō-eki) is a passenger railway station located in the city of San'yō-Onoda, Yamaguchi Prefecture, Japan. It is operated by the West Japan Railway Company (JR West).

== Lines ==
Yunotō Station is served by the JR West Mine Line, and is located 4.2 kilometers from the junction of the San'yō Main Line at Asa.

== Station layout ==
The station consists of two opposed ground-level unnumbered side platforms, connected by a footbridge. The station is unattended.

== Platforms ==
station side	■ Mine Line	for Mine and Nagatoshi
opposite side	■ Mine Line	for Asa

== History ==
Yunotō Station was opened on 10 February 1921. With the privatization of the Japan National Railway (JNR) on 1 April 1987, the station came under the aegis of the West Japan railway Company (JR West).

== Passenger statistics ==
In fiscal 2020, the station was used by an average of 4 passengers daily.

== Surrounding area ==
The surrounding area is a village in the mountains. The Asa River runs parallel to the Mine Line on the opposite side of the station waiting room, and Japan National Route 316 runs parallel to the river. Yunotoge Onsen is about 250 meters to the south

== See also ==
- List of railway stations in Japan
