= Managata, Yamaguchi =

Dissolved municipality in Mine district, Yamaguchi prefecture, Japan

Managata (真長田村, Managata-mura) was a village in Mine District, Yamaguchi Prefecture.

The village merged with three towns and villages in 1954 and the village dissolved. Currently the village is part of the city of Mine.

== Geography ==
The village was a farmland.

== History ==
- April 1, 1889 - Due to the municipal status enforcement, the village was founded within Mine District. At the same time, the villages of Nagata and Mana merged.
- 1918 - Parts of the village of Ono in Asa District merged into the village of Managata.
- October 1, 1954 - The village merged with the villages of Ayagi, Akagō, and Ōda merged to form the town of Mitō.
- March 21, 2008 - Due to the merger, town of Mitō becomes the city of Mine.
