= Shibuki Station =

Railway station in Mine, Yamaguchi Prefecture, Japan

Shibuki Station 渋木駅
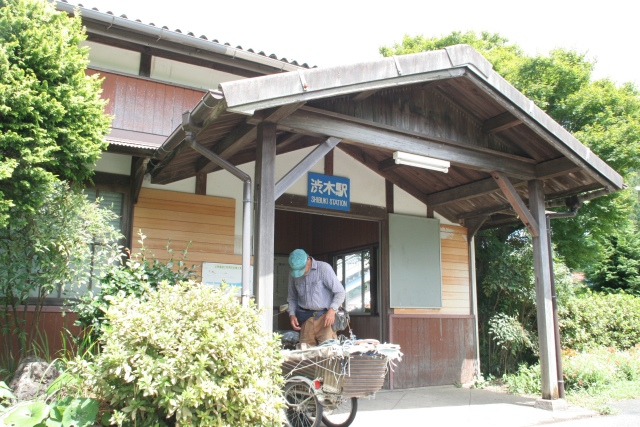
- Shibuki Station in August 2007

General information
- Location: 1786 Hatagawachi, Fukagawa Yumoto, Nagato-shi, Yamaguchi-ken 759-4104; Japan
- Coordinates: 34°18′41.96″N 131°11′47.29″E
- Owner: West Japan Railway Company
- Operator: West Japan Railway Company
- Line: Mine Line
- Distance: 37.1 km (23.1 miles) from Asa
- Platforms: 2 side platforms
- Tracks: 2
- Connections: Bus stop

Construction
- Structure type: At grade

Other information
- Status: Unstaffed
- Website: Official website

History
- Opened: 23 March 1924; 102 years ago

Passengers
- FY2020: 6

Services
Preceding station	JR West	Following station
Ofuku towards Asa	Mine Line	Nagato-Yumoto towards Nagatoshi
Location
- Location within Yamaguchi Prefecture Location within Japan

Shibuki Station (渋木駅, Shibuki-eki) is a passenger railway station located in the city of Nagato, Yamaguchi Prefecture, Japan. It is operated by the West Japan Railway Company (JR West).

== Lines ==
Shibuki Station is served by the JR West Mine Line, and is located 37.1 kilometers from the junction of the San'yō Main Line at Asa.

== Station layout ==
The station consists of two opposed ground-level unnumbered side platforms, connected by a footbridge. The station is unattended.

== Platforms ==
station side	■ Mine Line	for Nagatoshi and Senzaki
opposite side	■ Mine Line	for Mine and Asa

== History ==
Shibuki Station was opened on 23 March 1924 with the opening of the Mine Line between Ofuku Station and Masaakishi Station (now Nagatoshi Station) . With the privatization of the Japan National Railway (JNR) on 1 April 1987, the station came under the aegis of the West Japan railway Company (JR West). The station was out of operation from 15 July 2010 to 26 September 2011 due to damage cased by flooding of the Asa River due to heavy rains.

== Passenger statistics ==
In fiscal 2020, the station was used by an average of 6 passengers daily.

== Surrounding area ==
- Nagato Municipal Ohata Elementary School

== See also ==
- List of railway stations in Japan
