= Nagato-Yumoto Station =

Railway station in Mine, Yamaguchi Prefecture, Japan

Nagato-Yumoto Station 長門湯本駅
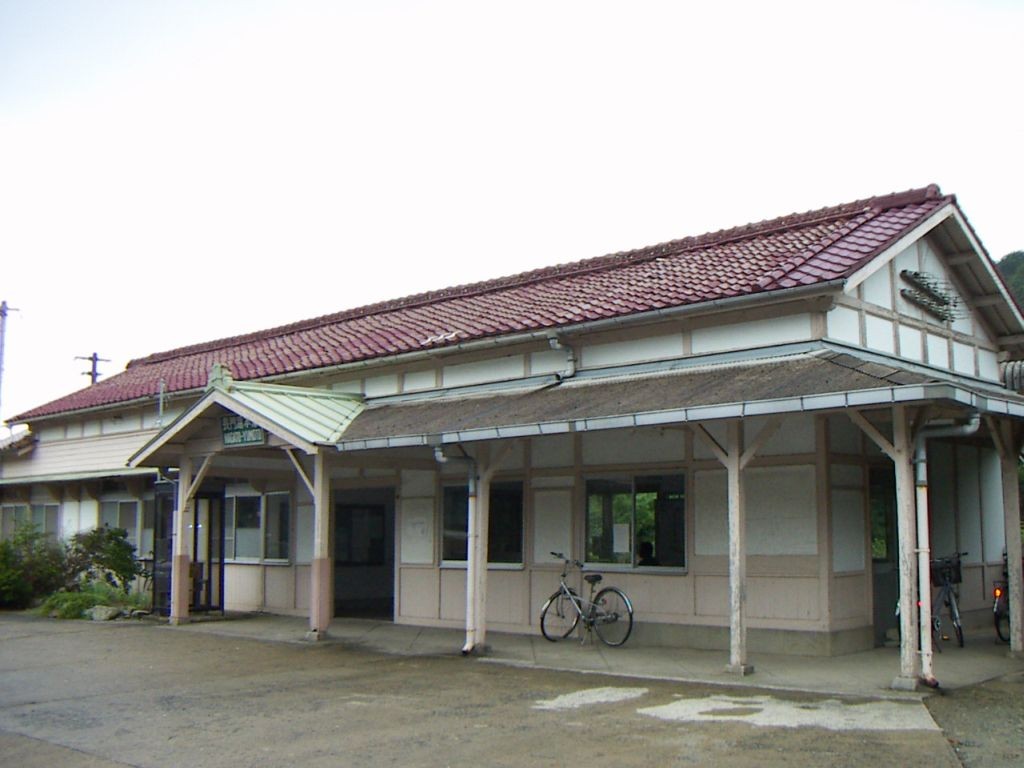
- Nagato-Yumoto Station in August 2005

General information
- Location: 872 Mitanda, Fukagawa Yumoto, Nagato-shi, Yamaguchi-ken 759-4103; Japan
- Coordinates: 34°20′4.18″N 131°10′20.78″E
- Owner: West Japan Railway Company
- Operator: West Japan Railway Company
- Line: Mine Line
- Distance: 40.1 km (24.9 miles) from Asa
- Platforms: 1 side platform
- Tracks: 1
- Connections: Bus stop

Construction
- Structure type: At grade

Other information
- Status: Unstaffed
- Website: Official website

History
- Opened: 23 March 1924; 102 years ago

Passengers
- FY2020: 11

Services
Preceding station	JR West	Following station
Shibuki towards Asa	Mine Line	Itamochi towards Nagatoshi
Location
- Location within Yamaguchi Prefecture Location within Japan

Nagato-Yumoto Station (長門湯本駅, Nagato-Yumoto-eki) is a passenger railway station located in the city of Nagato, Yamaguchi Prefecture, Japan. It is operated by the West Japan Railway Company (JR West).

== Lines ==
Nagato-Yumoto Station is served by the JR West Mine Line, and is located 41.0 kilometers from the junction of the San'yō Main Line at Asa.

== Station layout ==
The station consists of one ground-level side platform serving a single bi-direction track. The station originally had two opposed side platforms, but one of the platforms has been discontinued and is now used as a flower bed. The station is unattended.

== History ==
Nagato-Yumoto Station was opened on 23 March 1924 with the opening of the Mine Line between Ofuku Station and Masaakishi Station (now Nagatoshi Station) . With the privatization of the Japan National Railway (JNR) on 1 April 1987, the station came under the aegis of the West Japan railway Company (JR West). The station was out of operation from 15 July 2010 to 26 September 2011 due to damage cased by flooding of the Asa River due to heavy rains.

== Passenger statistics ==
In fiscal 2020, the station was used by an average of 11 passengers daily.

== Surrounding area ==
The hot spring town of Nagato Yumoto Onsen is about 500 meters north (about 5 minutes on foot).

== See also ==
- List of railway stations in Japan
