= Minami-Ōmine Station =

Railway station in Mine, Yamaguchi Prefecture, Japan

Minami-Ōmine Station 南大嶺駅
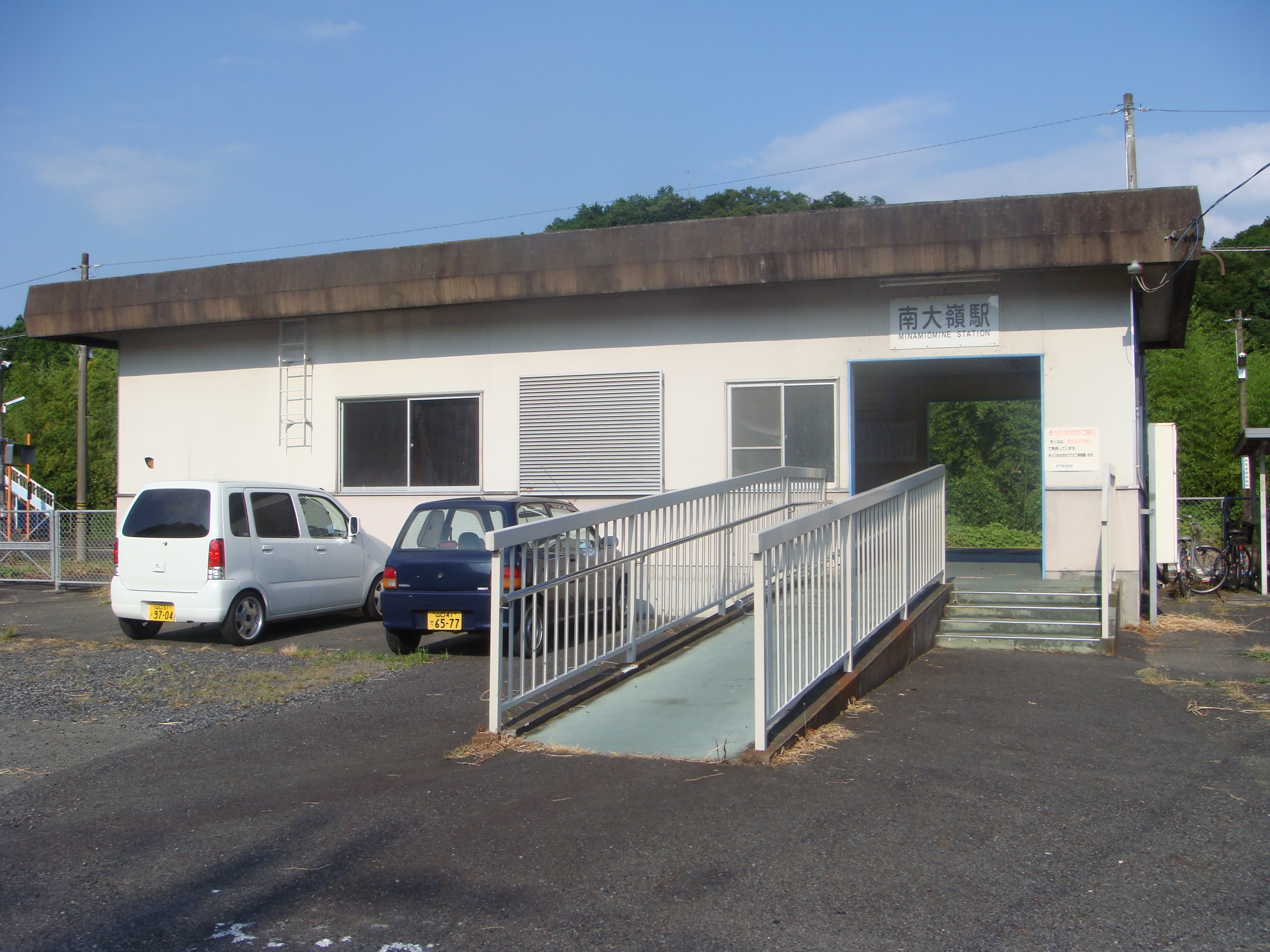
- Minami-Ōmine Station in July 2008

General information
- Location: 189 Sofugase, Nishibun, Omine-cho, Mine-shi, Yamaguchi-ken 759-2213; Japan
- Coordinates: 34°9′41.59″N 131°11′6.29″E
- Owner: West Japan Railway Company
- Operator: West Japan Railway Company
- Line: Mine Line
- Distance: 16.0 km (9.9 miles) from Asa
- Platforms: 1 side + 1 island platforms
- Tracks: 3
- Connections: Bus stop

Construction
- Structure type: At grade

Other information
- Status: Unstaffed
- Website: Official website

History
- Opened: 13 September 1905
- Former names: Isa Station (to 1949)

Passengers
- FY2020: 7

Services
| Preceding station | JR West | Following station |
|---|---|---|
| Shirōgahara towards Asa | Mine Line | Mine towards Nagatoshi |
Location
- Location within Yamaguchi Prefecture Location within Japan

Minami-Ōmine Station (南大嶺駅, Minami-Ōmine-eki) is a passenger railway station located in the city of Mine, Yamaguchi Prefecture, Japan. It is operated by the West Japan Railway Company (JR West).

== Lines ==
Minami-Ōmine Station is served by the JR West Mine Line, and is located 16.9 kilometers from the terminus of the line at Asa. The station formerly served as the terminus of the now-defunct 2.8 kilometer spur line to Ōmine Station, which was discontinued in 1997.

== Station layout ==
The station consists of one island platform and one side platform. The station building is located on the side platform side, and both platforms are connected by a footbridge. Formerly the side platform (Platform 1) was used for the Ōmine branch line, but after the line was abolished track 1 was filled in, and the side platform was extended to the position facing the track 2. As a result, Platform 1 is now missing, and Platform 2 was sandwiched between platforms on both sides. Currently, the side platform of the old Platform 1 used for outbound trains, and the island platform is exclusively for inbound trains departing from and arriving at Platform 3. The station is unattended.

== Platforms ==
| station side | ■ Mine Line | for Mine and Nagatoshi |
| opposite side | ■ Mine Line | for Asa |

== History ==
Minami-Ōmine Station was opened on 13 September 1905 as Isa Station (伊佐駅) with the opening of the San'yō Railway between Asa Station and Ōmine Station. The San'yō Railway was nationalized in 1906, and the line became the Ōmine Line in 1909, and the Mine Line from 1963. The station was renamed on 1 January 1949. With the privatization of the Japan National Railway (JNR) on 1 April 1987, the station came under the aegis of the West Japan railway Company (JR West).

== Passenger statistics ==
In fiscal 2020, the station was used by an average of 7 passengers daily.

== Surrounding area ==
- Yamaguchi Prefectural Route 33 Shimonoseki-Mine Line
- Asa River

== See also ==
- List of railway stations in Japan
