= Itamochi Station =

Railway station in Mine, Yamaguchi Prefecture, Japan

Itamochi Station 板持駅
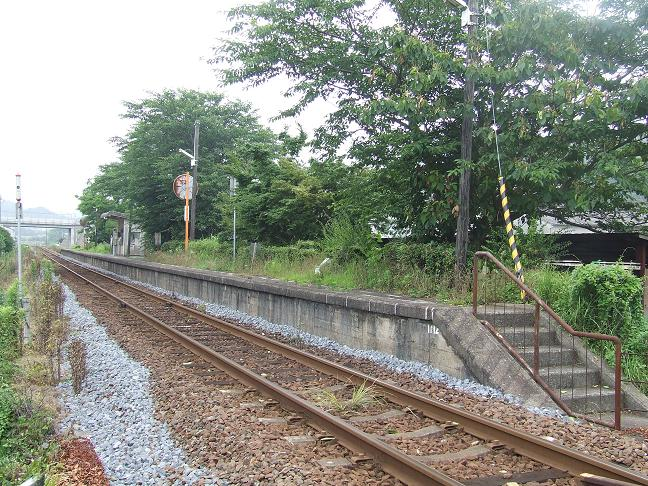
- Itamochi Station in June 2007

General information
- Location: 124 Tateno, Fukawayumoto, Nagato-shi, Yamaguchi-ken 759-4102; Japan
- Coordinates: 34°21′12.16″N 131°10′35.46″E
- Owner: West Japan Railway Company
- Operator: West Japan Railway Company
- Line: Mine Line
- Distance: 43.3 km (26.9 miles) from Asa
- Platforms: 1 side platform
- Tracks: 1
- Connections: Bus stop

Construction
- Structure type: At grade

Other information
- Status: Unstaffed
- Website: Official website

History
- Opened: 25 July 1958

Passengers
- FY2020: 6

Services
| Preceding station | JR West | Following station |
|---|---|---|
| Nagato-Yumoto towards Asa | Mine Line | Nagatoshi Terminus |
Location
- Location within Yamaguchi Prefecture Location within Japan

Itamochi Station (板持駅, Itamochi-eki) is a passenger railway station located in the city of Nagato, Yamaguchi Prefecture, Japan. It is operated by the West Japan Railway Company (JR West).

== Lines ==
Itamochi Station is served by the JR West Mine Line, and is located 43.3 kilometers from the junction of the San'yō Main Line at Asa.

== Station layout ==
The station consists of one ground-level side platform serving a single bi-directional track. There is no station building and the station is unattended.

== History ==
Itamochi Station was opened on 25 July 1958. With the privatization of the Japan National Railway (JNR) on 1 April 1987, the station came under the aegis of the West Japan railway Company (JR West). The station was out of operation from 15 July 2010 to 26 September 2011 due to damage cased by flooding of the Asa River due to heavy rains.

== Passenger statistics ==
In fiscal 2020, the station was used by an average of 6 passengers daily.

== Surrounding area ==
- Japan National Route 316

== See also ==
- List of railway stations in Japan
