= Shigeyasu Station =

Railway station in Mine, Yamaguchi Prefecture, Japan

Shigeyasu Station 重安駅
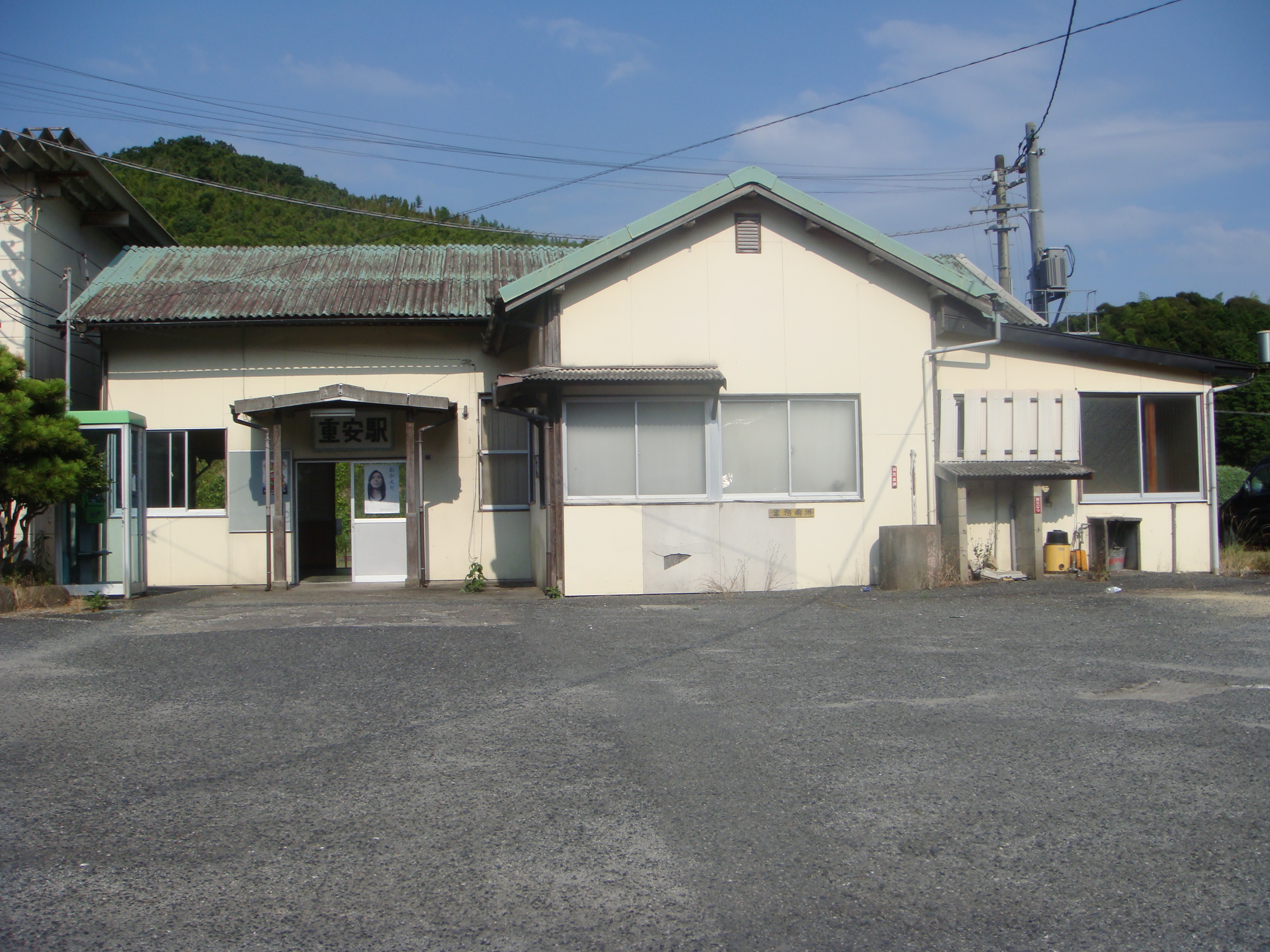
- Shigeyasu Station in July 2008

General information
- Location: 656 Yamazaki, Kitabun, Omine-cho, Mine-shi, Yamaguchi-ken 759-2211; Japan
- Coordinates: 34°11′39.46″N 131°12′30.61″E
- Owner: West Japan Railway Company
- Operator: West Japan Railway Company
- Line: Mine Line
- Distance: 22.3 km (13.9 miles) from Asa
- Platforms: 1 island platforms
- Tracks: 2
- Connections: Bus stop

Construction
- Structure type: At grade

Other information
- Status: Unstaffed
- Website: Official website

History
- Opened: 15 September 1916

Passengers
- FY2020: 4

Services
| Preceding station | JR West | Following station |
|---|---|---|
| Mine towards Asa | Mine Line | Ofuku towards Nagatoshi |
Location
- Location within Yamaguchi Prefecture Location within Japan

Shigeyasu Station (重安駅, Shigeyasu-eki) is a passenger railway station located in the city of Mine, Yamaguchi Prefecture, Japan. It is operated by the West Japan Railway Company (JR West).

== Lines ==
Shigeyasu Station is served by the JR West Mine Line and is located 22.3 kilometers from the junction of the San'yō Main Line at Asa.

== Station layout ==
The station consists of one ground-level island platform, connected to the station building by a level crossing. The station is unattended.

== Platforms ==
| 2 | ■ Mine Line | for Nagatoshi |
| 3 | ■ Mine Line | for Mine and Asa |

== History ==
Shigeyasu Station was opened on 15 September 1916. With the privatization of the Japan National Railway (JNR) on 1 April 1987, the station came under the aegis of the West Japan railway Company (JR West). The station building was renovated in 2013.

== Passenger statistics ==
In fiscal 2020, the station was used by an average of 4 passengers daily.

== Surrounding area ==
- Japan National Route 316

== See also ==
- List of railway stations in Japan
