= Shibuki =

Shibuki may refer to:

- Ayano Shibuki, Japanese volleyball player
- Jun Shibuki, Japanese actress
- Shibuki Station, a train station in Yamaguchi Prefecture, Japan
