= Senzaki =

Senzaki (written: 先崎 or 千崎) is a Japanese surname. Notable people with the surname include:

- Manabu Senzaki (先崎 学, born 1970), Japanese shogi player
- Nyogen Senzaki (千崎 如幻, 1876–1958), Japanese Zen Buddhist

== See also ==
- Senzaki Station, a railway station in Nagato, Yamaguchi Prefecture, Japan
