= Shigeyasu =

- Gender: Male

Origin
- Origin: Japanese
- Meaning: Different meanings depending on the kanji used

Shigeyasu (written: 重保 or 重康) is a masculine Japanese given name. Notable people with the name include:

- Hatakeyama Shigeyasu (畠山 六郎 重保; died 1205), Japanese warrior
- Shigeyasu Suzuki (鈴木 重康; 1886–1957), Japanese general

== See also ==
- Shigeyasu Station, a railway station in Mine, Yamaguchi Prefecture, Japan
