= Naganobori Copper Mine =

Former mine in Japan

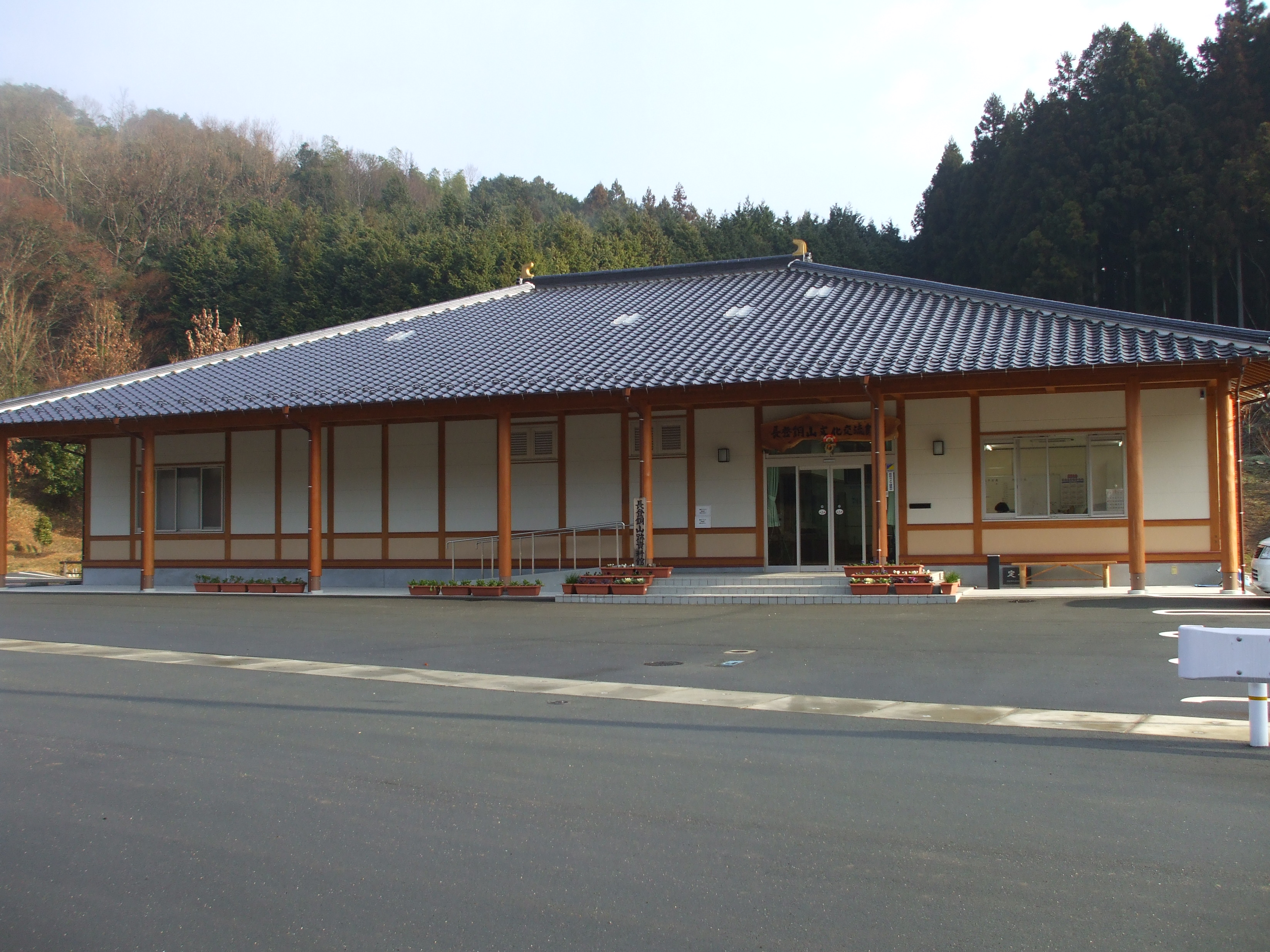
- Nagato Copper Mine Cultural Exchange Center

- Location within Yamaguchi Prefecture Location within Japan
- Location: Mine, Yamaguchi, Japan; 34°14′41.8″N 131°20′10.0″E
- Products: Copper. Cobalt
- Opened: Nara period
- Closed: 1962
- National Historic Site of Japan

The Naganobori Copper Mine (長登銅山, Naganobori dōzan ato) was a copper mine located in the city of Mine, Yamaguchi, in the western Japan. Situated southeast of the Akiyoshidai Quasi-National Park, the Naganobori Copper Mine site is dotted with mining and smelting remains dating from the Nara period to the 20th century, within an area of 1.6 kilometers east–west and 2 kilometers north–south. Of these, the Otetsudani area of approximately 353,000 square meters, surrounded by the ridges of Hanayama, Kayagabayama, and Futatsumabu, was designated a National Historic Site in 2003.

== History ==
Copper mining and smelting begin around Akiyoshidai area in the late seventh century, and there is a local legend that name is a corruption of "Naranobori" (meaning to go up to Nara, as copper from this mine was used to make the Nara Daibutsu. In 1972, Sue ware pottery from the seventh century was found in the area and in 1988 an analysis of a bronze ingot unearthed during the excavation of the Daibutsuden of Tōdai-ji revealed that it had indeed been made from materials from this mine. Archaeological excavations over a ten-year investigation starting in 1989 uncovered numerous artifacts, including mining and smelting sites, as well as mokkan wooden tablets dated 726 or 711), confirming it as the oldest known copper mine site in Japan.

From the Nara to the Heian period, it was a directly managed by Nagato Province, with significant involvement from the central government and produced both copper and lead. Historical records indicate that the mine came under control of the central government form 856 to 869 and that in 958 the last of domestically produced coins of the Heian period, the Kengen Taihō (ja:乾元大宝), was made at the nearby Suō Mint using copper from the Naganobori Copper Mine The mine ceased operations in the 11th-12th centuries with the breakdown in the authority of the central government, but resumed production in the late 14th to 15th centuries. In the Edo Period, the mine was a major revenue source for Chōshū Domain, but experienced problems with water seepage in 1637. With the technological limitations of the time, output dropped, and its management was taken over by a guild of copper merchants from Osaka from the late 17th to early 18th centuries. As the copper veins became exhausted, the main product of the mine became verdigris, which was used as a pigment.

Following the Meiji restoration and the introduction of western mining technology, the mine was developed further using private capital, and cobalt ore was also discovered in 1908. Due to the decline in copper prices following the end of World War I and torrential rains, the mine was closed in 1919, only to reopen in 1932 as demand for copper soared due to the need for copper wires for electrical transmission and for the increasing militarization of Japan. In 1960, operated ceased due to flooding and in 1962 mine was officially closed.

At present, the Nagato Copper Mine Cultural Exchange Center displays pottery, ore, and wooden tablets unearthed during the excavation.

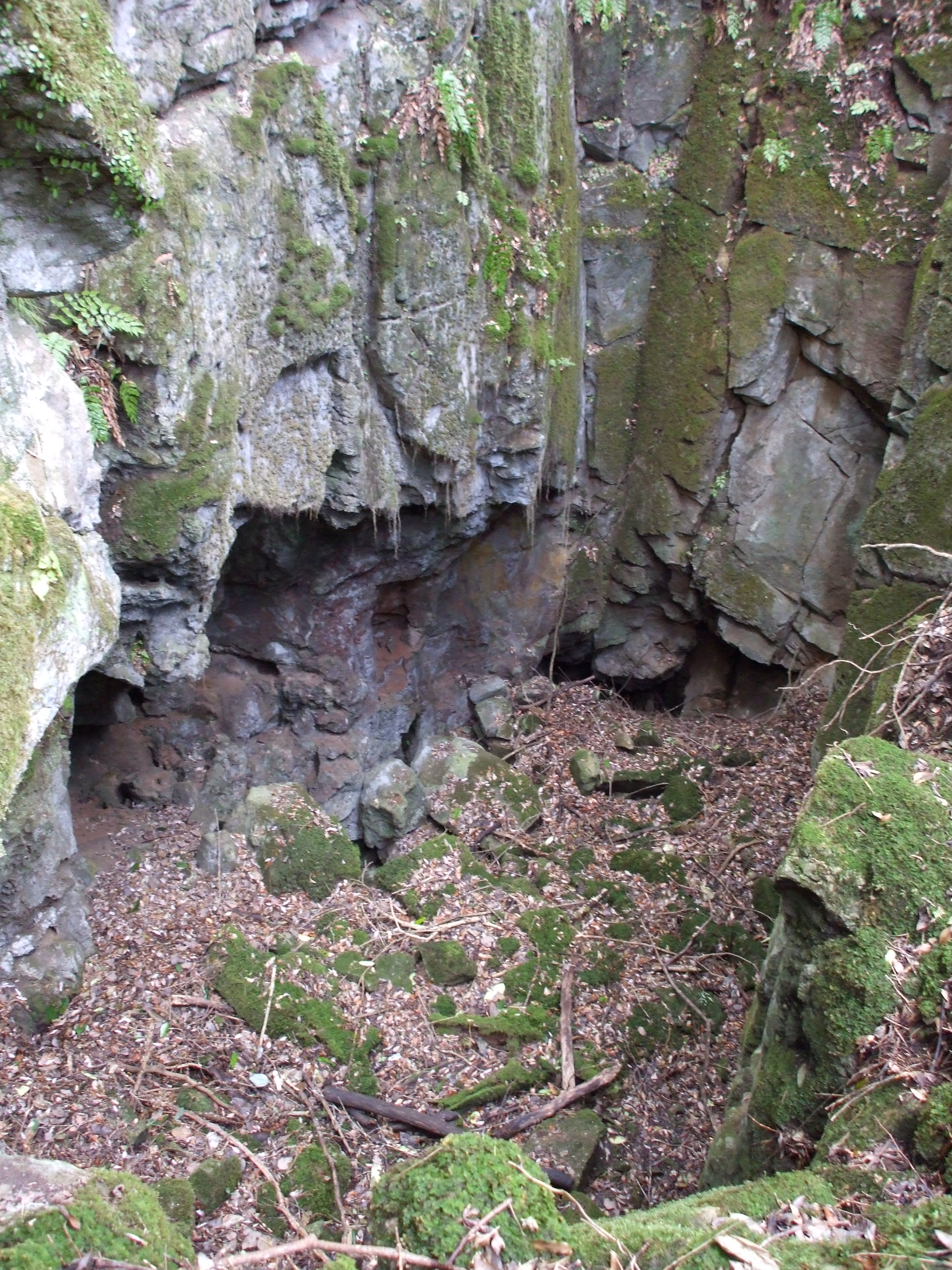
The Kayagabayama No. 1 open-pit mine site is located directly below the summit of Kayagabayama.

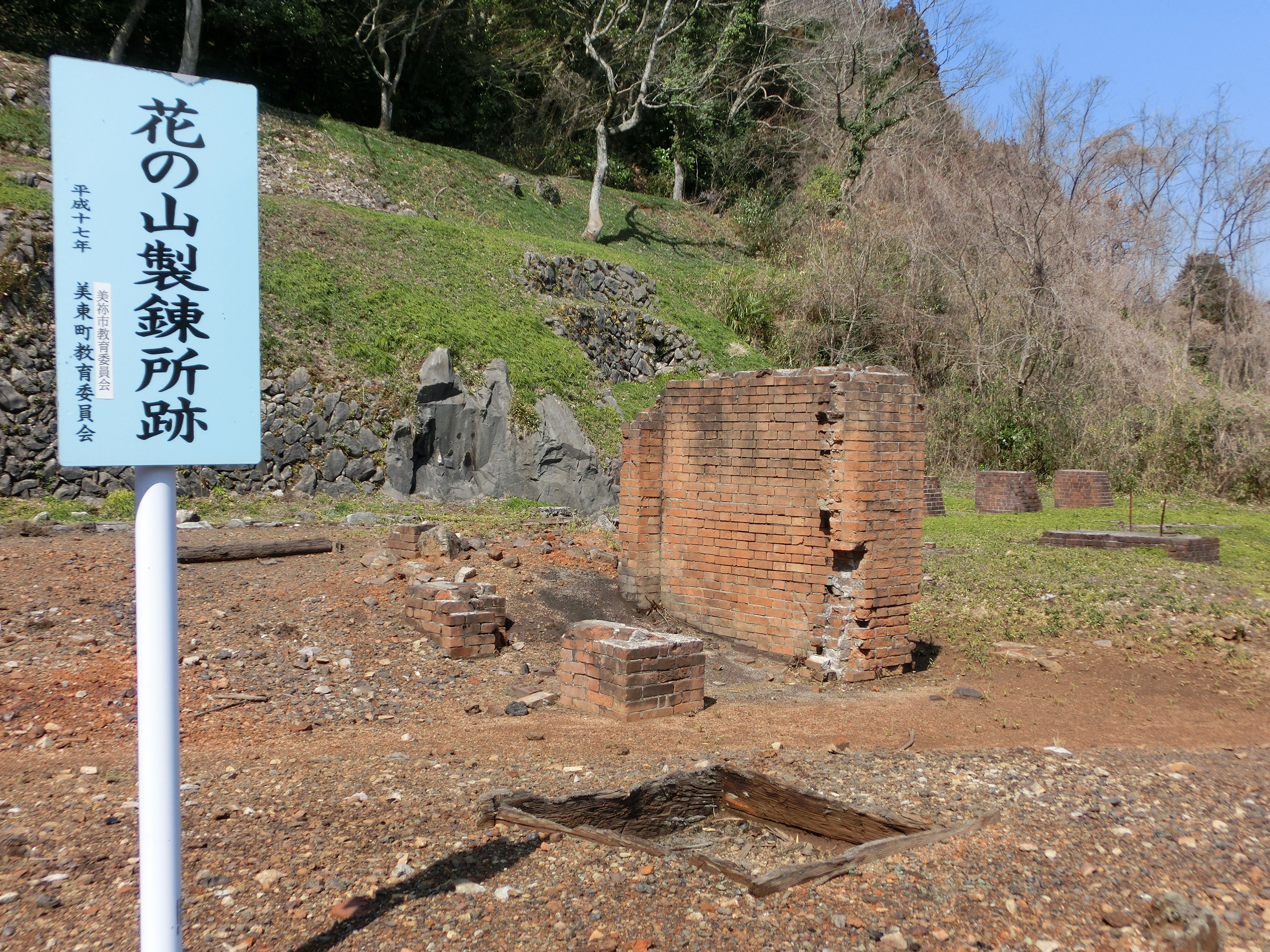
Naganobori Copper Mine Ruins

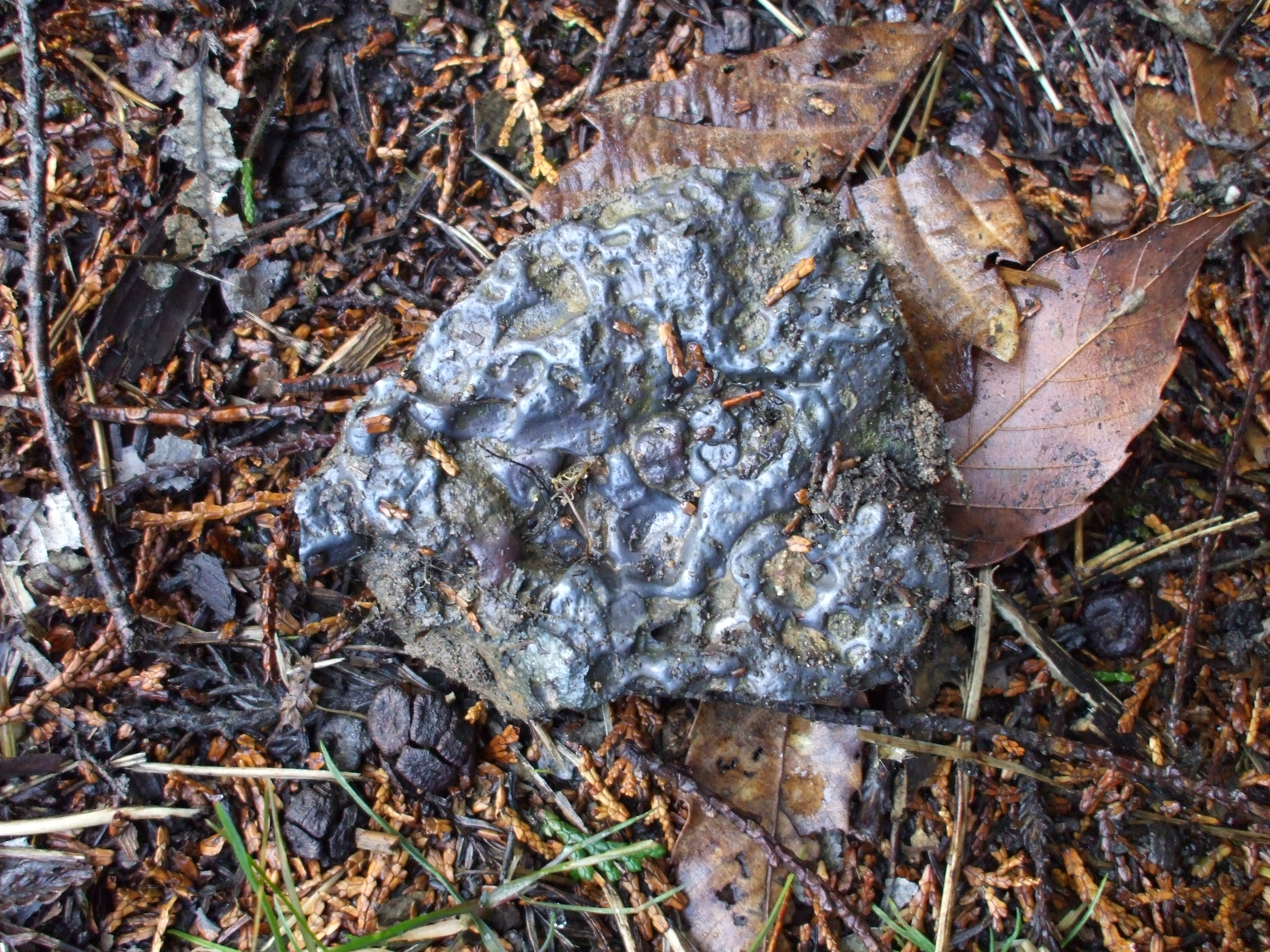
Slag from Naganobori Copper Mine smelters

== See also ==
- List of Historic Sites of Japan (Yamaguchi)
