= Mine, Yamaguchi =

Mine 美祢市
- City
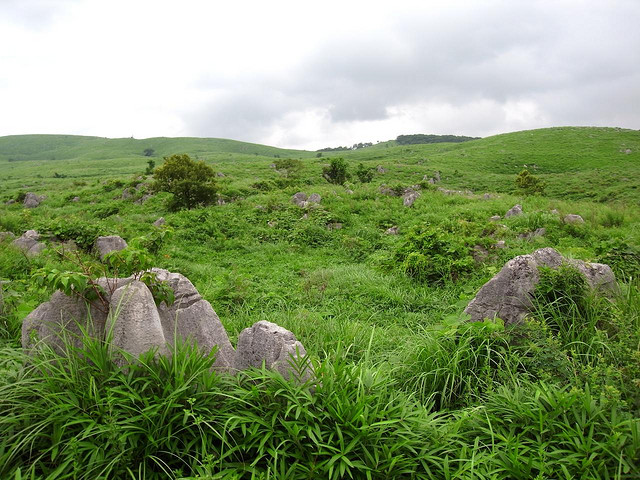
- Karst landscape of Akiyoshidai

- Flag Emblem
- Interactive map of Mine
- Location in Japan
- Coordinates: 34°09′47″N 131°12′30″E
- Country: Japan
- Region: Chūgoku (San'yō)
- Prefecture: Yamaguchi

Government
  - Mayor: Yōji Shinoda (since April 2020)

Area
  - Total: 472.64 km^{2} (182.49 sq mi)

Population (April 1, 2023)
  - Total: 21,919
  - Density: 46.376/km^{2} (120.11/sq mi)
- Time zone: UTC+09:00 (JST)
- City hall address: 326-1 Higashi-bun, Ōmine-chō, Mine-shi, Yamaguchi-ken 759-2292
- Climate: Cfa
- Website: Official website
- Symbols
- Flower: Cherry blossom
- Tree: Live oak

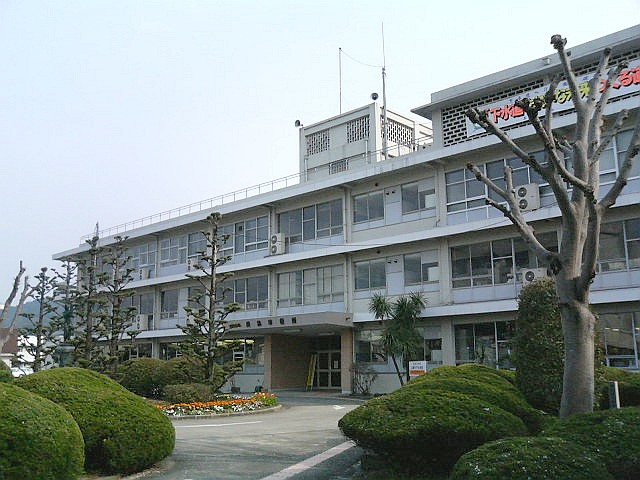
Mine city hall

Mine (美祢市, Mine-shi) is a city located in Yamaguchi Prefecture, Japan. As of 1 April 2023, the city had an estimated population of 21,919 in 10661 households and a population density of 46 persons per km^{2}. The total area of the city is 1,472.64 square kilometres (568.59 sq mi).

== Geography ==
San'yō-Onoda is located in the southwestern part of Yamaguchi Prefecture. It is long in the north-south direction and has a fan shape that opens to the Seto Inland Sea. The Asa River flows from the north to the central area, and the Ariho River flows from the northeast to the east, flowing south into the Seto Inland Sea. The city hall is located on the west bank of the Ariho River mouth.

=== Neighbouring municipalities ===
Yamaguchi Prefecture

- Hagi
- San'yō-Onoda
- Shimonoseki
- Ube
- Yamaguchi

=== Climate ===
Mine has a humid subtropical climate (Köppen climate classification Cfa) with hot summers and cool winters. Precipitation is significant throughout the year, but is much higher in summer than in winter. The average annual temperature in Mine is 13.9 °C (57.0 °F). The average annual rainfall is 2,003.3 mm (78.87 in) with July as the wettest month. The temperatures are highest on average in August, at around 25.2 °C (77.4 °F), and lowest in January, at around 3.0 °C (37.4 °F). The highest temperature ever recorded in Mine was 36.1 °C (97.0 °F) on 27 July 2026; the coldest temperature ever recorded was −10.1 °C (13.8 °F) on 3 February 2012.

Climate data for Akiyoshidai, Mine (1991−2020 normals, extremes 1977−present)
Month	Jan	Feb	Mar	Apr	May	Jun	Jul	Aug	Sep	Oct	Nov	Dec	Year
Record high °C (°F)	16.5 (61.7)	21.0 (69.8)	25.7 (78.3)	28.8 (83.8)	31.3 (88.3)	33.1 (91.6)	36.1 (97.0)	35.8 (96.4)	34.1 (93.4)	29.4 (84.9)	26.1 (79.0)	20.4 (68.7)	36.1 (97.0)
Mean daily maximum °C (°F)	7.3 (45.1)	8.6 (47.5)	12.3 (54.1)	17.9 (64.2)	22.4 (72.3)	26.0 (78.8)	28.6 (83.5)	29.9 (85.8)	25.9 (78.6)	20.8 (69.4)	15.4 (59.7)	9.8 (49.6)	18.7 (65.7)
Daily mean °C (°F)	3.0 (37.4)	4.0 (39.2)	7.4 (45.3)	12.5 (54.5)	16.9 (62.4)	20.4 (68.7)	24.2 (75.6)	25.2 (77.4)	21.3 (70.3)	15.8 (60.4)	10.3 (50.5)	5.2 (41.4)	13.9 (56.9)
Mean daily minimum °C (°F)	−1.3 (29.7)	−0.6 (30.9)	2.9 (37.2)	7.6 (45.7)	12.0 (53.6)	16.5 (61.7)	20.9 (69.6)	21.7 (71.1)	17.6 (63.7)	11.4 (52.5)	5.6 (42.1)	0.8 (33.4)	9.6 (49.3)
Record low °C (°F)	−9.5 (14.9)	−10.1 (13.8)	−5.7 (21.7)	−1.2 (29.8)	3.7 (38.7)	7.6 (45.7)	14.0 (57.2)	14.4 (57.9)	6.2 (43.2)	0.6 (33.1)	−3.2 (26.2)	−7.1 (19.2)	−10.1 (13.8)
Average precipitation mm (inches)	95.5 (3.76)	91.4 (3.60)	147.7 (5.81)	159.6 (6.28)	187.4 (7.38)	283.0 (11.14)	344.0 (13.54)	204.4 (8.05)	196.5 (7.74)	106.3 (4.19)	91.3 (3.59)	84.0 (3.31)	2,003.3 (78.87)
Average precipitation days (≥ 1.0 mm)	12.8	11.4	12.5	10.6	9.9	12.4	11.6	9.7	10.2	8.5	9.5	11.7	130.8
Mean monthly sunshine hours	102.7	112.5	155.4	180.6	204.3	133.0	143.2	183.9	154.1	170.6	138.0	109.1	1,787.4
Source: Japan Meteorological Agency

== Demographics ==
Per Japanese census data, the population of Mine in 2020 is 23,247 people. Mine has been conducting censuses since 1920.

Historical population
Year	Pop.	±%
1920	41,979	—
1925	42,587	+1.4%
1930	43,302	+1.7%
1935	42,782	−1.2%
1940	47,623	+11.3%
1945	57,936	+21.7%
1950	60,044	+3.6%
1955	61,870	+3.0%
1960	60,322	−2.5%
1965	52,366	−13.2%
1970	43,741	−16.5%
1975	37,670	−13.9%
1980	36,907	−2.0%
1985	35,730	−3.2%
1990	33,532	−6.2%
1995	32,396	−3.4%
2000	31,546	−2.6%
2005	29,839	−5.4%
2010	28,645	−4.0%
2015	26,159	−8.7%
2020	23,247	−11.1%
Mine population statistics

== Geology ==
The plateau consists of uplifted reef limestones of Paleozoic age, which were thickened by overfolding during the Akiyoshidai orogenic movement. Subsequent erosion has created an undulating karst landscape dimpled with many dolines and countless limestone pinnacles up to two meters in height. Beneath the surface lie hundreds of caves, a few of them quite significant geologically.

Numerous fossils of Pleistocene age have been found in these caves, including those of the Japanese rhinoceros, Stegodont elephant, Naumann elephant, Young tiger, and numerous other animals from the last interglacial period.

The area around Akiyoshidai was once heavily forested about 500,000 years ago. In the Jōmon period, the area served as a hunting ground and the bottoms of sinkholes as vegetable fields. Numerous Japanese Paleolithic artifacts have been recovered. As farming began in Japan, the local people eventually replaced the forested landscape with Japanese pampas grass for feeding their animals and thatching houses. Repeated cycles of burning the grass have kept trees from growing back since.

== History ==
The area of Mine was part of ancient Nagato Province and was part of Chōshū Domain under the Edo Period Tokugawa shogunate. After the Meiji restoration, the area was divided into 13 villages within Mine District, Yamaguchi with the creation of the modern municipalities system. The village of Ota was raised to village status on August 1, 1923, followed by Isa on January 1, 1924 and Omine on May 1, 1939. The city of Mine was created by the merger of Isa and Omine with the villages of Ofuku, Nishiatsu and Higashiatsu on March 31, 1954. On October 1 of the same year, the town of Ota merged with the villages of Ayagi, Managata Agago to form the town of Mitō. The remainder of the district was consolidated into the town of Shūhō on April 1, 1955. On March 21, 2008, Mine absorbed Mitō and Shūhō, and the newly merged city retained the name, Mine.

== Government ==
Mine has a mayor-council form of government with a directly elected mayor and a unicameral city council of 16 members. Mine contributes one member to the Yamaguchi Prefectural Assembly. In terms of national politics, the city is part of the Yamaguchi 3rd district of the lower house of the Diet of Japan.

== Economy ==
Mine was noted from ancient times for its copper mines with the Naganobori Copper Mine supplying the copper used in the construction of the Nara Daibutsu and Nara period Wadōkaichin coins. Mine developed as an industrial city due to the production of anthracite and limestone from the Ōmine Coal Field after the Meiji Restoration. After the mines were closed, the population decreased sharply and the city has been active in attracting industrial parks.

Tourism centered on Akiyoshidai Quasi-National Park is also a major component of the local economy.

== Education ==
Mine has 12 public elementary school and six public junior high schools operated by the city government, and one public high school operated by the Yamaguchi Prefectural Board of Education. There are also one private high school.

== Transportation ==
=== Railway ===
JR West (JR West) - Mine Line

- Atsu - Shirōgahara - Minami-Ōmine - Mine - Shigeyasu - Ofuku

=== Highways ===
- Chugoku Expressway
- National Route 316
- National Route 435
- National Route 490

== Local attractions ==
- Akiyoshidai Quasi-National Park, which includes the Akiyoshidai (秋吉台, Akiyoshi plateau) and Japan's longest cave, the Akiyoshido (秋芳洞), the latter of which is designated a Special Natural Monument. Akiyoshidai is served by a natural history museum, visitor center, rest house, youth hostel and park headquarters building, and is traversed by a scenic roadway and several walking trails. Events include a fireworks festival in July, a “Karst Walk” in November, and an annual burning off of dry grasses in February called “Yamayaki”. Akiyoshidai Quasi-National Park is situated within the Mine-Akiyoshidai Karst Plateau Geopark.
- Akiyoshido, Akiyoshido (秋芳洞). Towards the southern end of Akiyoshidai is the Akiyoshido cave, named by emperor Hirohito on May 30, 1926 when he was still crown prince. This spacious cave is up to 100 meters wide and has 8.79 kilometers of passages, making it the longest in Japan and one of the longest in Asia. At the present time an approximately one-kilometer-long section of the cave is open to the public as a sightseeing course, with a walkway and bridge system, entering at the cave's lowest point and exiting via an artificial elevator. This portion of the cave is also well decorated with a variety of large and colorful speleothems.
- Mine-Akiyoshidai Karst Plateau Geopark
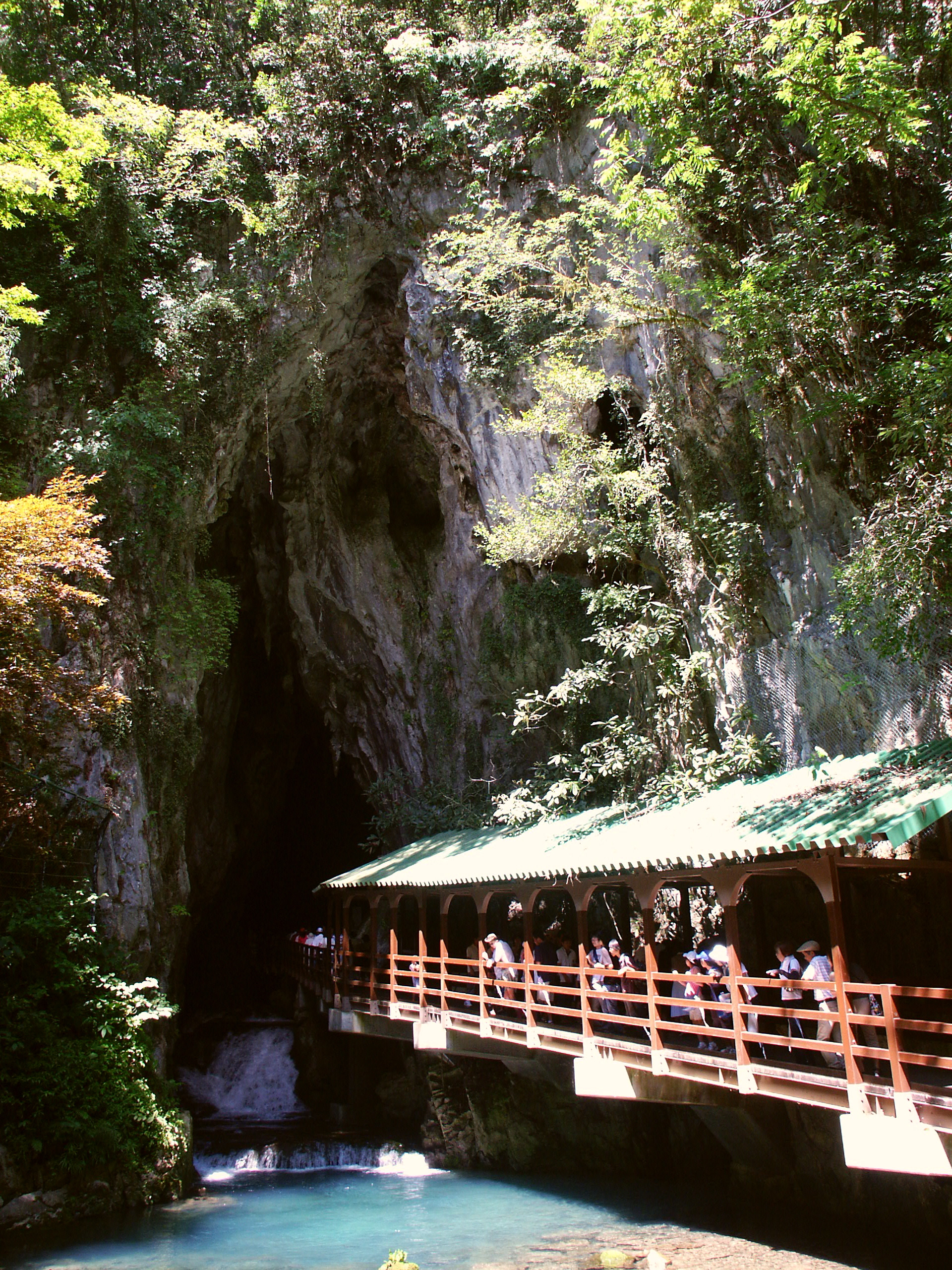
Akiyoshi-do cave

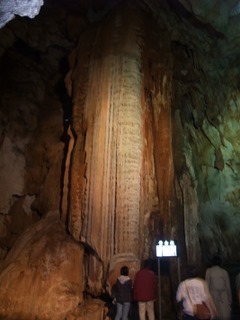
Stalactite called "Gold Column"

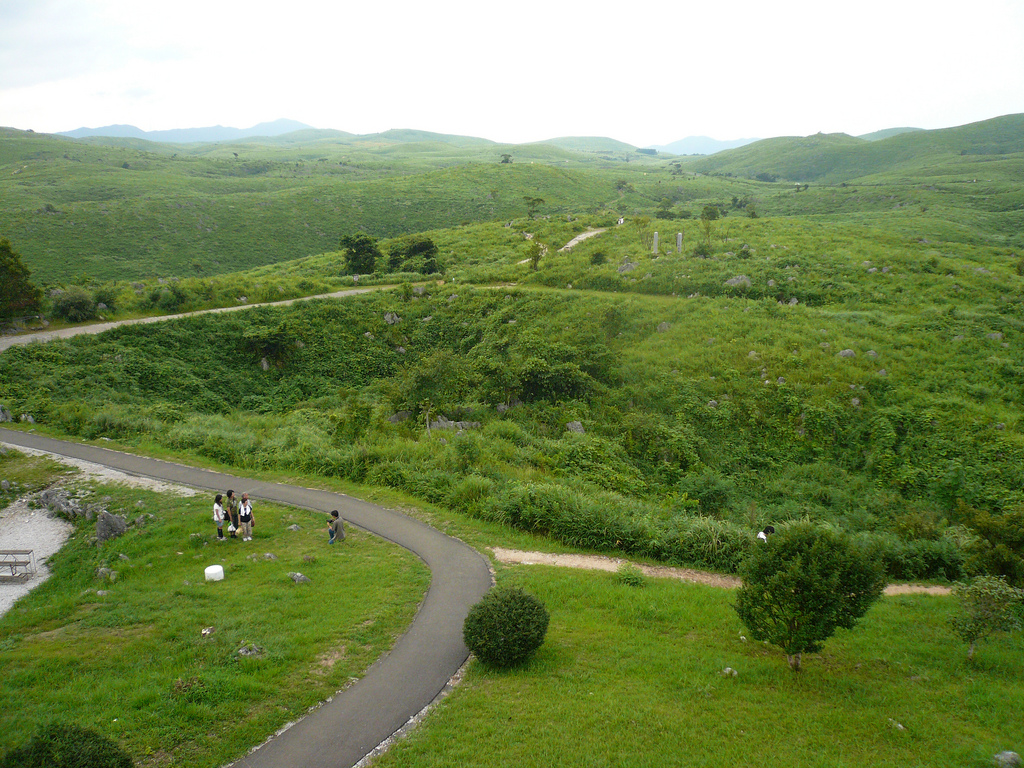
View of Karst landscape

== Notable people from Mine ==
- Mayu Iwatani, acclaimed professional wrestler with World Wonder Ring Stardom and Ring of Honor
- Sekinari Nii, former governor of Yamaguchi Prefecture
- Kazuaki Okazaki, executed convicted murderer and former member of Aum Shinrikyo (Sakamoto family murder and Tokyo subway sarin attack)
