= Shūhō, Yamaguchi =

Dissolved municipality in Yamaguchi prefecture, Japan

Coordinates: 34°13′N 131°17′E

Shūhō (秋芳町, Shūhō-chō) was a town located in Mine District, Yamaguchi Prefecture, Japan.

As of 2003, the town has an estimated population of 6,196 and a population density of 53.89 persons per km^{2}. The total area is 114.97 square kilometers.

On March 21, 2008, Shūhō, along with the town of Mitō (also from Mine District), was merged into the expanded city of Mine.

The area was known for Akiyoshi plateau and Akiyoshi cave.
