= Mine District, Yamaguchi =

Former district in Yamaguchi prefecture, Japan

Mine District (美祢郡, Mine-gun) was a district located in Yamaguchi Prefecture, Japan.

On March 20, 2008, the day before its dissolution, the district consisted solely of the towns of Mitō (美東町) and Shūhō (秋芳町).

== History ==
- April 1, 1889 - Due to the municipal status enforcement, the villages of Akagō, Akiyoshi, Ayagi, Beppu, Higashiatsu, Isa, Iwanaga, Kyōwa, Managata, Nishiatsu, Ōda, Ofuku and, Ōmine, were formed. (13 villages)
- August 1, 1923 - The village of Ōda town status to become the town of Ōda. (1 town, 12 villages)
- January 1, 1924 - The village of Isa was elevated to town status to become the town of Isa. (2 towns, 11 villages)
- May 1, 1939 - The village of Ōmine was elevated to town status to become the town of Ōmine. (3 towns, 10 villages)
- March 31, 1954 - The towns of Ōmine, Isa, and the villages of Higashiatsu, Nishiatsu and Ofuku were merged with the town of Toyotamae (from Toyoura District) to create the city of Mine while leaving Mine District. (1 town, 7 villages)
- October 1, 1954 - The towns of Ōda, Akagō, Ayagi, and Managata were merged to create the town of Mitō. (1 town, 4 villages)
- April 1, 1955 - The villages of Akiyoshi, Iwanaga, Beppu and Kyōwa were merged to create the town of Shūhō. (2 towns)
- March 21, 2008 - The towns of Mitō and Shūhō were merged into the expanded city of Mine. Mine District dissolved as a result of this merger.

April 1, 1889	1889 - 1944	1945 - 2008	2008–present
大田 (village)	August 1, 1923 town status	October 1, 1954; Mitō (town)	March 21, 2008; Mine City
赤郷 (village)		October 1, 1954; Mitō (town)	March 21, 2008; Mine City
綾木 (village)		October 1, 1954; Mitō (town)	March 21, 2008; Mine City
真長田 (village)		October 1, 1954; Mitō (town)	March 21, 2008; Mine City
大嶺 (village)	May 1, 1939 town status	March 31, 1954; Mine City	March 21, 2008; Mine City
伊佐 (village)	January 1, 1924 town status	March 31, 1954; Mine City	March 21, 2008; Mine City
東厚保 (village)		March 31, 1954; Mine City	March 21, 2008; Mine City
西厚保 (village)		March 31, 1954; Mine City	March 21, 2008; Mine City
於福 (village)		March 31, 1954; Mine City	March 21, 2008; Mine City
秋吉 (village)		April 1, 1955; Shūhō (town)	March 21, 2008; Mine City
岩永 (village)		April 1, 1955; Shūhō (town)	March 21, 2008; Mine City
別府 (village)		April 1, 1955; Shūhō (town)	March 21, 2008; Mine City
共和 (village)		April 1, 1955; Shūhō (town)	March 21, 2008; Mine City

== See also ==
- List of dissolved districts of Japan
