= Senzaki Station =

Railway station in Nagato, Yamaguchi Prefecture, Japan

Senzaki Station 仙崎駅
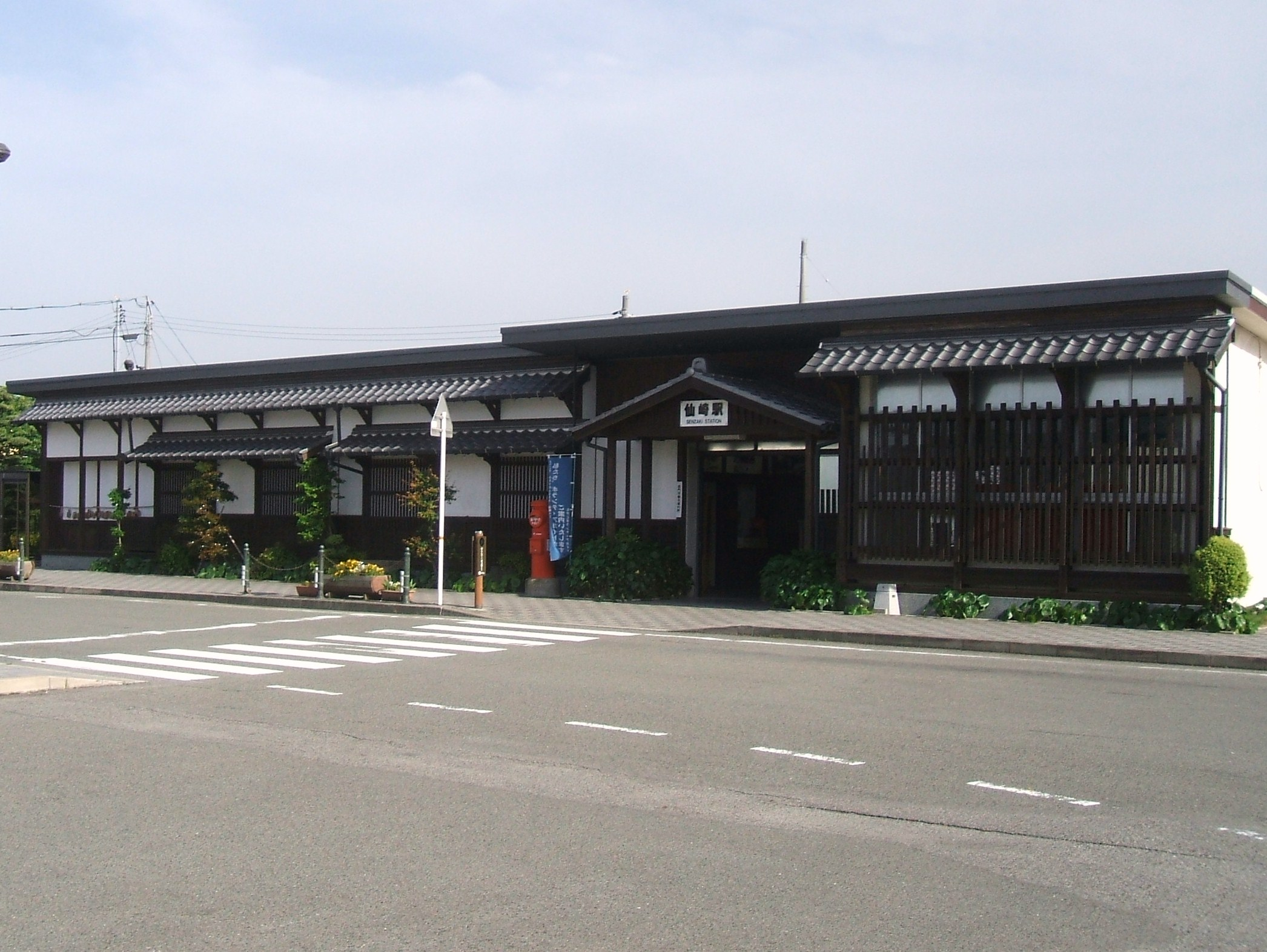
- Senzaki Station in May 2008

General information
- Location: 1115, Senzaki Shinyashiki-cho, Nagato-shi, Yamaguchi-ken 759-4106; Japan
- Coordinates: 34°23′16.54″N 131°11′56.32″E
- Owner: West Japan Railway Company
- Operator: West Japan Railway Company
- Line: San'in Main Line (Senzaki Branch Line)
- Distance: 2.2 km (1.4 miles) from Nagatoshi
- Platforms: 1 side platform
- Tracks: 1
- Connections: Bus stop

Other information
- Status: Unstaffed
- Website: Official website

History
- Opened: 15 May 1930

Passengers
- FY2020: 47

Services
Preceding station	JR West	Following station
Nagatoshi towards Shimonoseki	San'in Main Line San'in Branch Line Local	Terminus
Location
- Location within Yamaguchi Prefecture Location within Japan

Senzaki Station (仙崎駅, Senzaki-eki) is a passenger railway station located in the city of Nagato, Yamaguchi Prefecture, Japan. It is operated by the West Japan Railway Company (JR West).

== Lines ==
Senzaki Station is served by the JR West San'in Main Line (Senzaki Branch Line), and is located 2.2 kilometers from the starting point of the spur line at Nagatoshi and 48.2 kilometers from Asa Station on the Mine Line.

== Station layout ==
The station consists of one dead-headed side platform serving a single track. Traces of a railway turntable remain on the opposite side of the platform. The station is unattended, but the former station office and baggage handling space is now the "Misuzu Museum", dedicated to local poet Kaneko Misuzu.

== History ==
Senzaki Station was opened on 15 May 1930 as a freight-only station on the Japan Government Railways Mine Line. When the Mine Line was incorporated into the San'in Main Line on 24 February 1933, the station became located on a spur line of the San'in Main Line, and passenger operations commences from 26 July 1933. Freight operations were discontinued on 1 June 1963. With the privatization of the Japan National Railway (JNR) on 1 April 1987, the station came under the aegis of the West Japan railway Company (JR West).

== Passenger statistics ==
In fiscal 2020, the station was used by an average of 47 passengers daily.

== Surrounding area ==
The area around the station is the center of the Senzaki district.

- Senzaki Port
- Senzaki Regional Wholesale Market
- Omijima Sightseeing Boat Terminal
- Nagato Municipal Senzaki Elementary School

== See also ==
- List of railway stations in Japan
