= Mine Line =

Railway line in Yamaguchi prefecture, Japan

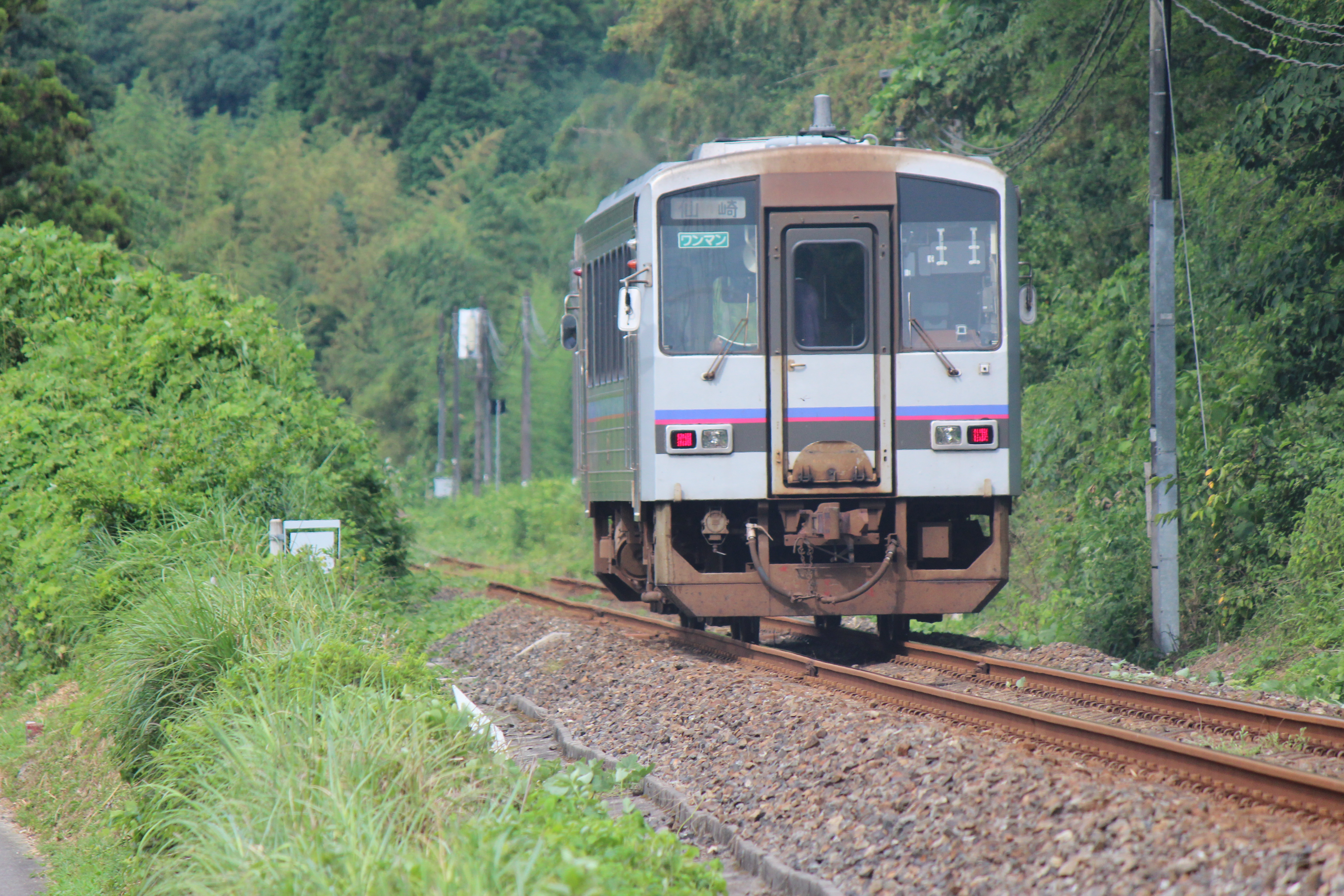
- KiHa 120 running through the line in 2012

Overview
- Native name: 美祢線
- Locale: Yamaguchi Prefecture
- Termini: Asa; Nagatoshi
- Stations: 12

Service
- Operator: JR West
- Rolling stock: KiHa 120

History
- Opened: 13 September 1905; 121 years ago
- Last extension: 23 March 1924; 102 years ago

Technical
- Line length: 46.0 km (28.6 mi)
- Num of tracks: Single-track
- Track gauge: 1,067 mm (3 ft 6 in)
- Electrification: None
- Operating speed: 85 km/h (53 mph)

The Mine Line (美祢線, Mine-sen) is a rural railway line owned and operated by the West Japan Railway Company (JR West). It connects Asa Station in San'yō-Onoda to Nagatoshi Station in Nagato, both in Yamaguchi Prefecture, Japan.

The 46.0 km (28.6 mi) line operates north-south connecting the San'in Main Line with the San'yō Main Line and San'yō Shinkansen. No other railway lines are crossed by the Mine Line.

== Conversion to BRT ==
On August 7, 2025, JR West, Yamaguchi Prefecture, Mine City, Sanyo Onoda City, and Nagato City agreed to abandon restoration of the railway line and convert the Mine Line to Bus Rapid Transit (BRT).

The only proposed section of BRT-only roadway on the line is a 4.2 km (2.6 mi) section between Yuno Pass and Koho. Reasons given for not having more BRT-only sections are that many existing roads are parallel to the railway line and traffic congestion in the area is not an issue so "express delivery and punctuality can be ensured".

== History ==
The Sanyo Railway Company opened the Asa to Minami-Omine section in 1905 to haul coal. The company was nationalised in 1906, and the Japanese Government Railway (JGR) extended the line to Mine in 1909. The Mine Light Railway Company opened the Mine to Shigeyasu section in 1916. That company was nationalised in 1920, and the JGR opened the section to Ofuku the same year. The line was extended to Nagato in 1924, completing the line. Freight services ceased in 1984, except for limestone haulage from Shigeyasu, which ceased in 2009.

All services were suspended after heavy rainstorm flooding in July 2010. Despite estimates that repairs would take up to three years to complete, the Mine Line was restored to full service on 26 September 2011, in time for the 66th National Sports Festival, "Oidemase Yamaguchi Kokutai," which began in October 2011.

Since June 2023, the Mine Line has been fully suspended due to major infrastructure damage including the collapse of the 6th Atsusa River Bridge, caused by record-breaking heavy rain on June 30 and July 1, 2023. Alternative transportation has been provided by bus.

In May 2024, JR West announced that restoration of the line as well as future operation would be very difficult without the financial support of prefectural and local governments along the line, and that daily usage of more than 2,000 passengers was required to effectively restore and operate the line. Local governments claimed that an estimated daily usage of 1,292 could be achieved, but daily usage in 2022 was only 377 with the line incurring a deficit of 470 million yen over the previous three years.

In December 2024, JR West proposed conversion of the Mine Line to Bus Rapid Transit (BRT).

In May 2025, JR West announces that its preferred option for restoration of the Mine Line is conversion to BRT. Mine City still prefers restoration of the line as a railway.

On August 7, 2025, JR West, Yamaguchi Prefecture, Mine City, Sanyo Onoda City, and Nagato City agreed to abandon restoration of the railway line and to convert the Mine Line to BRT.

== Stations ==
All stations are in Yamaguchi Prefecture.

Name		Distance (km)	Connections	Location
Asa	厚狭	0.0	Sanyō Shinkansen, Sanyō Main Line	San'yō-Onoda
Kamonoshō S.B.	鴨ノ庄信号	(2.0)		San'yō-Onoda
Yunotō	湯ノ峠	4.2		San'yō-Onoda
Atsu	厚保	10.2		Mine
Shirōgahara	四郎ヶ原	13.2		Mine
Minami-Ōmine	南大嶺	16.9		Mine
Mine	美祢	19.4		Mine
Shigeyasu	重安	22.3		Mine
Ofuku	於福	27.2		Mine
Shibuki	渋木	37.1		Nagato
Nagato-Yumoto	長門湯本	41.0		Nagato
Itamochi	板持	43.3		Nagato
Nagatoshi	長門市	46.0	San'in Main Line	Nagato

== See also ==
- List of railway lines in Japan
