= Ono, Yamaguchi (Asa District) =

Dissolved municipality in Asa district, Yamaguchi prefecture, Japan

Ono (小野村, Ono-son) was a village located in Asa District, Yamaguchi Prefecture.

On October 1, 1954, the village merged into the city of Ube and dissolved. It is currently part of the northern region in the city of Ube.

== History ==
- April 1889 - Due to the municipal status enforcement, the village was born as part of Asa District, Yamaguchi.
- November 1, 1954 - The village along with the villages of Kotō and Nihose in Asa District, and the village of Higashikiwa in Yoshiki District merged into the city of Ube and dissolved.

== See also ==
- List of dissolved municipalities of Japan
- List of dissolved municipalities of Yamaguchi Prefecture
- 小野村
