= Mitō, Yamaguchi =

Mitō 美東町
- Former municipality
- Location of Mitō in Yamaguchi

- Location in Japan
- Coordinates: 34°13′N 131°20′E
- Country: Japan
- Prefecture: Yamaguchi
- Merged: March 21, 2008 (now part of Mine)

Area
  - Total: 129.49 km^{2} (50.00 sq mi)

Population (October 1, 2004)
  - Total: 6,198
- Time zone: UTC+09:00 (JST)
- Symbols
- Flower: Iris laevigata
- Tree: Chamaecyparis obtusa

Mitō (美東町, Mitō-chō) was a town located in Mine District, Yamaguchi Prefecture, Japan.

As of October 1, 2004, the town had an estimated population of 6,198 and a population density of 47.9 persons per km^{2}. The total area was 129.49 km^{2}.

On March 21, 2008, Mitō, along with the town of Shūhō (also from Mine District), was merged into the expanded city of Mine.
