= Mine Station =

Railway station in Mine, Yamaguchi Prefecture, Japan

Mine Station 美祢駅
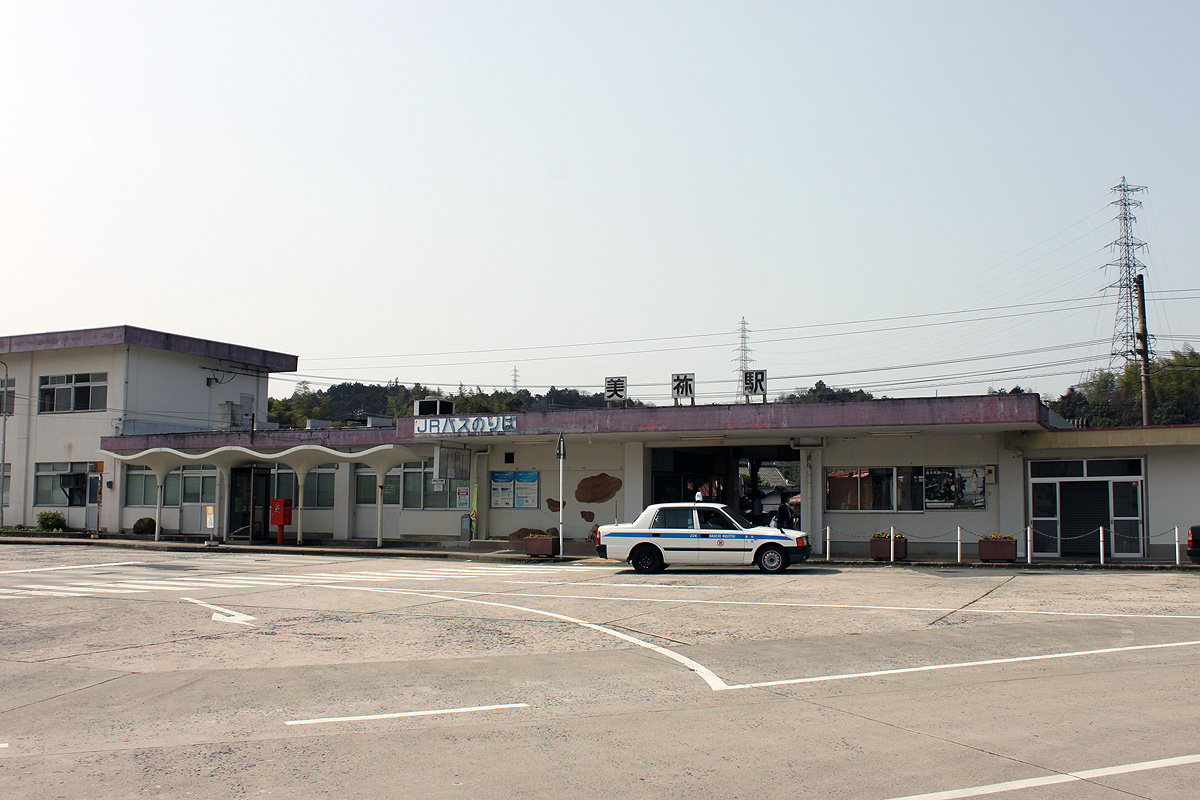
- Mine Station, March 2010

General information
- Location: 3408 Heijo, Higashibun, Omine-cho, Mine-shi, Yamaguchi-ken 759-2212; Japan
- Coordinates: 34°10′9.05″N 131°12′15.69″E
- Owner: West Japan Railway Company
- Operator: West Japan Railway Company
- Line: Mine Line
- Distance: 19.4 km (12.1 miles) from Asa
- Platforms: 1 side platform
- Tracks: 1
- Connections: Bus terminal

Construction
- Structure type: At grade

Other information
- Status: Unstaffed
- Website: Official website

History
- Opened: 15 September 1916
- Former names: Yoshinori (until 1963)

Passengers
- FY2020: 290

Services
| Preceding station | JR West | Following station |
|---|---|---|
| Minami-Ōmine towards Asa | Mine Line | Shigeyasu towards Nagatoshi |
Location
- Location within Yamaguchi Prefecture Location within Japan

Mine Station (美祢駅, Mine-eki) is a passenger railway station located in the city of Mine, Yamaguchi Prefecture, Japan. It is operated by the West Japan Railway Company (JR West).

== Lines ==
Mine Station is served by the JR West Mine Line, and is located 19.4 kilometers from the junction of the San'yō Main Line at Asa.

== Station layout ==
The station consists of one ground-level unnumbered side platform and one island platform, connected by a footbridge; however, the island platform is not in use and all traffic in both directions uses the side platform. The station is unattended.

== Platforms ==
| station side | ■ Mine Line | for Nagatoshi for Asa |

== History ==
Mine Station was opened on 15 September 1916 as the Yoshinori Temporary Stop (吉則停留場, Yoshinori Teiryujo) on the Ōmine Light Railway between Isa Station (present-day Minami-Ōmine Station) and Shigeyasu Station. It was elevated to a full passenger station on 1 June 1920 as Yoshinori Station (吉則駅) when the line was nationalized. The station was renamed on 1 October 1963. With the privatization of the Japan National Railway (JNR) on 1 April 1987, the station came under the aegis of the West Japan railway Company (JR West).

== Passenger statistics ==
In fiscal 2020, the station was used by an average of 290 passengers daily.

== Surrounding area ==
Mine Station is located at the northwest end of the center of Mine City. Japan National Route 435 runs to the south of the station, Japan National Route 316 runs to the east, and the Asa River runs further south of National Route 435.

- Mine City Hall

== See also ==
- List of railway stations in Japan
