= Japan National Route 316 =

Road in Yamaguchi prefecture, Japan

National Route 316
- 国道316号
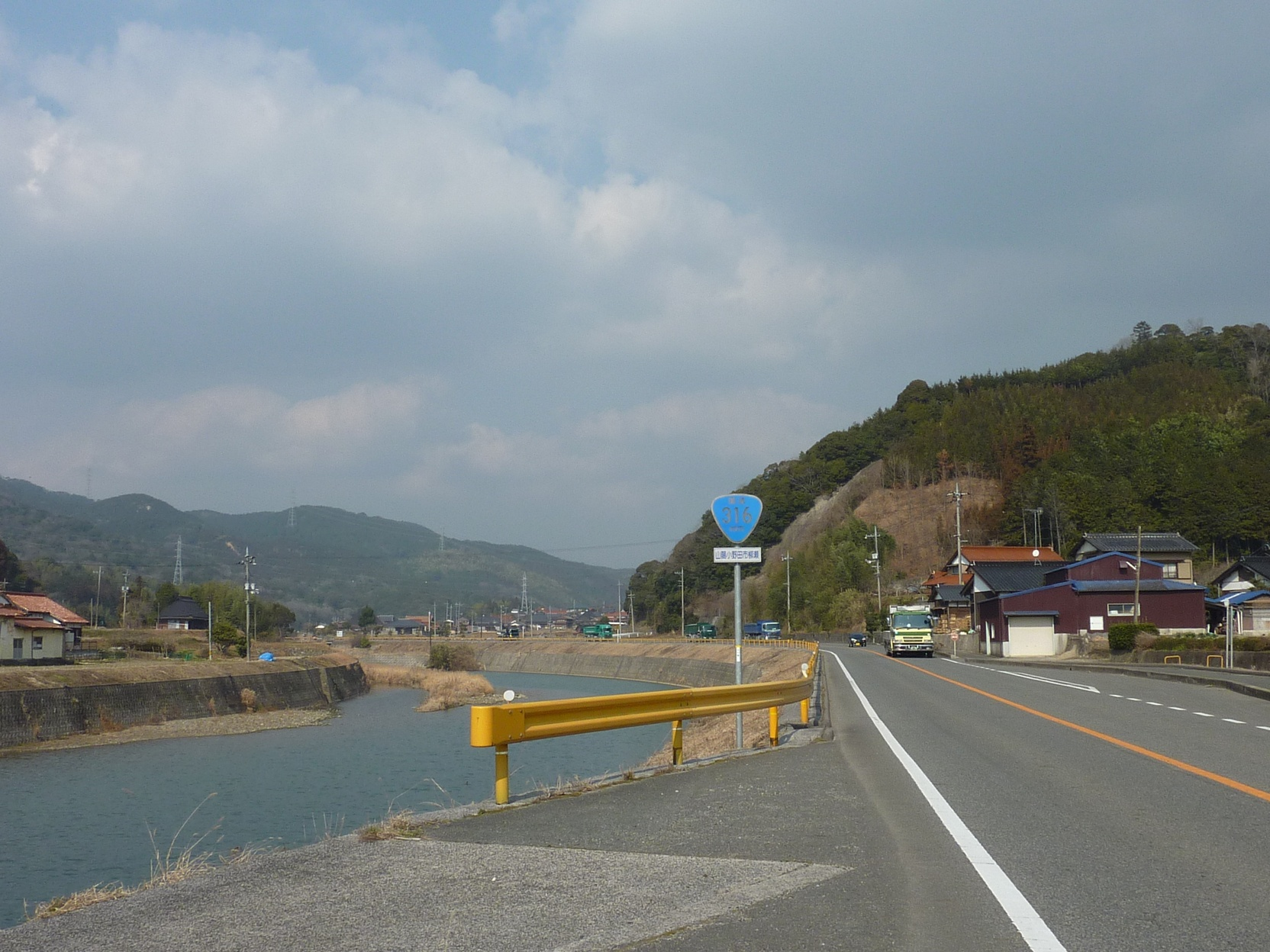

Route information
- Length: 40.2 km (25.0 mi)

Location
- Country: Japan

Highway system
- National highways of Japan; Expressways of Japan
| ← National Route 315 | → National Route 317 |

National Route 316 is a national highway of Japan connecting the towns of Nagato and San'yō-Onoda in Yamaguchi prefecture, with a total length of 40.2 km (24.98 mi).
