= Nagatoshi Station =

Railway station in Nagato, Yamaguchi Prefecture, Japan

Nagatoshi Station 長門市駅
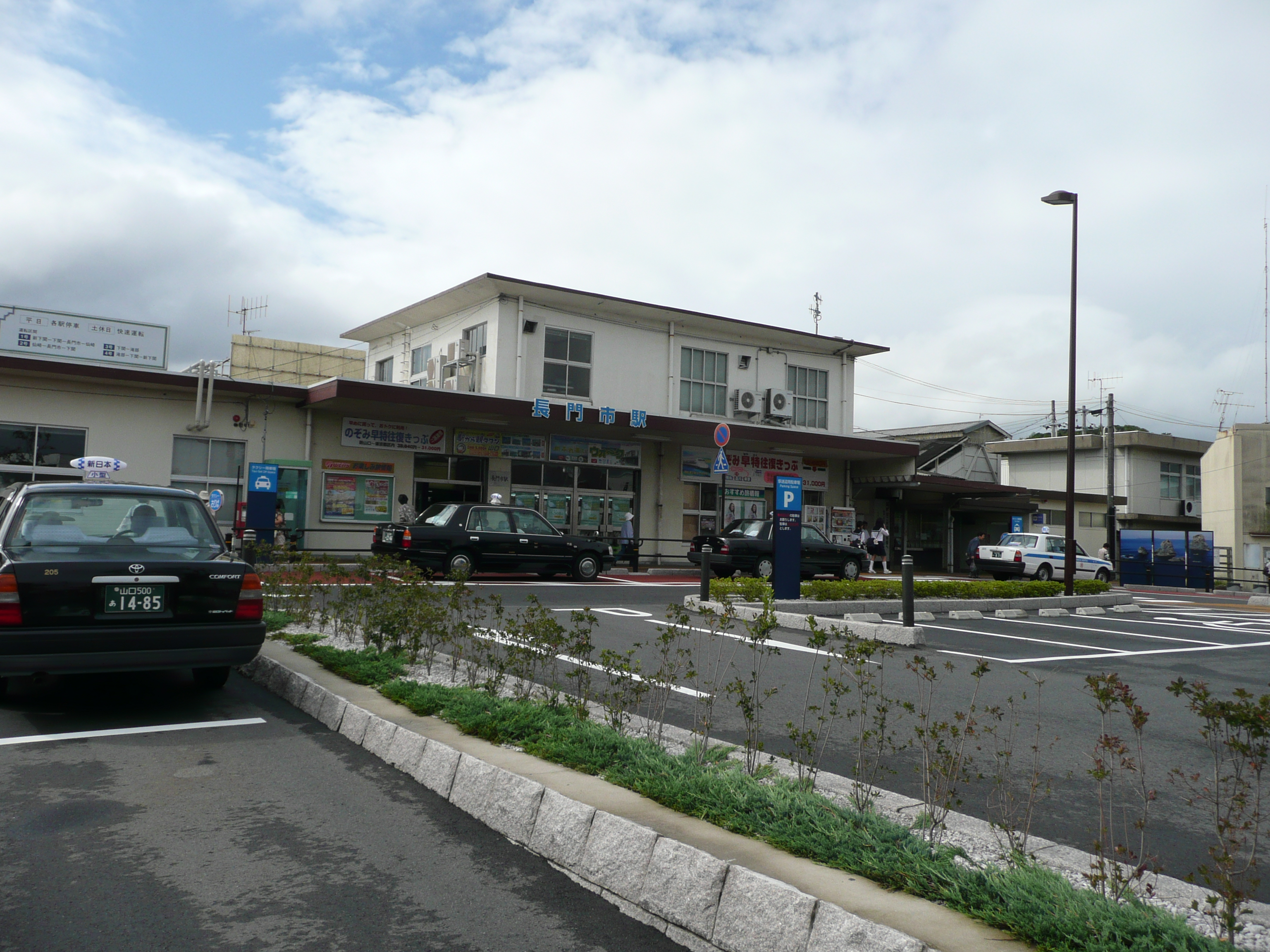
- Nagatoshi Station in July 2009

General information
- Location: 903-5 Higashifukawa, Nagato-shi, Yamaguchi-ken 759-4101; Japan
- Coordinates: 34°22′30.9″N 131°11′6.1″E
- Owner: West Japan Railway Company
- Operator: West Japan Railway Company
- Lines: San'in Main Line; Mine Line
- Distance: 599.6 km (372.6 miles) from Kyoto
- Platforms: 1 side + 1 island platform
- Tracks: 4
- Connections: Bus stop

Construction
- Structure type: At grade

Other information
- Status: Staffed
- Website: Official website

History
- Opened: 23 March 1924; 102 years ago
- Former names: Shōmyōichi Station (to 1962)

Passengers
- FY2020: 348

Services
Preceding station	JR West	Following station
Itamochi towards Asa	Mine Line	Terminus
Kiwado towards Shimonoseki	San'in Main Line	Nagato-Misumi towards Masuda
Location
- Location within Yamaguchi Prefecture Location within Japan

Nagatoshi Station (長門市駅, Nagatoshi-eki) is a passenger railway station located in the city of Nagato, Yamaguchi Prefecture, Japan. It is operated by the West Japan Railway Company (JR West).

== Lines ==
Nagatoshi Station is served by the JR West San'in Main Line, and is located 599.6 kilometers from the terminus of the line at Kyoto. It is also the terminus of the San'in Main Line Branch Line, a 2.6 kilometer spur line to Senzaki. The station is also the northern terminus of the Mine Line, and is 46.0 kilometers from the opposing terminus of that line at Asa.

== Station layout ==
The station consists of one side platform and one island platform, connected to the station building by a footbridge. However, the side platform has a dead-headed cutout, allowing the platform to be used by two tracks. The station is staffed. The turntable located next to the station was sold to the private railway operator Tobu Railway in 2016 and installed next to Shimo-Imaichi Station in Tochigi Prefecture for use by steam-hauled tourist trains.

== Platforms ==
0	■ San'in Main Line	<siding>
1	■ San'in Main Line	for Kogushi and Shimonoseki; Higashi-Hagi and Masuda
2	■ Mine Line	for Mine and Asa
2	■ San'in Main Line	for Senzaki
3	■ San'in Main Line	for Kogushi and Shimonoseki; Higashi-Hagi and Masuda for Senzaki
3	■ Mine Line	for Mine and Asa

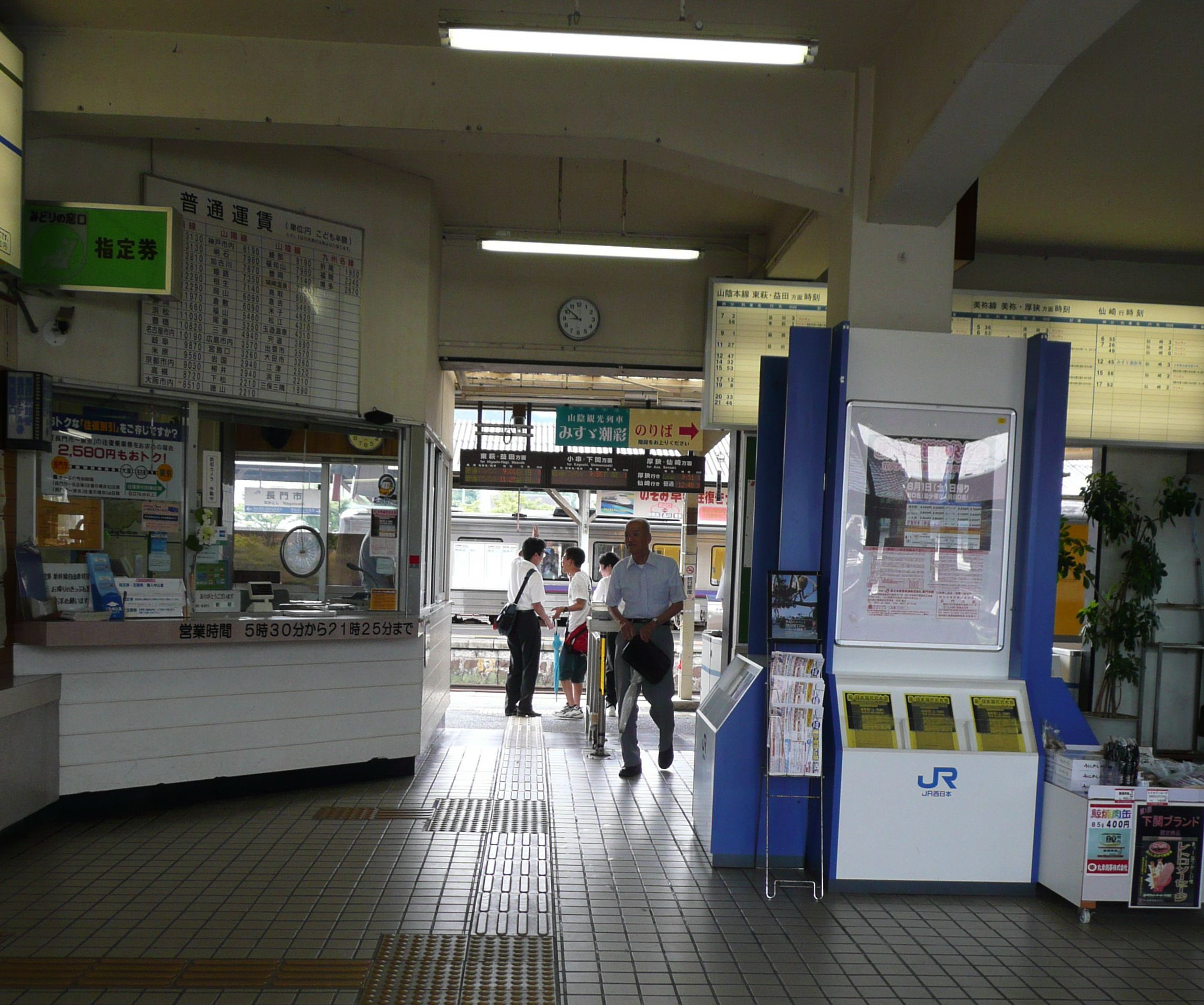
Ticket office, July 2009

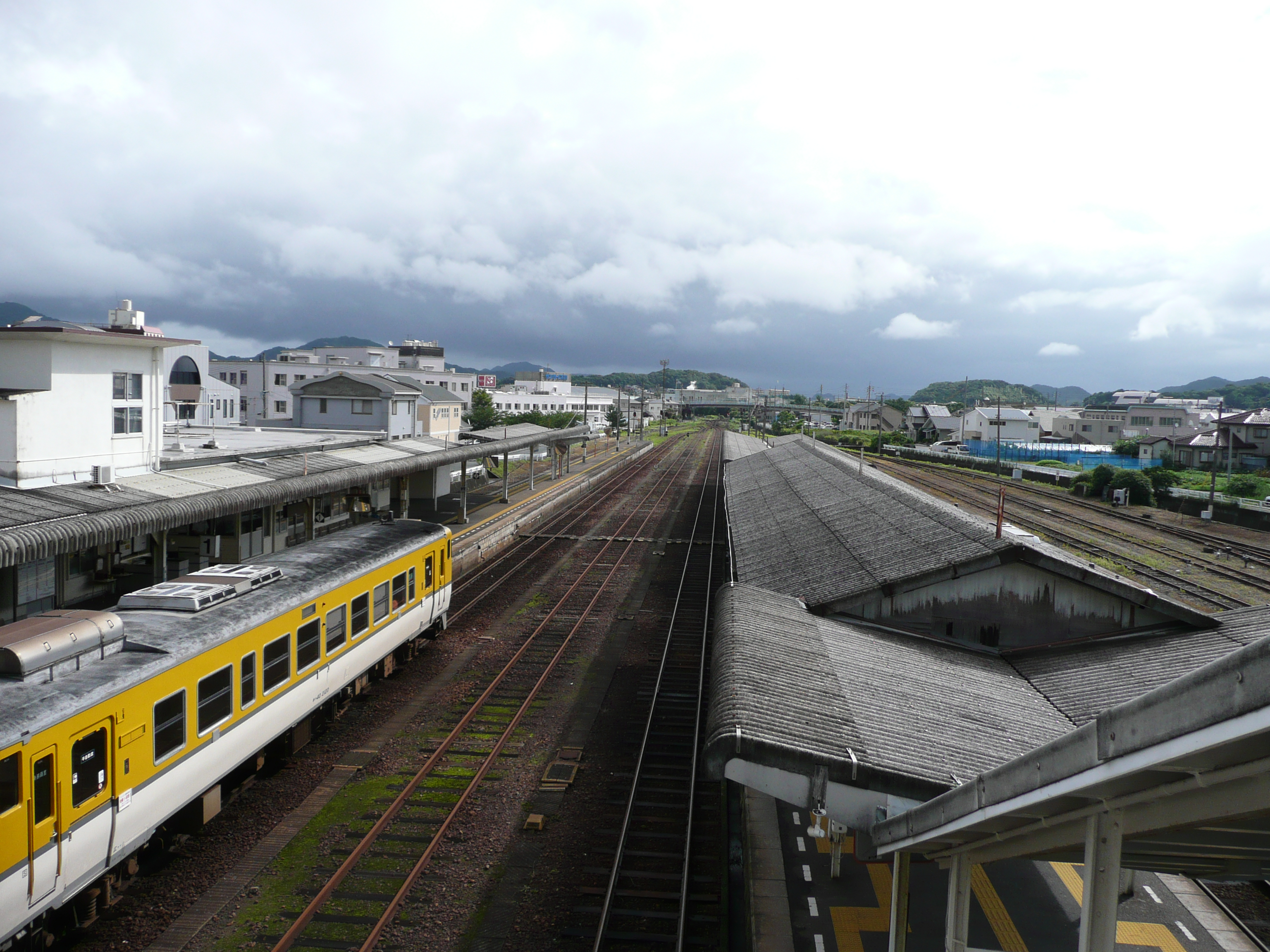
Platforms, July 2009

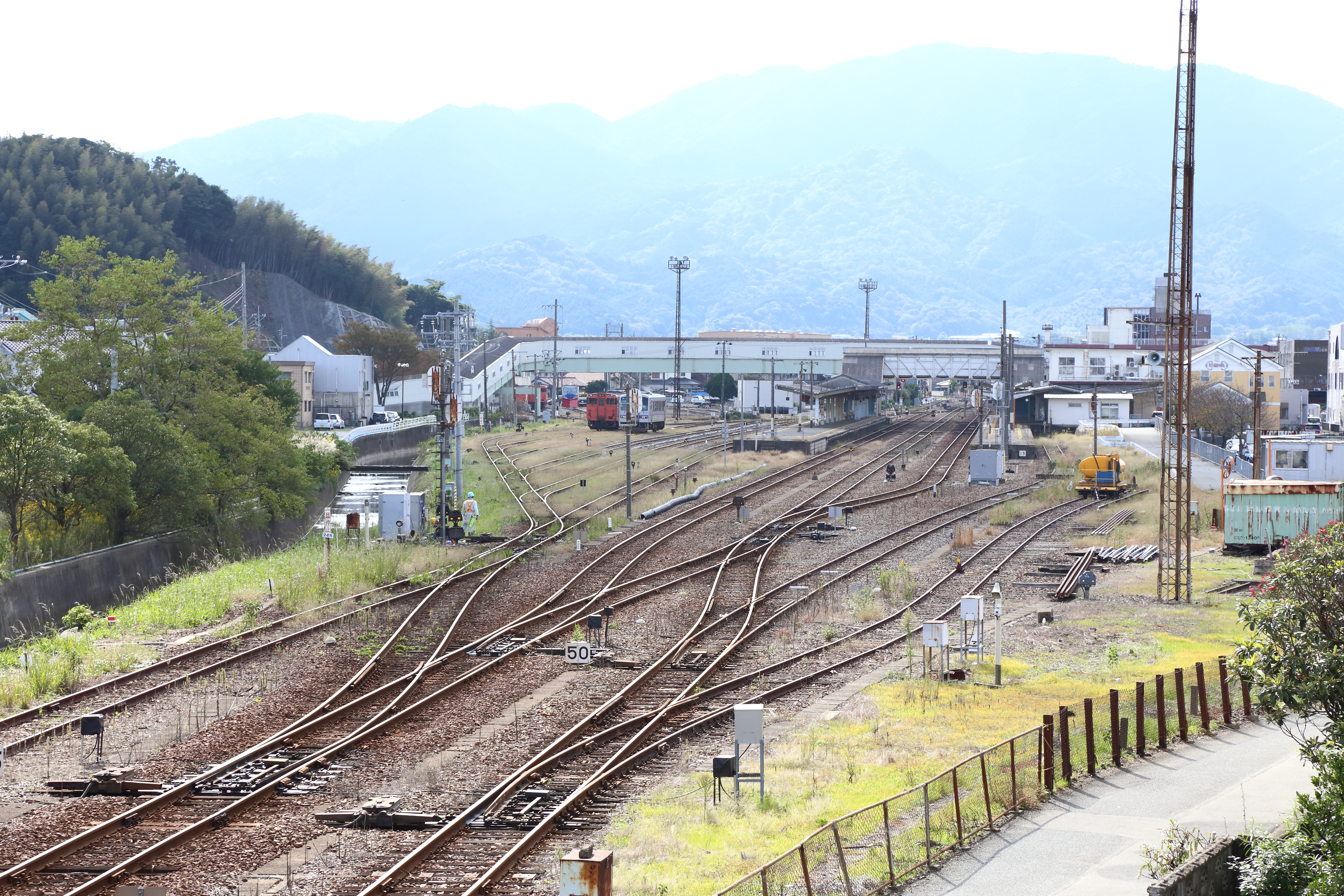
Platforms and station, October 2016

== History ==
Nagatoshi Station was opened on 23 March 1924 as Shōmyōichi Station (正明市駅) when the Japan Government Railways Mine Line was extended from Ofuku Station (now Nagatoshi Station). The line was further extended to Nagato-Misumi Station on 3 November of the same year. The spur line to Senzaki Station opened on15 March 1930. This portion of the Mine Line past this statuion was incorporated into the San'in Main Line on 24 February 1933. The station was renamed to its present name on 1 November 1962. Freight operations were discontinued on 1 January 1984. With the privatization of the Japan National Railway (JNR) on 1 April 1987, the station came under the aegis of the West Japan Railway Company (JR West).

== Passenger statistics ==
In fiscal 2020, the station was used by an average of 348 passengers daily.

== Surrounding area ==
- Nagato City Hall
- Japan National Route 191

== See also ==
- List of railway stations in Japan
