= Asa Station =

Railway station in San'yō-Onoda, Yamaguchi Prefecture, Japan

Asa Station 厚狭駅
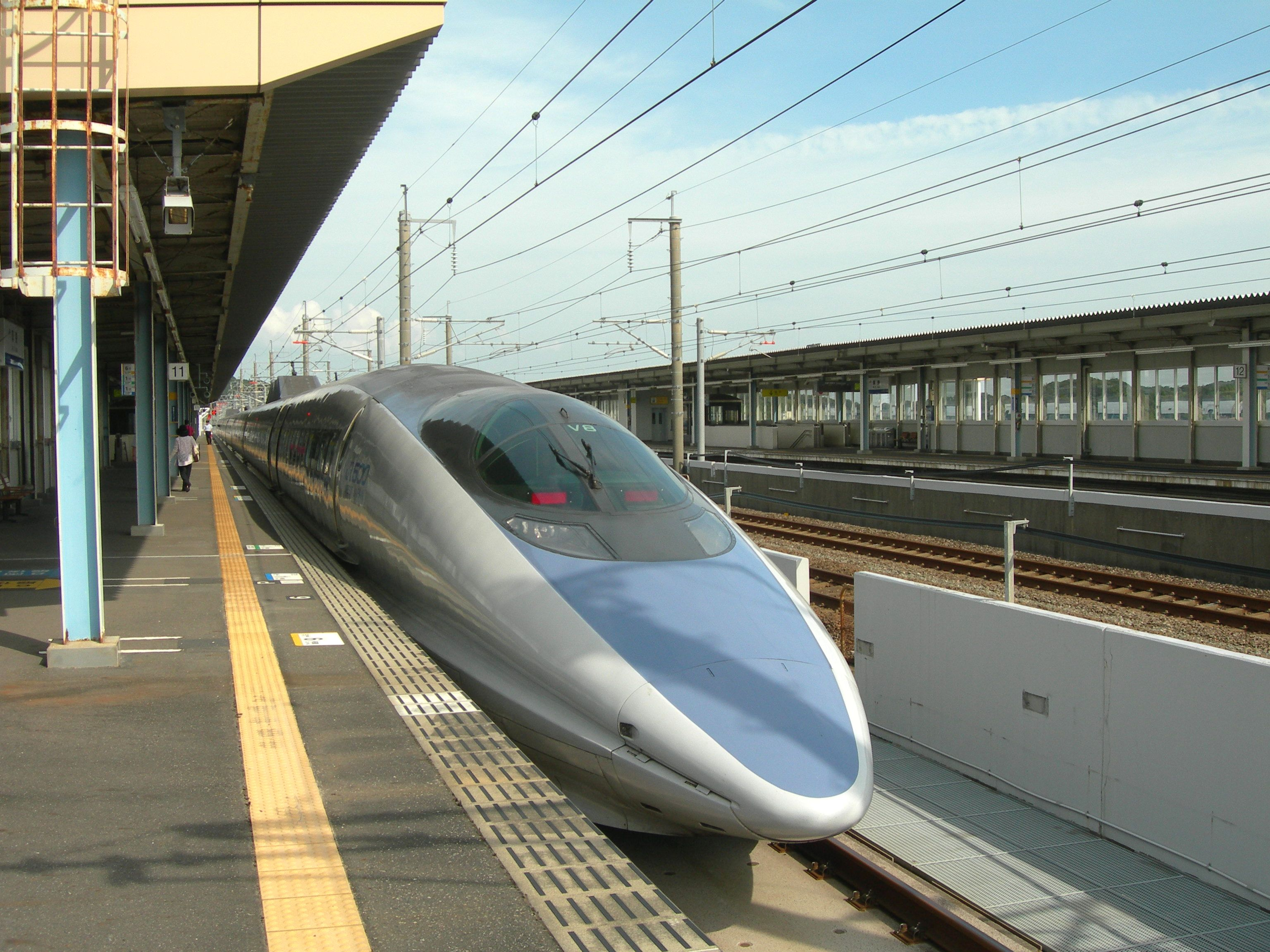
- A 500 Series Kodama train at Asa Station.

General information
- Location: 8–3 Okita, Asa, San'yō-Onoda-shi, Yamaguchi-ken 757-0001; Japan
- Coordinates: 34°3′11.8″N 131°9′35.3″E
- Owner: West Japan Railway Company
- Operator: West Japan Railway Company Japan Freight Railway Company
- Lines: San'yō Shinkansen; San'yō Line; Mine Line
- Distance: 1,062.1 km (660.0 miles) from Tokyo
- Platforms: 2 side platforms (Shinkansen); 2 island platforms and 1 side platform (conventional line)
- Tracks: 4 (2 non-stopping) (Shinkansen); 5 (conventional line)
- Connections: Bus stop

Construction
- Structure type: Elevated (Shinkansen); At grade (conventional line)

Other information
- Status: Staffed
- Website: Official website

History
- Opened: 3 December 1900

Passengers
- FY2022: 1321

Services
Preceding station	JR West	Following station
Shin-Shimonoseki towards Hakata or Hakataminami	San'yō Shinkansen Kodama	Shin-Yamaguchi towards Shin-Ōsaka
Terminus	Mine Line	Yunotō towards Nagatoshi
Habu towards Shimonoseki	San'yō Line	Onoda towards Iwakuni
Location
- Location within Yamaguchi Prefecture Location within Japan

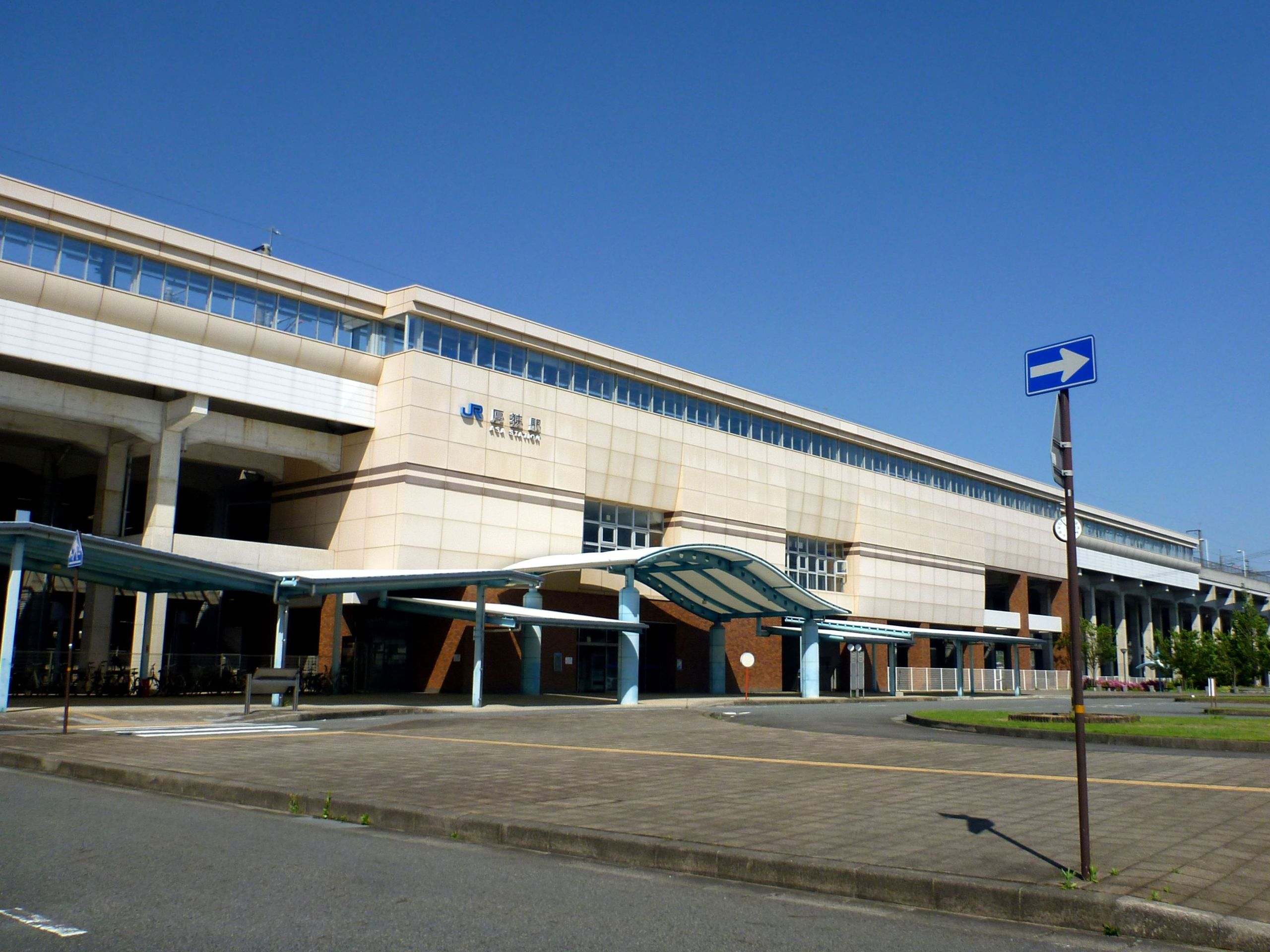
Asa Station

Asa Station (厚狭駅, Asa-eki) is a passenger railway station located in the city of San'yō-Onoda, Yamaguchi Prefecture, Japan. It is operated by the West Japan Railway Company (JR West). It is also the location of a freight depot operated by the Japan Freight Railway Company (JR Freight).

== Lines ==
Asa Station is served by the JR West San'yō Shinkansen, and is located 509.5 kilometers from Shin-Osaka and 1062.1 kilometers from Tokyo. It is also served by San'yō Main Line, on which it is 494.3 kilometers from the terminus of the line at Kobe. Asa Station is also the southern terminus of the 46.0 kilometer Mine Line to Nagatoshi.

== Station layout ==
The station consists of two opposed side platforms sandwiching two island platforms connected by a footbridge for normal operations. Originally, it had four platforms and seven tracks, but platform 5 (opposite side of platform 6, Sanyo inbound siding) and platform 8 (opposite side of platform 7, Sanyo outbound siding) are no longer in use. Platform 4 is a central line with no physical platform and is sometimes used by freight trains. In the past, Platform 0 was installed in the cutout on the east side of Platform 1 and was used for the Mine Line, but now the tracks have been removed and a fence has been installed, making it inaccessible. Additionally, there are two opposed elevated side platforms for Shinkansen operations. The station is staffed.

== Platforms ==
1	■ Mine Line	for Mine and Nagatoshi
1	■ San'yō Line	for Shimonoseki and Kokura
2	■ San'yō Line	for Ube, Shin-Yamaguchi and Tokuyama
2	■ San'yō Line	for Shimonoseki and Kokura
2	■ Mine Line	for Mine and Nagatoshi
6	■ San'yō Line	for Ube, Shin-Yamaguchi and Tokuyama
7	■ San'yō Line	for Shimonoseki and Kokura
11	■ Sanyo Shinkansen	forHiroshima, Okayama and Shin-Ōsaka
12	■ Sanyo Shinkansen	for Kokura and Hakata

== History ==
Asa Station was opened on 3 December 1900 on the San'yō Railway when the line was extended from Mitajiri Station (present-day Hōfu Station). The San'yō Railway was railway nationalized in 1906 and the line renamed the San'yō Main Line in 1909. With the privatization of the Japan National Railway (JNR) on 1 April 1987, the station came under the aegis of the West Japan Railway Company (JR West). The Sanyo Shinkansen station opened on 13 March 1999, making it the newest station on the Sanyo Shinkansen line.

Although nominally a freight deport for the Japan Freight Railway Company, freight has not been handled since 1984, but until 2013 there was a freight train that ran directly between the Mine Line and the Sanyo Main Line in the direction of Ube, so work such as replacing the locomotive was being carried out.

== Passenger statistics ==
In fiscal 2022, the station was used by an average of 1321 passengers daily.

== Surrounding area ==
- Sanyo Onoda City Sanyo General Office (former Sanyo Town Hall)
- Sanyo Onoda Municipal Asa Elementary School
- Sanyo Onoda Municipal Asa Junior High School
- Yamaguchi Prefectural Asa High School

== See also ==
- List of railway stations in Japan
