= 227 series =

Japanese electric multiple unit train type

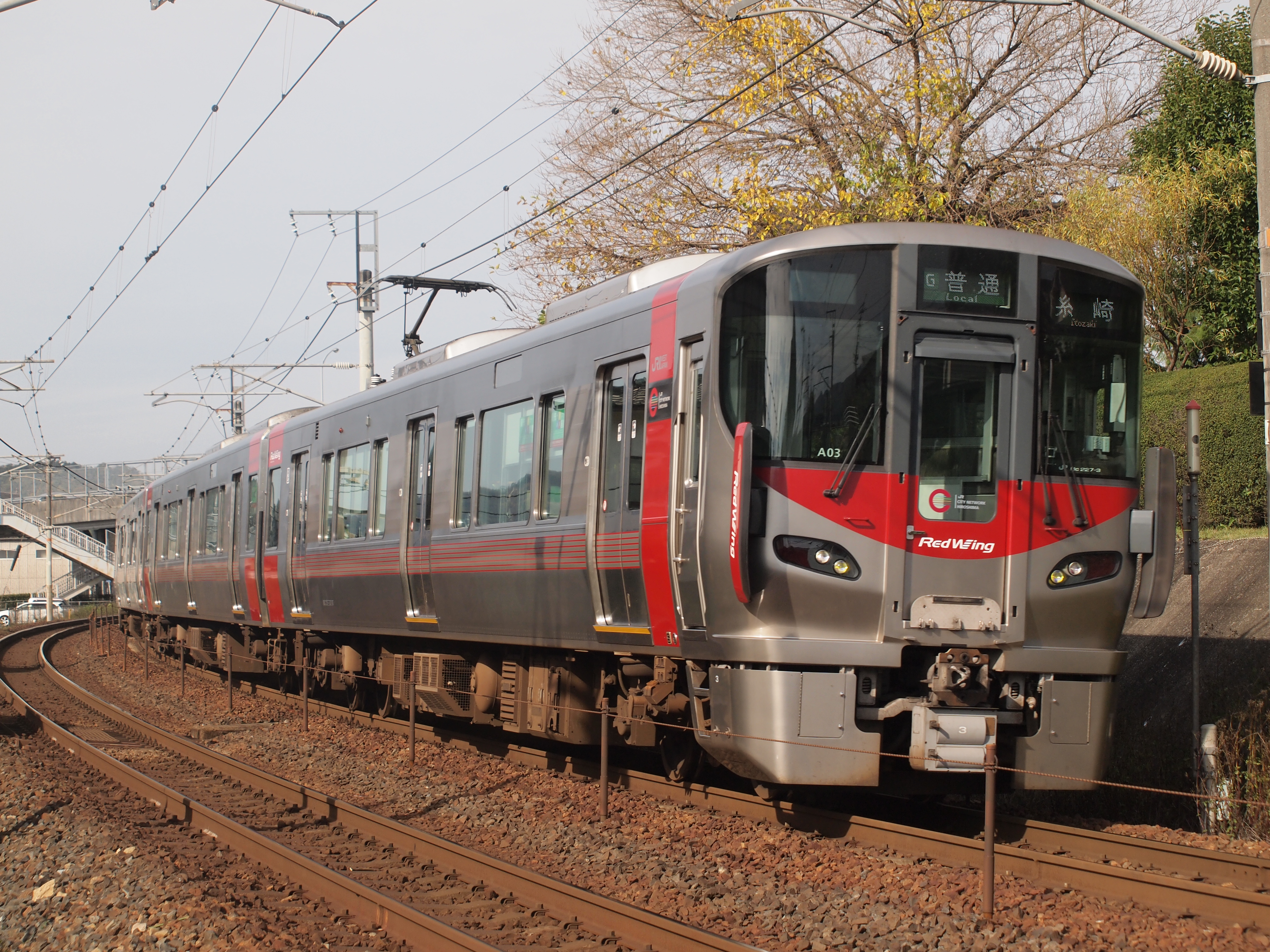
- 227-0 series 3-car set A03 in November 2015
- Manufacturers: Kawasaki Heavy Industries, Kinki Sharyo
- Built at: Hyogo and Osaka
- Replaced: 103 series, 105 series, 115 series, 117 series
- Constructed: 2014–present
- Entered service: 14 March 2015
- Formation: 2/3 cars per trainset
- Operator: JR West
- Depots: Hiroshima, Hineno
- Lines served: Sanyo Main Line, Kabe Line, Kure Line (227-0 series); Kisei Main Line, Sakurai Line, Wakayama Line (227-1000 series); Sanyo Main Line, Hakubi Line, Uno Line, Honshi–Bisan Line, Akō Line (227-500 series)

Specifications
- Car body construction: Stainless steel
- Car length: 19,570 mm (64 ft 2 in) (end cars); 19,500 mm (64 ft 0 in) (intermediate cars)
- Width: 2,950 mm (9 ft 8 in)
- Height: 3,630 mm (11 ft 11 in)
- Floor height: 1,120 mm (3 ft 8 in)
- Doors: 3 pairs per side
- Maximum speed: 110 km/h (68 mph) (Service); 120 km/h (75 mph) (Design)
- Traction system: Variable frequency: IGBT (227-0 series); SiC-MOSFET (227-1000 series)
- Power output: 270 kW (360 hp) × 2 per motored car
- Acceleration: 2.5 km/(h⋅s) (1.6 mph/s)
- Deceleration: 3.9 km/(h⋅s) (2.4 mph/s)
- Electric systems: 1,500 V DC (overhead catenary)
- Current collection: Pantograph
- Safety systems: ATS-SW2; D-TAS (227-0 series); ATS-P3, CBTC and Dead man's switch (227-1000 series)
- Track gauge: 1,067 mm (3 ft 6 in)

The 227 series (227系, 227-kei) is a DC electric multiple unit (EMU) train operated by West Japan Railway Company (JR-West) for use on suburban services in the Kansai and Chūgoku regions of Japan since 14 March 2015.

On 14 March 2015, the 227-0 series trains, branded "Red Wing", commenced operation in the Hiroshima area. They are the first new train to be introduced to the Hiroshima area in 32 years.

From 16 March 2019, the 227-1000 series began operating in the Kansai region on the Wakayama Line, Sakurai Line, and Kisei Main Line (Kinokuni Line), marking their introduction outside the Hiroshima area.

Starting on 22 July 2023, 227-500 series trains, branded "Urara", were introduced in the greater Okayama and Fukuyama (Okayama/Bingo) areas.

On 27 June 2026, 227-500 series trains under the brand "Kizashi" began operations in the Yamaguchi area.

== Design ==
Trains have unpainted stainless steel bodies. Each motored car has one motored bogie. The first batch of trains, branded "Red Wing", have logos applied on the sides of the body and on the prominent anti-fall plates on the front ends, which inspired the name.

Passenger saloons use LED lighting, and the trains are equipped with universal access toilets and wheelchair spaces. They are also equipped with LED passenger information displays.

The 227 series design is based on the earlier 225 series, also with lightweight stainless steel bodies.

== Variants ==
- 227-0 series: 2- and 3-car sets for use on the Sanyō Main Line, Kabe Line, and Kure Line services, branded Red Wing
- 227-1000 series: 2-car sets for use on Wakayama Line services
- 227-500 series: 2- and 3-car sets for use on the Sanyō Main Line, Hakubi Line, Uno Line, Honshi–Bisan Line, and Akō Line services, branded Urara and Kizashi

== 227-0 series ==
227-0 series Red Wing
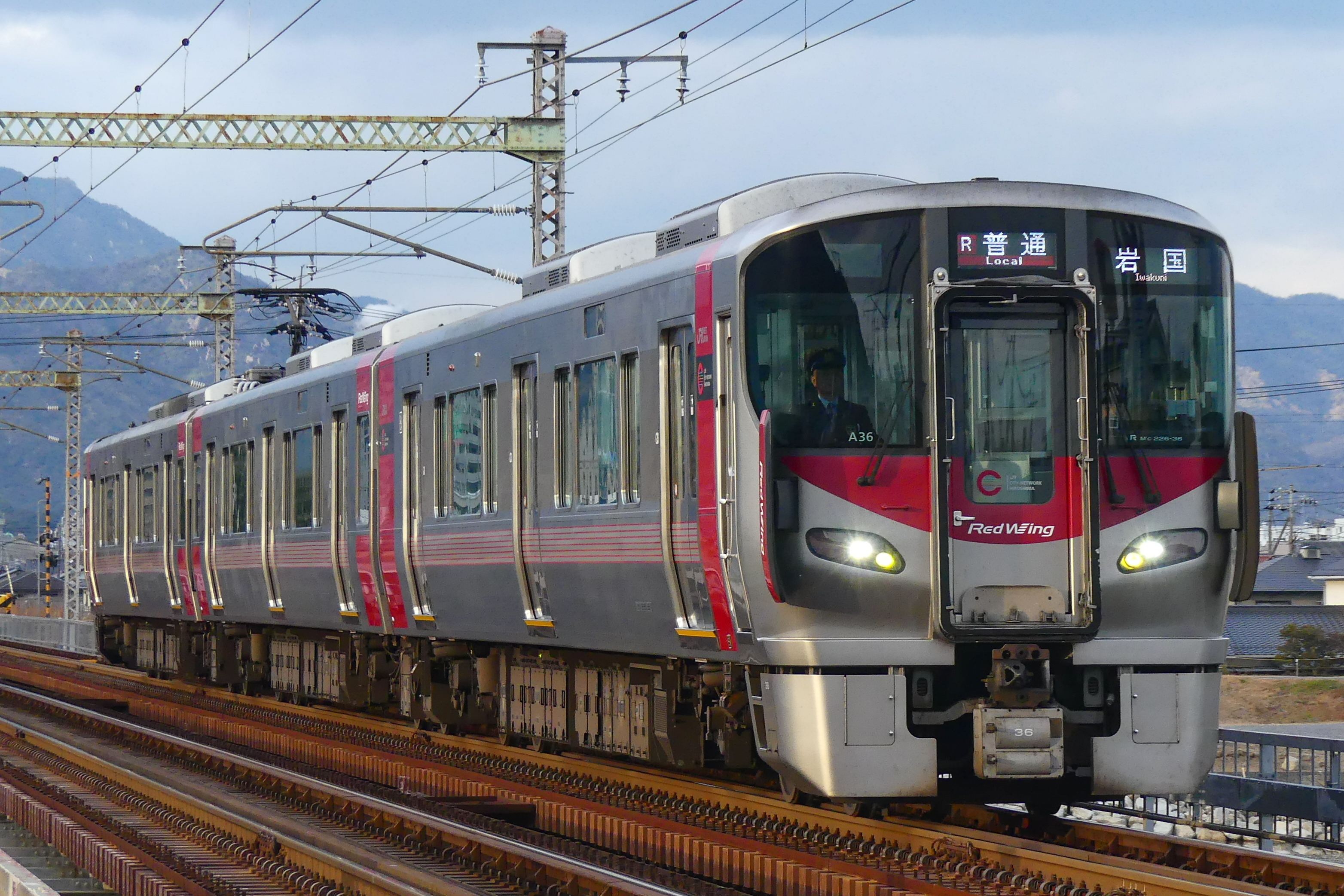
- A 227-0 series 3-car set in January 2018
- In service: 14 March 2015 – present
- Manufacturers: Kawasaki Heavy Industries; Kinki Sharyo
- Replaced: 115 series
- Constructed: 2014–2019
- Number built: 276 vehicles; 42 × 2-car; 64 × 3-car
- Formation: 2/3 cars per trainset
- Fleet numbers: A01–A65 (3-car sets); S01–S42 (2-car sets)
- Capacity: 259 (108 seated) per 2-car set; 408 (180 seated) per 3-car set
- Depot: Hiroshima
- Lines served: G R Sanyo Main Line; B Kabe Line; Y Kure Line

The 227-0 series fleet consists of 276 vehicles (42 two-car sets and 64 three-car sets), which were delivered from autumn 2014 for test running and driver training before entering revenue service initially on the Sanyo Main Line between Shiraichi and Iwakuni, replacing ageing JNR-era 115 series EMUs. The trains were also intended to displace 115 series EMUs on the Kure Line and Kabe Line. The entire fleet was delivered by February 2019.

On 6 March 2015, JR West announced that the 227 series trains will have the official nickname "Red Wing".

The fleet entered revenue service from 14 March 2015. They were the first new trains to operate in the Hiroshima area since the 113-3000 series, which was introduced near the end of JNR; trains introduced since the 113-3000 series were inherited from the Kansai area. The last sets of this sub-series delivered were 2-car sets S41 and S42 in February 2019.

In January 2022, it was announced that the 227-0 series would undergo a trial for platform-side cameras. The cameras would be activated on the right side of the train relative to the direction of driving.

Set A65 was formed in 2022 by combining two cars (KuMoHa 226-11 and MoHa 226-11) from three-car set A11 and one car (KuMoHa 227-33) from three-car set A33.

=== Formations ===
The 227 series fleet consists of 42 two-car and 64 three-car sets, allowing formations of up to eight cars to be formed in service.

==== 3-car sets ====
The three-car sets are numbered A01 onward, and are formed as shown below with all three cars motored (one motored bogie per car).

Designation	Mc	M	M'c
Numbering	KuMoHa 227-0	MoHa 226-0	KuMoHa 226-0
Weight (t)	40.2	37.1	40.5–40.6 (Note: 40.6 t for cars with lubricating device, 40.5 t for cars without)
Capacity (total/seated)	133/56	149/72	126/52

- The seating capacity figures above include 12 flip-down seats in the end cars and 16 in the intermediate cars.
- The KuMoHa 227 car is fitted with a WPS28E single-arm pantograph.
- The KuMoHa 226 car has a universal access toilet.
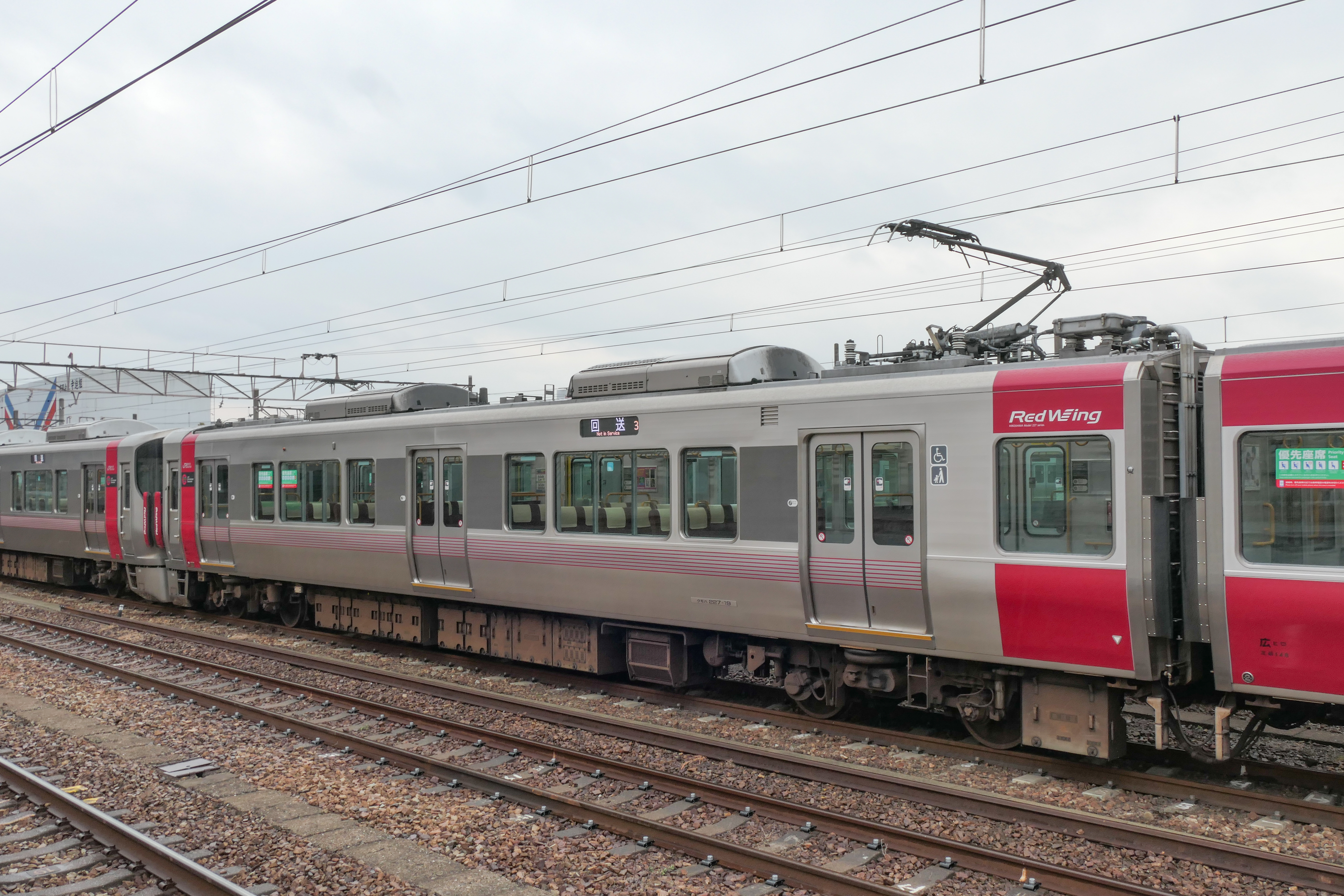
KuMoHa 227-19

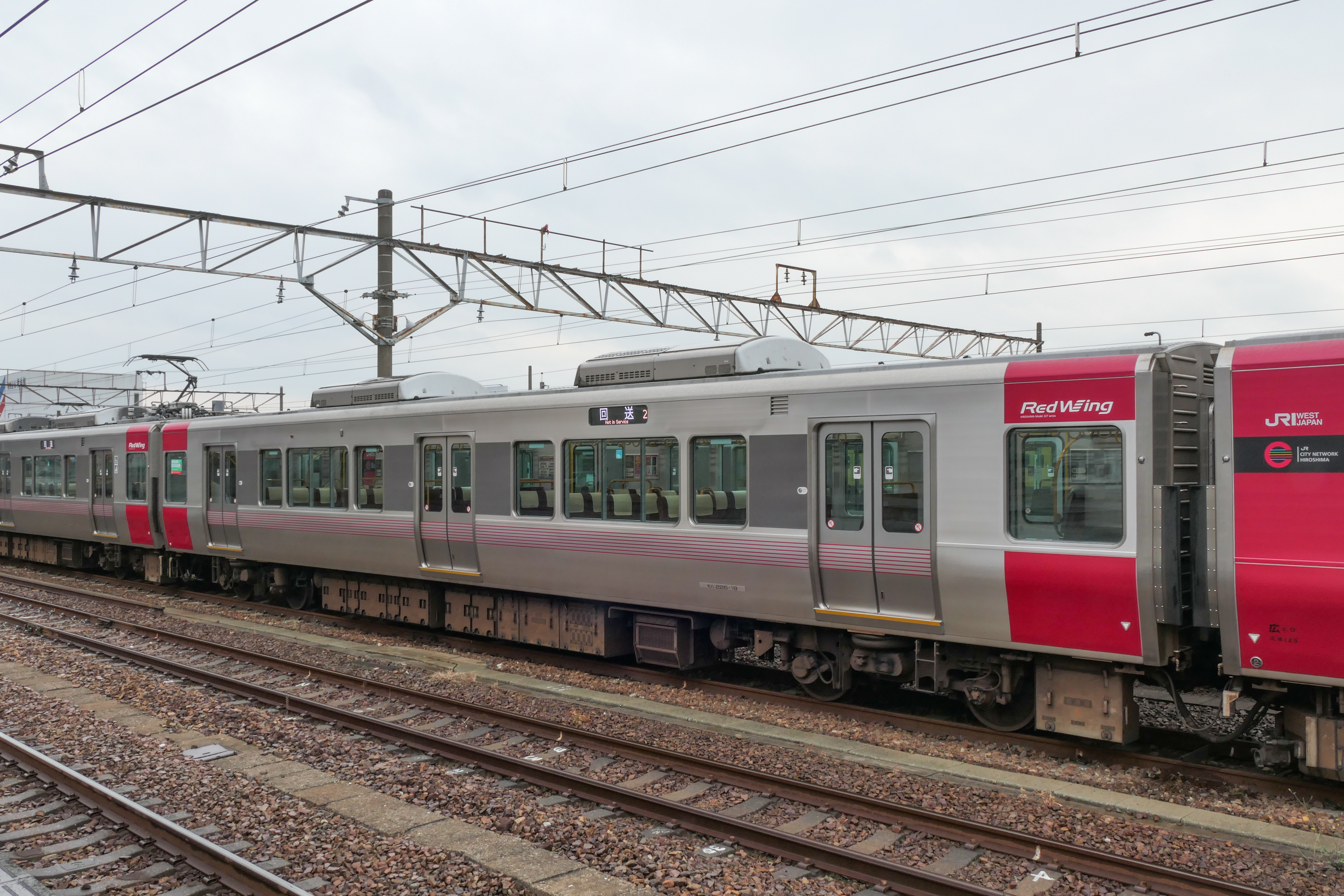
MoHa 226-19

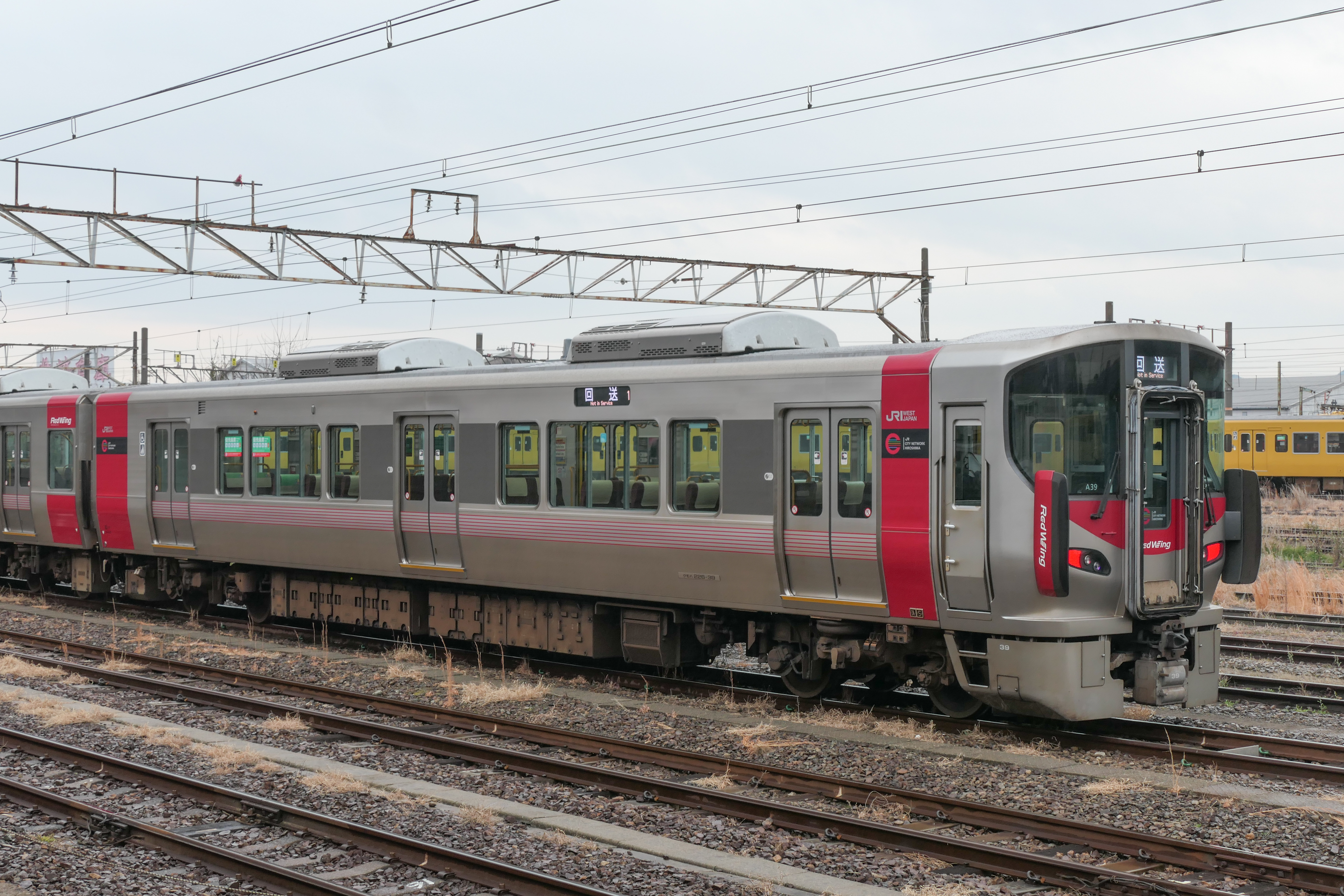
KuMoHa 226-39

==== 2-car sets ====
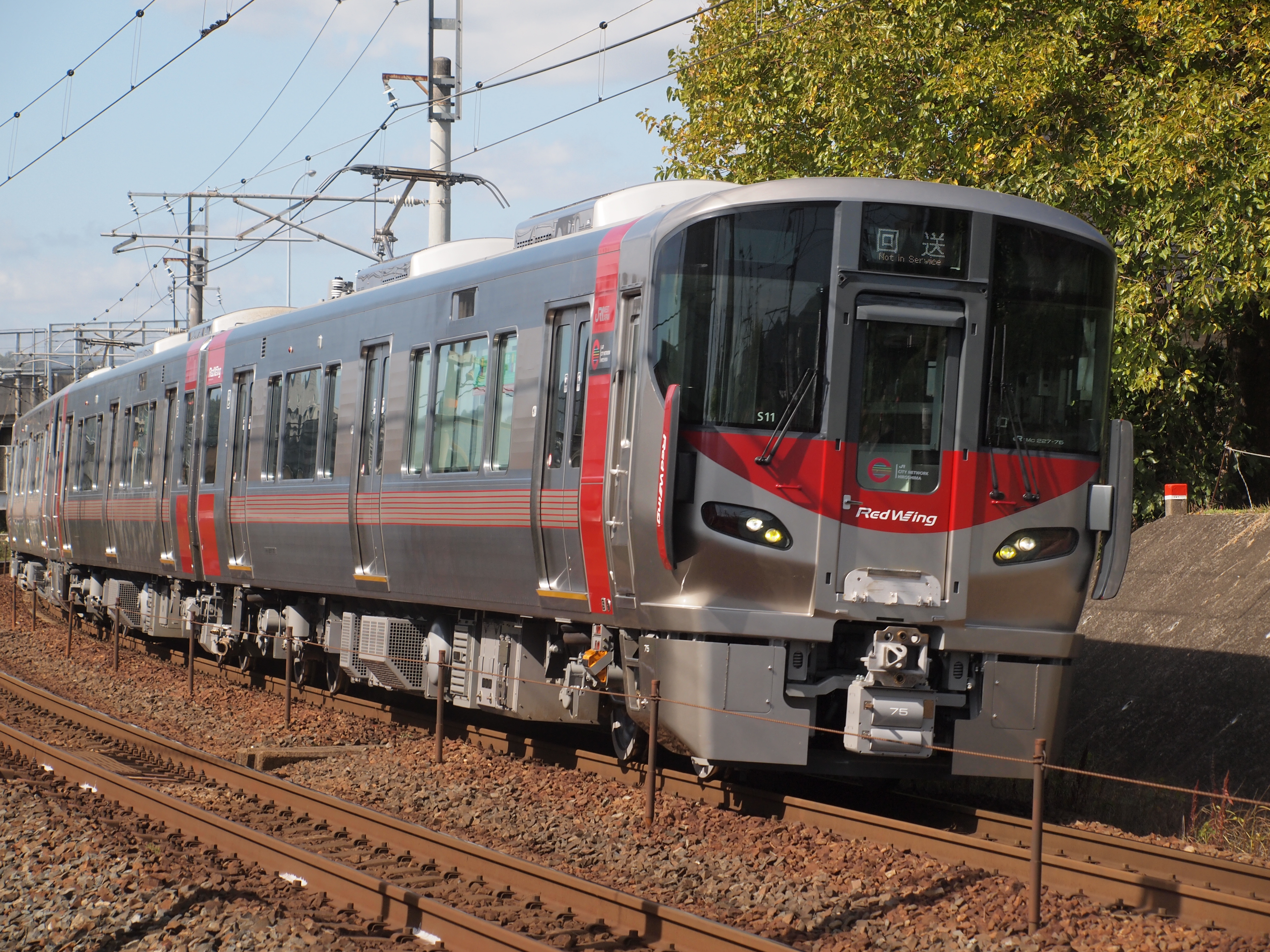
Two-car set S11 in October 2015

The two-car sets are numbered S01 onward, and are formed as shown below with both cars motored (one motored bogie per car).

Designation	Mc	M'c
Numbering	KuMoHa 227-0	KuMoHa 226-0
Weight (t)	40.2	40.5–40.6
Capacity (total/seated)	133/56	126/52

- The seating capacity figures above include 12 flip-down seats in each car.
- The KuMoHa 227 car is fitted with a WPS28E single-arm pantograph.
- The KuMoHa 226 car has a universal access toilet.

=== Interior ===
Passenger accommodation consists of transverse seating with flip-over seat backs, and longitudinal bench seating at the ends of cars. Flip-down seats are also provided next to the doorways.

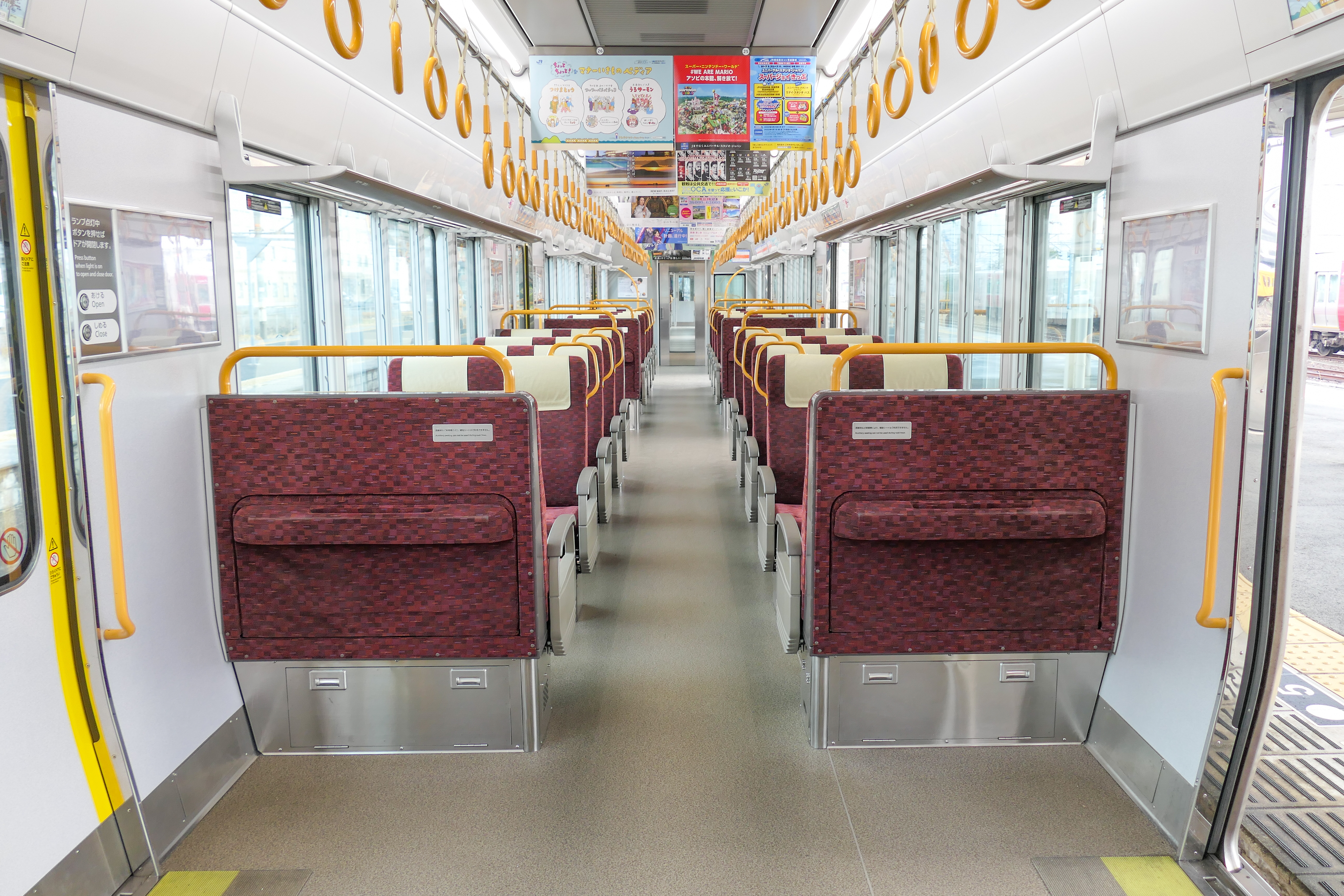
Transverse seating

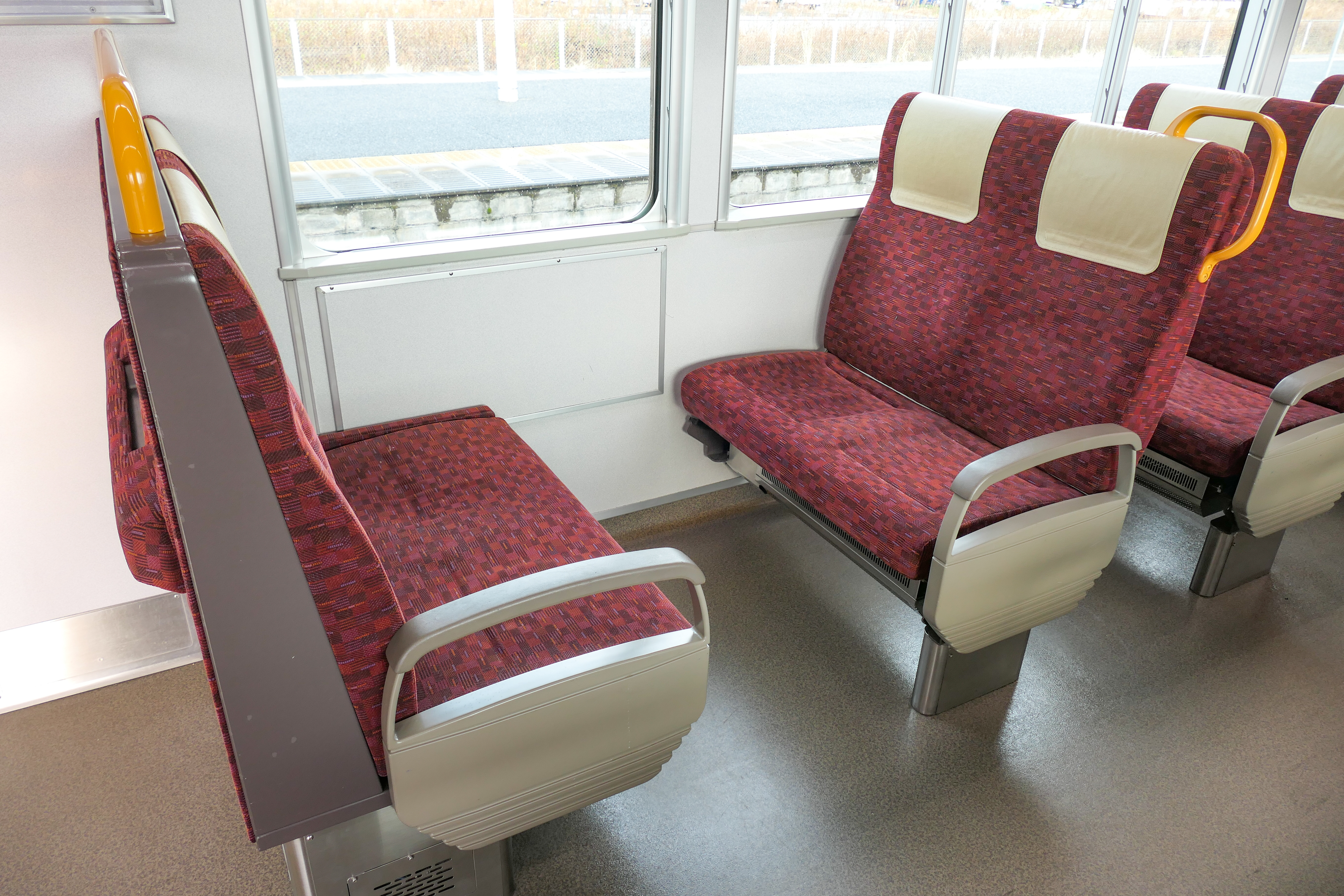
Close-up view of transverse flip-over seating

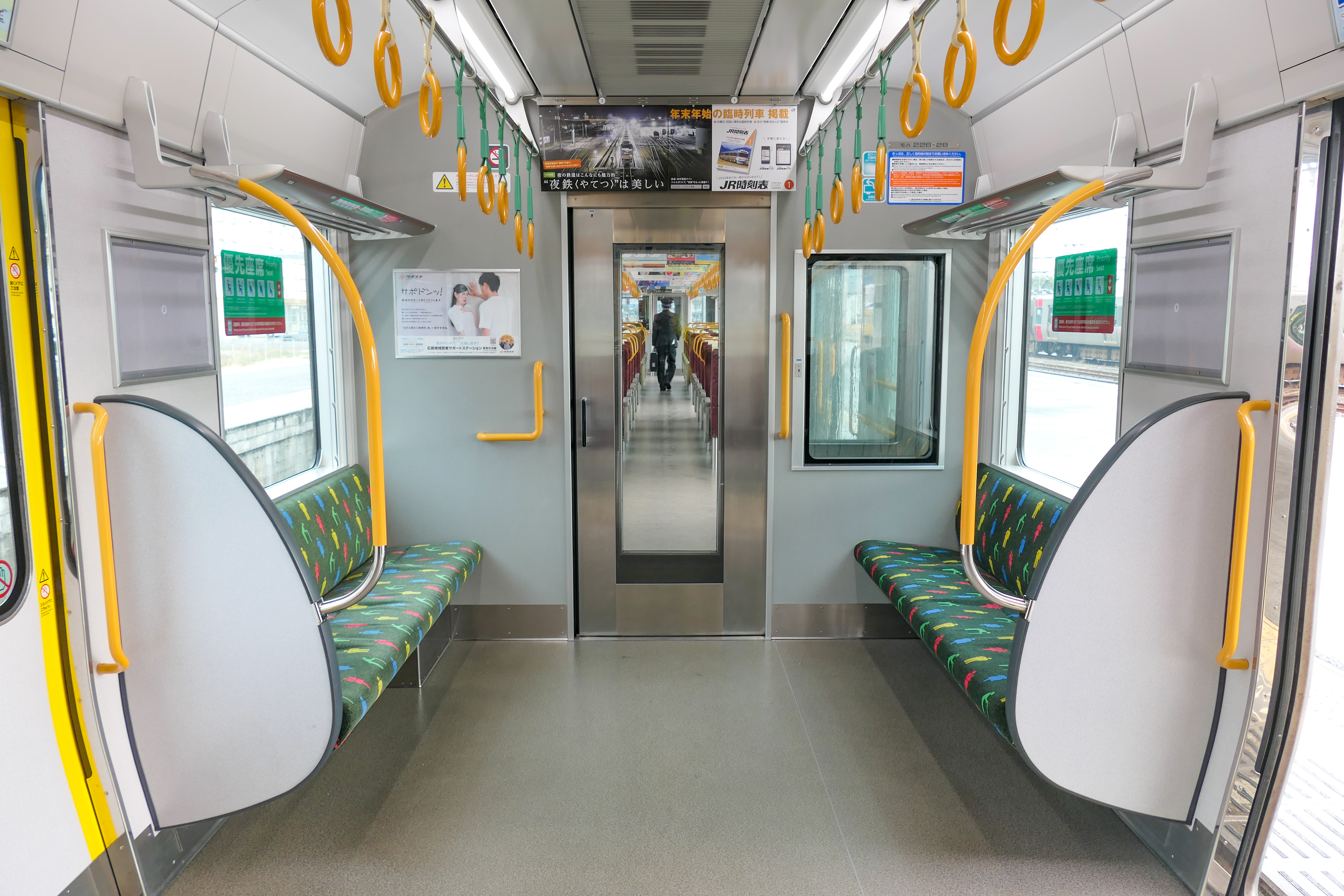
Priority seating

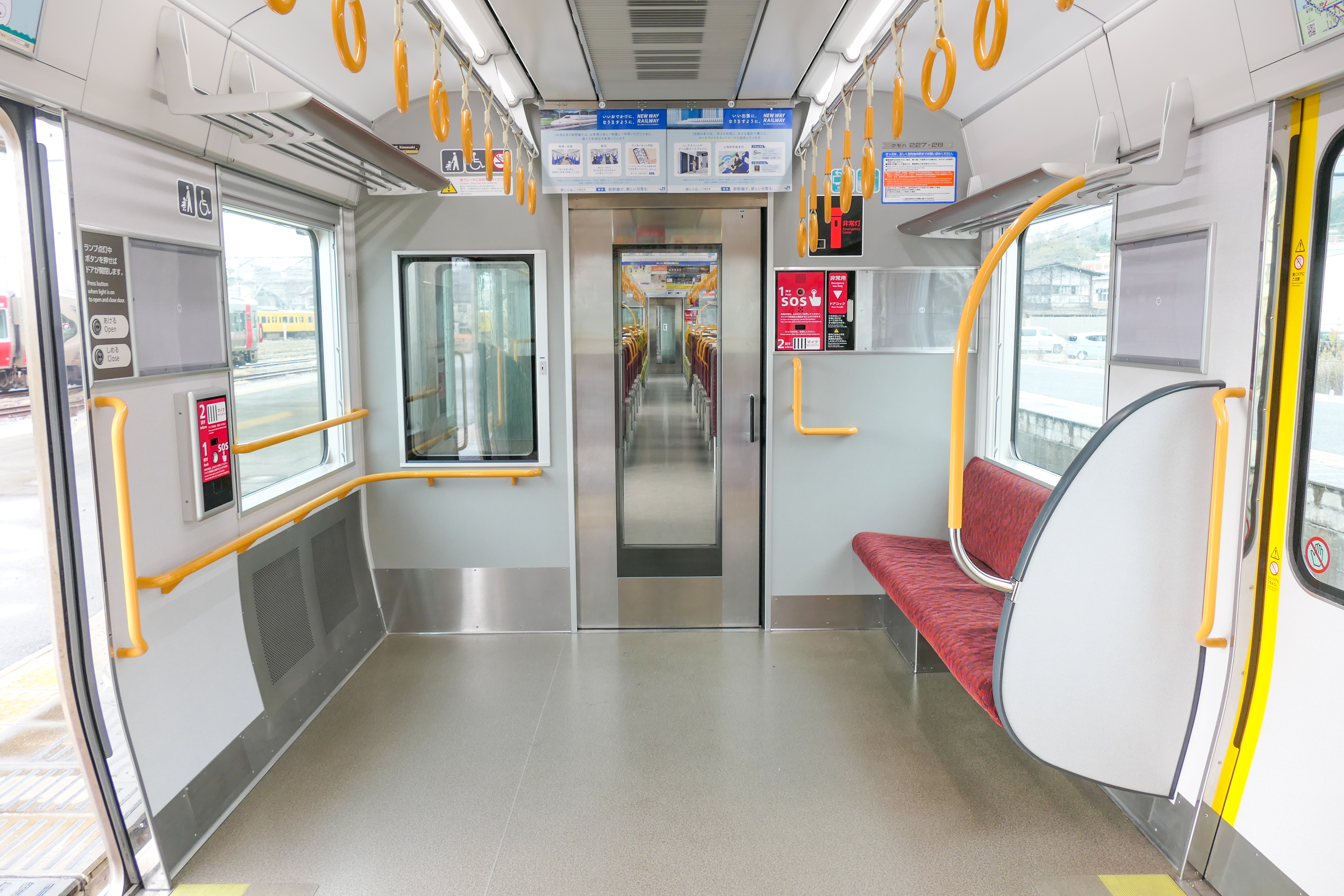
The wheelchair space at the end of a KuMoHa 227 car

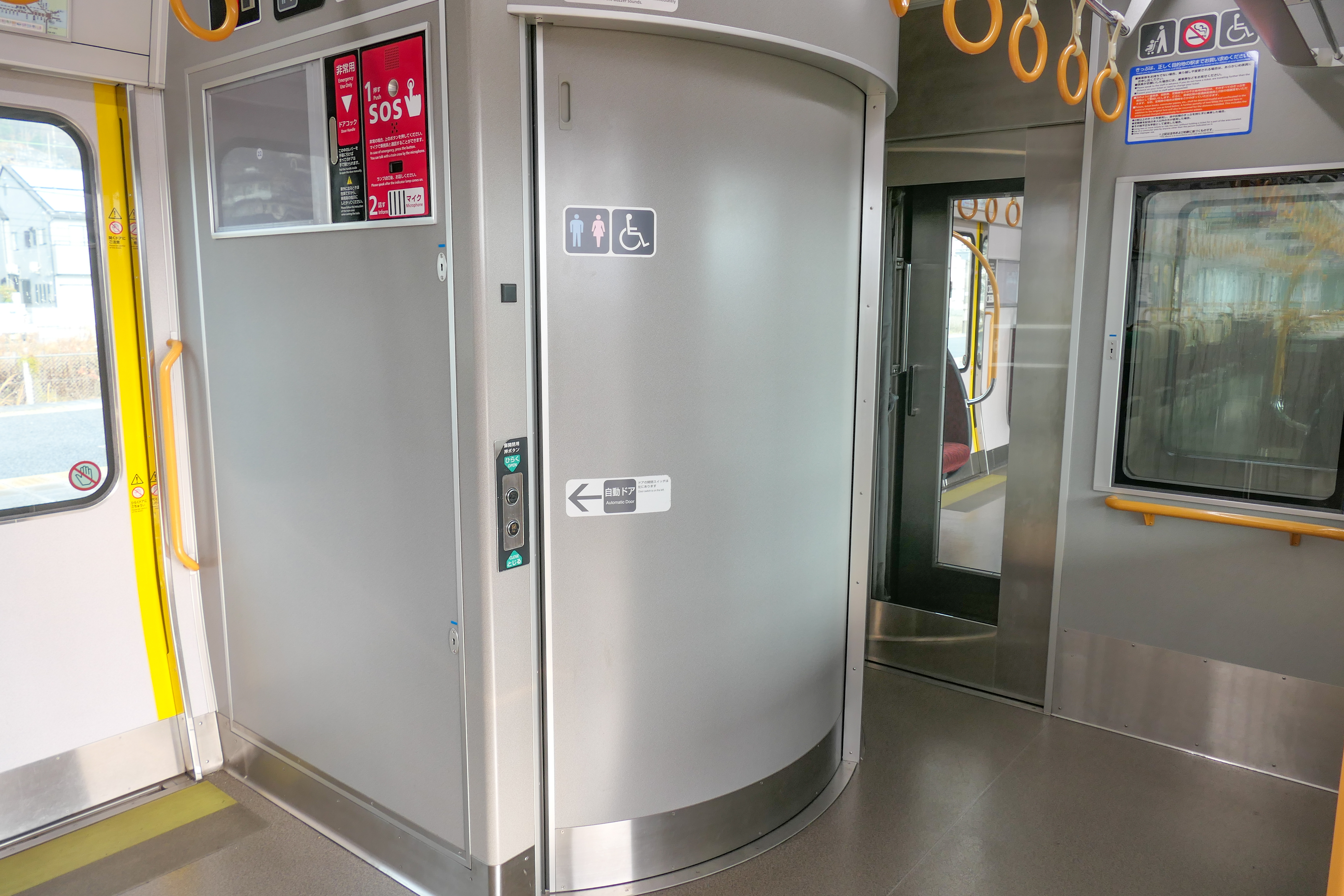
Toilet

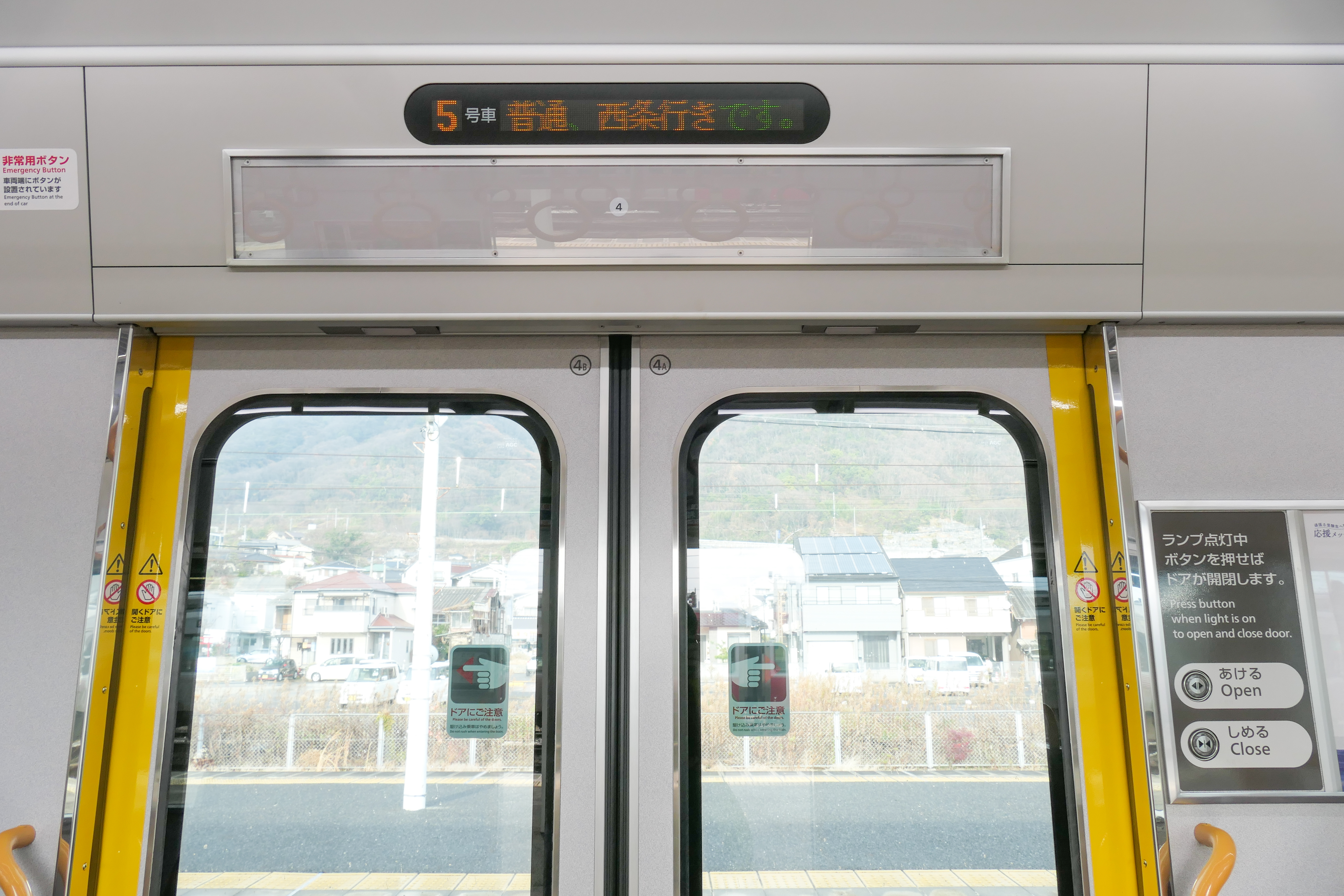
LED passenger information display

=== Fleet details ===
==== 3-car sets ====
Set No.	Manufacturer	Date delivered
A01	Kinki Sharyo	7 October 2014
A02	Kinki Sharyo	7 October 2014
A03	Kawasaki Heavy Industries	2 October 2014
A04	Kinki Sharyo	January 2015
A05	Kinki Sharyo	January 2015
A06	Kawasaki Heavy Industries	January 2015
A07	Kinki Sharyo	February 2015
A08	Kinki Sharyo	February 2015
A09	Kawasaki Heavy Industries	February 2015
A10	Kinki Sharyo	March 2015
A11 (Note: 2 cars transferred to A65.)	Kinki Sharyo	March 2015
A12	Kinki Sharyo	March 2015
A13	Kinki Sharyo	May 2015
A14	Kinki Sharyo	April 2015
A15	Kinki Sharyo	April 2015
A16	Kawasaki Heavy Industries	April 2015
A17	Kinki Sharyo	May 2015
A18	Kinki Sharyo	May 2015
A19	Kawasaki Heavy Industries	May 2015
A20	Kinki Sharyo	June 2015
A21	Kinki Sharyo	June 2015
A22	Kawasaki Heavy Industries	June 2015
A23	Kinki Sharyo	July 2015
A24	Kinki Sharyo	July 2015
A25	Kawasaki Heavy Industries	August 2015
A26	Kinki Sharyo	August 2015
A27	Kinki Sharyo	August 2015
A28	Kawasaki Heavy Industries	August 2015
A29	Kinki Sharyo	September 2015
A30	Kinki Sharyo	October 2015
A31	Kinki Sharyo	November 2015
A32	Kawasaki Heavy Industries	November 2015
A33 (Note: 1 car transferred to A65)	Kawasaki Heavy Industries	December 2015
A34	Kawasaki Heavy Industries	December 2015
A35	Kawasaki Heavy Industries	December 2015
A36	Kawasaki Heavy Industries	December 2015
A37	Kawasaki Heavy Industries	January 2016
A38	Kawasaki Heavy Industries	January 2016
A39	Kawasaki Heavy Industries	January 2016
A40	Kawasaki Heavy Industries	January 2016
A41	Kawasaki Heavy Industries	February 2016
A42	Kawasaki Heavy Industries	February 2016
A43	Kinki Sharyo	April 2018
A44	Kawasaki Heavy Industries	April 2018
A45	Kinki Sharyo	May 2018
A46	Kawasaki Heavy Industries	April 2018
A47	Kinki Sharyo	June 2018
A48	Kawasaki Heavy Industries	April 2018
A49	Kinki Sharyo	August 2018
A50	Kawasaki Heavy Industries	Around May 2018
A51	Kinki Sharyo	Around August 2018
A52	Kawasaki Heavy Industries	June 2018
A53	Kinki Sharyo	September 2018
A54	Kawasaki Heavy Industries	August 2018
A55	Kinki Sharyo	Around October 2018
A56	Kawasaki Heavy Industries	December 2018
A57	Kinki Sharyo	November 2018
A58	Kawasaki Heavy Industries	December 2018
A59	Kinki Sharyo	December 2018
A60	Kawasaki Heavy Industries	October 2018
A61	Kinki Sharyo	Around January 2019
A62	Kawasaki Heavy Industries	October 2018
A63	Kawasaki Heavy Industries	October 2018
A64	Kawasaki Heavy Industries	October 2018
A65 (Note: Made up of 1 car from A33 and 2 cars from A11; the remaining cars from these sets were scrapped in November 2023.)	N/A	November 2023

==== 2-car sets ====
Set No.	Manufacturer	Date delivered
S01	Kawasaki Heavy Industries	January 2015
S02	Kawasaki Heavy Industries	February 2015
S03	Kawasaki Heavy Industries	April 2015
S04		
S05		
S06		
S07		
S08		
S09		
S10		
S11		
S12		
S13		
S14		
S15		
S16		
S17		
S18		
S19	Kawasaki Heavy Industries	April 2018
S20		
S21		
S22	Kawasaki Heavy Industries	April 2018
S23		
S24		
S25	Kawasaki Heavy Industries	April 2018
S26		
S27		
S28	Kawasaki Heavy Industries	Around May 2018
S29	Kinki Sharyo	Around August 2018
S30	Kawasaki Heavy Industries	June 2018
S31		
S32	Kawasaki Heavy Industries	December 2018
S33	Kinki Sharyo	Around October 2018
S34		
S35	Kinki Sharyo	November 2018
S36	Kinki Sharyo	November 2018
S37	Kinki Sharyo	December 2018
S38	Kinki Sharyo	December 2018
S39	Kinki Sharyo	Around January 2019
S40	Kinki Sharyo	Around January 2019
S41	Kinki Sharyo	Around February 2019
S42	Kinki Sharyo	Around February 2019

=== Special liveries ===
On 23 September 2024, set A12 returned to service in the "Green Mover Max" livery used by the Hiroden 5100 series tramcars for the collaboration with Hiroshima City and Hiroshima Electric Railway. It is scheduled to operate in this livery until the end of fiscal 2026. In return, 5100 series set 5101 received the "Red Wing" livery used by the 227-0 series trains.

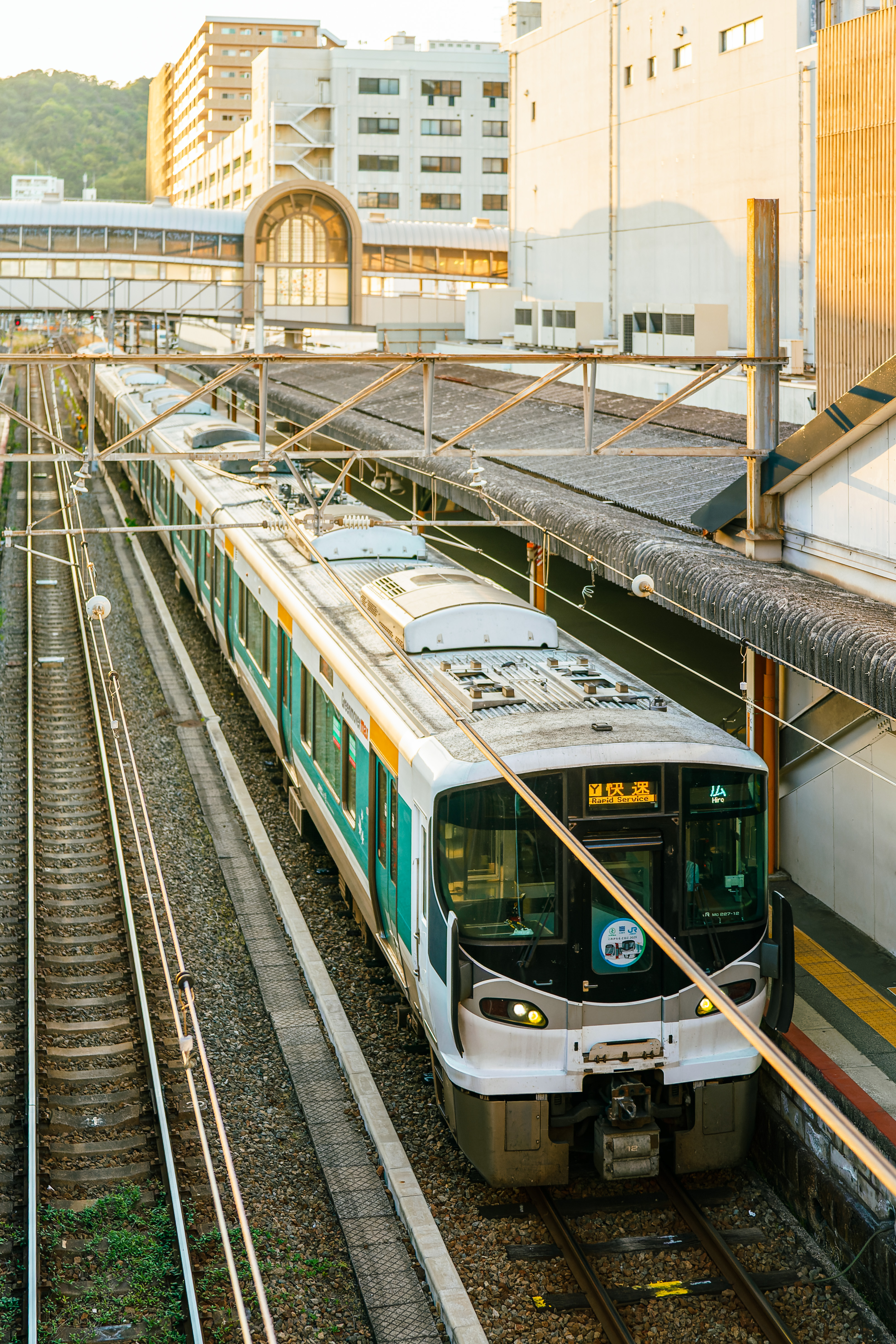
227-0 series 3-car set A12 in Hiroshima Electric Railway's "Green Mover Max" livery at Kure Station in May 2026

== 227-1000 series ==
227-1000 series
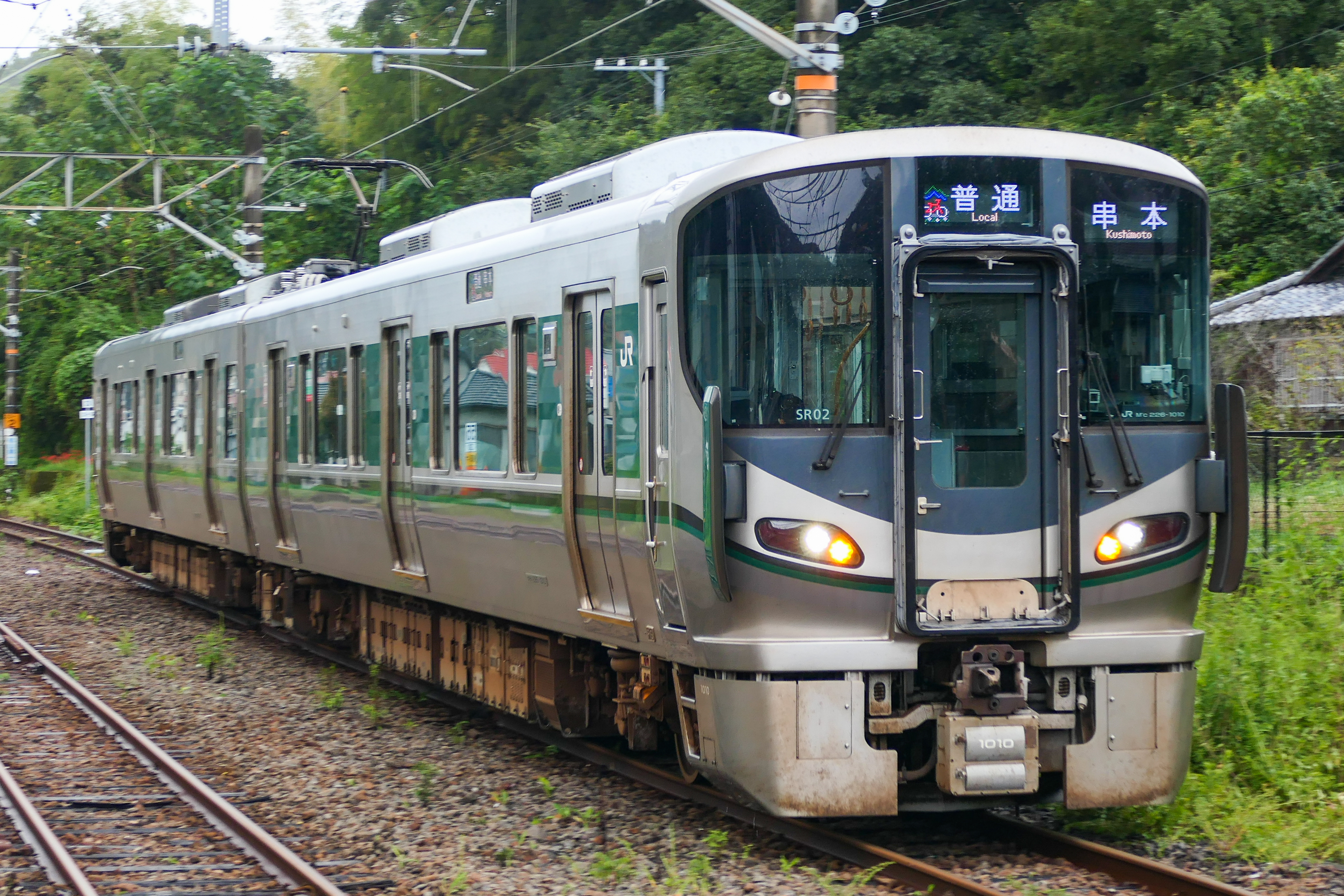
- A 227-1000 series set in September 2023
- In service: 16 March 2019 – present
- Manufacturer: Kawasaki Heavy Industries
- Replaced: 105 series; 117 series
- Constructed: 2018–2019
- Number built: 56 vehicles (28 sets)
- Formation: 2 cars per trainset
- Fleet numbers: SD01–SD08; SR01–SR14; SS01–SS06
- Depot: Hineno
- Lines served: W Kisei Main Line; U Sakurai Line; T Wakayama Line

In March 2018, JR West announced plans to introduce a new version of 227 series trains to Sakurai and Wakayama Lines, as well as part of Kisei Main Line, from Spring 2019. The planned 56-car fleet (28 sets of 2-car units) was completed by the end of September 2019, and would displace all 105 series and 117 series trains on the two lines by Spring 2020. Once the order is complete, the trains would have smart card readers on board, expanding ICOCA acceptance to all JR West service in Nara prefecture and on Wakayama Line.

The fleet entered service from 16 March 2019.

=== Formation ===
The sets are formed as follows.

Car No.	1	2
Designation	M'c	Mc
Numbering	KuMoHa 226-1000	KuMoHa 227-1000
Capacity (total)	130	137

- The seating capacity figures above include longitudinal seats in each car.
- The KuMoHa 227 car is fitted with a WPS28E single-arm pantograph.
- The SD sets are equipped with a second de-icing pantograph.
- The KuMoHa 226 car has a universal access toilet.

=== Interior ===
Passenger accommodation consists of longitudinal bench seating throughout. As the 227-1000 series trains are equipped for wanman (ワンマン; "one man") operation, doorways are equipped with ticket machines.

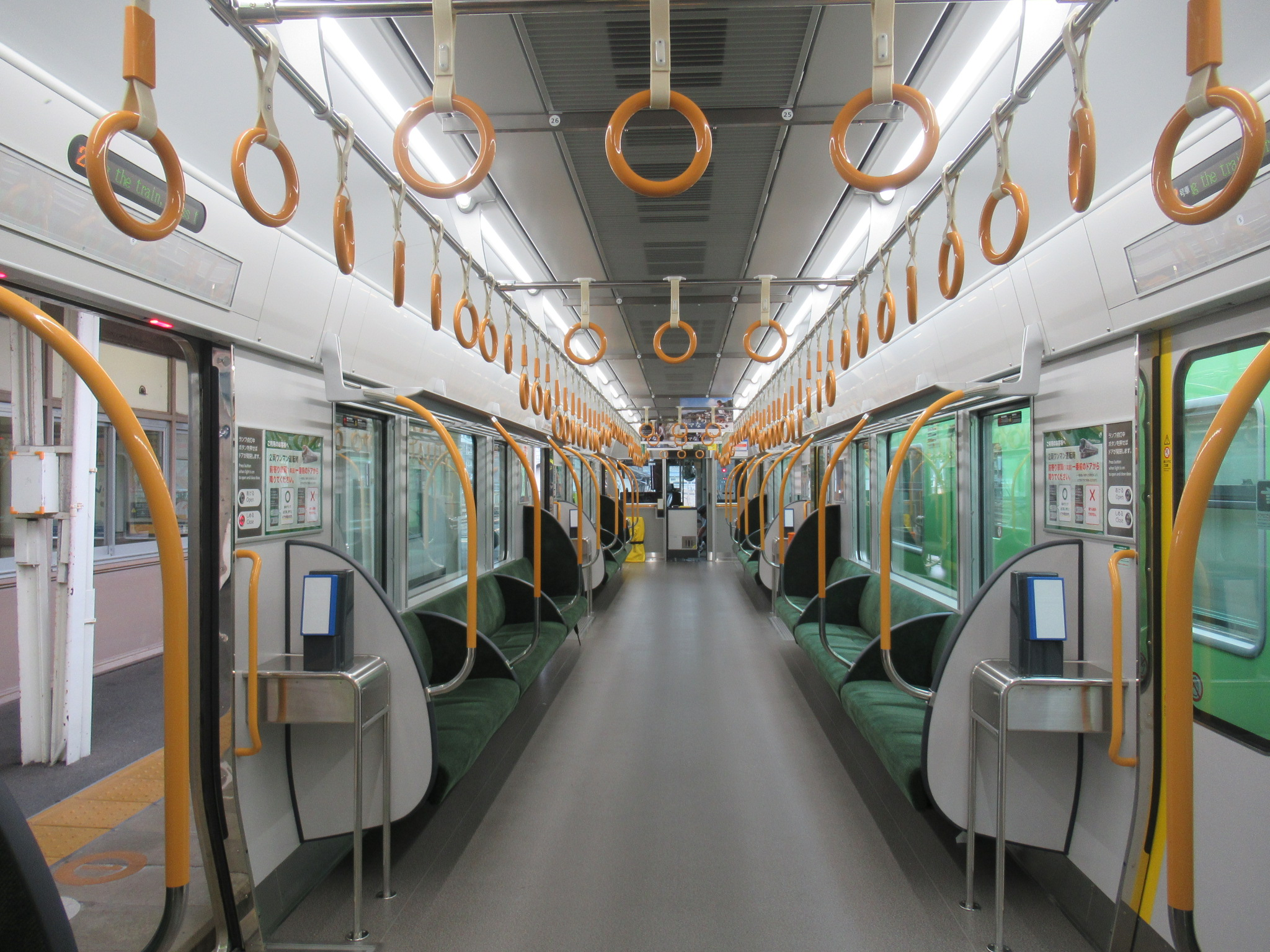
227-1000 series longitudinal seating, July 2019

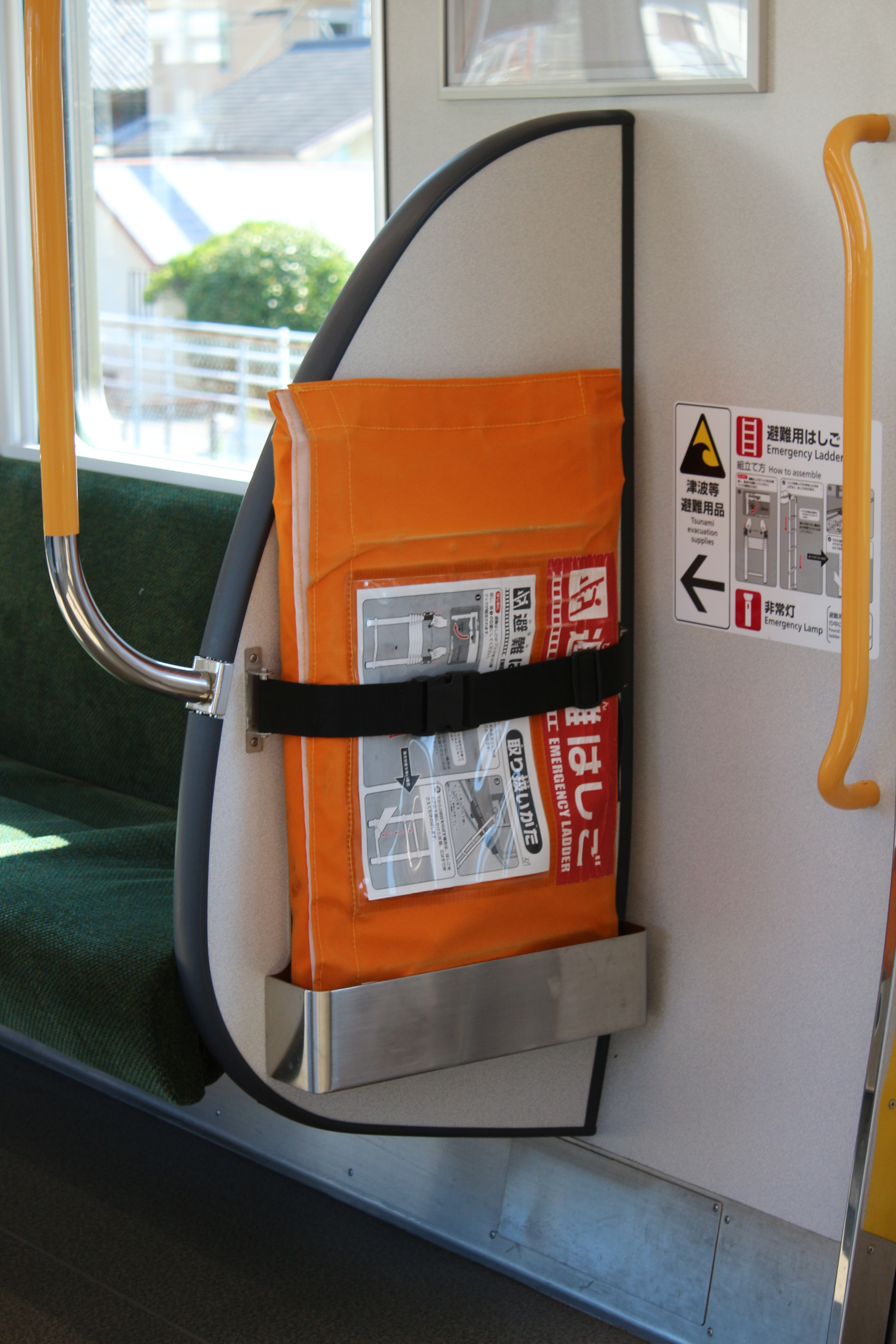
Emergency escape ladder adjacent to door

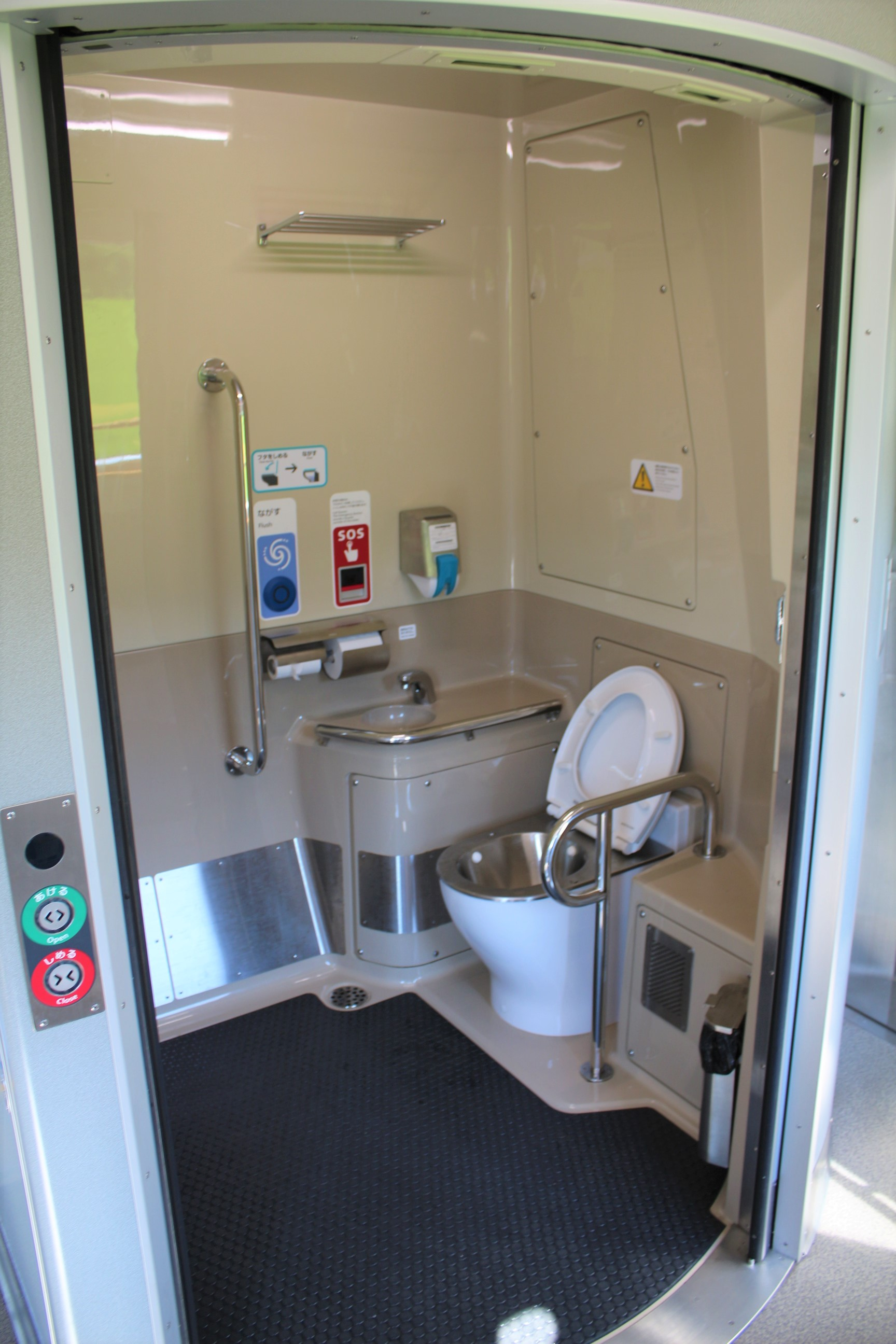
Toilet

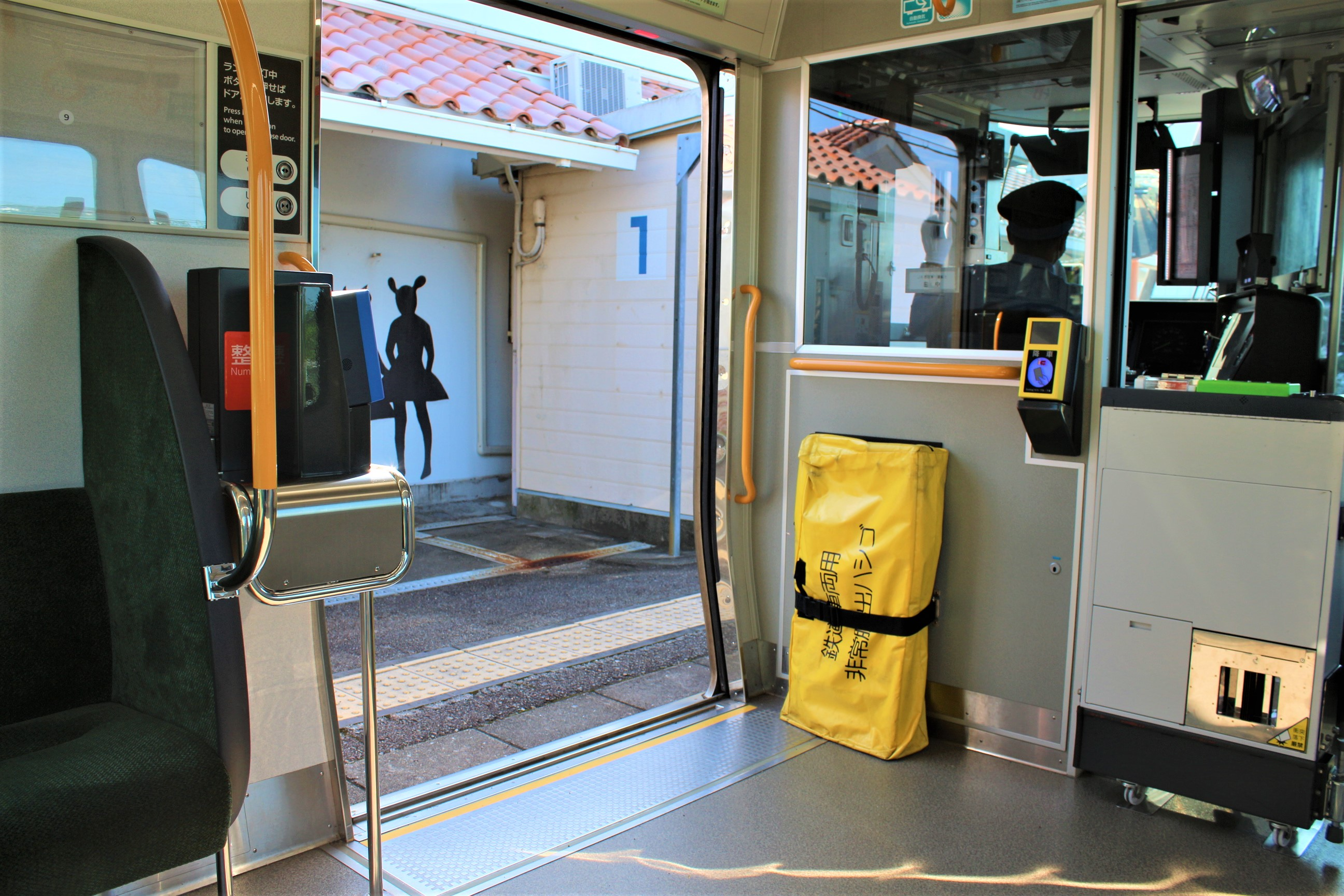
Ticket machines, July 2021

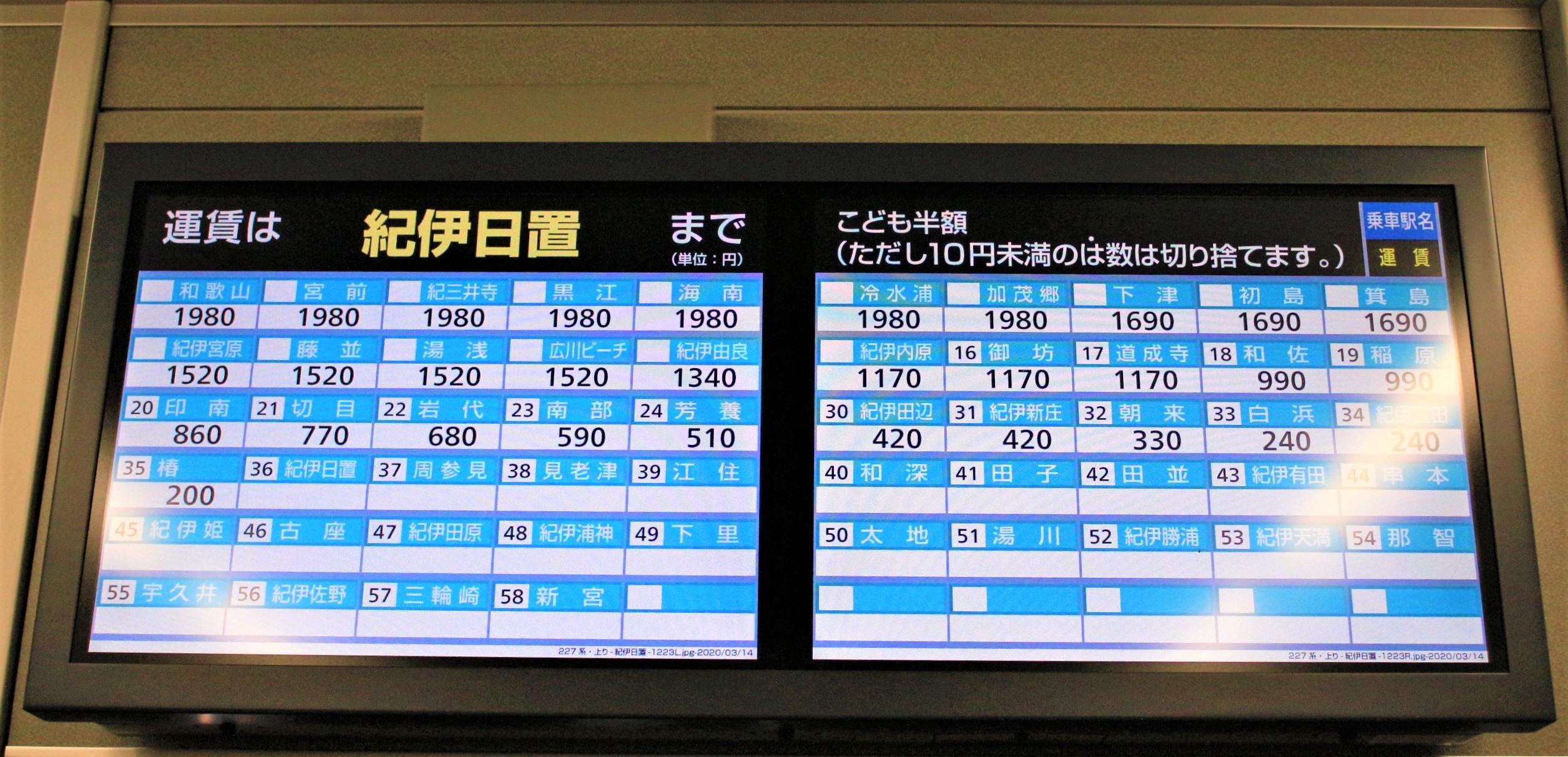
LCD fare chart, July 2021

=== Fleet details ===
Set No.	Date delivered
SD01	September 2018
SD02	September 2018
SD03	November 2018
SD04	November 2018
SD05	November 2018
SD06	December 2018
SD07	December 2018
SD08	December 2018
SR01	January 2019
SR02	January 2019
SR03	January 2019
SR04	February 2019
SR05	February 2019
SR06	March 2019
SR07	March 2019
SR08	March 2019
SR09	March 2019
SR10	March 2019
SR11	July 2019
SR12	July 2019
SR13	2019
SR14	2019
SS01	September 2019
SS02	September 2019
SS03	September 2019
SS04	September 2019
SS05	September 2019
SS06	September 2019

== 227-500 series ==
227-500 series Urara Kizashi
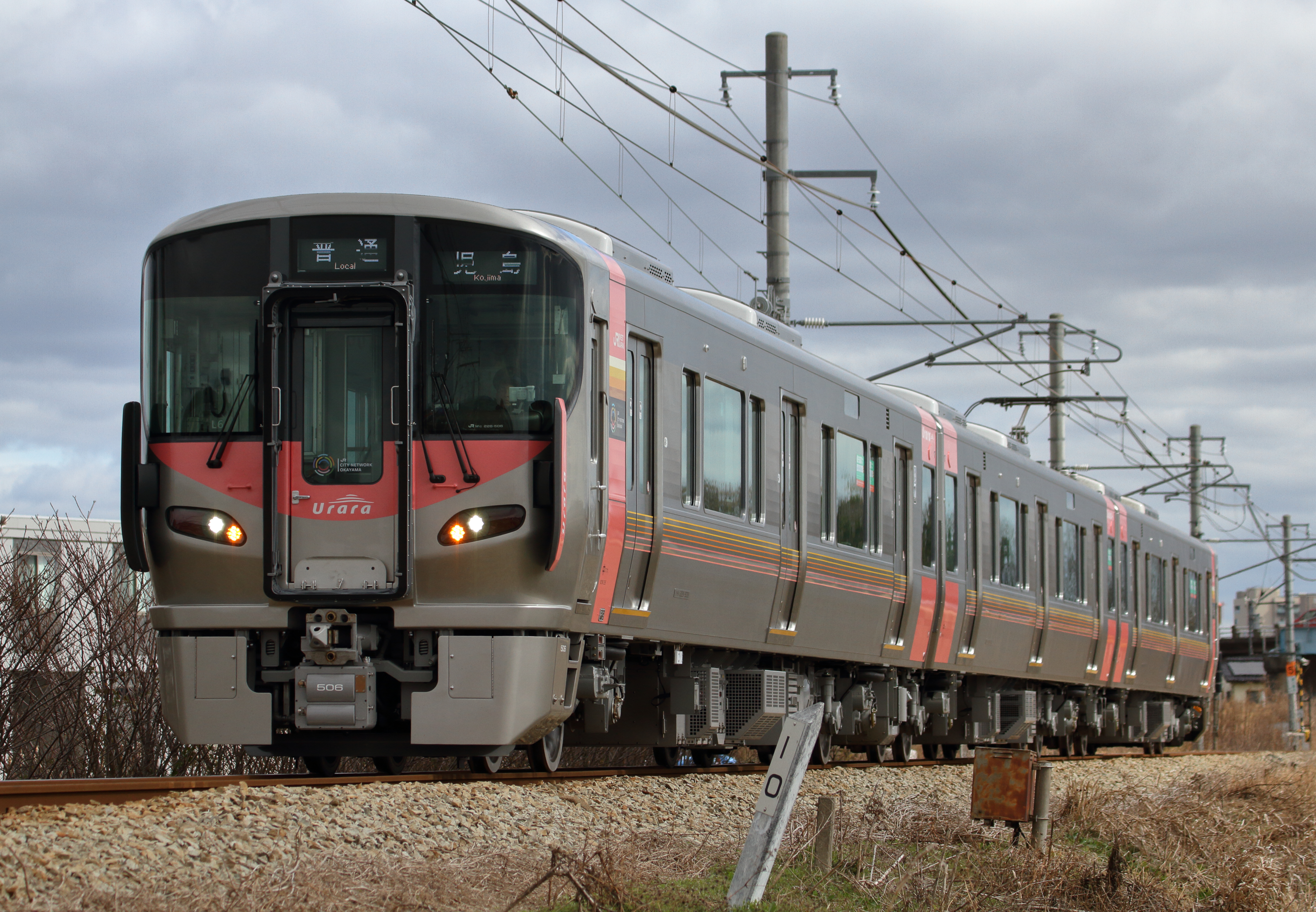
- A 227-500 series set in February 2024
- In service: 22 July 2023 – present
- Manufacturers: Kinki Sharyo; Kawasaki Railcar Mfg.
- Constructed: 2023–2026
- Number built: 233 vehicles; 47 × 3-car; 46 × 2-car
- Fleet numbers: L1–L41, V01–V06 (3-car sets); H1–H8, R1–R35, X01–X03 (2-car sets)
- Lines served: A S W X San'yō Main Line; V Hakubi Line; L Uno Line; M Honshi–Bisan Line; N Akō Line; A D San'in Main Line

The 227-500 series was first announced by JR West in May 2022 for use on rail lines serving Okayama and Bingo, such as the San'yō Line. Designated as 227-500 series, the first three sets were delivered from Kinki Sharyo in February 2023. By September 2024, 25 three-car sets and 13 two-car sets had been delivered. The series was given the brand name Urara (うらら) owing to a naming contest run by JR West. The sets carry a pink livery, which is associated with cherry blossoms as well as the softer climate experienced along the lines in which these trainsets will be running.

=== Kizashi variant ===
A 227-500 series set X01-X02 on 27 June 2026 between Ozuki Station and Chofu Station

On 30 October 2025, JR West announced plans to introduce new 227 series trainsets for use on the San'yō Main Line section that serves the Yamaguchi region. Six 3-car "V" sets and three 2-car "X" sets are to be built for use on services between Iwakuni and Shimonoseki. These trains will be branded Kizashi (きざし) and are planned to enter revenue service in around mid-2026, replacing ageing 115 series sets. As of 29 April 2026, their planned entry into service is scheduled to take place on 27 June of that year, which went head as scheduled at Shin-Yamaguchi Station.

=== Operational history ===
The first of these sets entered revenue service on 22 July 2023 on the San'yō Line and the Hakubi Line. As of October 2025, the Urara sets operate on the San'yō Line (Himeji – Mihara), the Hakubi Line (Kurashiki – Niizato), the Uno Line, the Seto-Ōhashi Line (Okayama – Kojima) and the Akō Line (Banshū-Akō – Higashi-Okayama).

On 19 September 2025, JR West announced its plans to introduce the 227‑500 series fleet on Akō Line services between Banshū-Akō and Higashi-Okayama from 12 October, and extend its operational range on the Hakubi Line to Niizato from 15 October.

In December 2025, JR West announced its plans to further extend the operational range of the 227‑500 series on the Hakubi Line to Hōki-Daisen and begin operating the subseries on San'in Main Line services between Hōki-Daisen and Nishi-Izumo from the start of the revised timetable on 14 March 2026.

=== Exterior ===
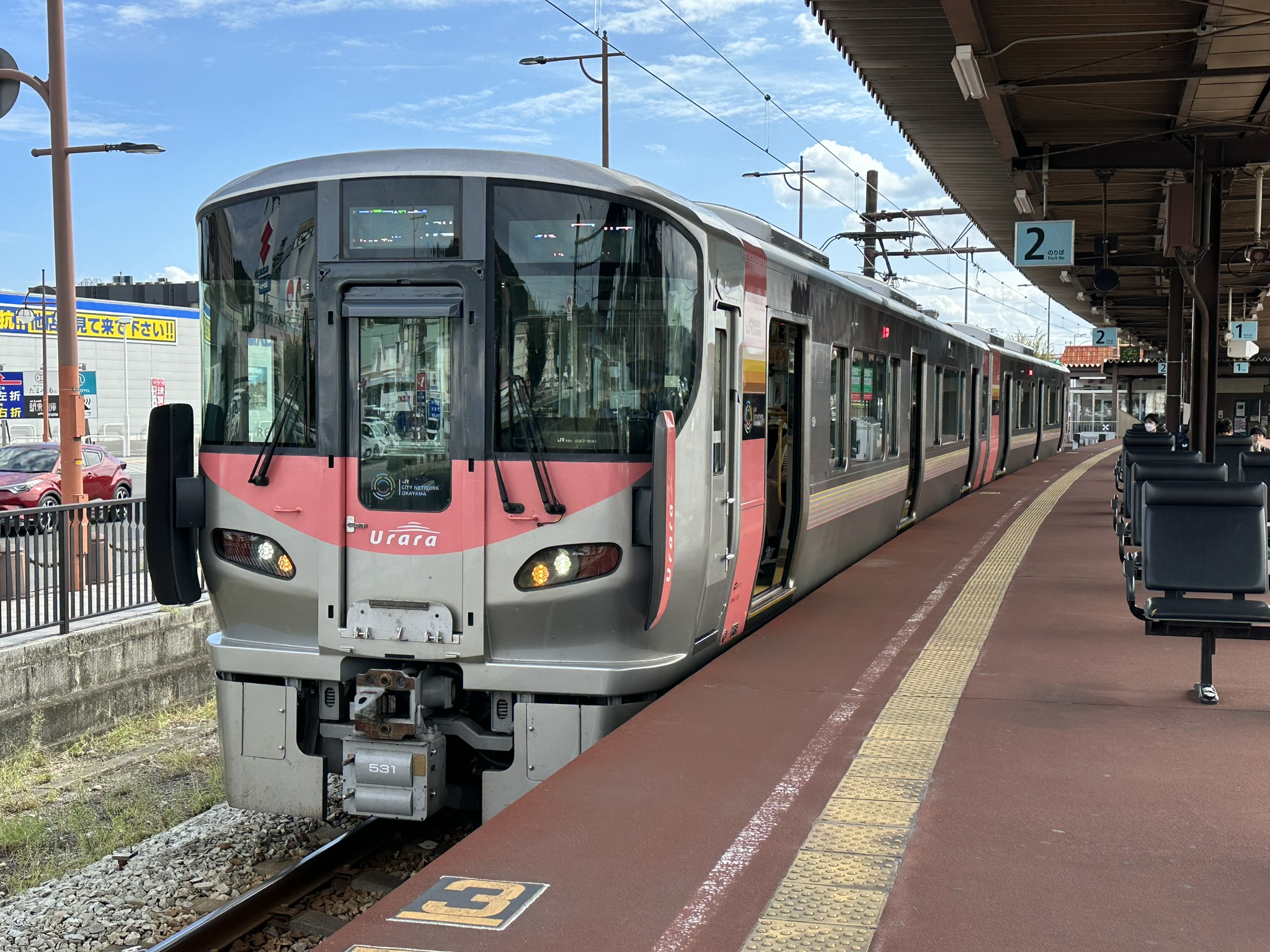
2-car set R6 at Uno Station

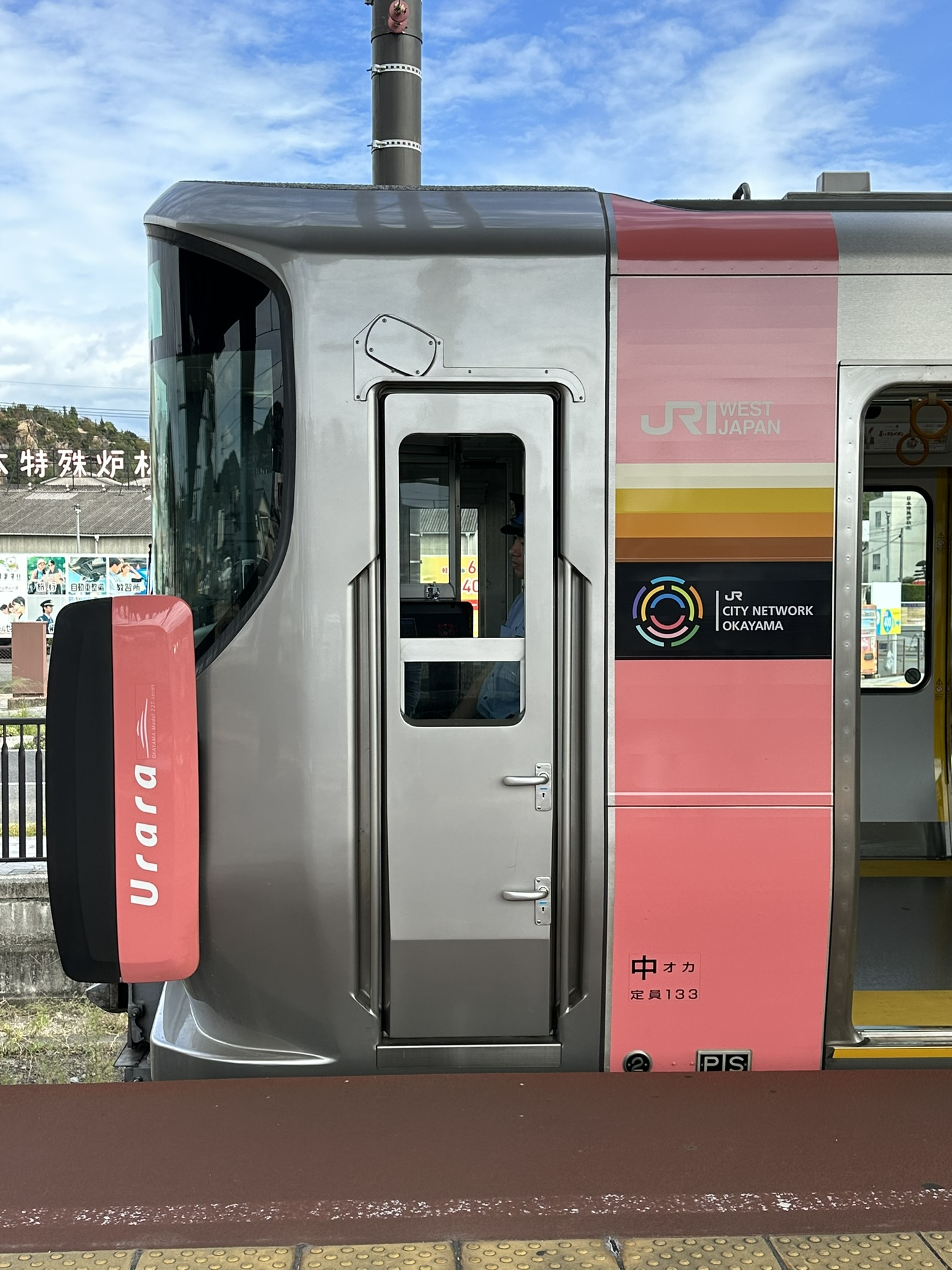
"Urara" anti-fall plate and branding for JR West Okayama City Network

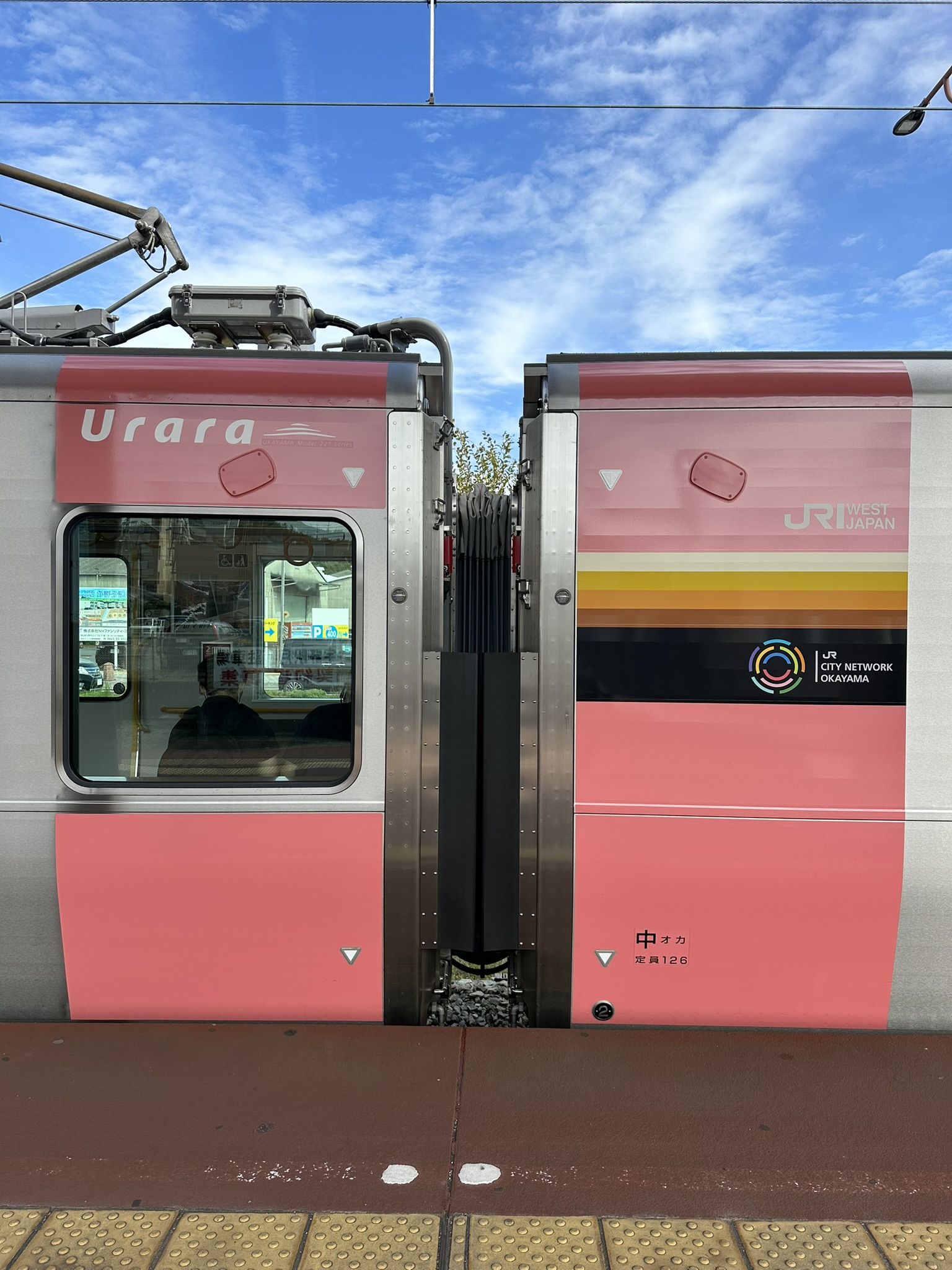
Branding on car ends for "Urara" and JR West Okayama City Network

=== Interior ===
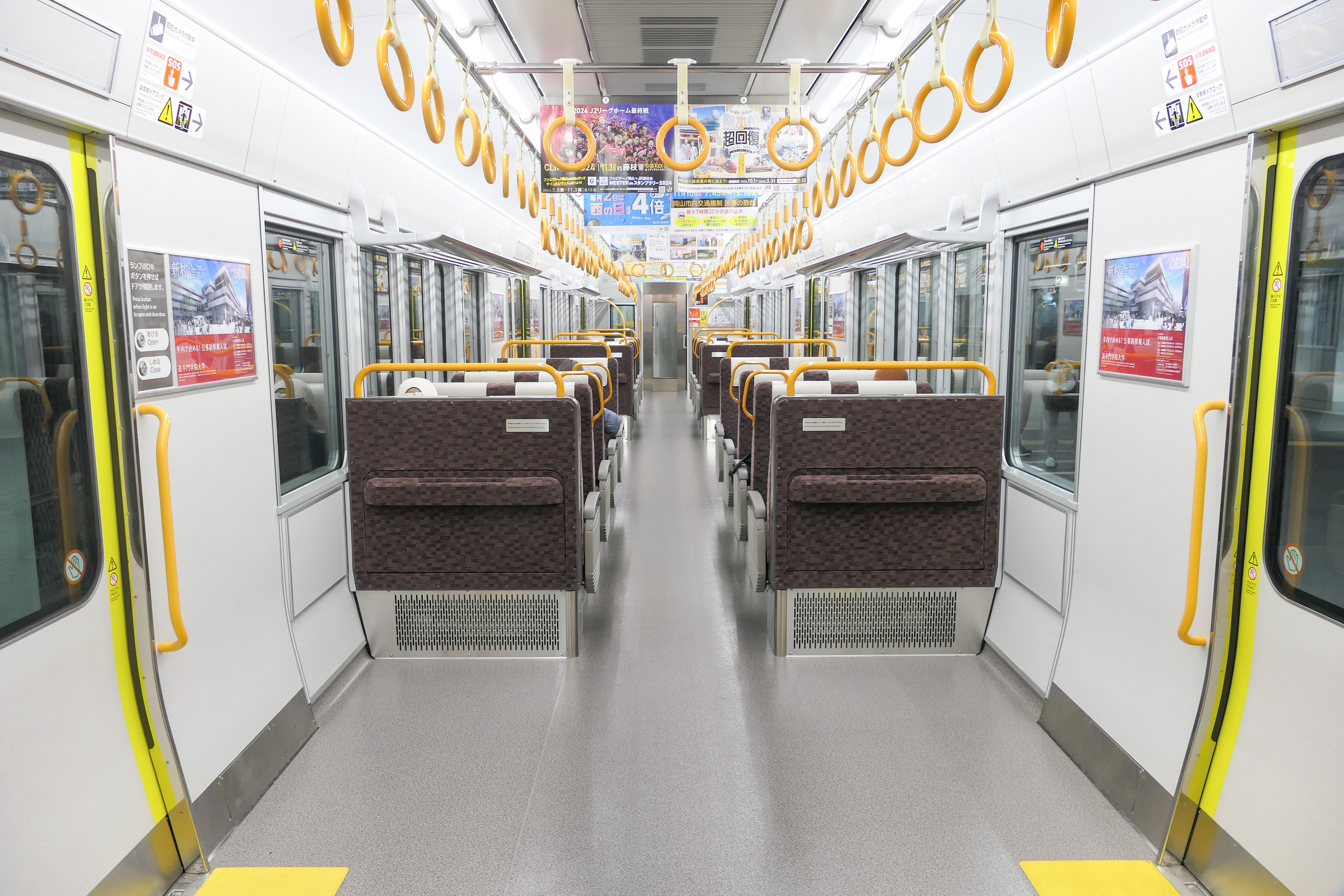
227-500 series transverse seating

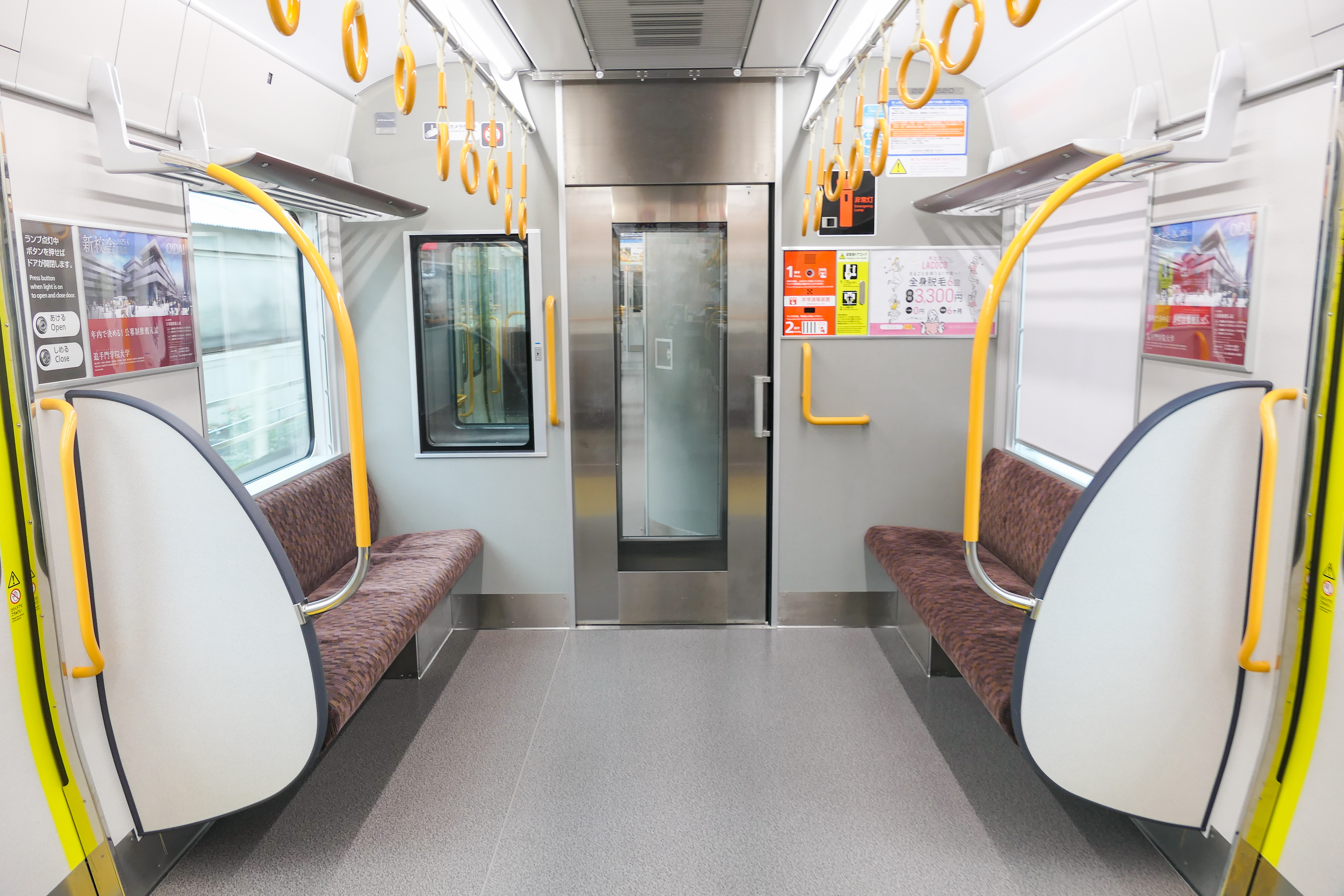
Priority seating

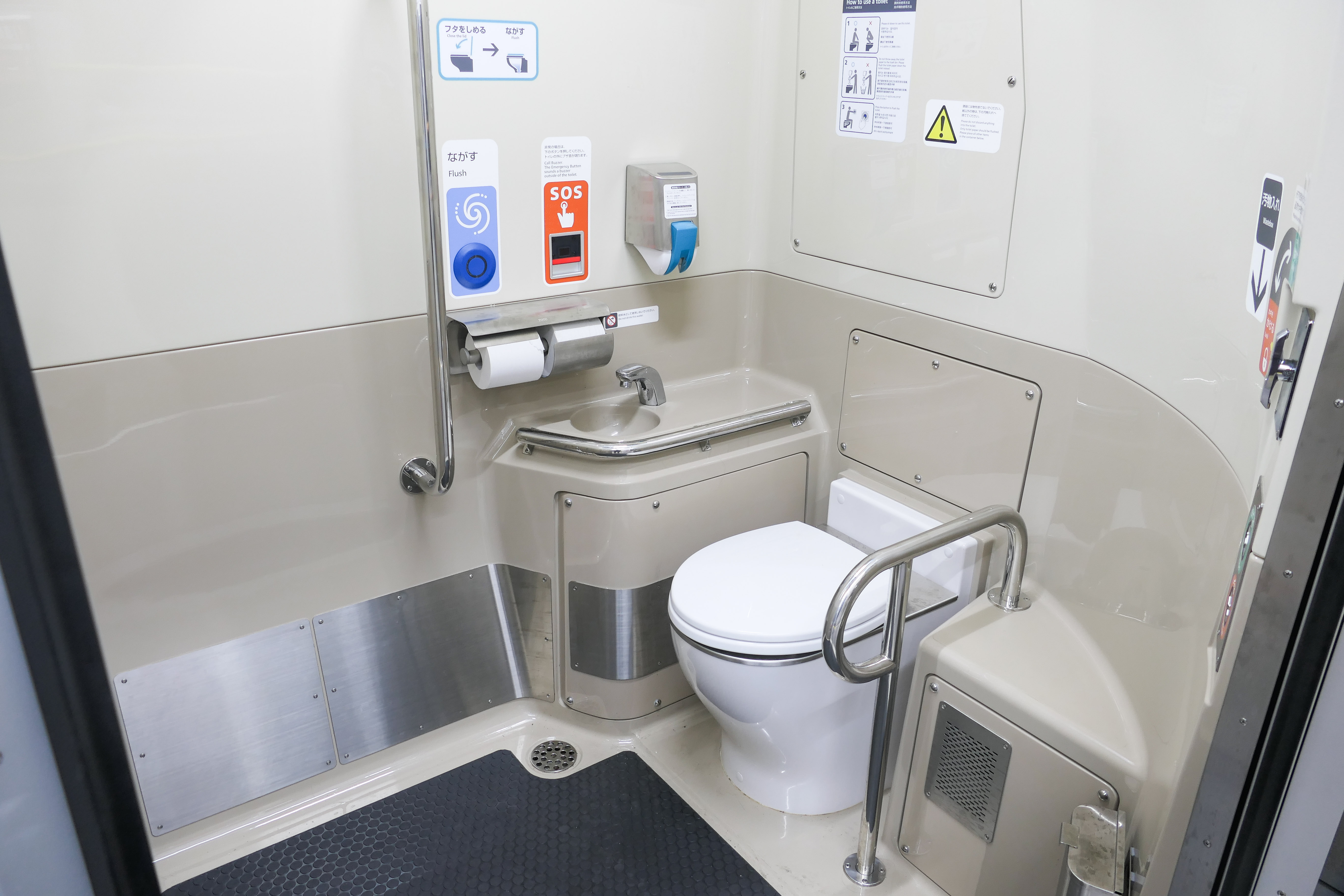
Toilet

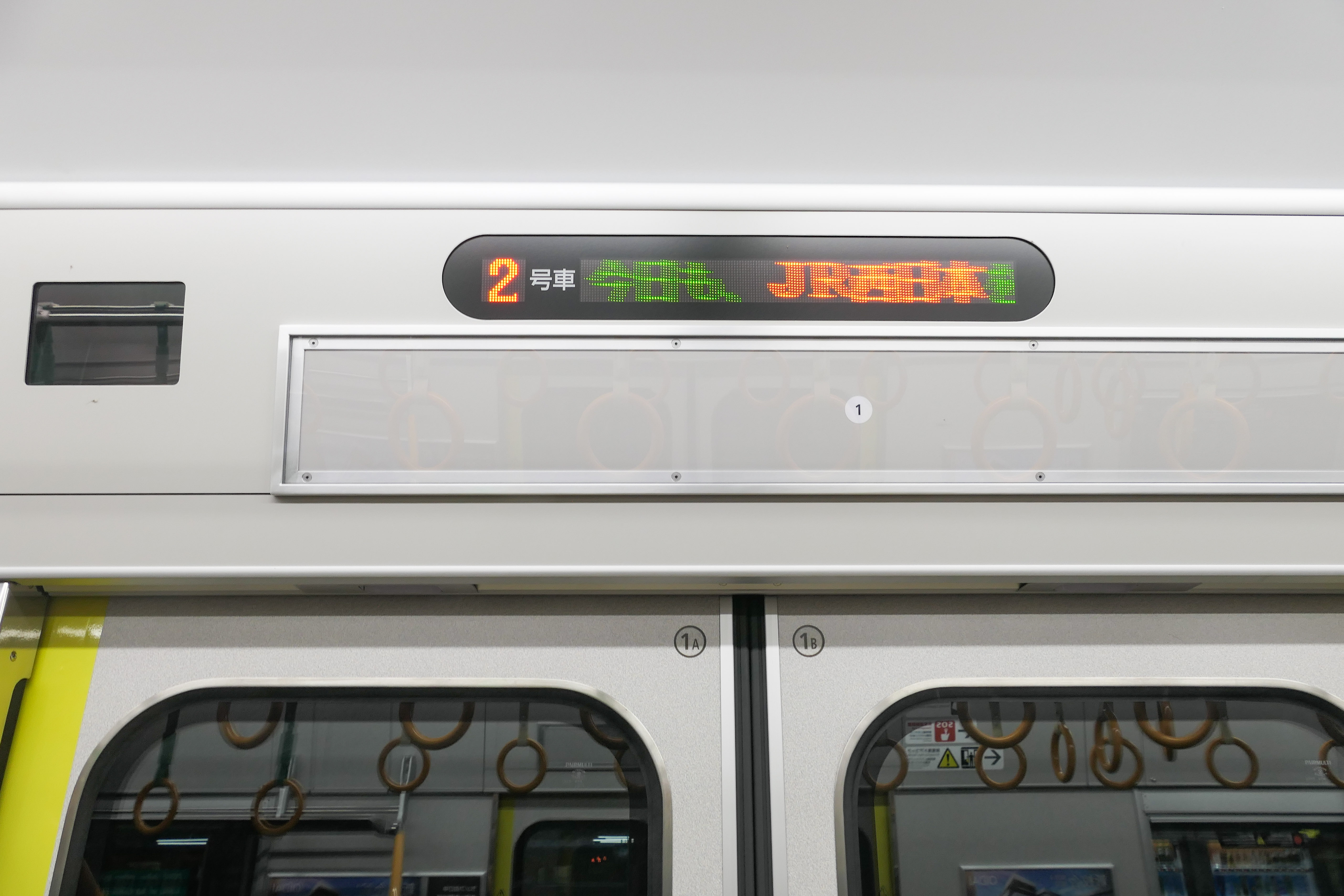
LED passenger information display

=== Fleet details ===
==== 3-car sets ====
Set No.	Manufacturer	Date delivered
L1	Kawasaki Railcar Mfg.	May 2024
L2	Kawasaki Railcar Mfg.	May 2024
L3	Kinki Sharyo	November 2023
L4	Kinki Sharyo	November 2023
L5	Kinki Sharyo	December 2023
L6	Kinki Sharyo	December 2023
L7	Kinki Sharyo	February 2024
L8	Kinki Sharyo	February 2024
L9	Kinki Sharyo	February 2024
L10	Kinki Sharyo	March 2024
L11	Kinki Sharyo	March 2024
L12	Kinki Sharyo	March 2024
L13	Kinki Sharyo	March 2024
L14	Kinki Sharyo	March 2024
L15	Kinki Sharyo	March 2024
L16	Kawasaki Railcar Mfg.	June 2024
L17	Kawasaki Railcar Mfg.	June 2024
L20	Kawasaki Railcar Mfg.	31 July 2024
L21	Kawasaki Railcar Mfg.	31 July 2024
L22	Kawasaki Railcar Mfg.	August 2024
L23	Kawasaki Railcar Mfg.	August 2024
L24	Kawasaki Railcar Mfg.	September 2024
L25	Kawasaki Railcar Mfg.	September 2024
L26	Kinki Sharyo	March 2025
L27	Kinki Sharyo	March 2025
L28	Kinki Sharyo	April 2025
L29	Kinki Sharyo	April 2025
L30	Kinki Sharyo	May 2025
L31	Kinki Sharyo	May 2025
L32	Kinki Sharyo	May 2025
L33	Kinki Sharyo	June 2025
L34	Kinki Sharyo	July 2025
L35	Kinki Sharyo	July 2025
L36	Kinki Sharyo	August 2025
L37	Kinki Sharyo	September 2025
L38	Kinki Sharyo	September 2025
L39	Kinki Sharyo	September 2025
L40	Kinki Sharyo	October 2025
L41	Kinki Sharyo	October 2025
V01	Kinki Sharyo	February 2026
V02	Kinki Sharyo	March 2026
V03	Kinki Sharyo	March 2026
V04	Kinki Sharyo	April 2026
V05	Kinki Sharyo	April 2026
V06	Kinki Sharyo	April 2026

==== 2-car sets ====
Set No.	Manufacturer	Date delivered
H1	Kinki Sharyo	December 2025
H2	Kinki Sharyo	January 2026
H3	Kinki Sharyo	January 2026
H4	Kinki Sharyo	January 2026
H5	Kinki Sharyo	February 2026
H6	Kinki Sharyo	February 2026
H7	Kinki Sharyo	February 2026
H8	Kinki Sharyo	February 2026
R1	Kinki Sharyo	February 2023
R2	Kinki Sharyo	February 2023
R3	Kinki Sharyo	February 2023
R4	Kinki Sharyo	9 March 2023
R5	Kinki Sharyo	9 March 2023
R6	Kinki Sharyo	23 March 2023
R7	Kinki Sharyo	23 March 2023
R8	Kinki Sharyo	23 March 2023
R9	Kawasaki Railcar Mfg.	December 2023
R10	Kinki Sharyo	November 2023
R11	Kinki Sharyo	December 2023
R12	Kawasaki Railcar Mfg.	December 2023
R13	Kawasaki Railcar Mfg.	December 2023
R14	Kinki Sharyo	March 2025
R15	Kinki Sharyo	March 2025
R16	Kinki Sharyo	March 2025
R17	Kinki Sharyo	March 2025
R18	Kinki Sharyo	April 2025
R19	Kinki Sharyo	May 2025
R20	Kinki Sharyo	May 2025
R21	Kinki Sharyo	May 2025
R22	Kinki Sharyo	June 2025
R23	Kinki Sharyo	June 2025
R24	Kinki Sharyo	July 2025
R25	Kinki Sharyo	August 2025
R26	Kinki Sharyo	August 2025
R27	Kinki Sharyo	September 2025
R28	Kinki Sharyo	September 2025
R29	Kinki Sharyo	September 2025
R30	Kinki Sharyo	October 2025
R31	Kinki Sharyo	November 2025
R32	Kinki Sharyo	November 2025
R33	Kinki Sharyo	November 2025
R34	Kinki Sharyo	December 2025
R35	Kinki Sharyo	December 2025
X01	Kinki Sharyo	April 2026
X02	Kinki Sharyo	April 2026
X03	Kinki Sharyo	April 2026

- The H sets are equipped with a second de-icing pantograph.
