= Chōfu Station =

Chōfu Station is the name of multiple train stations in Japan.

- Chōfu Station (Tokyo) - (調布駅) in Tokyo
- Chōfu Station (Yamaguchi) - (長府駅) in Yamaguchi Prefecture
