= Habu Station =

Railway station in San'yō-Onoda, Yamaguchi Prefecture, Japan

Habu Station 埴生駅
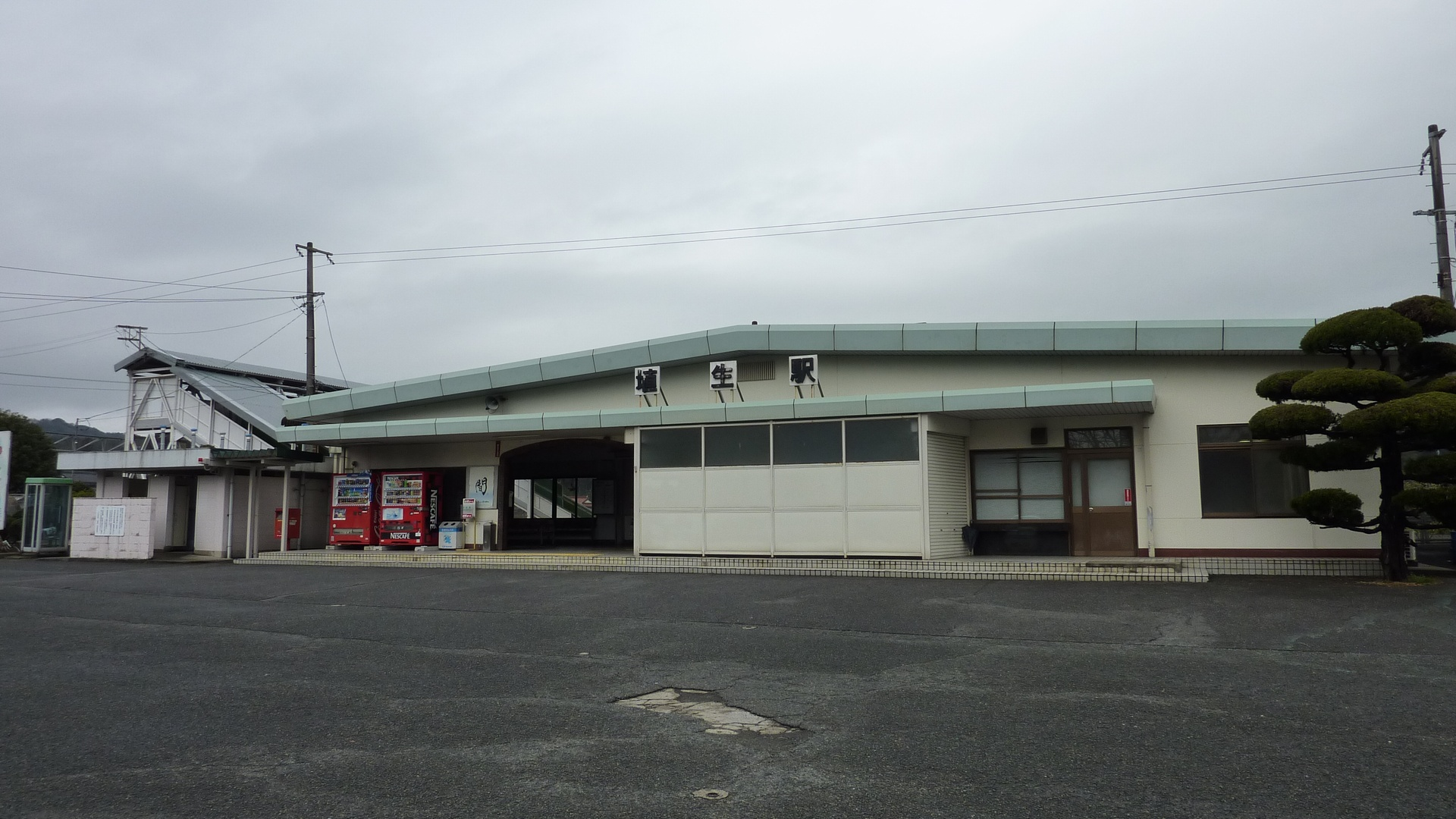
- Habu Station in February 2010

General information
- Location: Habu, San'yō-Onoda-shi, Yamaguchi-ken 757-0012; Japan
- Coordinates: 34°2′57.02″N 131°5′12.71″E
- Owner: West Japan Railway Company
- Operator: West Japan Railway Company
- Line: San'yō Line
- Distance: 502.6 km (312.3 miles) from Kobe
- Platforms: 1 side + 1 island platform
- Tracks: 3
- Connections: Bus stop

Other information
- Status: Unstaffed
- Website: Official website

History
- Opened: 27 May 1901

Passengers
- FY2022: 256

Services
Preceding station	JR West	Following station
Ozuki towards Shimonoseki	San'yō Line Local	Asa towards Iwakuni
Location
- Location within Yamaguchi Prefecture Location within Japan

Habu Station (埴生駅, Habu-eki) is a passenger railway station located in the city of San'yō-Onoda, Yamaguchi Prefecture, Japan. It is operated by the West Japan Railway Company (JR West).

== Lines ==
Habu Station is served by the JR West San'yō Main Line, and is located 502.6 kilometers from the terminus of the line at Kobe.

== Station layout ==
The station consists of one side platform and one island platform connected by a footbridge; however, the middle track (Platform 2) is out of service and there is no overhead wire. The station is unattended.

== Platforms ==
1	■ San'yō Line	for Shimonoseki
2	■ San'yō Line	<out of service>
3	■ San'yō Line	for Shin-Yamaguchi and Tokuyama

== History ==
Habu Station was opened on 27 May 1901 on the San'yō Railway when the line was extended from Asa Station to Bakan Station (present-day Shimonoseki Station). The San'yō Railway was railway nationalized in 1906 and the line renamed the San'yō Main Line in 1909. With the privatization of the Japan National Railway (JNR) on 1 April 1987, the station came under the aegis of the West Japan Railway Company (JR West).

== Passenger statistics ==
In fiscal 2022, the station was used by an average of 256 passengers daily.

== Surrounding area ==
- Japan National Route 2 Asa-Habu Bypass
- Sanyo Auto Race Course

== See also ==
- List of railway stations in Japan
