= Ozuki Station =

Railway station in Shimonoseki, Yamaguchi Prefecture, Japan

Ozuki Station 小月駅
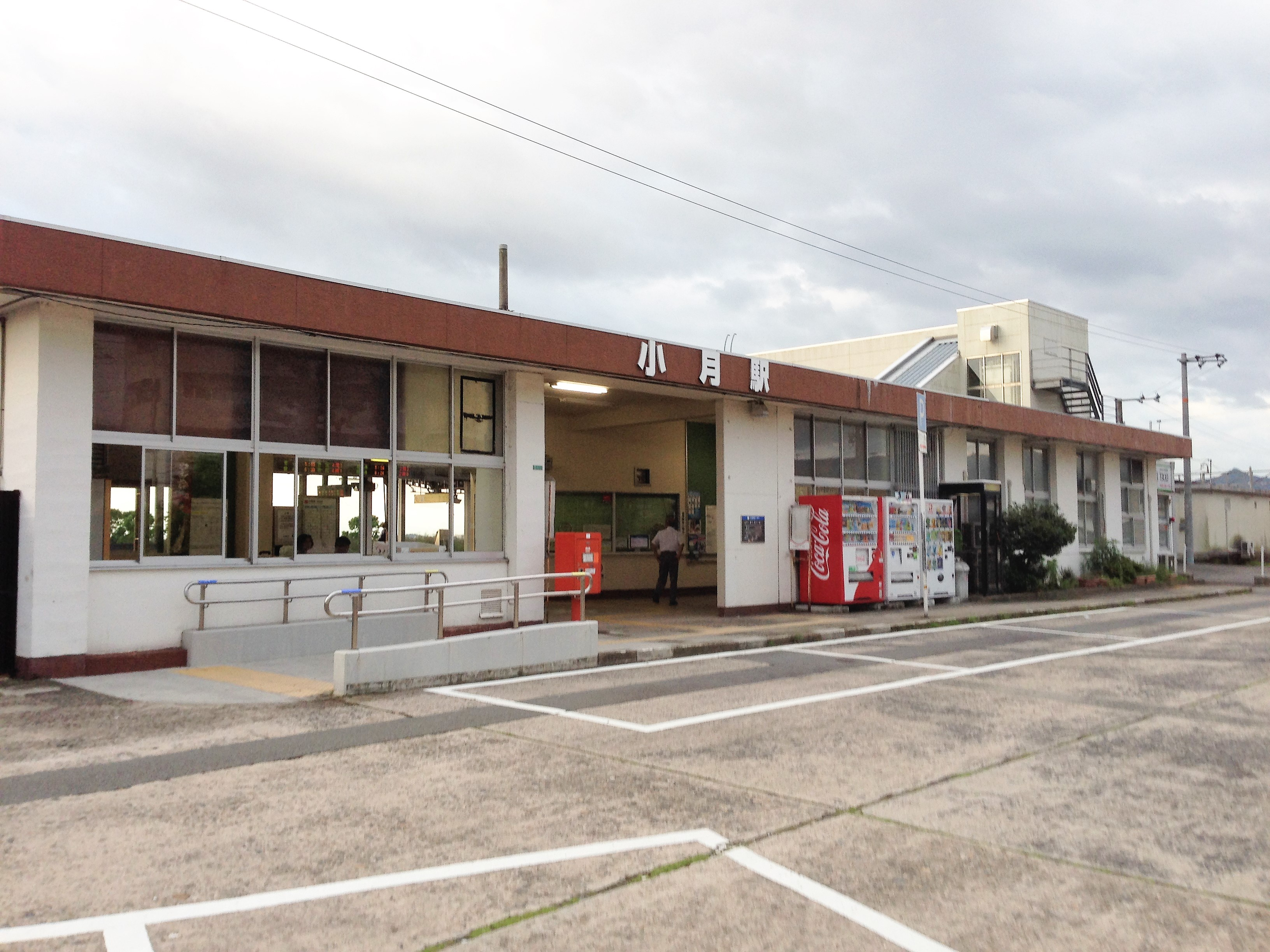
- Ozuki Station in 2016

General information
- Location: 1-chōme-8 Ozuki Ekimae, Shimonoseki-shi, Yamaguchi-ken 750-1143; Japan
- Coordinates: 34°4′5.06″N 131°1′58.1″E
- Owner: West Japan Railway Company
- Operator: West Japan Railway Company
- Line: San'yō Line
- Distance: 508.8 km (316.2 miles) from Kobe
- Platforms: 1 side + 1 island platform
- Tracks: 3
- Connections: Bus stop

Other information
- Status: Staffed
- Website: Official website

History
- Opened: 27 May 1901

Passengers
- FY2022: 1630

Services
Preceding station	JR West	Following station
Chōfu towards Shimonoseki	San'yō Line Local	Habu towards Iwakuni
Location
- Location within Yamaguchi Prefecture Location within Japan

Ozuki Station (小月駅, Ozuki-eki) is a passenger railway station located in the city of Shimonoseki, Yamaguchi Prefecture, Japan. It is operated by the West Japan Railway Company (JR West).

== Lines ==
Ozuki Station is served by the JR West San'yō Main Line, and is located 508.8 kilometers from the terminus of the line at Kobe.

== Station layout ==
The station consists of one side platform and one island platform. The station building is located on the side of Platform 1, which is the side platform, and is connected to the island platform via a footbridge. The inbound main line is at Platform 1, and the outbound main line is at Platform 3. The middle line (Platform 2) is used for turning back of regional trains. The station is staffed.

== Platforms ==
1	■ San'yō Line	for Shin-Yamaguchi and Tokuyama
2, 3	■ San'yō Line	for Shimonoseki

== History ==
Ozuki Station was opened on 27 May 1901 on the San'yō Railway when the line was extended from Asa Station to Bakan Station (present-day Shimonoseki Station). The San'yō Railway was railway nationalized in 1906 and the line renamed the San'yō Main Line in 1909. With the privatization of the Japan National Railway (JNR) on 1 April 1987, the station came under the aegis of the West Japan Railway Company (JR West).

== Passenger statistics ==
In fiscal 2022, the station was used by an average of 1630 passengers daily.

== Surrounding area ==
- Japan National Route 491
- Japan Maritime Self-Defense Force Kozuki Air Base
- Shimonoseki Municipal Eastern Junior High School
- Shimonoseki Municipal Kozuki Elementary School
- Shimonoseki Municipal Seisue Elementary School

== See also ==
- List of railway stations in Japan
