= Chōfu Station (Yamaguchi) =

Railway station in Shimonoseki, Yamaguchi Prefecture, Japan

Chōfu Station 長府駅
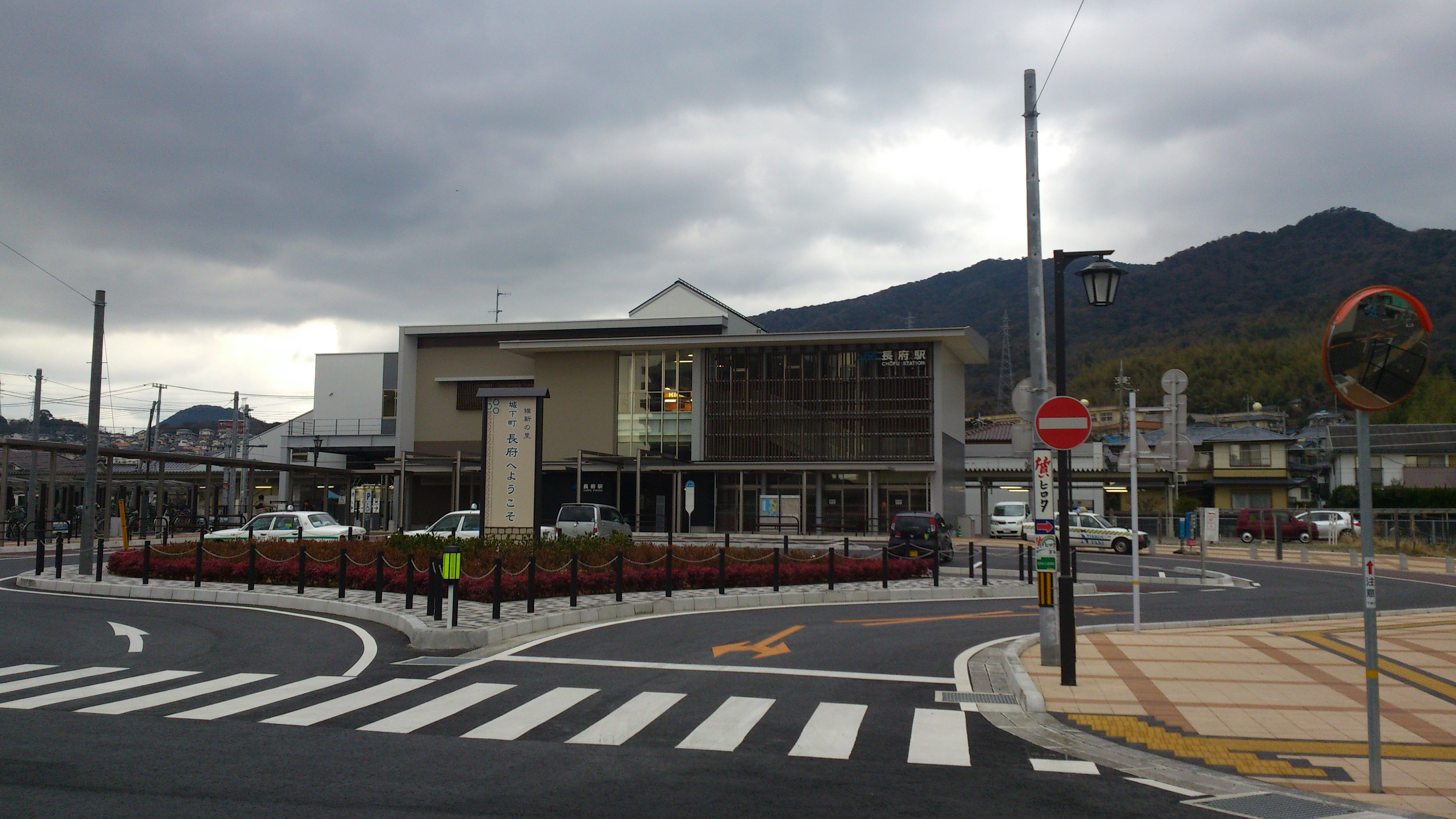
- Chōfu Station in January 2013

General information
- Location: 4-11, Chōfu-Matsuoda-Hommachi, Shimonoseki-shi, Yamaguchi-ken 752-0933; Japan
- Coordinates: 34°1′10.82″N 130°59′59.75″E
- Owner: West Japan Railway Company
- Operator: West Japan Railway Company
- Line: San'yō Line
- Distance: 515.0 km (320.0 miles) from Kobe
- Platforms: 1 island platform
- Tracks: 2
- Connections: Bus stop

Other information
- Status: Staffed
- Website: Official website

History
- Opened: 27 May 1901

Passengers
- FY2020: 1401

Services
Preceding station	JR West	Following station
Shin-Shimonoseki towards Shimonoseki	San'yō Line Local	Ozuki towards Iwakuni
Location
- Location within Yamaguchi Prefecture Location within Japan

Chōfu Station (長府駅, Chōfu-eki) is a passenger railway station located in the city of Shimonoseki, Yamaguchi Prefecture, Japan. It is operated by the West Japan Railway Company (JR West).

== Lines ==
Chōfu Station is served by the JR West San'yō Main Line, and is located 515.0 kilometers from the terminus of the line at Kobe.

== Station layout ==
The station consists of one island platform connected to the station building via a footbridge. The station is staffed.

== Platforms ==
1	■ San'yō Line	for Shimonoseki
3	■ San'yō Line	for Asa and Shin-Yamaguchi

== History ==
Chōfu Station was opened on 27 May 1901 on the San'yō Railway when the line was extended from Asa Station to Bakan Station (present-day Shimonoseki Station) The San'yō Railway was railway nationalized in 1906 and the line renamed the San'yō Main Line in 1909. With the privatization of the Japan National Railway (JNR) on 1 April 1987, the station came under the aegis of the West Japan railway Company (JR West).

== Passenger statistics ==
In fiscal 2020, the station was used by an average of 1401 passengers daily.

== Surrounding area ==
Japan National Route 2 runs parallel to the Sanyo Main Line on the east side of the station The center of the Chofu district and the castle town Chofu are more than 2 kilometers away from this station.

- Shimonoseki Municipal Chofu Elementary School
- Shimonoseki Municipal Chosei Junior High School

== See also ==
- List of railway stations in Japan
