= Ōmijima =

Native name: 青海島
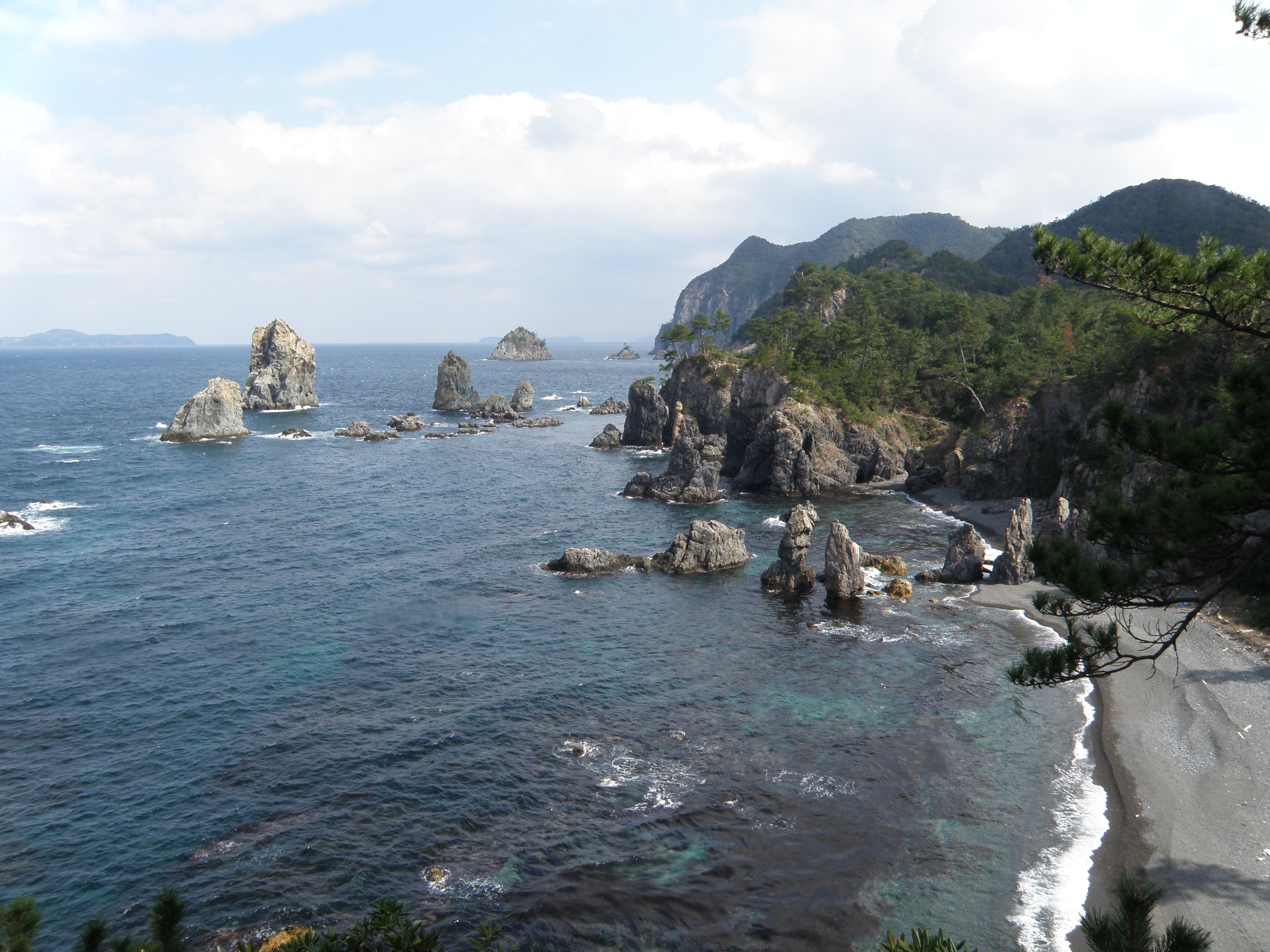
- Ōmijima northern coast

- Location within Yamaguchi Prefecture Location within Japan

Geography
- Location: Sea of Japan
- Coordinates: 34°25′44.2″N 131°13′19.1″E
- Area: 14 km^{2} (5.4 sq mi)
- Coastline: 40 km (25 mi)
- Highest elevation: 319.9 m (1049.5 ft)

Administration
- Japan
- Prefecture: Yamaguchi Prefecture
- City: Nagato

Ōmijima (青海島) is an island located in the Sea of Japan, a part of the city of Nagato, Yamaguchi, Japan. It is situated within the Kita-Nagato Kaigan Quasi-National Park and is renowned for being one of the '100 Best Views in Japan.' The island received its designation as a National Place of Scenic Beauty in 1926.

== Overview ==
The island has an area of 14 square kilometers (14 km^{2}) and a circumference of about 40 kilometers. The highest point on the island is a mountain peak with a height of 319.9 meters on the northeast side. The north coast of the island is eroded by the rough waves of the Sea of Japan, resulting in unique rock formations that are popular destinations for sightseeing boats that depart from Senzaki Port on the mainland. In the southwest of the island lies Lake Oomiko, a lagoon surrounded by sandbanks. The main settlements are the former Senzaki village on the west side of the island and the former Tori village on the east side.

=== Ōmijima Whale Grave ===
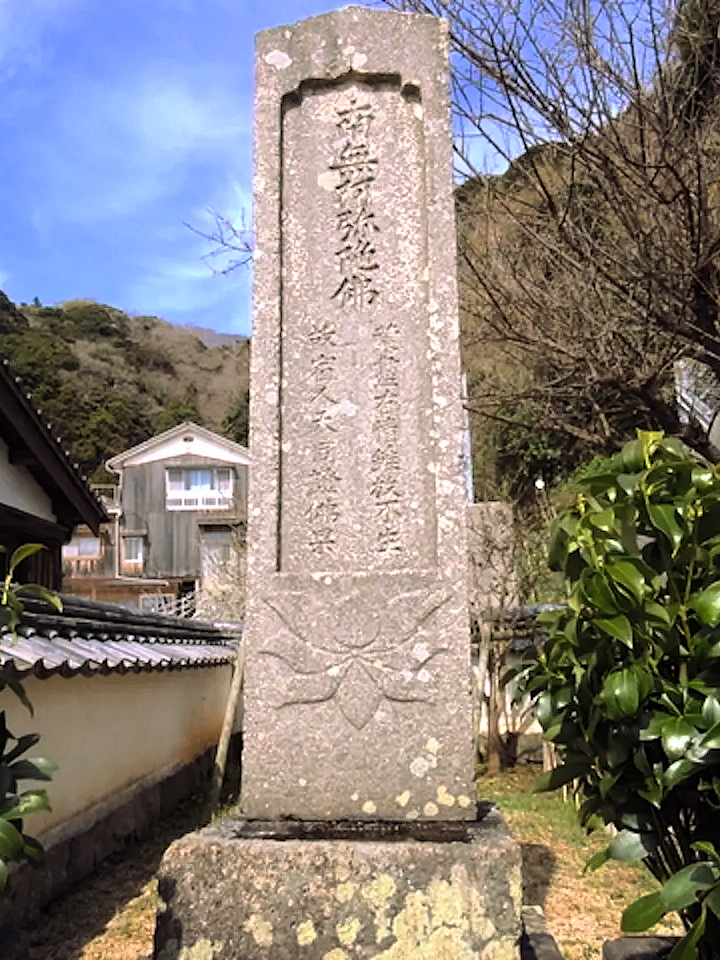
Omijima Whale Grave

Tori village prospered as a base for coastal whaling from the Edo period to the end of the Meiji period, utilizing an ancient whaling practice where whales were driven into the shallow bay and subsequently killed with harpoons by fishermen. The Buddhist temple in the village, Kōgan-ji, houses the Ōmijima Whale Grave (青海島鯨墓, Ōmijima kujira haka), which was constructed in 1692, dedicated especially to the fetuses of unborn whales whose mothers had been slaughtered. This monument, made from granite, stands 2.4 meters high. Whaling has been practiced in Japan since prehistoric times, and whales were an important resource in some coastal communities. In certain areas, stranded whales were identified with the kami Ebisu. With the introduction of Buddhism, mourning and memorial services, whale graves, and various mounds and monuments were constructed, but only a few of these have survived into the modern era. The Ōmijima grave was designated a National Historic Site in 1935.

Visitors can learn more about the state of coastal whaling at that time at the Ōmijima Whaling Museum (くじら博物館) near Kōgan-ji. Additionally, the Hayakawa Family Residence (早川家住宅) the former home of the head of the whalers, is recognized as an Important Cultural Property.

== See also ==
- List of Historic Sites of Japan (Yamaguchi)
- List of Places of Scenic Beauty of Japan (Yamaguchi)
