= List of places of scenic beauty of Japan (Yamaguchi) =

This list is of the places of scenic beauty of Japan located within the Prefecture of Yamaguchi.

== National Places of Scenic Beauty ==
As of 17 December 2021, thirteen Places have been designated at a national level.

Site	Municipality	Comments	Image	Coordinates	Type	Ref.
Kintai-kyō 錦帯橋; Kintai-kyō	Iwakuni			34°09′55″N 132°10′38″E	2	
Mount Kurusan 狗留孫山; Kurusan-zan	Shimonoseki			34°12′53″N 130°58′32″E	10	
Sōrin-ji Gardens 宗隣寺庭園; Sōrinji teien	Ube			33°58′00″N 131°15′08″E	1	
Jōei-ji Gardens 常栄寺庭園; Jōeiji teien	Yamaguchi	also an Historic Site		34°11′54″N 131°29′22″E	1	
Jōtoku-ji Gardens 常徳寺庭園; Jōtokuji teien	Yamaguchi			34°23′10″N 131°34′42″E	1	
Susa Bay 須佐湾; Susa-wan	Hagi	also a Natural Monument		34°37′34″N 131°35′42″E	5, 8	
Oumijima 青海島; Oumijima	Nagato	also a Natural Monument		34°25′29″N 131°12′38″E	5, 8	
Sekichū-kei 石柱渓; Sekichū-kei	Shimonoseki	also a Natural Monument		34°14′58″N 131°09′41″E	5, 6	
Chōmon-kyō 長門峡; Chōmon-kyō	Hagi/Yamaguchi	in Chōmonkyō Prefectural Natural Park		34°21′46″N 131°32′49″E	5	
Tawarajima 俵島; Tawarajima	Nagato	also a Natural Monument		34°23′32″N 130°56′07″E	5, 8	
Mōri Family Gardens 毛利氏庭園; Mōri-shi teien	Hōfu			34°03′46″N 131°35′14″E	1	
Spray from Ryūjin's Palace 龍宮の潮吹; Ryūgū no shiofuki	Nagato	also a Natural Monument		34°25′16″N 131°03′49″E	5, 8	
Tokusa (Cherry Blossoms) 徳佐(サクラ); Tokusa (sakura)	Yamaguchi	flanking the approach to Tokusa Hachiman-gū (徳佐八幡宮)		34°23′47″N 131°43′35″E		

== Prefectural Places of Scenic Beauty ==
As of 1 May 2021, five Places have been designated at a prefectural level.

Site	Municipality	Comments	Image	Coordinates	Type	Ref.
Fugen-ji Gardens 普賢寺庭園; Fugenji teien	Hikari			33°55′19″N 131°58′05″E		
Zenshō-ji Gardens 善生寺庭園; Zenshōji teien	Yamaguchi			34°10′54″N 131°29′14″E		
Shōgan-in Gardens 松巖院庭園; Shōganin teien	Iwakuni			34°07′00″N 132°10′57″E		
Jakuchi-kyō 寂地峡; Jakuchi-kyō	Iwakuni			34°26′07″N 132°03′04″E		
Yasaka-kyō 弥栄峡; Yasaka-kyō	Iwakuni			34°15′42″N 132°08′20″E		

== Municipal Places of Scenic Beauty ==
As of 1 May 2021, a further eleven Places have been designated at a municipal level.

== Registered Places of Scenic Beauty ==
As of 1 December 2021, four Monuments have been registered (as opposed to designated) as Places of Scenic Beauty at a national level.

Site	Municipality	Comments	Image	Coordinates	Type	Ref.
Sansui-en Gardens 山水園庭園; Sansuien teien	Yamaguchi			34°10′42″N 131°28′26″E		
Tokiwa Park 常盤公園; Tokiwa kōen	Ube			33°57′11″N 131°17′05″E		
Matsudaya Hotel Gardens 松田屋ホテル庭園; Matsudaya hoteru teien	Yamaguchi			34°09′55″N 131°27′26″E		
Kanyō-ji Gardens 漢陽寺庭園; Kanyōji teien	Shūnan			34°14′08″N 131°48′55″E		

== See also ==
- Cultural Properties of Japan
- List of Historic Sites of Japan (Yamaguchi)
- List of parks and gardens of Yamaguchi Prefecture
