= Kawaguchi foreign settlement =

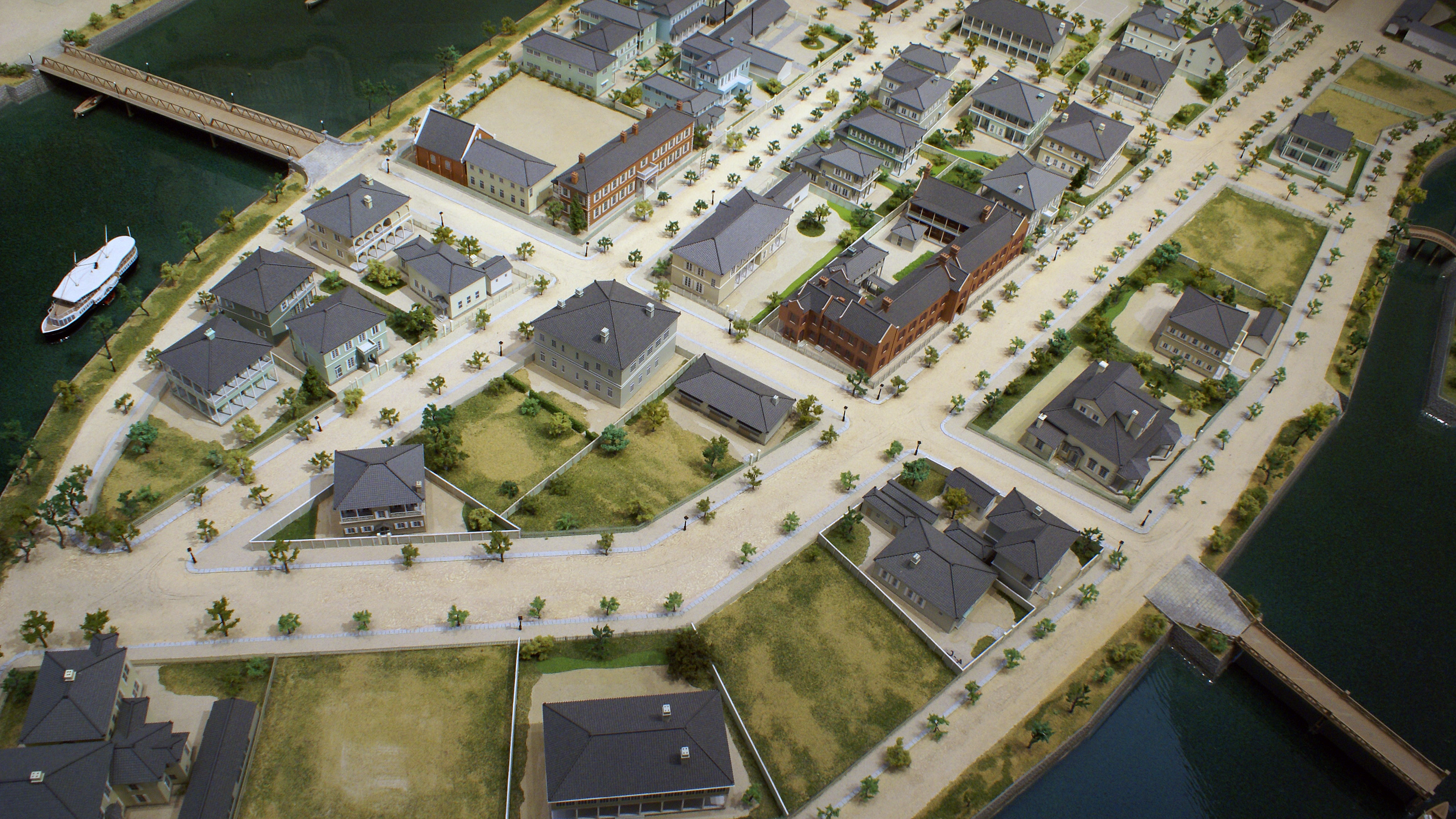
Model of the Kawaguchi foreign settlement in the Osaka Maritime Museum

The Kawaguchi foreign settlement, or known as the Old Kawaguchi settlement (Japanese: 旧川口居留地), was a foreign settlement located in north Kawaguchi, straddling in western present-day Nishi-ku, Osaka as well. It was also called the former Osaka settlement (Japanese: 旧大阪居留地) and the former Osaka-Kawaguchi settlement (Japanese: 旧大阪川口居留地).

The only remnant of the foreign settlement, the Kawaguchi Christ Church Cathedral (川口基督教会), displays the Settlement's vibrant history.

== History ==
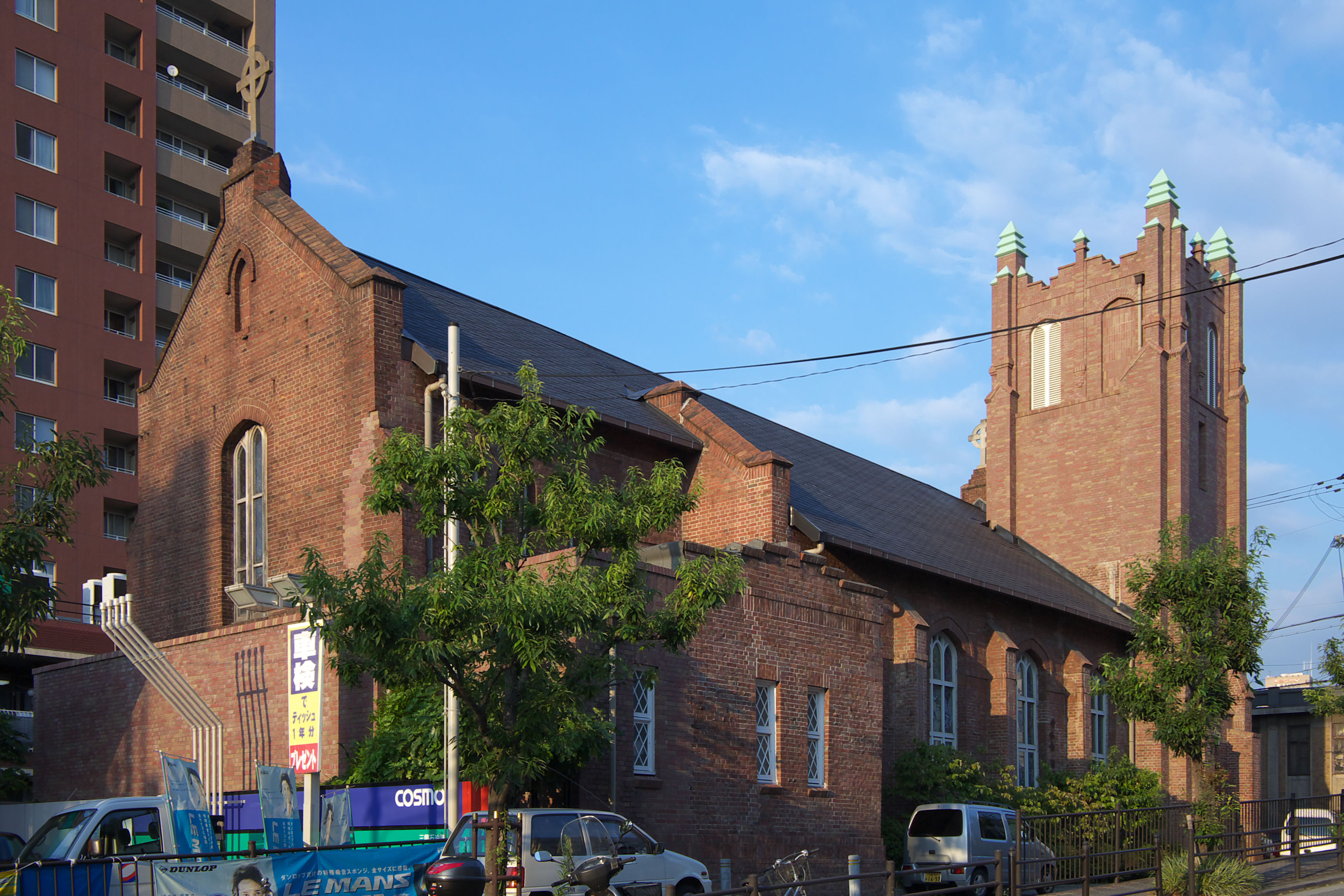
Kawaguchi Church, the only standing building from the Settlement era

The Ansei Treaties of 1858 decided that Osaka would be opened (allowed foreigners to do business) along with Hakodate, Tokyo, Yokohama, Niigata, Kobe, and Nagasaki. The Tokugawa Shogunate wanted to delay the opening of the concessions, but following the shogunate's collapse, and the new Meiji government opened Osaka in January 1868 along with Tokyo, Niigata, and Kobe.

The location of the to-be Osaka-Kawaguchi foreign settlement, located at the junction of the Aji and Kizu rivers, had several kumiyashiki (residence for samurai enrolled in police forces) and a funebansho (ship guard station) handled by the local Osaka dock workers. At the suggestion of gunkan-bugyō (naval commissioner) Katsu Kaishū, these were to torn down in 1864. The dock workers were thus relocated to the Kobe Naval Training Center, also headed by Katsu Kaishu.

On July 15, 1868, Osaka officially opened the now empty lots to Westerners, 26 plots total. Even though it was the smallest of all the foreign settlements at the time (only about 25600 square meters), these lots were immediately auctioned off to eager Western buyers; in the end, out of the 26 wards, 13 went to the British, 4 went to the Germans and Americans, 2 for the French and Dutch, and 1 for the Belgians. However, the initial excitement died down as the buyers realized there was poor port development. The land itself was far from the Osaka Bay and much more inland, meaning large cargo ships cannot maneuver to the settlement. In addition, Osaka's struggling economy at the time paled in comparison to the other cities who opened up lots for settlement.

Although many of the buyers eventually moved on to Kobe, many (especially missionaries) settled down in the lots and began constructing a Western-style settlement. According to literature at the time, eucalyptus and rubber trees were planted on the sides of the wide paved streets, English-style cottage homes and Spanish-style stone and brick buildings were built. In the night, the settlement was bright as gas lamps were turned on. In the multi-tenant areas, there was a butcherhouse, milk, bread, and ramune stores to meet the foreigners' demands. Clothes stores, dry cleaners and barbershops were also constructed. It was in the foreign settlement that Osaka's first telecommunications station, Western restaurant, Chinese restaurant, and café was built as well.

The bordering neighborhoods of Tomijima 富島町, Furukawa 古川町, Umemoto 梅本町, and some others were subsumed into the settlement. As the settlement slowly regrew in popularity, an additional 10 lots were added in 1886. On Enokojima Island, facing east of the settlement, the Osaka Prefectural Government Building and Osaka City Hall (both built in Western styles) were complete in 1974 and 1899, respectively. Even after the abolishment of the foreign settlement in 1899, the settlement had become close in proximity to the bustling commercial center of Osaka, causing its economy to boom.

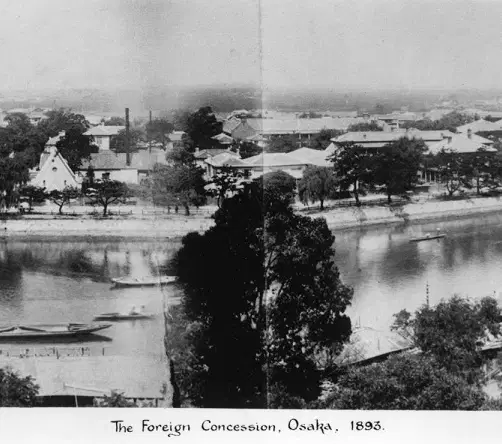
The Kawaguchi Foreign Concession in Osaka, 1893

=== Kawaguchi missionaries ===
Due to many of the foreign businessmen and traders moving on to other settlements like the Kobe foreign settlement, missionaries from various Christian denominations came to fill the vacuum, and as a result, the settlement became a nucleus of Christian evangelism. The Meiji government explained that even though the ban on Christianity is not abolished, the freedom of evangelical activities were permitted in the foreign settlement. These missionaries, initially denied settlement during the auctions of 1868, rebuilt empty lots left behind with churches, hospitals, orphanages, and more. In 1884, out of the 26 original plots, 20 became Christian facilities and residences for missionaries. Notable buildings founded by Christian missionaries were the St. Agnes School, Poole Girls' School, Osaka Jogakuin Jr. and Sr. High School, St. Andrew's University, Rikkyo School, Osaka Shinai General School, and St. Barnabas Hospital. It was under the pressure of these missionaries that the Meiji government acquiesced to open up ten additional plots.

=== Kawaguchi businesses & trading companies ===
Due to the relative inaccessibility of the foreign settlement from shipments from Western countries, when compared to the residential and educational parts of the settlements, the commercial portions were minimal. Most businesses in the Kawaguchi foreign settlement had other branches based in Japanese cities like Kobe and Nagasaki, and many of them closed down their branches in Kawaguchi, where schools and residential areas took their place instead. The only company office that remained until the dissolution of the settlement in 1899 was the C&J Favre-Brandt, which specialized in pocket watches and industrial machinery; it is said to have sold weapons to the Meiji government during the Satsuma Rebellion. In the beginning of the settlement, other businesses included The Hongkong and Shanghai Banking Corporation, O.S.K. Lines, Ltd., the Karol Company (specialized in icemaking), etc.

== Legacy ==
Following the abolishment of the settlement in 1899, the 36 plots of land were transferred to Osaka and became the Kawaguchi district. At this time, many Chinese immigrants (most from the Shandong province) began moving into the tenant areas of the former settlement, and the area became a Chinatown. In the early Showa period, the number exceeded 3,000, and they were engaged in businesses such as clothing stores, hairdressers, trading, and more. However, due to the intensification of the Sino-Japanese War and the bombing of Osaka, many Chinese businessmen dispersed throughout Japan or left to return to China.

After World War II, as the Chinese left the settlement, Kawaguchi became a warehouse district, where companies like Mitsui-Soko Holdings Co. and Sumitomo Co. built concrete buildings. Most of the buildings from the settlement area were dismantled. A stone monument commemorating the Kawaguchi Settlement stands in the corner of an elementary school.
