= Zanuti =

Swiss watchmaker

ZANUTI INC.
- Type: Private
- Industry: Mechanical watchmaking
- Predecessor: Zanuti & Cie.
- Founded: 1887; 139 years ago
- Founder: Albert Favre Zanuti
- Headquarters: Geneva, Switzerland
- Area served: Worldwide
- Products: Wristwatches
- Website: zanuti.com

ZANUTI INC. is a mechanical watch manufacturer established in 1887 by Albert Favre Zanuti, currently headquartered in Switzerland and with regional offices in the United States and Japan.

The company was involved in the early development of the watchmaking industry in Japan, while being funded by a governmental program (O-yatoi Gaikokujin) promoting industrial and cultural reforms.

== Background ==
Zanuti was founded in 1887 as a result of three major events that took place in Japan during the second half of the 19th century.

The first event was the establishment of the commercial treaty between Switzerland and Japan during a Swiss diplomatic mission to Asia in 1864, after more than 200 years of Japanese self-imposed isolation from international trade.

This agreement, signed in Japan by Swiss diplomat Aime Humbert-Droz, was paramount in the long-term development of a strong relationship between the two nations, leading thousands of Swiss entrepreneurs and other professionals to travel to Japan to initiate trade and cultural exchanges.

The second major event was the arrival of the industrial revolution in Japan in 1870. As previously experienced by the western nations in Europe and the United States, the industrial revolution in Japan triggered a period of incredible prosperity and an economic growth rate unlike any other in Japanese history. This period gave birth to the rapid development of its industries, while laying the foundation for the establishment of most industrial conglomerates in Japan still in business today.

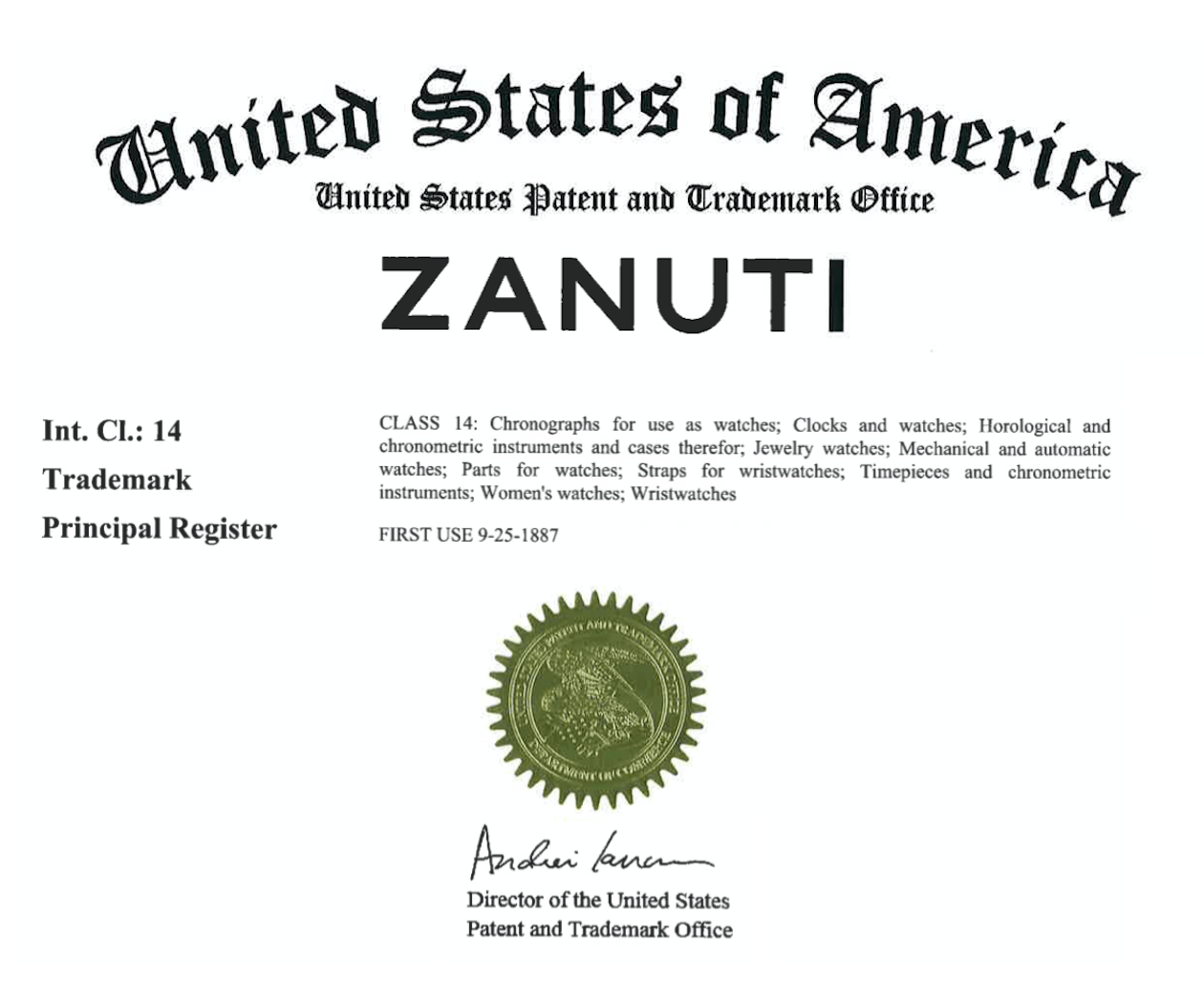
Summary of the official Zanuti trademark certificate issued by the US Patent and Trademark Office

The third and final event was the creation of a Japanese national program backing foreign investment in the nation, as well as the recruitment of European and American professionals to import western technology and know-how into Japanese municipalities and companies (O-yatoi Gaikokujin). This program directly employed thousands of foreign nationals (mainly engineers, economists and academics) who would travel to Japan to apply their expertise to local companies and public institutions, in exchange for great salaries and incentives.

== Early history ==
In the early 1880s, Albert Favre Zanuti established himself as one of the main suppliers of pocket watches to brands such as C&J Favre Brandt (founded by his business partner James Favre Brandt) and Siber & Brennwald (established by his acquaintance Kaspar Brennwald, whom he had worked with during the early days of Union Horlogère Suisse in La Chaux-de-Fonds).

As a consequence of the trade agreement between Switzerland and Japan in 1864, both companies were now established in Yokohama, Japan, relying on their Swiss-based partners to guarantee supply not just of watches but also spare parts and machinery.

These initial exports of Swiss watches to Japan were critical in establishing the Japanese watchmaking industry and the birth of the first generation of Japanese watchmakers. Amongst them were Seijiro Sakurai and Kintarō Hattori, who began their careers buying Swiss watches from the western trading companies in Yokohama and re-selling them to local Japanese customers. Hattori would go on to establish the globally renowned brand Seiko, one of the world's biggest watch manufacturers to date.

Through the invitation of Viscount Aoki Shūzō, and supported by his long time business partner Brandt, Zanuti received a diplomatic invitation to take part in Japan's governmental plan for 'transfers of technology and cultural ways', joining the so-called O-yatoi Gaikokujin.

Facing few business competitors, Zanuti incorporated Zanuti & Cie. in 1887, along with dozens of other Japanese trading houses established in the same year, some of which are now amongst the largest holding companies in the world, including Yamaha, Nissan Chemical, Mitsubishi Logistics, Nippon Oil, Fujimitsu, KAO Cosmetics and Tokyo Insurance.

== Company restructuring ==
From 1900 to 1910, the Japanese governmental program for the O-yatoi Gaikokujin was discontinued, leading to profound restructures in most foreign owned businesses in Japan.

This policy was a response to the growing power of western companies and their monopoly of trade in several major ports of Japan, in particular Yokohama, where Zanuti and most Swiss companies were based.

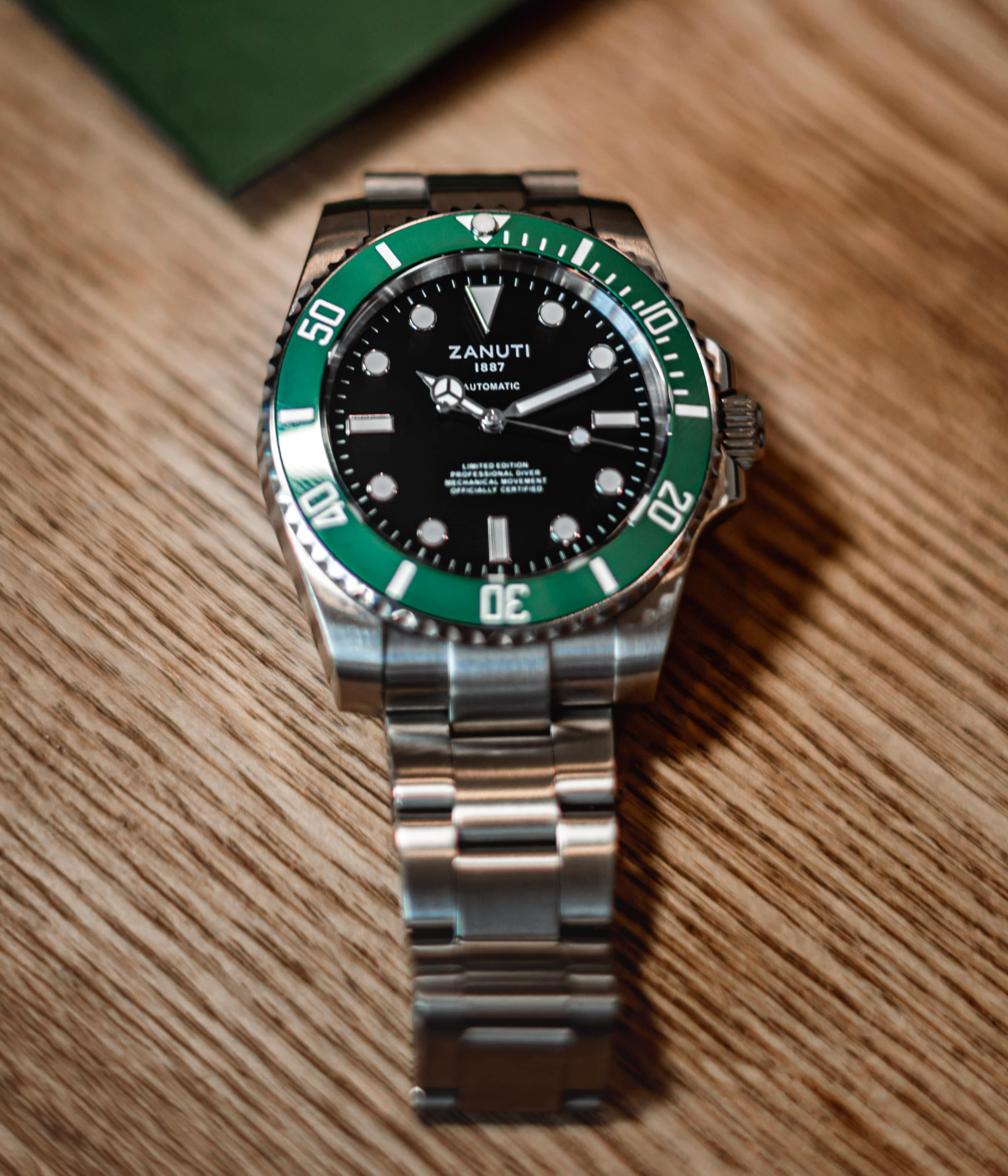
A mechanical watch by Zanuti

Masuda Takashi, one of the leading Japanese industrialists and investors of that era, was amongst the opponents of a growing western control over the Port of Yokohama, attempting multiple times to acquire the European Trading firms left in a dire situation after the cancelation of the O-yatoi Gaikokujin program.

Zanuti eventually retired in 1911, and sold the rights to his business and trading operations to Japanese trading firm Mitsui Trading Company, led by Masuda Takashi (a firm still operating today as one of the largest Japanese conglomerate groups Mitsui & Co.).

Over the course of the next several decades, the company continued to provide watchmaking services within the Japanese market, as both retailer and service center to several high-end Swiss brands.

== Recent developments ==
From 1995 to 2005, Zanuti's retail business suffered strong financial difficulties, particularly in the beginning of the 21st century when it faced thousands of new competitors worldwide in the form of digital stores and online marketplaces. This wave of digital sellers dramatically increased market supply, crushing profit margins for the traditional 'brick and mortar' retailers, which had to bear high fixed costs in real estate leases and sales staff.

The revenue from watchmaking services was also strongly impacted as most Swiss brands brought their after-sales services in-house, dropping retailers and agents in favor of their own service centers. This combination ultimately dictated the collapse of an already struggling retail business, leading the company to seek alternative business models to stay relevant in its watchmaking segment.

In 2006, the company started manufacturing its own mechanical watches, selling them in retail stores across Europe and Japan, and ultimately shipping worldwide from 2017.

== Criticism and controversies ==
Despite being established since 1887, Zanuti never designed or manufactured its own in-house mechanical caliber, instead relying on third-party companies to supply the individual mechanical components.

Over the years, Zanuti has relied on multiple different suppliers, including Swiss manufacturers ETA SA and Ronda, as well as Japanese partners Citizen Miyota and Seiko, to provide essential components for their watches, something that is considered a faux-pax amongst more established brands. According to the company website, several Chinese movements have also been used as the basis for customization by Zanuti and tested to ISO chronometer standard, although Zanuti have not publicly disclosed actual details of such tests.

Also controversial is the fact that the company still claims to remain independent, although the majority of its copyrights worldwide have been updated in recent years, with a new European-based ownership and representation.

== See also ==
- Meiji period
- François Perregaux
- Foreign relations of Japan

== Books ==
- The first Swiss watchmakers in Asia, chapter by François Chaille, Girard-Perregaux, Editions Flammarion, 2004, ISBN 2080110691
- Japanese Trading Companies, Shinichi Yonekawa, United Nations Univ 1991, ISBN 9280805320 ISBN 978-9280805321
- Swiss Imports from Yokohama and Japanese Watch Manufacturers: The Market for Watches in Meiji Era Japan, 1869 – 1912, by Pierre-Yves Donzé
- Documenting the European Society in Yokohama from 1871 to 1908, Japan weekly mail (OCoLC) 882879033
- Mitsui Trading Co: Expansion Overseas in the Meiji Era, by Minoru Kiyama, ISBN 4623053725 ISBN 978-4623053728
- Turning Points in Japanese History, the Meiji Era, Pag. 71–102, edited by Bert Edstrom, 2002
- The Meiji Restoration (1868–1912), Michael R. Auslin, ISBN 9780674022270
- Le Japon et l'industrie horlogère suisse. Un cas de transfert de technologie durant les années 1880– 1940, by Pierre-Yves Donzé
- Japanese Multinational Enterprise before 1914, Cambridge University Press (1986) by Mira Wilkins
- Notable Oyatoi gaikokujin, Akashi Shoten (Tōkyō), ISBN 9784750331508, ISBN 4750331503
- The Meiji government and foreign employees during 1868–1900, PhD. dissertation – University of Michigan, by H. J. Jones (1967) (OCLC 23243688)
- Mario M. Einaudi, and Jennifer Allan Goldman. "The Pacific Mail Steamship Company Collection." Southern California Quarterly 94, no. 4: 407–09
- Library of Congress, Yokohama publications on its European Society from 1870 to 1915 Serial number: (OCoLC) ca06001290
- Technology and the Culture of Progress in Meiji Japan, by David G. Wittner ISBN 0415433754 ISBN 9780415433754
