= Nagato, Yamaguchi =

Nagato 長門市
- City
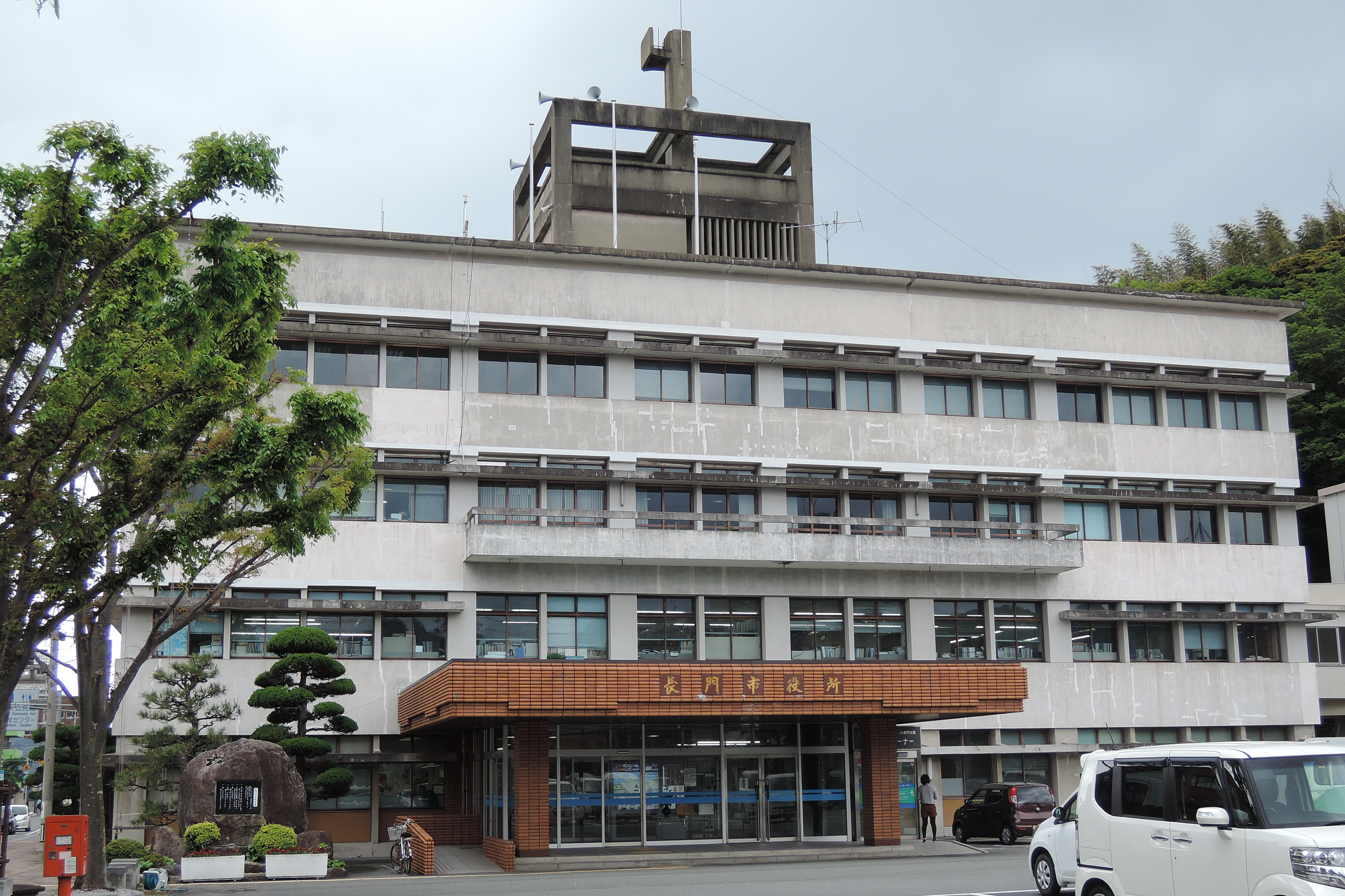
- Nagato city hall

- Flag Emblem
- Location of Nagato in Yamaguchi Prefecture

- Location in Japan
- Coordinates: 34°22′14″N 131°10′57″E
- Country: Japan
- Region: Chūgoku (San'yō)
- Prefecture: Yamaguchi

Government
  - Mayor: Tatsuya Ehara

Area
  - Total: 357.31 km^{2} (137.96 sq mi)

Population (February 28, 2023)
  - Total: 31,518
  - Density: 88.209/km^{2} (228.46/sq mi)
- Time zone: UTC+09:00 (JST)
- City hall address: 1339–2 Higashifukagawa, Nagato-shi, Yamaguchi-ken 759-4192
- Climate: Cfa
- Website: Official website
- Symbols
- Flower: Sakura and Azalea
- Insect: Firefly
- Tree: Sakura and Azalea

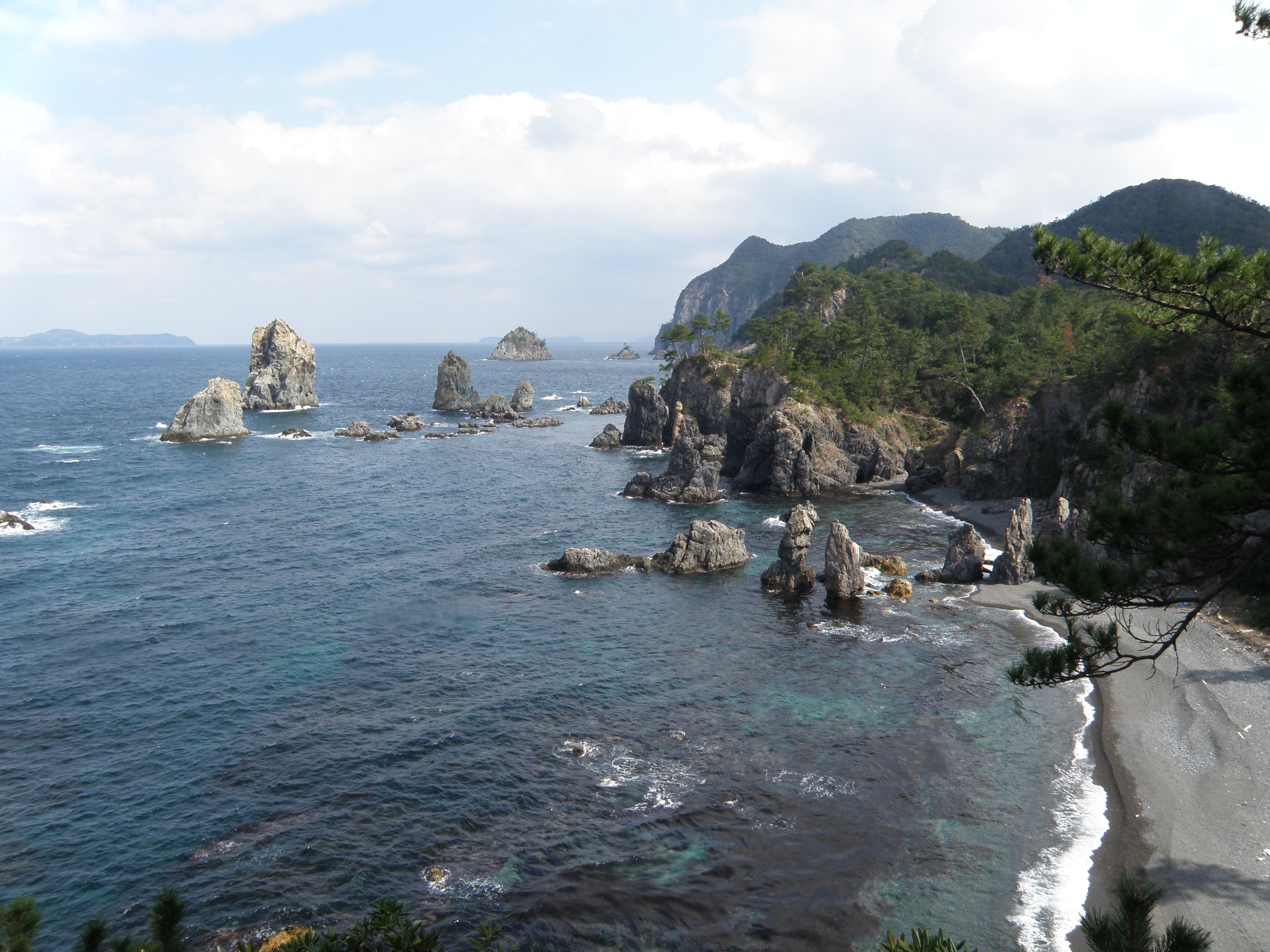
Ōmijima coast

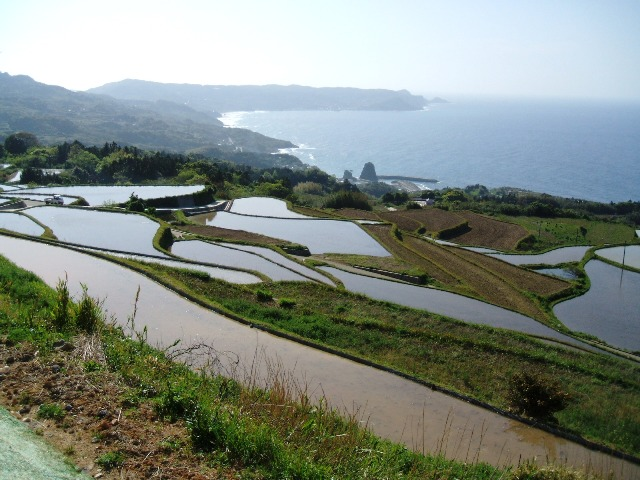
Rice terraces in Yuya

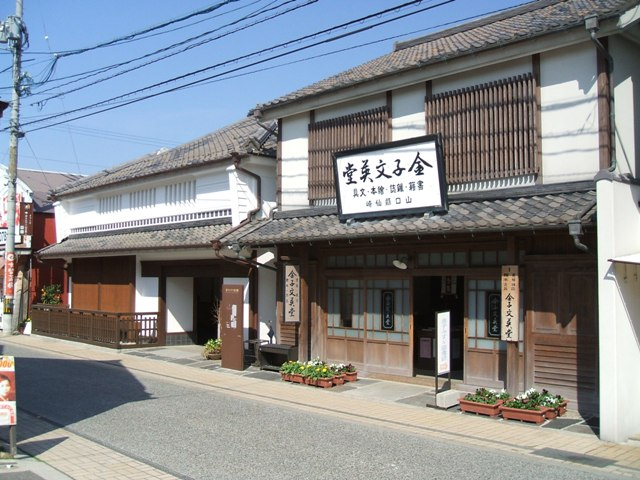
Misuzu Kaneko Memorial Museum

Nagato (長門市, Nagato-shi; Japanese pronunciation: [nä́.ɡä̀.tò̞, -ŋä̀.tò̞, nä̀.ɡä́.tó̞(.ɕì), -ŋä́.tó̞(.ɕì)]) is a city in Yamaguchi Prefecture, Japan. As of 28 February 2023, the city had an estimated population of 31,518 in 15537 households and a population density of 88 persons per km². The total area of the city is 357.31 square kilometres (137.96 sq mi).

== Geography ==
Nagato is located in northwestern Yamaguchi. The north side faces the Sea of Japan, and the coastline facing the open sea is eroded terrain. On the other hand, there are coves such as Fukagawa Bay and Senzaki Bay, which are surrounded by the island of Ōmijima and the mainland, and Aburaya Bay, which is surrounded by the Mukatsugu Peninsula, which are good natural harbors. Since the Mukatsugu Peninsula has little flat land, there are many terraced rice fields. The southern part of the city is on the western edge of the Chūgoku Mountains, and snow can be seen in the mountainous areas. However, due to the influence of the Tsushima Current, it does not get extremely cold even in winter, and because the altitude is not so high, the number of snowy days is not so many. Nagato also encompasses Ōmijima Island in the Sea of Japan, which is connected by a large road bridge which connects the Senzaki Peninsula with the southern edge of the island. Much of the island is within the borders of the Kita-Nagato Kaigan Quasi-National Park.

== Neighboring municipalities ==
Yamaguchi Prefecture

- Hagi
- Mine
- Shimonoseki

=== Climate ===
Nagato has a humid subtropical climate (Köppen climate classification Cfa) with hot summers and cool winters. Precipitation is significant throughout the year, but is much higher in summer than in winter. The average annual temperature in Nagato is 15.9 °C (60.6 °F). The average annual rainfall is 1,790.8 mm (70.50 in) with July as the wettest month. The temperatures are highest on average in August, at around 27.1 °C (80.8 °F), and lowest in January, at around 5.8 °C (42.4 °F). The highest temperature ever recorded in Nagato was 36.7 °C (98.1 °F) on 14 August 2018; the coldest temperature ever recorded was −6.1 °C (21.0 °F) on 26 February 1981.

Climate data for Yuya, Nagato (1991−2020 normals, extremes 1977−present)
Month	Jan	Feb	Mar	Apr	May	Jun	Jul	Aug	Sep	Oct	Nov	Dec	Year
Record high °C (°F)	18.6 (65.5)	23.2 (73.8)	25.5 (77.9)	29.5 (85.1)	30.7 (87.3)	33.4 (92.1)	35.7 (96.3)	36.7 (98.1)	35.2 (95.4)	31.9 (89.4)	27.0 (80.6)	23.9 (75.0)	36.7 (98.1)
Mean daily maximum °C (°F)	9.5 (49.1)	10.5 (50.9)	13.8 (56.8)	18.7 (65.7)	23.2 (73.8)	26.0 (78.8)	29.9 (85.8)	31.3 (88.3)	27.4 (81.3)	22.6 (72.7)	17.4 (63.3)	12.0 (53.6)	20.2 (68.3)
Daily mean °C (°F)	5.8 (42.4)	6.4 (43.5)	9.3 (48.7)	13.9 (57.0)	18.4 (65.1)	21.9 (71.4)	26.1 (79.0)	27.1 (80.8)	23.1 (73.6)	17.8 (64.0)	12.8 (55.0)	8.0 (46.4)	15.9 (60.6)
Mean daily minimum °C (°F)	1.8 (35.2)	2.0 (35.6)	4.4 (39.9)	8.7 (47.7)	13.6 (56.5)	18.3 (64.9)	22.9 (73.2)	23.7 (74.7)	19.5 (67.1)	13.2 (55.8)	8.1 (46.6)	3.8 (38.8)	11.7 (53.0)
Record low °C (°F)	−5.2 (22.6)	−6.1 (21.0)	−3.6 (25.5)	−1.1 (30.0)	3.1 (37.6)	7.9 (46.2)	13.7 (56.7)	15.9 (60.6)	7.0 (44.6)	2.8 (37.0)	−0.4 (31.3)	−3.5 (25.7)	−6.1 (21.0)
Average precipitation mm (inches)	97.8 (3.85)	86.8 (3.42)	137.7 (5.42)	130.4 (5.13)	146.2 (5.76)	222.5 (8.76)	279.7 (11.01)	198.3 (7.81)	202.0 (7.95)	106.5 (4.19)	99.4 (3.91)	83.5 (3.29)	1,790.8 (70.50)
Average precipitation days (≥ 1.0 mm)	11.3	10.6	11.4	10.2	9.2	11.5	11.4	9.0	10.7	8.0	10.0	10.4	123.7
Mean monthly sunshine hours	83.5	101.0	151.2	182.0	204.1	137.3	164.1	197.4	143.5	156.9	116.6	86.3	1,723.8
Source: Japan Meteorological Agency

=== Demographics ===
Per Japanese census data, the population of Nagato in 2020 is 32,519 people. Nagato has been conducting censuses since 1920.

Historical population
Year	Pop.	±%
1920	49,511	—
1925	50,249	+1.5%
1930	50,855	+1.2%
1935	50,753	−0.2%
1940	50,776	+0.0%
1945	64,030	+26.1%
1950	64,281	+0.4%
1955	66,112	+2.8%
1960	62,866	−4.9%
1965	57,669	−8.3%
1970	53,247	−7.7%
1975	51,421	−3.4%
1980	50,892	−1.0%
1985	50,259	−1.2%
1990	47,656	−5.2%
1995	45,565	−4.4%
2000	43,473	−4.6%
2005	41,127	−5.4%
2010	38,317	−6.8%
2015	35,439	−7.5%
2020	32,519	−8.2%
Nagato population statistics

== History ==
The area of Nagato was part of ancient Nagato Province. During the Edo Period, the area was part of the holdings of Chōshū domain. After the Meiji restoration, the area was divided into eight villages within Ōtsu District, Yamaguchi with the creation of the modern municipalities system. Senzaki was raised to town status on April 15, 1914, followed by Fukagawa on November 1, 1928. The city of Nagato was established on March 31, 1954 by the merger of Fukawa and Senzaki, with the villages of Kayoi and Tawarayama. On March 22, 2005 the city annexed the villages of Yuya, Heki and Misumi with the district of Ōtsu dissolved by this merger.

== Government ==
Nagato has a mayor-council form of government with a directly elected mayor and a unicameral city council of 18 members. Nagato contributes one member to the Yamaguchi Prefectural Assembly. In terms of national politics, the city is part of the Yamaguchi 3rd district of the lower house of the Diet of Japan. Between 1993 and 2022, Nagato was represented by former Japanese Prime Minister Shinzo Abe in the lower house of the diet.

In the 2017 Japanese general election, 76.25% of Nagato's proportional ballots were cast for either one of the two parties in the conservative ruling coalition (the Liberal Democratic Party and Komeito) or one of the two minor LDP-allied conservative parties (Party for Japanese Kokoro) and New Party Daichi), making it the most conservative city in the country for that election under this definition, and the second most conservative municipality overall behind Himeshima, Ōita.

== Economy ==
The main industries in Nagato are commercial fishing, agriculture, animal husbandry and food processing. Fujimitsu Corporation, a manufacturer of fish surimi products, is headquartered in the city. The tourism industry is also a major component of the local economy.

== Education ==
Nagato has 12 public elementary school and five public junior high schools operated by the city government, and one public high school operated by the Yamaguchi Prefectural Board of Education. There are also one private high school.

== Transportation ==
=== Railway ===
JR West (JR West) – San'in Main Line

- Nagato-Misumi – Nagatoshi – Kiwado – Nagato-Furuichi – Hitomaru – Igami

JR West (JR West) – San'in Main Line (branch line)

- Nagatoshi – Senzaki

JR West (JR West) – Mine Line

- Shibuki – Nagato-Yumoto – Itamochi – Nagatoshi

=== Highways ===
- San'in Expressway
- National Route 191
- National Route 316
- National Route 491

== Noted people from Nagato ==
- Kan Abe, politician
- Misuzu Kaneko, poet
- Iccho Itoh, former mayor of Nagasaki
