= Jōei-ji =

Buddhist temple in Yamaguchi, Japan

- 常栄寺
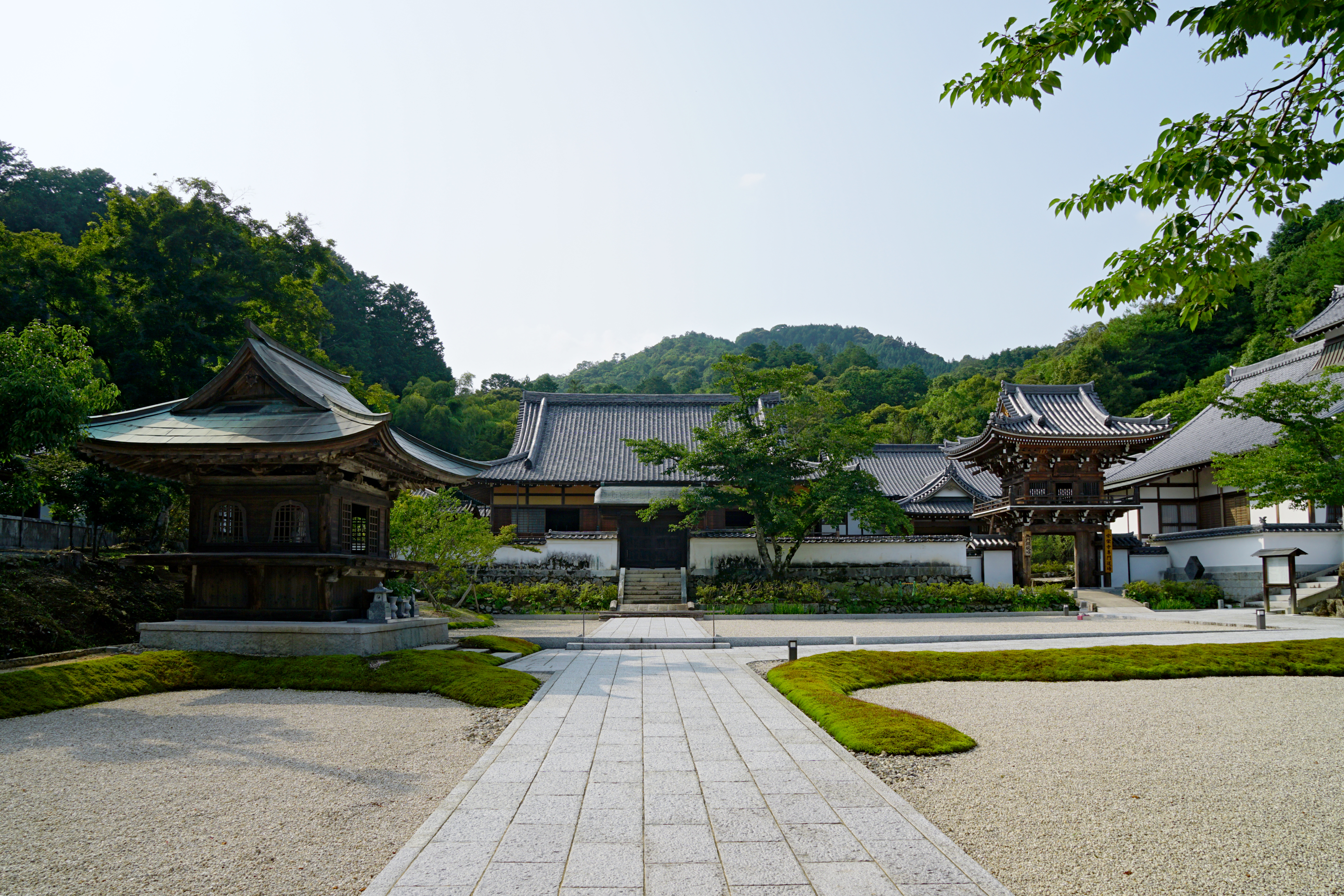
- Jōei-ji

- Location within Yamaguchi Prefecture Location within Japan

Religion
- Affiliation: Buddhist
- Deity: Senju Kannon Bosatsu
- Rite: Rinzai school
- Status: functional

Location
- Location: 2001 Miyanoshita, Yamaguchi-shi, Yamaguchi-ken 753-0011
- Country: Japan
- Coordinates: 34°11′52.86″N 131°29′23.52″E

Website
- Official website
- National Place of Scenic Beauty National Historic Site of Japan

Jōei-ji (常栄寺) is a Buddhist temple located in the Miyanoshita neighborhood of the city of Yamaguchi, Yamaguchi Prefecture, in the San'yō region of Japan. The temple belongs to the Tofuku-ji branch of the Rinzai school of Japanese Zen and its honzon is a statue of Senju Kannon Bosatsu. The temple is also commonly called "Sesshu-ji", as it is famous for its garden, which is attributed to Sesshū Tōyō, which has been designated as a both a National Historic Site and a National Place of Scenic Beauty in 1926.

== History ==
In 1563, Mōri Motonari built the temple of Jōei-ji in what is now part of the city of Akitakata, Hiroshima to pray for the soul of his son, Mōri Takamoto, who had died suddenly while leading the Mōri armies on a campaign through Bingo Province. The temple was granted official recognition by Emperor Ogimachi. However, in 1600, the Mōri were defeated at the Battle of Sekigahara and most of their territory (including Aki Province) was seized by the victorious Tokugawa shogunate. Jōei-ji was relocated to Chōshū Domain and was given the site of Kokusei-ji (国清寺), the bodaiji of Ōuchi Moriakira, the former rulers of Suō Province. However, when Chōshū Domain relocated its seat from Hagi Castle to Yamaguchi Castle in 1863, the bodaiji of the Mōri clan, Toshun-ji in Hagi, was relocated to the site of Jōei-ji, and Jōei-ji was relocated to the site of Myōki-ji (妙喜寺). This temple had originally been a villa owned by Ōuchi Masahiro, which had been converted into the temple of Myōki-ji (妙喜寺). During his lifetime, Sesshū Tōyō constructed the garden on what is now the north side of the temple grounds. The temple had been given to the widow of Mōri Takamoto, and was renamed Myōjū-ji (妙寿寺), becoming Choon-ji (潮音寺) in 1863 and finally Jōei-ji in 1888. During all of these changes in name, the garden continued to be maintained as it was constructed by Sesshū. It is strolling garden built in a small valley surrounded by forests on three sides except the south side facing the temple, with a pond in front and a dry waterfall in the northeast. In addition, the technique of erecting standing stones is also unique, and the appearance of the garden in the Muromachi period remains today.

The temple is located approximately 15 minutes on foot from Miyano Station or ten minutes by car from Yamaguchi Station on the JR West Yamaguchi Line.

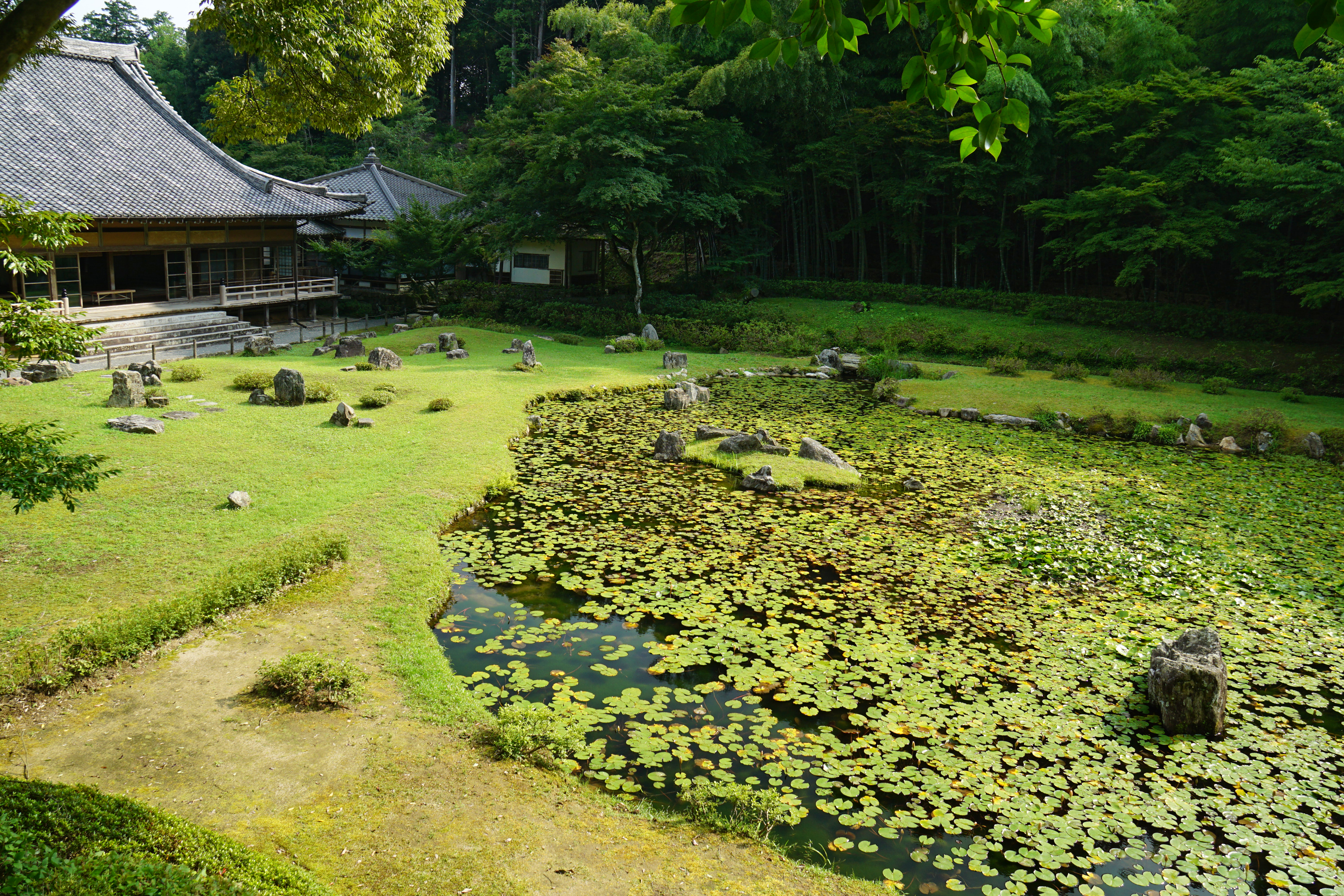
Hondo and pond

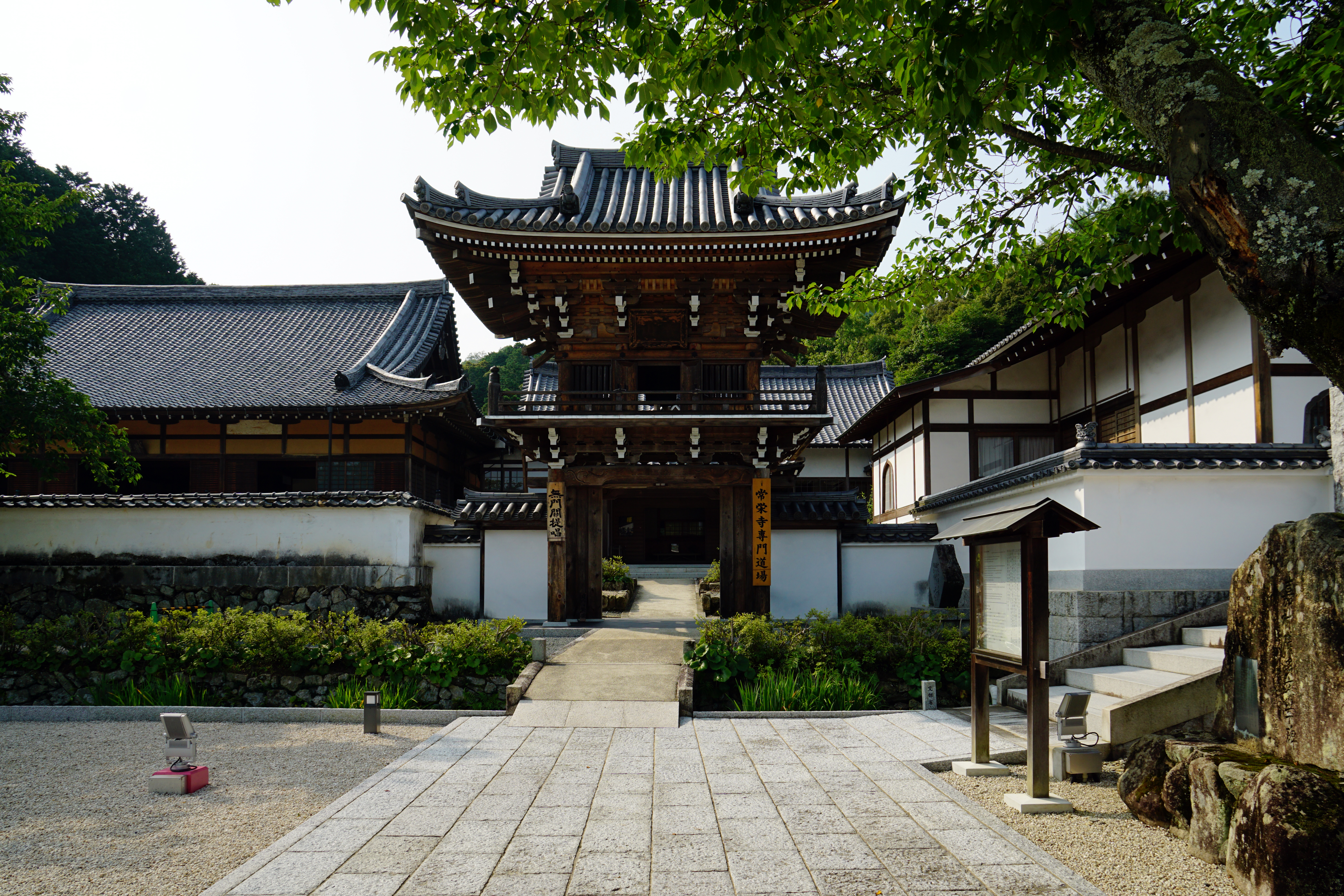
Shoromon

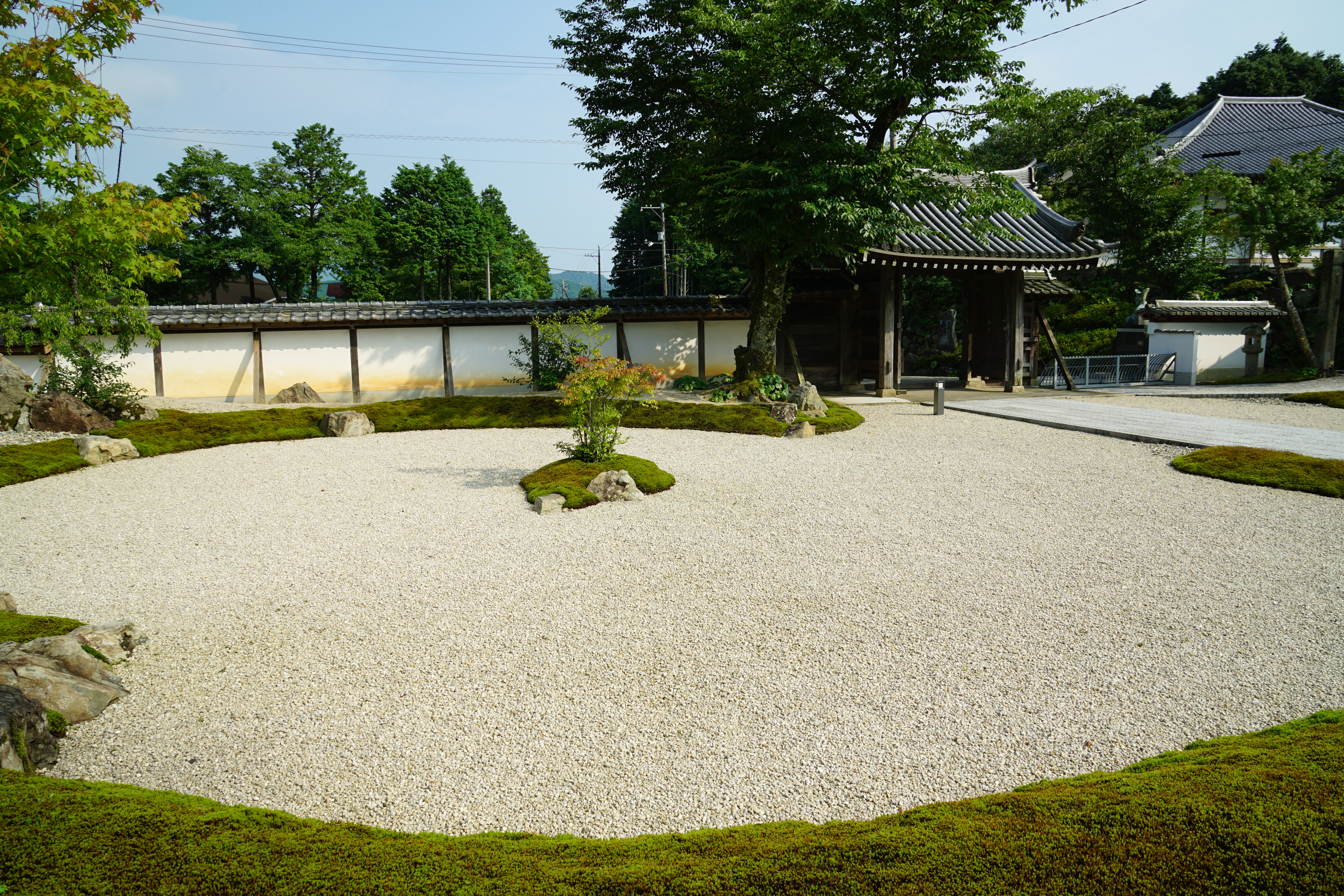
Front Garden

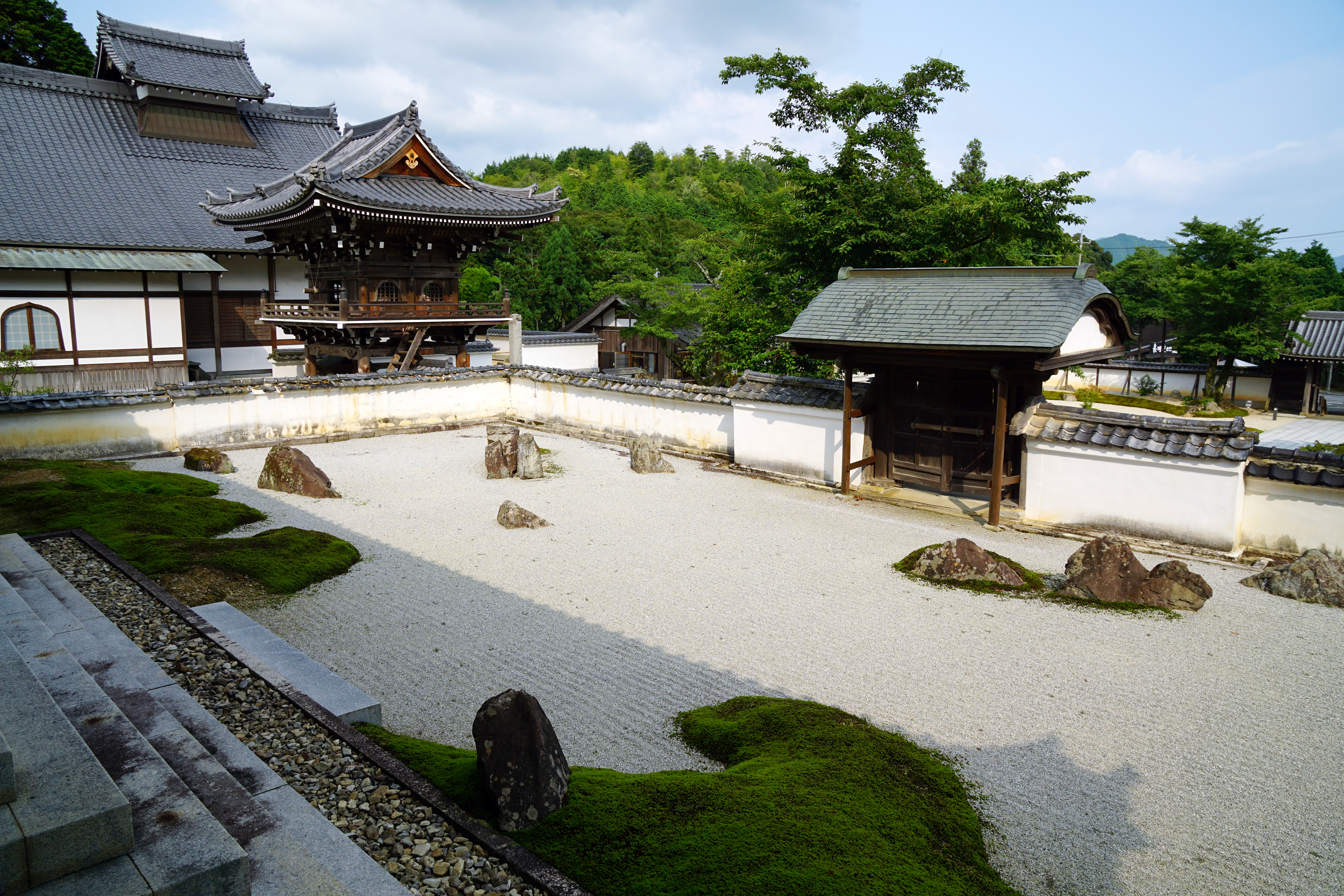
Dry landscape garden

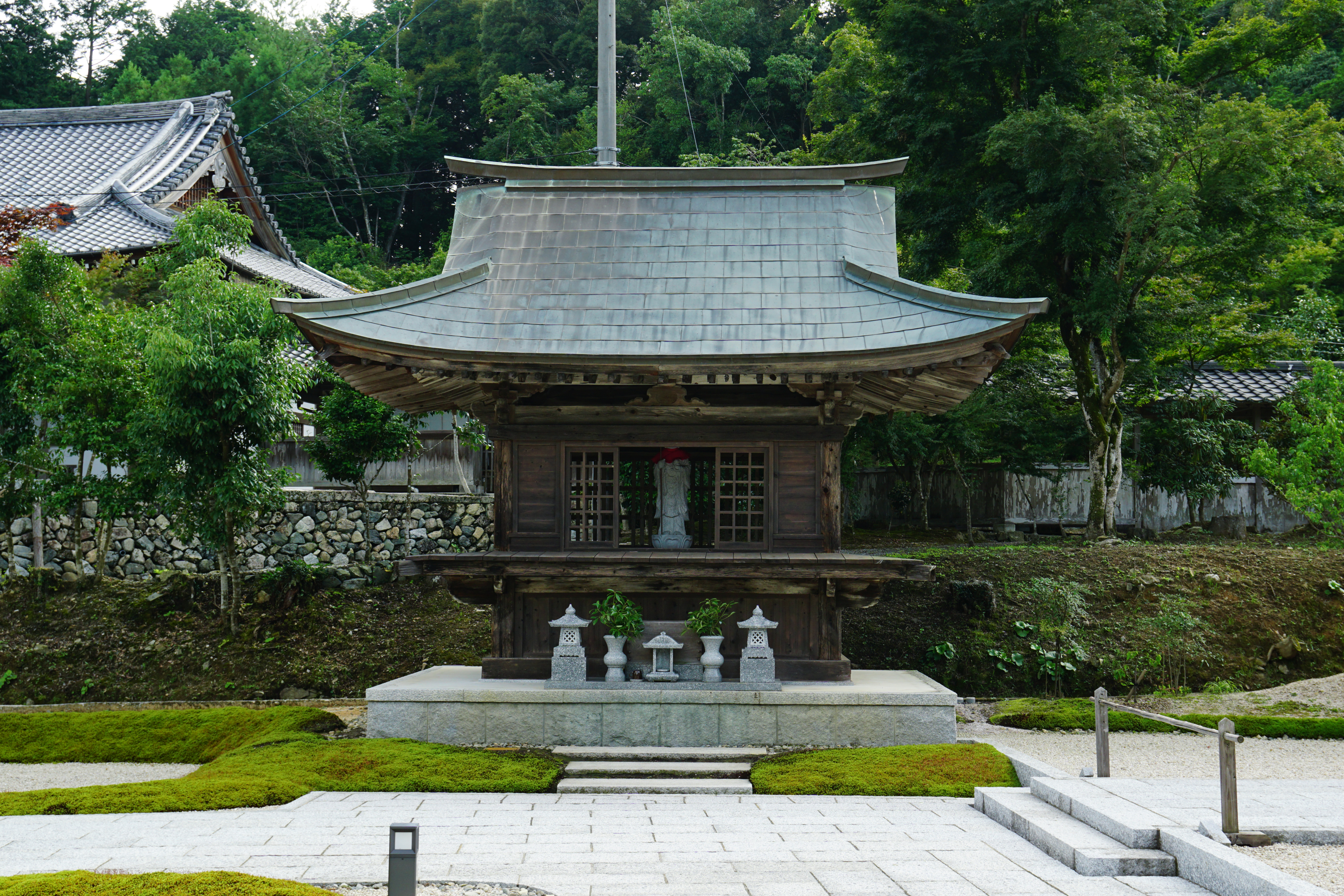
Jizo-do

== See also ==
- List of Historic Sites of Japan (Yamaguchi)
- List of Places of Scenic Beauty of Japan (Yamaguchi)
