= Albert Favre Zanuti =

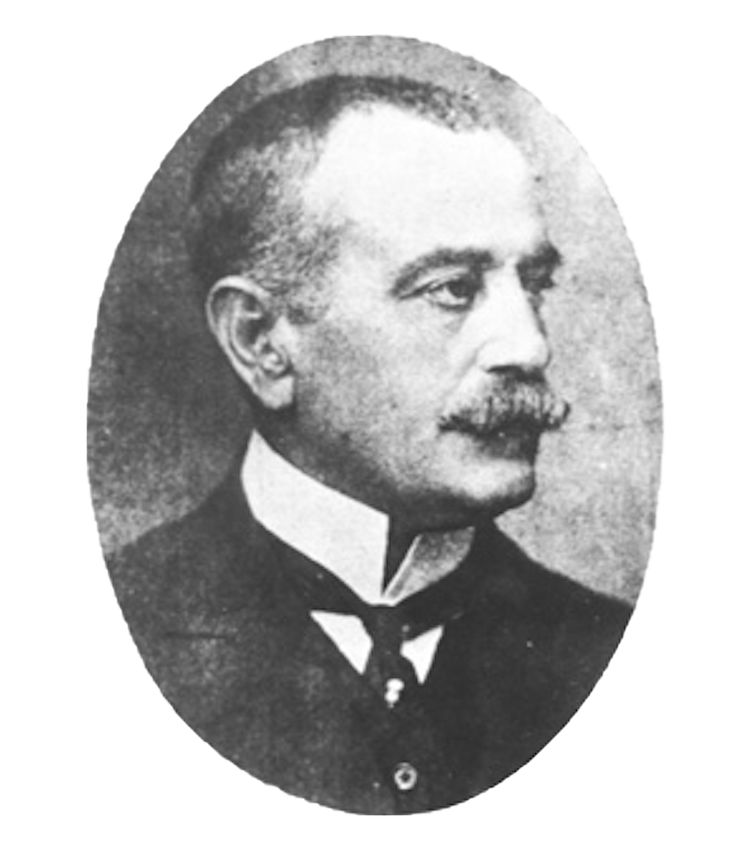
- Born: Alberto Zanuti; Morsano al Tagliamento, Italy
- Died: Yokohama, Japan
- Citizenship: Swiss-Italian
- Occupations: Watchmaker, horologist
- Organization: Zanuti & Cie.
- Known for: O-yatoi Gaikokujin
- Spouse: Alice Favre
- Children: 3

Albert Favre Zanuti was a Swiss-Italian watchmaker and entrepreneur, instrumental in the development of the watchmaking industry in Japan in the 1880s as a O-yatoi Gaikokujin.

== Career overview ==
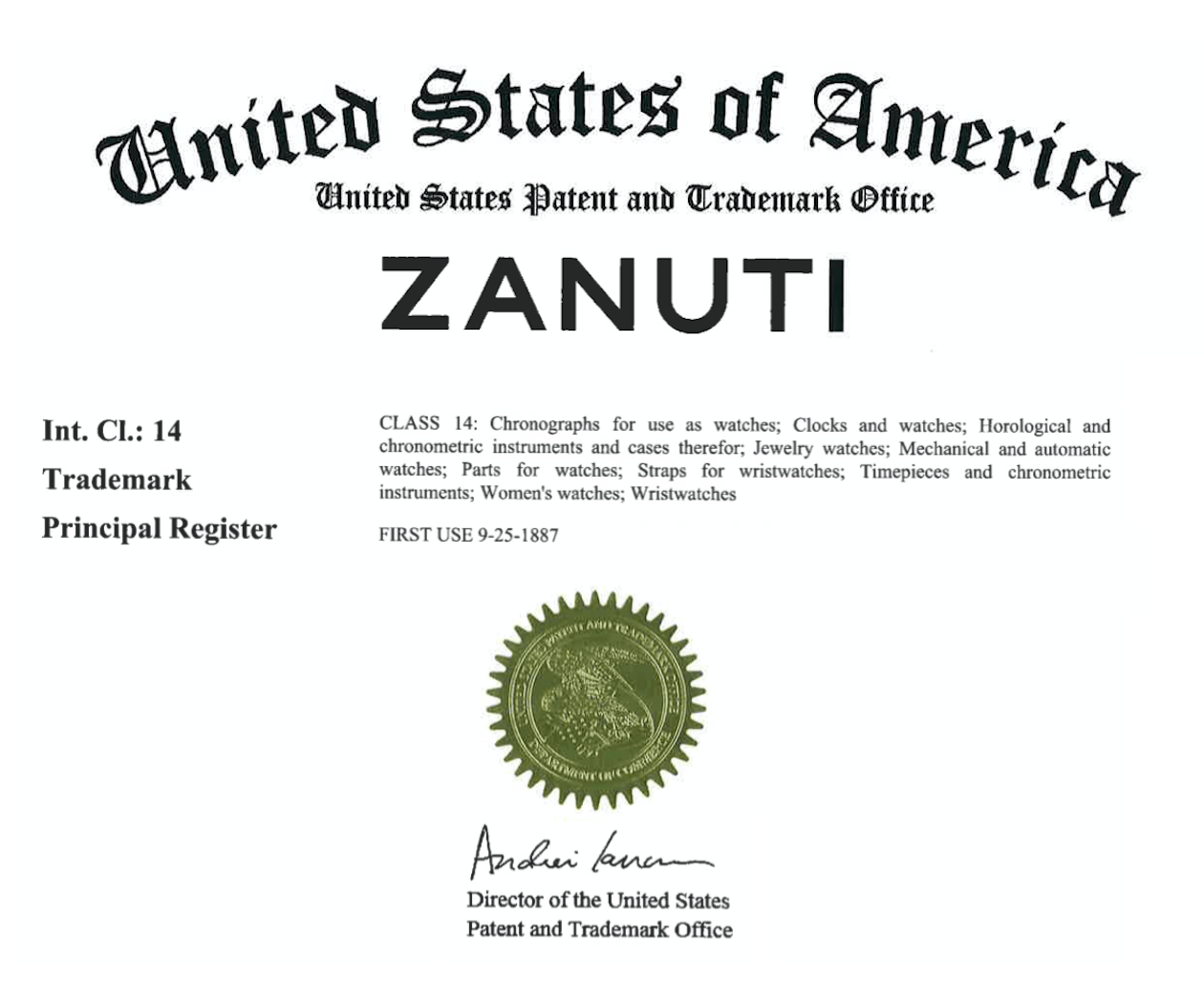
Summary of the official trademark certificate issued by the US Patent and Trademark Office

Zanuti was one of the first watchmakers to travel to Asia (1886) under the O-yatoi Gaikokujin program by the diplomatic invitation of Viscount Aoki Shūzō, and is remembered for his contribution to the early establishment of the watchmaking industry in Japan.

Between the 1870s and the 1880s, Zanuti was one of the main suppliers of pocket watches to brands such as C&J Favre Brandt (founded by his business partner James Favre Brandt) and Siber & Brennwald (established by his acquaintance Kaspar Brennwald, whom he had known since the early days of Union Horlogère Suisse in La Chaux-de-Fonds). As a consequence of the trade agreement between Switzerland and Japan in 1864, both companies were now established in Yokohama, Japan, relying on their Swiss based partners to guarantee supply not just of watches but also spare parts and machinery.

These initial exports of Swiss watches to Japan would be critical in establishing the Japanese watchmaking industry and the birth of the first generation of Japanese watchmakers, including Seijiro Sakurai and Kintarō Hattori (who began his career selling Swiss watches to local Japanese customers and later founded the globally renowned brand Seiko).

In 1887, after several successful years of exports to the US and Japan, Zanuti officially established Zanuti & Cie.

Through the invitation of Viscount Aoki Shūzō, and supported by his longtime business partner James Favre Brandt, Zanuti received a diplomatic invitation to take part in Japan's governmental plan for 'Transfers of technology and cultural ways', joining the so-called O-yatoi Gaikokujin.

== Early life ==
Zanuti started his career as a cabinotier-watchmaker, supplying parts and ébauche movements to established manufactures, also known as etablisseurs.

While working as a cabinotier, he initiated his first sales internationally, exporting Swiss watches to jewelers across Europe and South America. Amongst his first orders were several gold pocket watches sold to Gondolo & Labouriau.

Following in the footsteps of all major watchmakers and Swiss brands of that era, such as Antoni Patek (founder of Patek Philipp) and Jean-Marc Vacheron (founder of brand Vacheron Constantin, Zanuti travelled to the US during the Gilded Age, looking to grow his exports and capitalize on the recent gold rush and expanding Second Industrial Revolution.

Zanuti left the US in 1886, embarking from the port of Seattle to Yokohama, Japan aboard an ocean liner from the American Pacific Mail Steamship Company.

He went on to establish one of the first foreign companies in Asia (Zanuti & Cie.), and was responsible for exporting some of the first Swiss wristwatches into several different Asian countries.

Alongside with François Perregaux and James Favre Brandt, Zanuti was one of the pioneers of watchmaking in Japan.

== Personal life ==
Born Alberto Zanuti, he became known in the watchmaking circles of French-speaking Switzerland as 'Albert' (the French variation of the Italian name 'Alberto').

He was born to an Italian father and Swiss mother near Morsano al Tagliamento, Italy, a small town in the region of Veneto at a five-hour driving distance from Switzerland.

After relocating to his mother's hometown in Switzerland, Zanuti became a watchmaking apprentice at the age of 14, a passion he would pursue for the rest of his life.

He married Swiss nurse Alice Favre, with whom he had three children: Gianni Zanuti, Isabella Zanuti (who would adopt her husband's surname Bianchi) and Anna Maria Zanuti (who would take her husband's surname Sorrentino).

== See also ==
- Foreign government advisors in Meiji Japan
- François Perregaux
- Meiji period
- Foreign relations of Japan

== Books ==
- The first Swiss watchmakers in Asia, chapter by François Chaille, Girard-Perregaux, Editions Flammarion, 2004, ISBN 2080110691
- Documenting the Meiji Era in Japan (1868-1912), Michael R. Auslin, ISBN 9780674022270
- Swiss Imports from Yokohama and Japanese Watch Manufacturers: The Market for Watches in Meiji Era Japan, 1869 – 1912, by Pierre-Yves Donzé
- Turning Points in Japanese History, the Meiji era, Pag. 71-102, edited by Bert Edstrom, 2002
- Notable Oyatoi gaikokujin, by Akashi Shoten ISBN 9784750331508, ISBN 4750331503
- Historical records on foreign residents in Japan, Nyūkan Kyōkai (Tōkyō), ISSN 0915-4876
- Documenting the European Society in Yokohama from 1871 to 1908. Japan weekly mail (OCoLC) 882879033
- The first Swiss watchmakers in Asia, François Chaille, Girard-Perregaux, Editions Flammarion, 2004, ISBN 2080110691
- Le Japon et l'industrie horlogère suisse. Un cas de transfert de technologie durant les années 1880- 1940, Author; Pierre-Yves Donzé.
- Mario M. Einaudi, and Jennifer Allan Goldman. "The Pacific Mail Steamship Company Collection." Southern California Quarterly 94, no. 4 (2012): 407-09.
- Library of Congress, Yokohama publications on its European Society from 1870-1915 Serial number: (OCoLC) ca06001290
- Rolf-Harald Wippich: Japan als Kolonie? Max von Brandts Hokkaido-Projekt 1865/67, Hamburg 1997, ISBN 3-934376-53-3.
