= Yuya, Yamaguchi =

Dissolved municipality in Yamaguchi prefecture, Japan

Yuya (油谷町, Yuya-chō) was a town located in Ōtsu District, Yamaguchi Prefecture, Japan.

As of 2003, the town had an estimated population of 7,857 and a density of 84.24 persons per km^{2}. The total area was 93.27 km^{2}.

On March 22, 2005, Yuya, along with the towns of Heki and Misumi (all from Ōtsu District), was merged into the expanded city of Nagato.
