= Heki, Yamaguchi =

Dissolved municipality in Yamaguchi prefecture, Japan

Heki (日置町, Heki-chō) is a town located in Ōtsu District, Yamaguchi Prefecture, Japan.

As of 2003, the town had an estimated population of 4,602 and a density of 102.68 persons per km^{2}. The total area was 44.82 km^{2}.

On March 22, 2005, Heki, along with the towns of Misumi and Yuya (all from Ōtsu District), was merged into the expanded city of Nagato.
