= Ōtsu District, Yamaguchi =

Former district in Yamaguchi prefecture, Japan

Ōtsu (大津郡, Ōtsu-gun) was a district located in Yamaguchi Prefecture, Japan.

As of 2003, the district had an estimated population of 18,761. The total area was 205.49 km^{2}.

Until March 21, 2005, the district had three towns.

- Heki
- Misumi
- Yuya

On March 22, 2005, the towns of Heki, Misumi and Yuya were merged into the expanded city of Nagato. Ōtsu District was dissolved as a result of this merger.

== History ==
=== Timeline ===
- 1889 - Due to the municipal status enforcement, the villages of Senzakitōri, Fukagawa, Misumi, Tawarayama, 菱海, Utsuga, Mutsugu and Heki. (8 villages)
- April 1, 1899 - A part of the village of Senzakitōri was renamed to become the village of Tōri; and the remaining part of Senzakitōri was renamed to become the village of Senzaki. (9 villages)
- April 15, 1914 - The village of Senzaki was elevated to town status. (1 town, 8 villages)
- November 1, 1928 - The village of Fukagawa was elevated to town status. (2 towns, 7 villages)
- November 3, 1942 - The village of Misumi was elevated to town status. (3 towns, 6 villages)
- March 31, 1954 - The towns of Senzaki and Fukagawa, and the villages of Tōri and Tawarayama were merged to create the city of Nagato. (1 town, 4 villages)
- May 1, 1954 - The villages of 菱海村, Utsuga, Mutsugu and a part of Heki were merged to create the town of Yuya. (2 towns, 1 village)
- April 1, 1978 - The village of Heki (remaining parts) was elevated to town status. (3 towns)
- March 22, 2005 - The towns of Heki, Misumi and Yuya were merged into the expanded city of Nagato. Ōtsu District was dissolved as a result of this merger.

== See also ==
- List of dissolved districts of Japan
