= Misumi, Yamaguchi =

Dissolved municipality in Yamaguchi prefecture, Japan

Misumi (三隅町, Misumi-chō) was a town located in Ōtsu District, Yamaguchi Prefecture, Japan.

As of 2003, the town had an estimated population of 6,302 and a density of 93.50 persons per km^{2}. The total area was 67.40 km^{2}.

On March 22, 2005, Misumi, along with the towns of Heki and Yuya (all from Ōtsu District), was merged into the expanded city of Nagato.
