= François Perregaux =

Swiss watchmaker and businessman

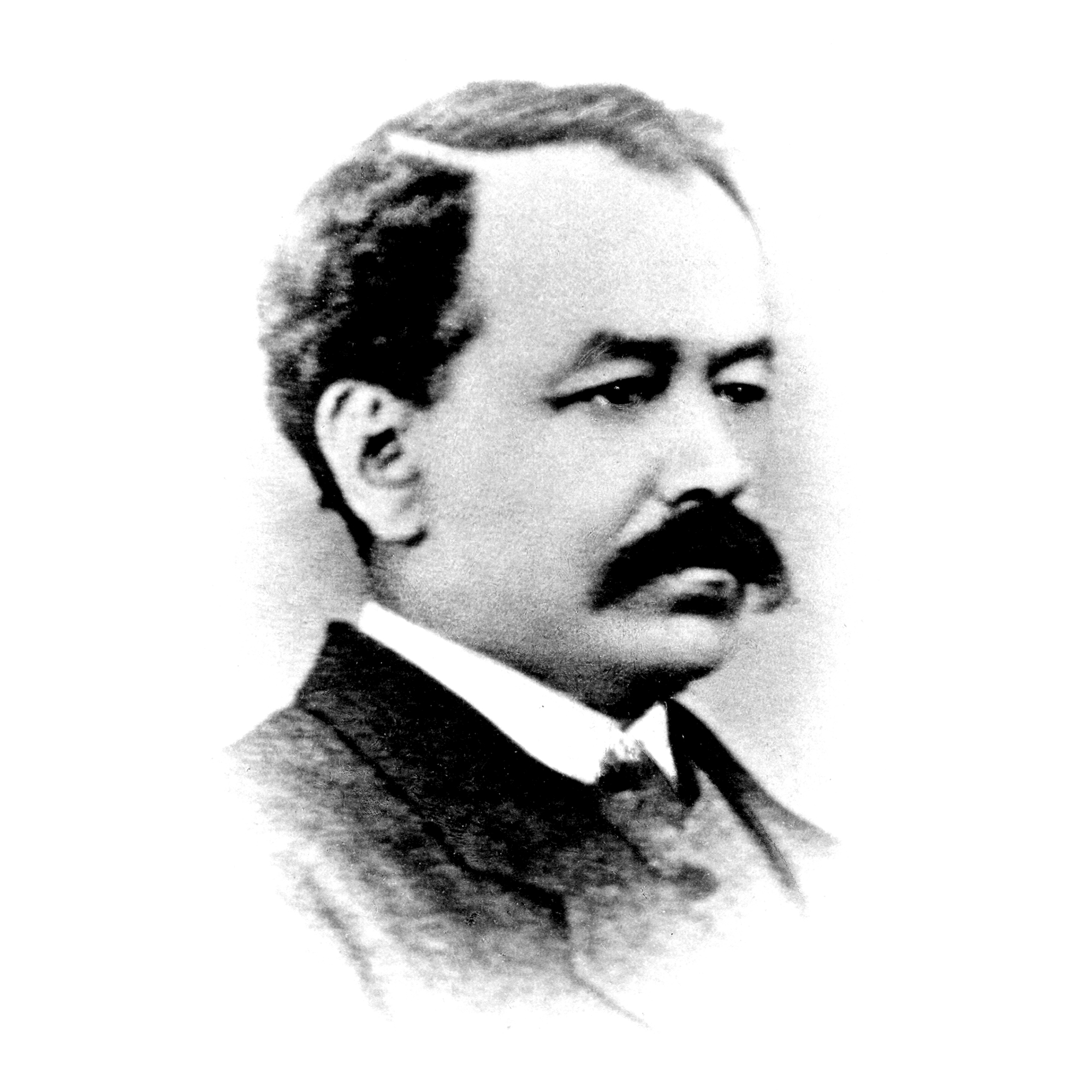
- Born: 25 June 1834; Le Locle, Switzerland
- Died: 18 December 1877 (aged 43); Yokohama, Japan
- Occupations: Watchmaker, businessman
- Years active: 1852–1877
- Known for: F. Perregaux & Co. and Girard-Perregaux

François Perregaux (1834 Le Locle, Switzerland – 1877, Yokohama, Japan) was a Swiss watchmaker and businessman. He was the first European watchmaker to travel to Asia (1863) and is remembered for his contribution to establishing the watchmaking industry in Japan.

== Family ==
Perregaux was born to Henri François Perregaux and Rosalie Matthey-Junod, both established watchmakers from Le Locle, Switzerland. His siblings included Jules Perregaux, Henri Perregaux, Françoise Perregaux and Marie Perregaux. Little is known about his personal life other than that he had a daughter, Eliza Perregaux, who was buried in the cemetery of Yokohama, next to him.

== Milestones ==
Perregaux was brother to Marie Perregaux who co-founded the brand Girard-Perregaux along with Constant Girard in 1852. François was instrumental in the early stages of the company, traveling to the USA and Japan to assist in its exports overseas. Girard-Perregaux remains one of the oldest Swiss watch brands still in business today.

Perregaux, James Favre-Brandt and Albert Favre Zanuti, are credited as the pioneers of mechanical watchmaking in Japan.

Perregaux is also credited for establishing the first Swiss company in Japan (F. Perregaux & Co.), which was responsible for importing the first wristwatches into the country, in 1865.

== Death ==
Perregaux died unexpectedly of an apoplectic attack on December 18, 1877 at 43 years of age.
