= Chōmonkyō Prefectural Natural Park =

Natural park of Yamaguchi prefecture, Japan

Coordinates: 34°19′7″N 131°34′5″E

- 長門峡県立自然公園
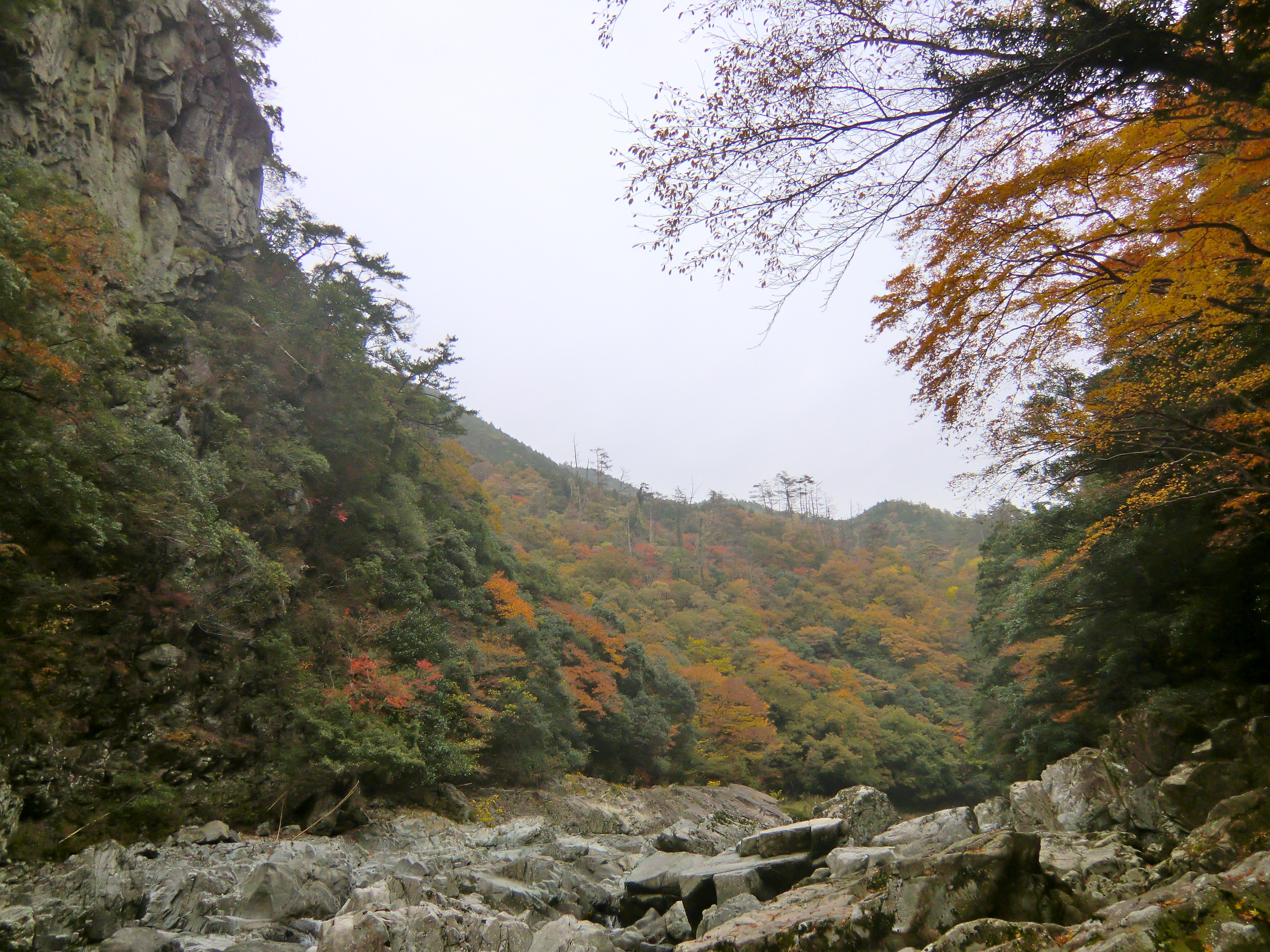
- Chōmonkyō
- Interactive map of Chōmonkyō Prefectural Natural Park
- Location: Yamaguchi Prefecture, Japan
- Nearest city: Hagi/Yamaguchi
- Area: 56.56 km^{2} (21.84 sq mi)
- Established: 1 March 1962

Chōmonkyō Prefectural Natural Park (長門峡県立自然公園, Chōmonkyō kenritsu shizen kōen) is a Prefectural Natural Park in central Yamaguchi Prefecture, Japan. Established in 1962, the park spans the borders of the municipalities of Hagi and Yamaguchi.

== See also ==
- National Parks of Japan
