= Fujimitsu Corporation =

- Native name: フジミツ株式会社
- Type: Private KK
- Industry: Food
- Predecessor: Fujimitsu Kamaboko Industry Co.
- Founded: 1887; 139 years ago in Senzaki, Yamaguchi
- Headquarters: Nagato, Yamaguchi 759-4101, Japan
- Area served: Asia
- Key people: Masafumi Fujita (President)
- Products: Kamaboko; Chikuwa; Oden
- Revenue: JPY 9.7 billion (FY 2014) (US$ 79.5 million) (FY 2017)
- Subsidiaries: Hakata Uoka; Sankyu Suisan; Kirara Organic Life; FM Nagato
- Website: Official website

Content in this edit is translated from the existing Japanese Wikipedia article at フジミツ; see its history for attribution

Fujimitsu Corporation (フジミツ株式会社, Fujimitsu Kabushiki-gaisha) is a manufacturer of fish surimi products based in the city of Nagato, Yamaguchi Prefecture, Japan. In 2008, it was Japan's eighth largest surimi manufacturer in terms of sales. The company's products include surimi standards such as kamaboko, chikuwa, and imitation crab as well as original products, such as Cheese Colone, which are bite-size balls of kamaboko with a cheese food filling. Fujimitsu's Cheese Colone won a bronze medal from Monde Selection in 2010.

== History ==
Fujimitsu was founded in 1887 in the seaside village of Senzaki, which is today part of the city of Nagato.

In 1964, Fujimitsu transferred to a company organization and was incorporated as Fujimitsu Kamaboko Kogyo KK, or Fujimitsu Kamaboko Industry Co.

In 1967 it moved to its current location in the Higashifukawa area of Nagato. At present, the company has plants in Misumi and Senzaki in addition to its head office/plant in Higashifukawa.

On March 1, 2007, the company changed its name to Fujimitsu Corporation as part of a corporate identity makeover.

On September 16, 2008, the company obtained ISO 22000 certification, the international standard for food safety management.

On April 29, 2010, Fujimitsu signed an agreement to set up a joint venture with Rongcheng Taixiang Aquatic Food Co., Ltd., which is a member of China's Taixiang Group. The new company, named Rongcheng Taizheng Tengguang Foods Co., Ltd., manufactures boil-in-the-bag oden, imitation crab (kanikama), chikuwa, deep-fried foods, and other surimi products for export to Japan, Korea, and other parts of Asia in addition to sales in the Chinese market.

== Affiliated companies ==
- Sankyu Suisan Co., Ltd., a manufacturer of fish surimi products. Sankyu Suisan was established as an affiliated company of the Kyushu branch of Tetsudou Kousaikai (now JR Kyushu Retail Inc.) and became a Fujimitsu subsidiary through an M&A in 2000. Nowadays, the company continues to market products to kiosks operating at JR Kyushu stations. The company obtained ISO 22000 certification on July 16, 2009.
- FM Nagato Co., Ltd., a community broadcast radio station serving the city of Nagato.
- Kirara Organic Life Inc., an organic farm in the town of Mito where visitors can pick their own vegetables.
- Hakata Uoka Co., Ltd., a manufacturer of fish surimi products. In 2005, Fujimitsu acquired Uoka Co., Ltd., a long-established kamaboko company in Fukuoka, and set up Hakata Uoka as an operating company. The company obtained ISO 22000 certification on September 7, 2007.
- Hakata Nakamuraya Co., Ltd., a company established through a joint investment with Nakamuraya Co., Ltd. the company operates a business selling Hakata brand gifts.
- Rongcheng Taizheng Tengguang Foods Co., Ltd., a manufacturer of fish surimi products. The company, which is located in the city of Rongcheng, Shandong Province, China, was established in 2010 as a joint venture with Rongcheng Taixiang Aquatic Food Co., Ltd. Rongcheng Taixiang Aquatic Food is a member of the Taixiang Group, a major corporate group in China's foods sector.

== See also ==
- Moomin – Characters used in the marketing of Fujimitsu's Cheese Colone bite-size balls of kamaboko with a cheese food filling
