= Kita-Nagato Kaigan Quasi-National Park =

Quasi-National Park on the coast of Yamaguchi Prefecture, Japan

- 北長門海岸国定公園
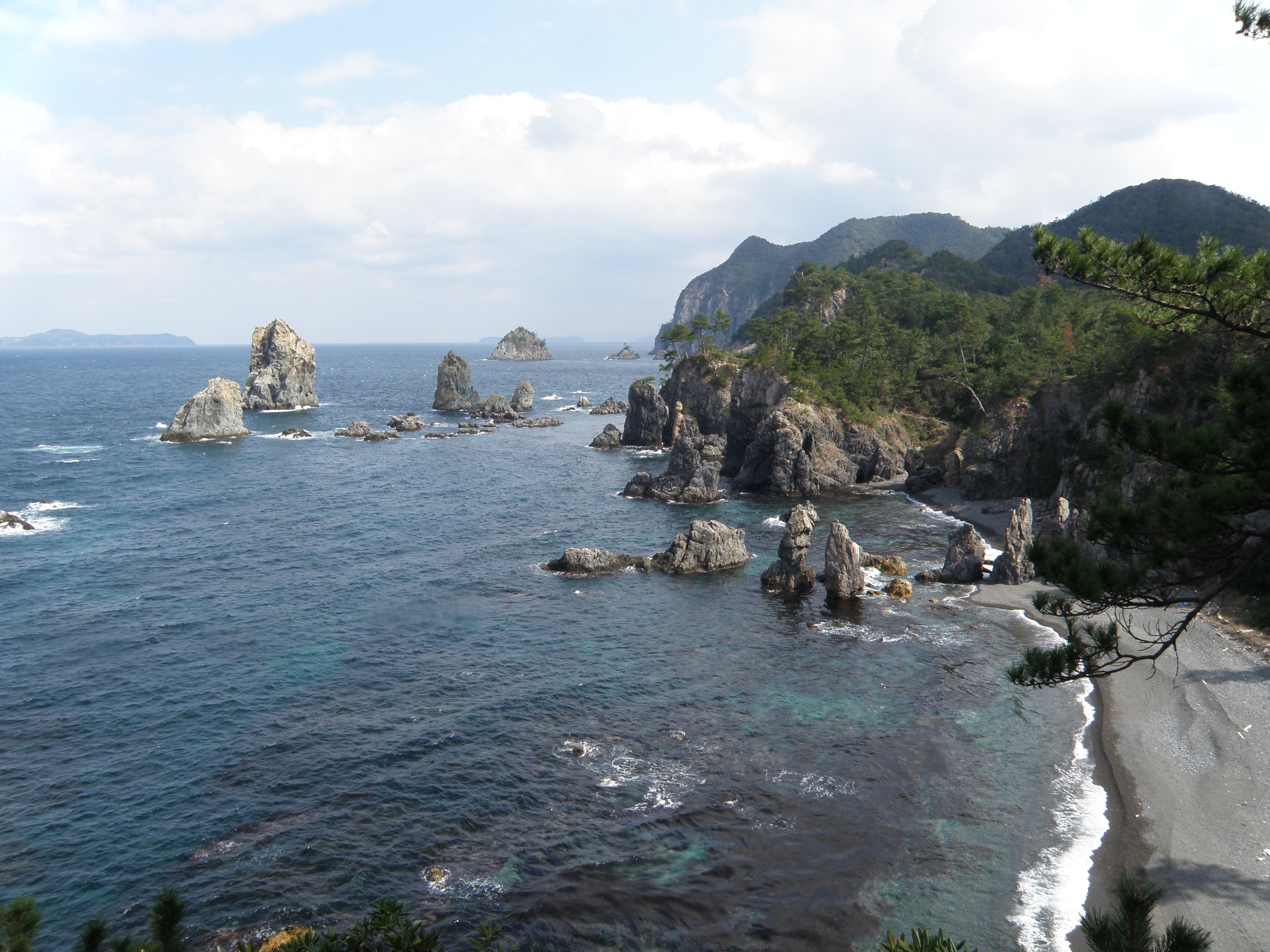
- Omijima

- Location within Japan
- Location: Yamaguchi Prefecture, Japan
- Nearest city: Hagi
- Coordinates: 34°26′56″N 131°25′34″E
- Area: 80.21 km^{2} (30.97 sq mi)
- Established: November 1, 1955

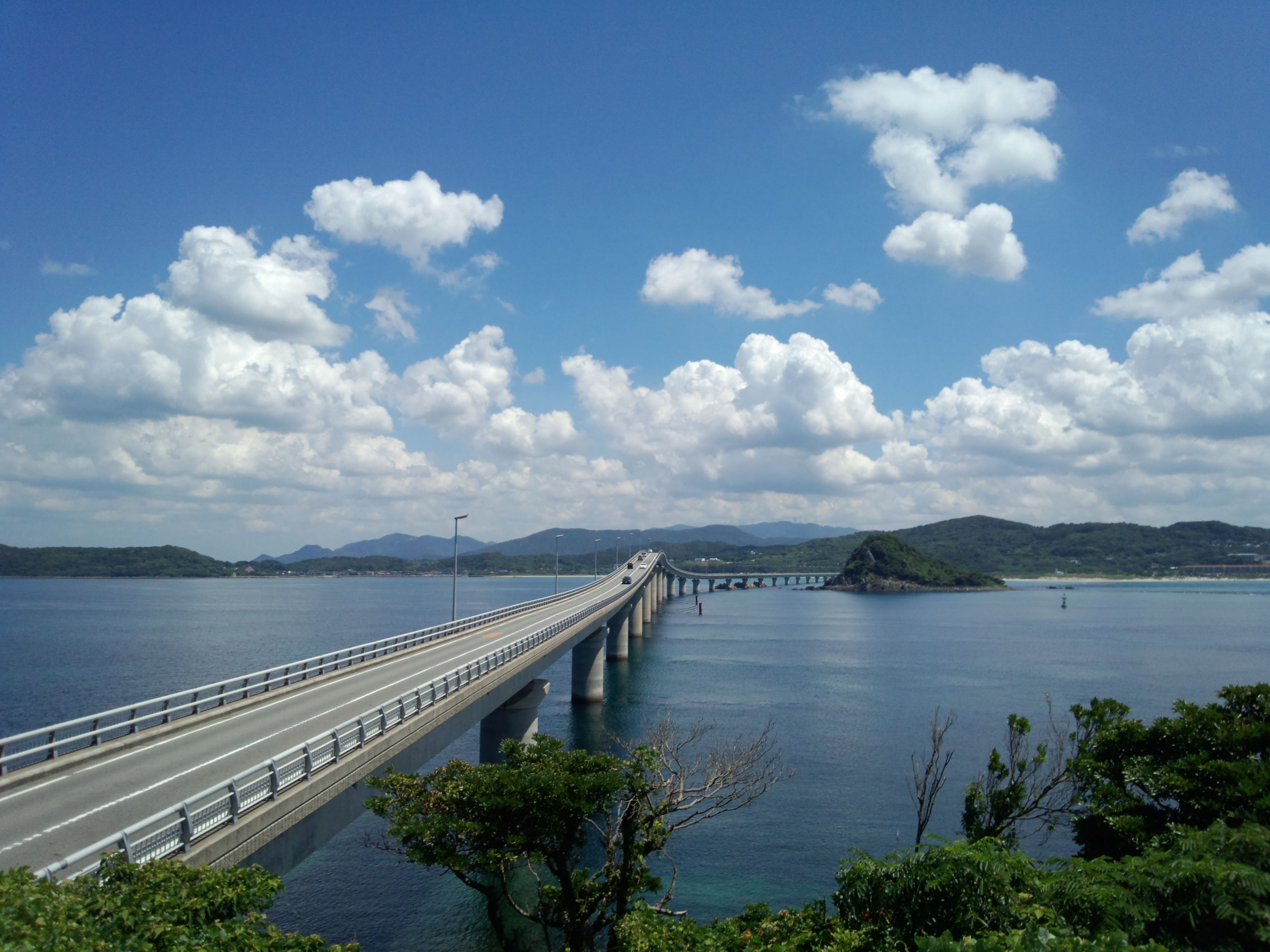
One of famous sightseeing in Kita-Nagato Kaigan Kokutei Kōen. This bridge's name is Tsunoshima Ohashi

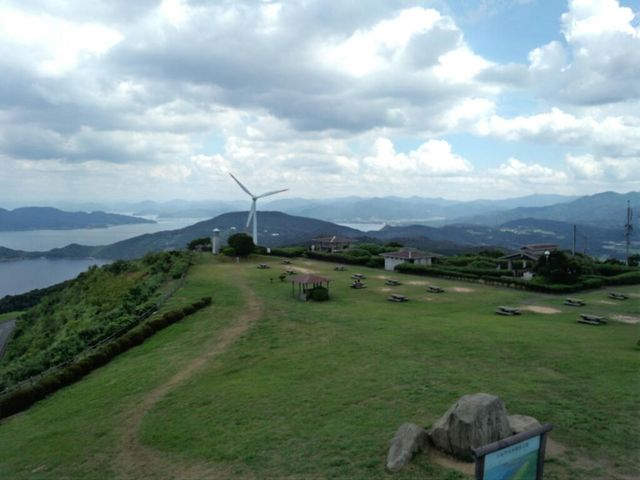
One of famous sightseeing in Kita-Nagato Kaigan Kokutei Kōen. This is Senjojiki.

Kita-Nagato Kaigan Quasi-National Park (北長門海岸国定公園, Kita-Nagato Kaigan Kokutei Kōen) is a Quasi-National Park on the coast of Yamaguchi Prefecture, Japan. It was founded on 1 November 1955 and has an area of 80.21 km^{2} (30.97 sq mi).

== See also ==
- List of national parks of Japan
