= Buzenda =

Commercial area in Shimonoseki, Japan

Coordinates: 33°57′06.37″N 130°55′37.82″E

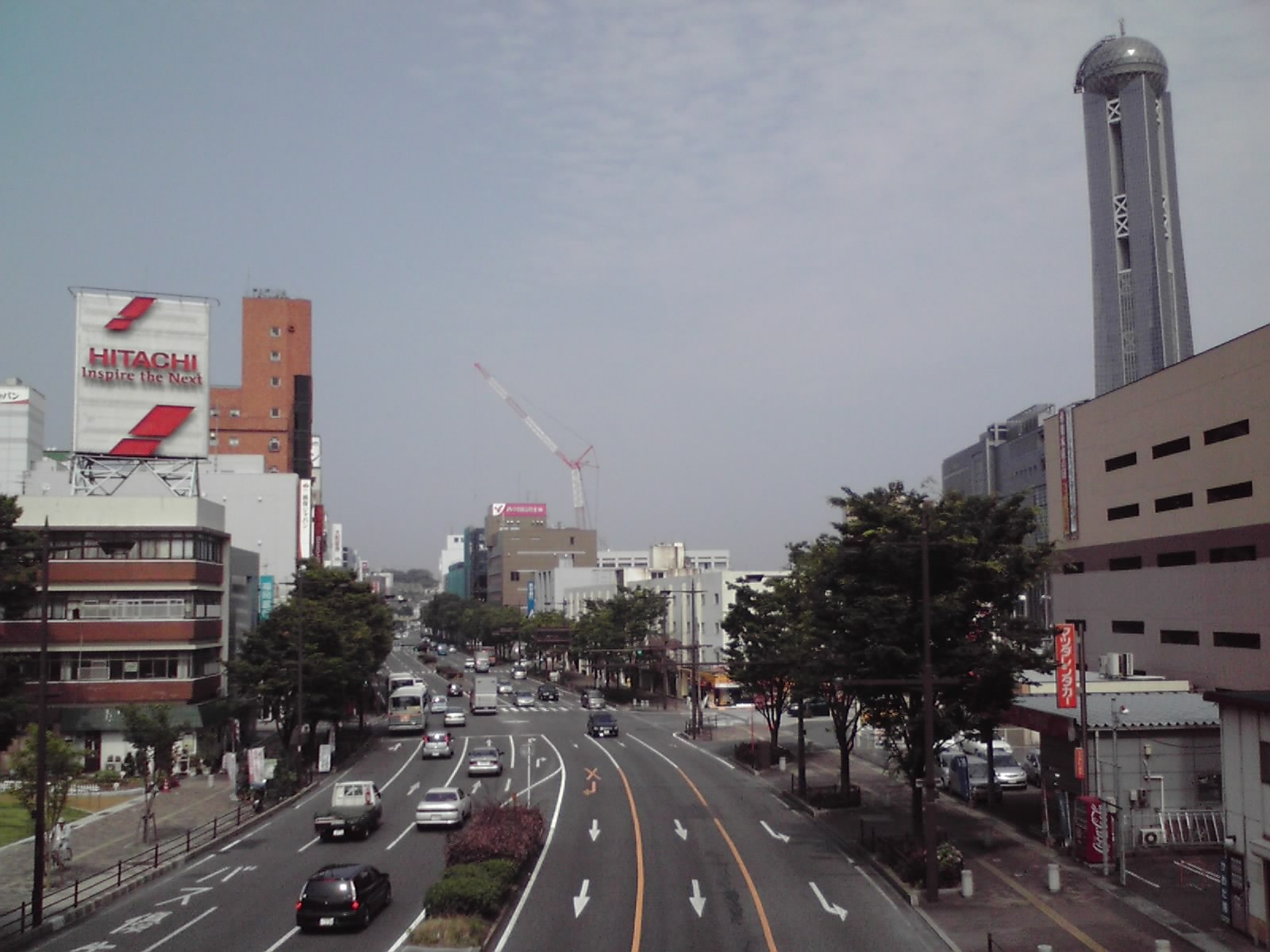
Japan National Road Route 9

Buzenda (豊前田, ぶぜんだ) refers to the downtown area of Shimonoseki City, Japan. It is located in the Shimonoseki Station area, and it is known as the most famous downtown area in Yamaguchi Prefecture. There are izakaya, karaoke bars, and other social venues around Buzenda-cho-2.

== Sightseeing ==
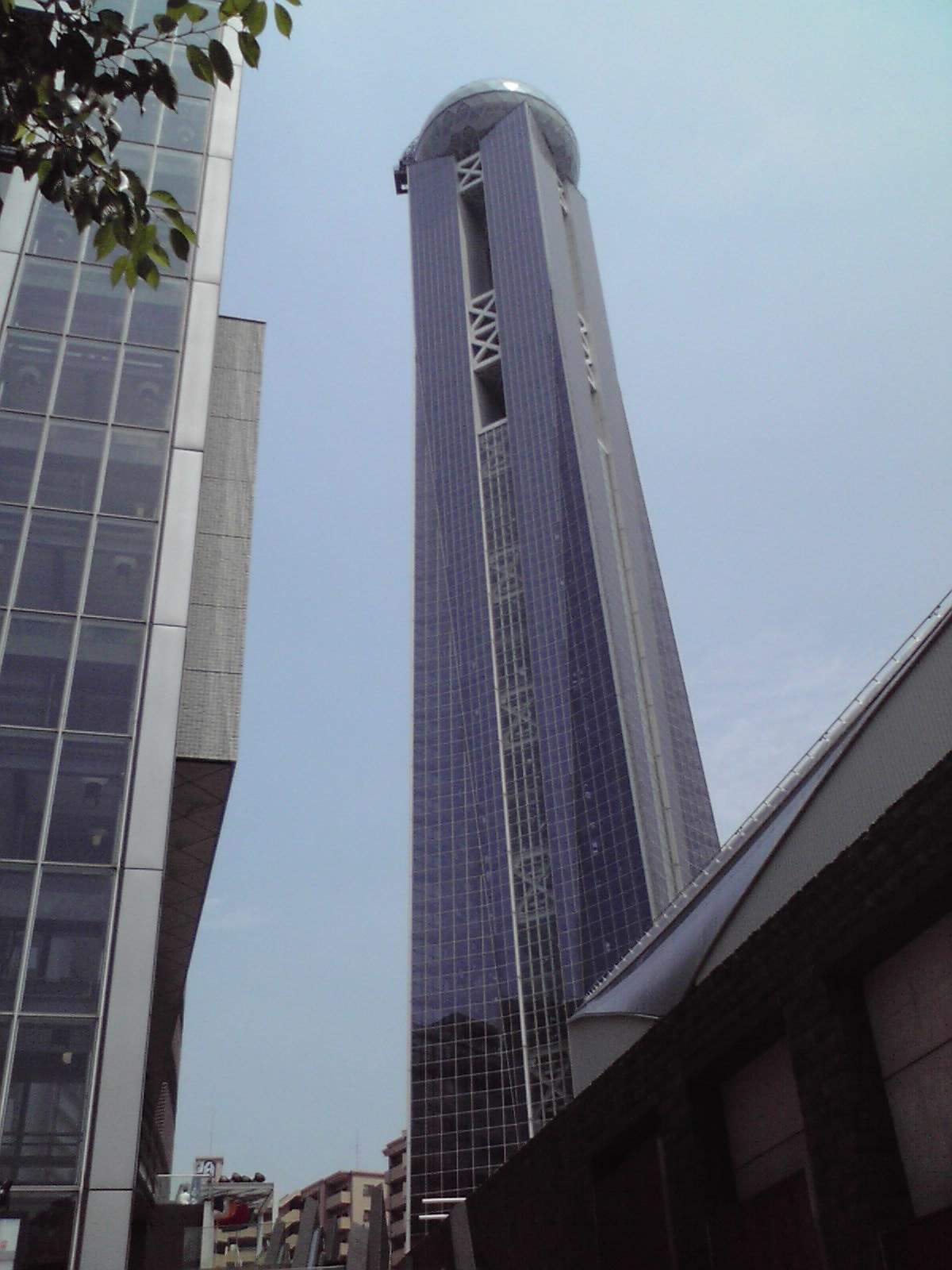
Kaikyo Yume Tower (153m)

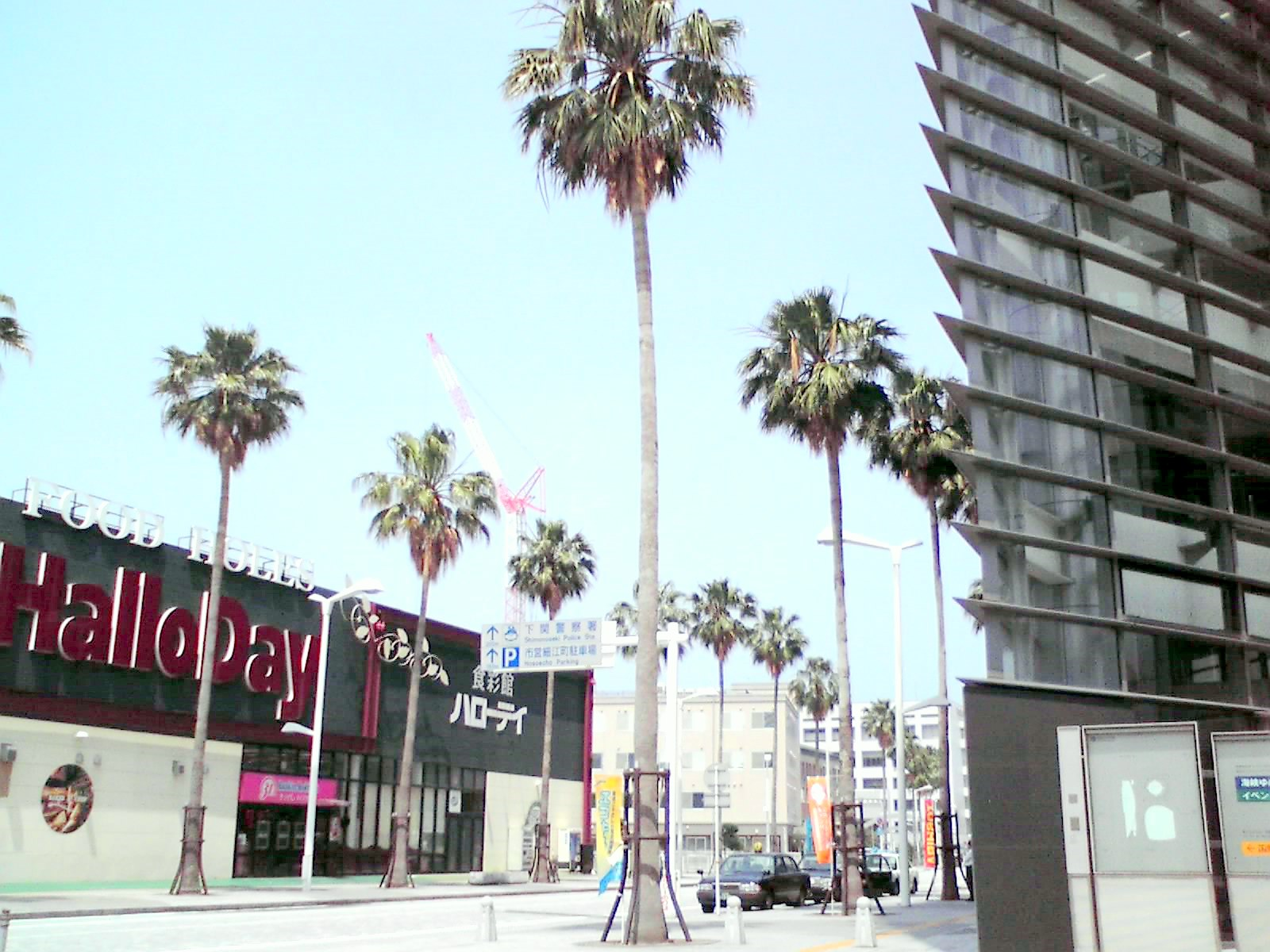
Buzenda

Shops

- Buzenda Shopping Street (Shinsaku-Dori)

The Buzenda shopping street includes a lot of famous fugu restaurants and seafood restaurants, etc.

- Daiso (100-yen shop, Over 2,350m^{2})
- EDION(home electronics store)

Sightseeing

- Kaikyo Yume Tower (Kaikyo Messe Shimonoseki)

Hotels

Most hotels and inns are around Shimonoseki Station and Karato.

- Toyoko Inn Shimonoseki-eki Higashi-guchi

Others

- Kaikyo Messe Shimonoseki International Trade Building
  - YM Securities Co., Ltd.(head office)
  - NHK Shimonoseki Branch Office
  - JETRO Yamaguchi
  - Passport Center
  - Yamaguchi Asahi Broadcasting Shimonoseki branch office
- Nishi-chugoku Shinkin Bank(head office)
- Sompo Japan Shimonoseki Building

== Festivals ==
- Shimonoseki Kaikyo Festival (May)
- Kanmon Kaikyo Fireworks Festival (August)
- Shimonoseki Bakan Festival (August)
- Shimonoseki Kaikyo Marathon (November)

== Transportation ==
=== Ferries from Shimonoseki Port International Terminal ===
- The Kanpu ferry to Pusan in South Korea regularly.
- The Orient ferry to Qingdao in China regularly.
- The Orient ferry to Shanghai in China regularly.

=== Trains ===
- Nearby station
  - Shimonoseki Station(Sanyō Main Line)
- Nearby Shinkansen Station
  - Shin-Shimonoseki Station(Sanyō Shinkansen)

=== Buses ===
- Nearby bus stop
  - “Buzenda” (Sanden Kohtsu Co., Ltd.)

== See also ==
- Shimonoseki city
- Shimonoseki Station
