= Baiko Gakuin University =

Higher education institution in Yamaguchi Prefecture, Japan

Coordinates: 33°58′03″N 130°55′57″E

- 梅光学院大学
- Motto: ut filii lucis ambulate ("let us walk as children of light")
- Type: Private
- Established: 1872
- Location: Shimonoseki, Yamaguchi prefecture, Japan
- Campus: Urban
- Mascot: None

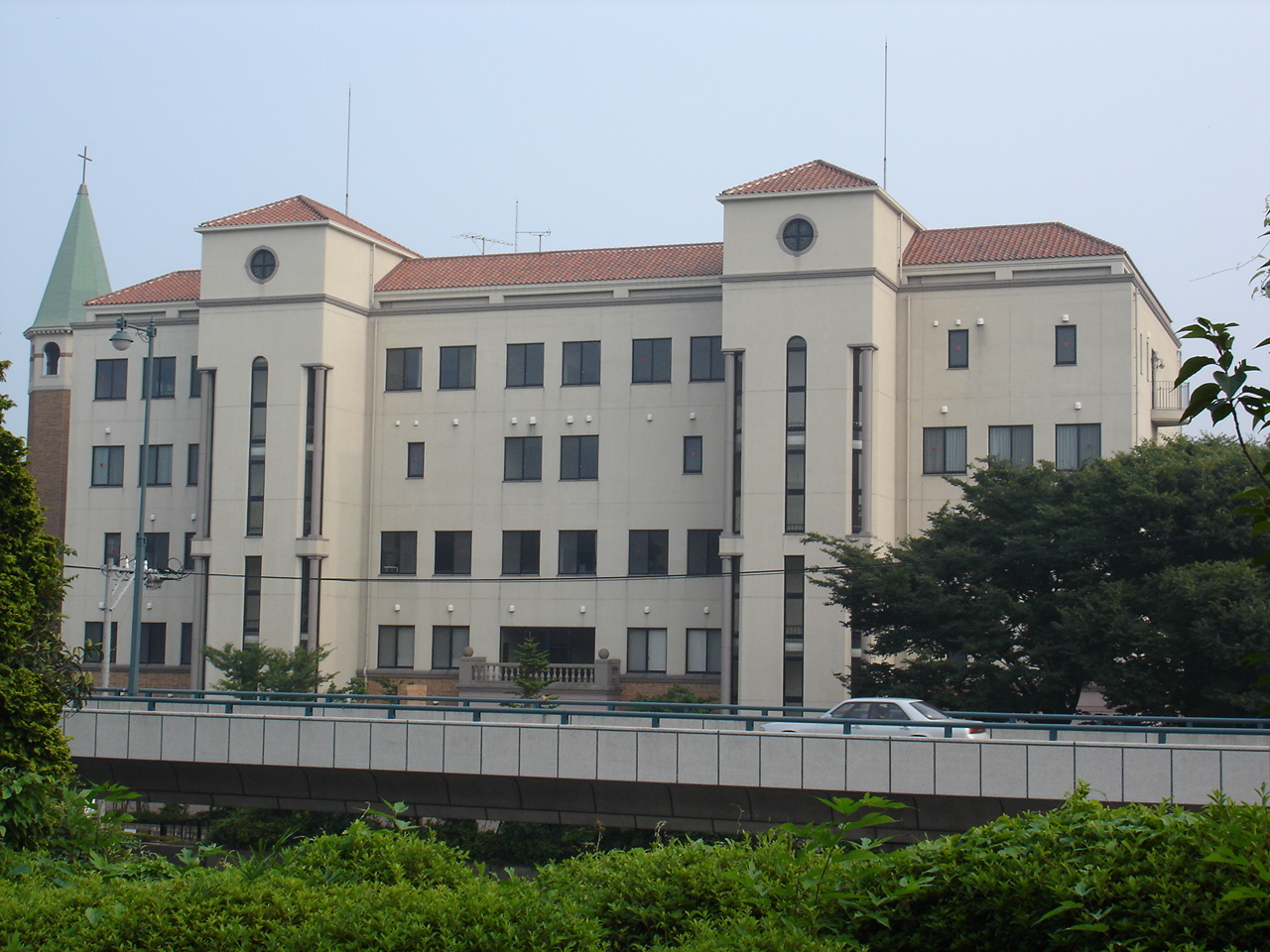
Baiko Gakuin University

Baiko Gakuin University (梅光学院大学, Baikō gakuin daigaku) is a private university in Shimonoseki, Yamaguchi, Japan.

The predecessor of the school was founded in 1872, and it was chartered as a women's junior college in 1964. The school's emblem (a stylized plum blossom) and kanji name Baiko (梅光, Baikō) reflect the names of the two schools merged to form Baiko Gakuin.

In 1967, the school began to operate as a four-year college, which became co-ed in 2001; the women's junior college continued to run within the university until 2006, when it was dissolved and its operations folded into the university. The school has a long affiliation with its namesake women's junior high and high school, Baiko jo Gakuin, also in Shimonoseki.

The school's Latin motto ut filii lucis ambulate ('let us walk as children of light'), drawn from Ephesians 5:8, reflects the Christian influence on its founding, an influence still reflected today in its daily chapel services and hospitality to Christian teachers.

== Faculties (Undergraduate Schools) ==
=== School of (Japanese) Literature ===
- Department of Japanese Literature
  - Major in Literature and Arts
  - Major in Japanese Language and Literature
  - Major in Area Studies

=== School of International Languages and Cultures ===
- Department of English Language and Literature
  - Major in English Language
  - Major in English and American Literature
  - Major in International Business
  - Major in Children's English Education
- Department of East Asian Languages and Cultures
  - Major in Chinese Language and Culture
  - Major in Korean Language and Culture
  - Major in Japanese Language and Culture

=== School of Child Development Studies ===
- Department of Child Development Studies
  - Major in Children's Education
  - Major in Early Childhood Education

== Graduate Schools ==
- Japanese Literature
- English and American Literature

== Institutes ==
- Baiko Gakuin University Institute of Language Education
- Baiko Gakuin University Institute of Area Studies
- Baiko Gakuin University Museum
- Information Education Center
- International Center
- English Education Center
- University Library
- 生涯学習センター
- 梅光多世代交流支援センター

== Sister Schools ==
- Baiko Jogakuin High School & Junior High School
- Baiko Gakuin Kindergarten

== See also ==
- Shimonoseki Station
- Hatabu Station
- Shimonoseki City
