= Hatabu Station =

Railway station in Shimonoseki, Yamaguchi Prefecture, Japan

Hatabu Station 幡生駅
- Hatabu Station in June 2026

General information
- Location: 1-1, Hatabu Miyanoshitacho, Shimonoseki-shi, Yamaguchi-ken 751-0829; Japan
- Coordinates: 33°58′49.01″N 130°55′37.01″E
- Owner: West Japan Railway Company
- Operator: West Japan Railway Company
- Lines: ■ Sanyo Main Line; ■ Sanin Main Line
- Distance: 524.6 km (326.0 miles) from Kobe
- Platforms: 2 island platforms
- Tracks: 4
- Connections: Bus stop

Other information
- Status: Unstaffed
- Website: Official website

History
- Opened: 27 May 1901; 125 years ago

Passengers
- FY2020: 2017

Services
Preceding station	JR West	Following station
Shimonoseki Terminus	San'yō Line Local	Shin-Shimonoseki towards Iwakuni
Shimonoseki Terminus	San'in Main Line Local	Ayaragi towards Masuda
Location
- Location within Yamaguchi Prefecture Location within Japan

Hatabu Station (幡生駅, Hatabu-eki) is a passenger railway station located in the city of Shimonoseki, Yamaguchi Prefecture, Japan. It is operated by the West Japan Railway Company (JR West). The station is adjacent to Hatabu Switchyard of Japan Freight Railway Company (JR Freight)

== Lines ==
Hatabu Station is served by the JR West San'yō Main Line, and is located 524.6 kilometers from the terminus of the line at Kobe. It is also the nominal western terminus of the JR West San'in Main Line, and is located 673.8 kilometers from the opposing terminus of that line at Kyoto; however all San'in Main Line trains continue further 3.5 kilometers to terminate at Shimonoseki

== Station layout ==
The station consists of two raised island platforms connected to the station building via a footbridge. The station has been unstaffed since September 2025.

== Platforms ==
1	■ San'yō Line	for Shimonoseki
2	■ San'in Main Line	for Shimonoseki
3	■ San'in Main Line	for Kogushi and Nagatoshi
4	■ San'yō Line	for Shin-Shimonoseki and Shin-Yamaguchi

== History ==
Hatabu Station was opened on 27 May 1901 on the San'yō Railway when the line was extended from Asa Station to Bakan Station (present-day Shimonoseki Station) The San'yō Railway was railway nationalized in 1906 and the line renamed the San'yō Main Line in 1909. On 22 April 1914, the Chōshū Railway began operations. It was nationalized in 1925 becoming the Ogushi Line. The station was moved to its present location on 19 November 1928, per a route change of the San'yō Main Line between Chōfu and Shimonoseki. The Ogushi Line was incorporated into the San'in Main Line in 1933. With the privatization of the Japan National Railway (JNR) on 1 April 1987, the station came under the aegis of the West Japan railway Company (JR West).

== Passenger statistics ==
In fiscal 2020, the station was used by an average of 2017 passengers daily.

== Surrounding area ==
Yamaguchi Prefectural Road No. 258 Mukuno Line (former Yamaguchi Prefectural Road No. 249 Hatao Station Mukuno Line) runs south of the station, and the old Japan National Route 191 runs behind the station. Hatabu Miyanoshita-cho, where the station is located, is located at the southern end of the Yamanoda area, one of the central areas of Shimonoseki City, and is an educational district where many high schools are located,

- Shimonoseki general depot
- Shimonoseki Sake Brewery
- Shimonoseki City University
- Baiko Gakuin University
- Shimonoseki Commercial High School
- Yamaguchi Prefectural Shimokansai High School
- Yamaguchi Prefectural Shimonoseki Central Technical High School
- Yamaguchi Prefectural Shimonoseki Futaba High School

== See also ==
- List of railway stations in Japan
