= Kaikyo Messe Shimonoseki =

Building in Shimonoseki, Yamaguchi Prefecture, Japan

Coordinates: 33°57′00″N 130°55′46″E

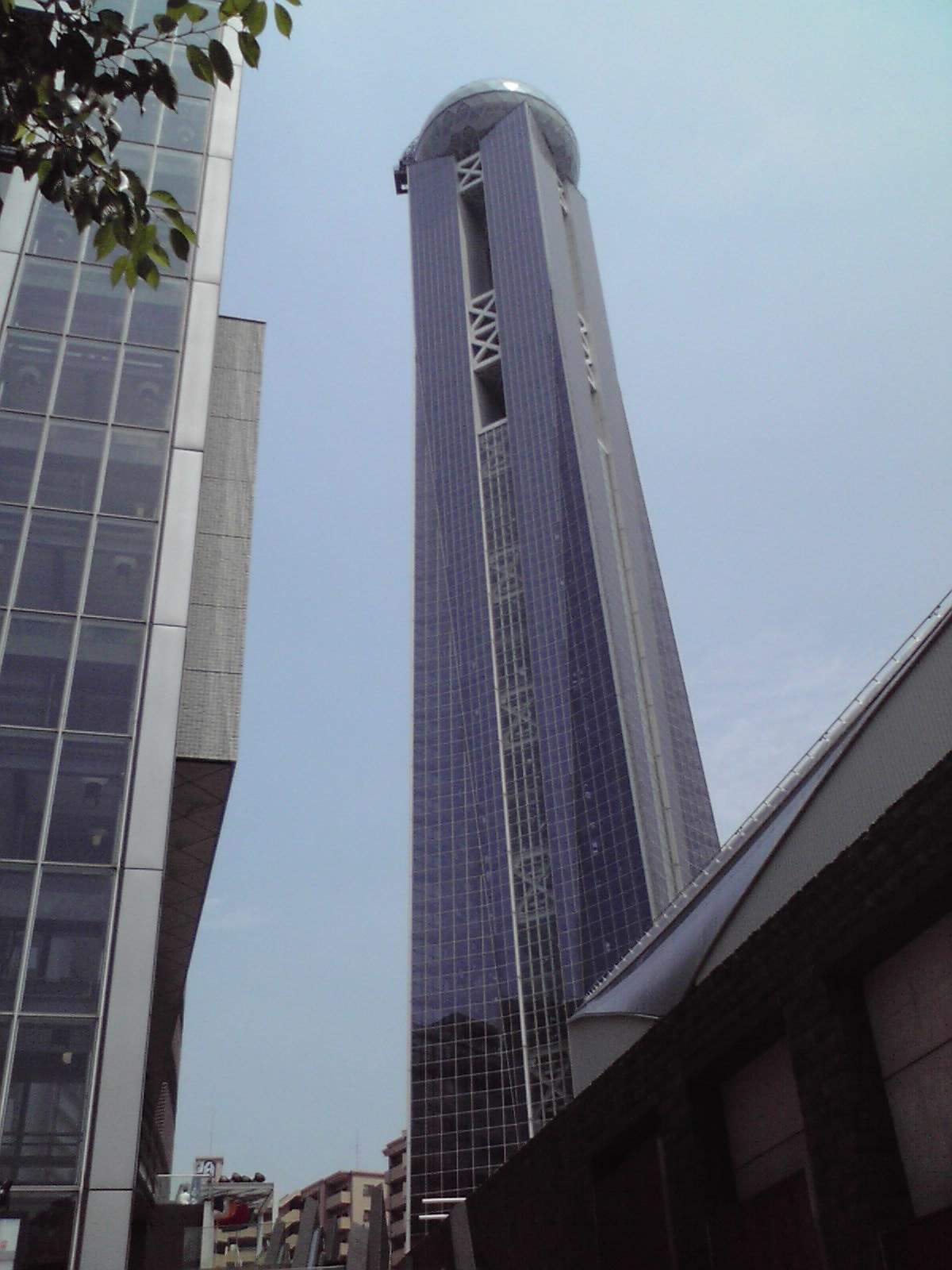
Kaikyō Yume Tower (153m)

Yamaguchi International Trade & Cultural Center or Kaikyo Messe Shimonoseki (海峡メッセ下関) is a complex facility located in Shimonoseki, Yamaguchi Prefecture, Japan. This building consists of Kaikyō Yume Tower and the International Trade Building.

== Kaikyō Yume Tower ==
The Kaikyō Yume Tower (海峡ゆめタワー) dominates the city of Shimonoseki and is the tallest tower in western Japan. Standing 153 metres tall, it was opened in July 1996. It forms a part of the Kaikyō Messe Shimonoseki building, which houses a conference centre and corporate offices.

The tower was designed by NTT Power and Building Facilities and built by Takenaka Corporation.

Upon paying an admission fee, tourists can visit an observation deck in the glass sphere at the top of the building for panoramic views over the city and the Kanmon Straits.

The address of the tower is 3-3-1 Buzenda-cho, Shimonoseki, Yamaguchi, 750-0018

== See also ==
- Buzenda (the most famous downtown in Yamaguchi Prefecture)
- Shimonoseki Station
- Shimonoseki
- Yamaguchi Kokusai Sōgo Center
