= 100-yen shop =

Type of Japanese shop akin to dollar store

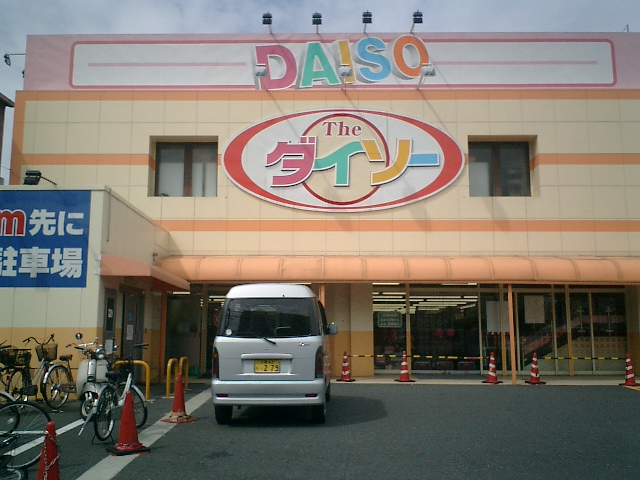
Daiso at Hanaten, Osaka

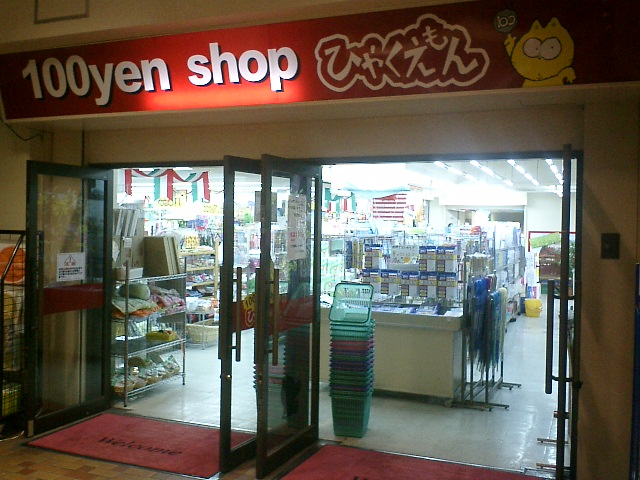
100-Emon at Kohnoike, Higashiōsaka, Osaka

100-yen shops (100円ショップ, hyaku-en shoppu) are common Japanese shops. Stocking a variety of items such as decorations, stationery, cup noodles, slippers, containers, batteries, spoons and bowls, electronics, each item is priced at precisely 100 yen, which is considered attractive to Japanese consumers because it can be paid for with a single 100-yen coin. However, the current Japanese consumption tax of 8% (food and drinks) or 10% (other items) is also added, making a 100-yen purchase actually cost 108 or 110 yen. Larger items, like furniture and tools, may also cost more yet are still relatively affordable, usually costing less than 1000 yen and have their separate price marked directly on the product.

The four major chains are Daiso, Seria, Watts, and Can Do, which combined have over 5,500 locations across Japan as of 2012. A variation of the 100-yen shops are 99-yen shops. Daiei also operates 88-yen stores. Some shops, such as Lawson 100, specialize in certain items, such as groceries or natural goods, but this is less common than the variety store model.

As of 2018, Daiso has over 2,800 stores throughout Japan, with 20-30 new stores opening every month. One of the largest 100-yen shops is the Daiso in the Tokyo neighborhood of Harajuku. It spans four stories and over 10,500 square feet (980 m^{2}).

Similar shops have opened around other parts of Asia as well, some operated by Japanese companies such as Daiso, which now has branches in 25 countries outside of Japan. In Hong Kong, department stores have opened their own 10-dollar-shops (JPY140) to compete in the market, thus there are now "8-dollar-shops" (JPY110) in Hong Kong, in order to compete with those lower prices. Countries outside of Asia with Daiso stores include the U.S. and Canada.

100-yen shops are able to keep prices down by purchasing goods internationally and in bulk. These goods come from countries with lower production costs, namely China and Thailand.

== History ==
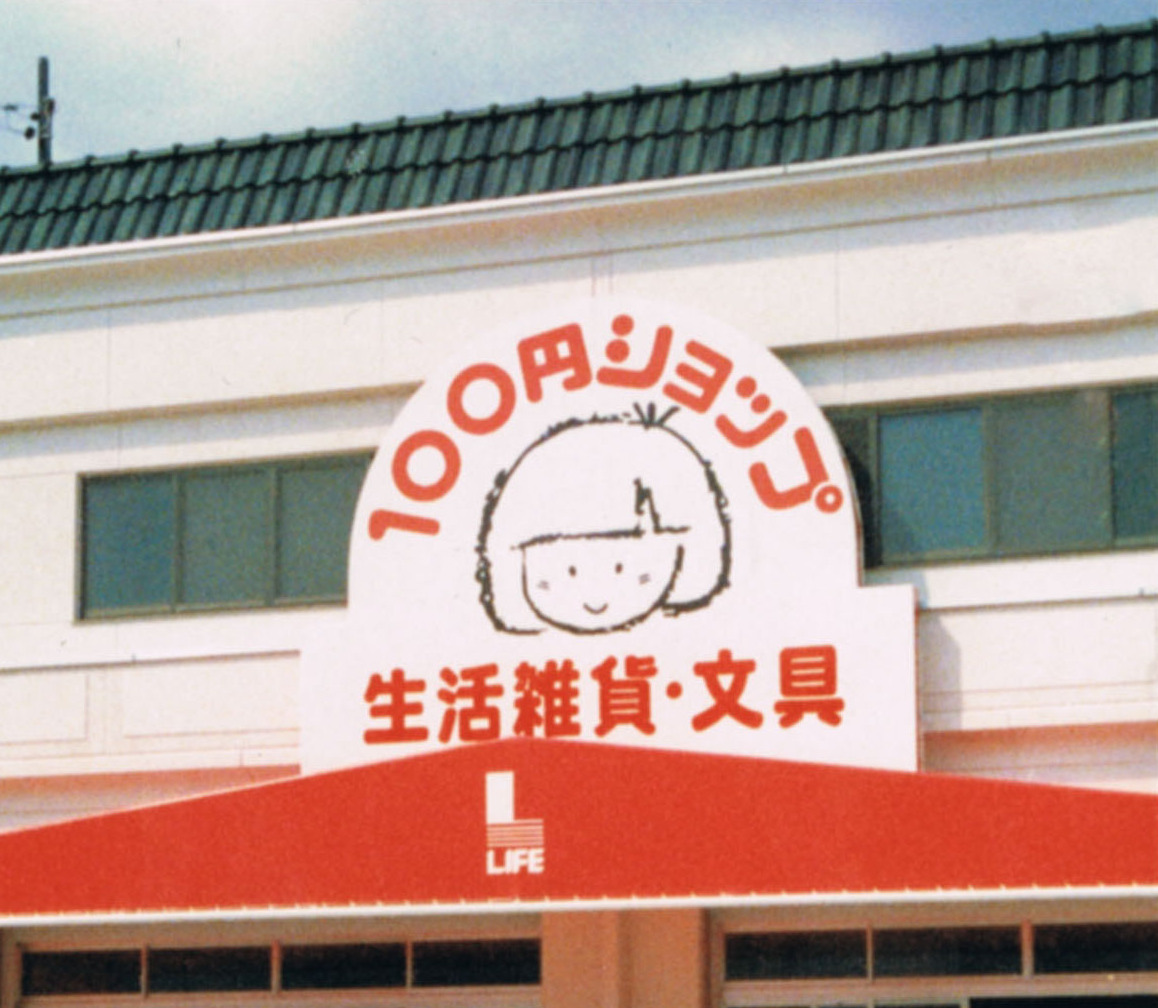
Japan's first 100-yen shop

The concept of stores that sell products at a uniformly low price dates back to the Edo period, when shops selling items for 19 mon and later 38 mon were popular. By the Meiji period, this had expanded to clothing stores and food stands, and stores selling only 1-yen items were not uncommon

The first 100-yen shop in its modern form was opened in 1985 in Kasugai, Aichi prefecture by Akira Matsubayashi, the founder of the company Life Standard. It was called '100-yen Shop' (100円ショップ). This model was eventually adopted by Hirotake Yano, the founder of Daiso Industries Co. Ltd., who opened the first Daiso store in 1991. Other major companies such as the Seria Co. Ltd. (株式会社セリア) were established on October 20, 1987, which was soon followed by the Can★Do Corporation (株式会社キャン★ドゥ) in December 1993.

Sales of 100-yen shops were "expected to top more than 100 billion yen" in the 1999 financial year.

== See also ==
- Bulk purchasing
- Variety store
  - Dollar Tree
  - Dollar General
- 100 yen coin
- General store
