= Daiso =

Japanese multinational variety store chain

Daiso Industries Co., Ltd.

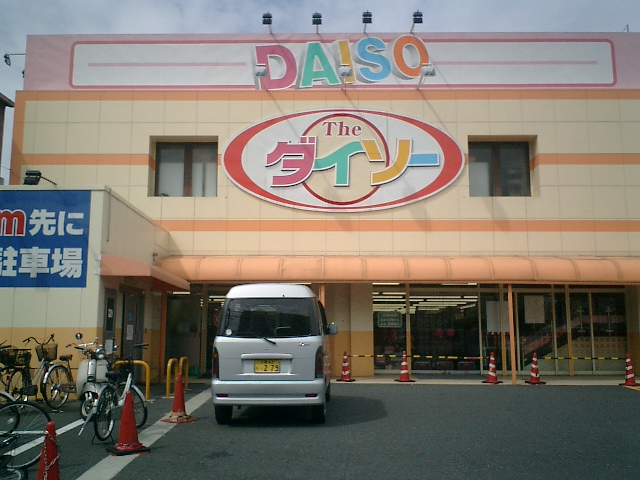
- A Daiso store in Japan
- Native name: 株式会社大創産業
- Romanized name: Daiso Sangyo
- Formerly: Yano Shoten
- Type: Privately held company
- Industry: Variety store
- Founded: December 1977 in Takamatsu, Kagawa, Japan
- Founder: Hirotake Yano
- Headquarters: Higashi Hiroshima-shi, Hiroshima, Japan
- Number of locations: 3,620 domestic; 1,900 overseas
- Area served: Around 25 countries and territories globally or worldwide, incl. Australia, Brazil, Canada, India, Japan, Mexico, New Zealand, Singapore, Thailand and the United States
- Key people: Seiji Yano (President)
- Number of employees: 745 (2025)
- Website: www.daiso-sangyo.co.jp (Japan); daisous.com (United States)

Daiso Industries Co., Ltd. (株式会社大創産業, Kabushiki gaisha Daisōsangyō; branded in katakana as ダイソー) is a franchise of 100-yen shops founded in Japan. Its headquarters are located in Higashihiroshima, Hiroshima Prefecture. Daiso has stores in around 25 countries and territories worldwide.

== History ==
Daiso was originally opened as a street vending shop with 100-yen products, known as "Yano Shoten", by Hirotake Yano in 1972. He later founded Daiso in 1977.

In March 2021, Daiso launched Standard Products, a retail format distinct from its traditional 100-yen shops. First opened in Tokyo, the brand focuses on minimalist household goods using sustainable materials, with a higher price point. It currently operates hundreds of stores globally and has expanded internationally to Australia, Canada, New Zealand, Singapore, Taiwan, Thailand, and the United States.

In June 2022, Crocs filed a lawsuit against Daiso, accusing them of selling foam clogs that allegedly resembled theirs and violating copyright trademarks.

== Business method ==
Daiso categorizes all of its own branded items using the morpheme za (ザ), the Japanese representation of the English word "the", plus a category. For example, za hanabi (ザ・花火) is the category for fireworks, and za purasuchikku (ザ・プラスチック) is the category for plastic items such as plastic buckets and trays.

In 2004, Daiso started selling items priced at multiples of 100 yen, such as 200, 300, 400 and 500 yen.

== Locations ==
Daiso has around 3,620 stores in Japan, and around 1,900 stores overseas in Australia, Bahrain, Brazil, Brunei, Cambodia, Canada, Hong Kong, India, Indonesia, Israel, Laos, Kuwait, Macau, Malaysia, Mexico, Mongolia, Myanmar, New Zealand, Oman, the Philippines, Qatar, Saudi Arabia, Singapore, Taiwan, Thailand, the United Arab Emirates, the United States, and Vietnam. The Hong Kong branch is operated by Aeon. The Korean branch was fully acquired in 2023 by AsungHMP. However, the same year, Daiso lost its Chinese branch.

Numbers of Daiso stores as of 2026:

Asia

- Japan: 3,620
- Thailand: 138
- Philippines: 100
- Taiwan: 87
- United Arab Emirates: 48
- Malaysia: 39
- Hong Kong: 34 (Retail name is Living Plaza by AEON, 3 DAISO)
- Singapore: 32
- Mongolia: 17
- Indonesia: 12
- Macau: 12
- Saudi Arabia: 6
- Myanmar: 5
- Qatar: 5
- Vietnam: 5
- Kuwait: 4
- Cambodia: 6
- Israel: 3
- Bahrain: 2
- India: 2
- Laos: 2
- Brunei: 2
- Oman: 1

Americas

- Brazil: 176
- United States: 88
- Mexico: 11
- Canada: 4

Oceania

- Australia: 41
- New Zealand: 4

=== Australia ===
The first Daiso store opened up in Abbotsford, Victoria in 2010, selling thousands of items at a flat rate of $2.80. Since then it has expanded to 13 stores in New South Wales, 14 in Queensland, three in South Australia, 12 in Victoria and two in Perth (at Westfield Carousel and Lakeside Joondalup). The stores range from 209 m^{2} (2,250 sq ft) to 1,000 m^{2} (11,000 sq ft) (Midtown Plaza, Melbourne store), which is currently the largest in Australia. Almost every item is AUD $3.30, or US$2.33, except for a small range of products (5% of total range) that is sold at varying prices from $3 to $15.

In June 2017, Daiso was forced by the Australian Competition & Consumer Commission to recall 165 products in Australia. These included toys which could pose a choking hazard or injury and beauty products with unknown ingredients.

=== Bahrain ===
Daiso's main store in Bahrain is located at Dasman Center, Manama, and spans two floors. It has been in operation since 2005. Daiso also has a smaller outlet at Ramli Mall, A'ali. As of 2007, most products cost BHD 0.600, or US$1.58.

=== Brazil ===
Daiso launched in Brazil in 2012, in the heart of São Paulo on Rua Direita and a modest distribution center in Riacho Grande, São Bernardo do Campo. The entry into Brazil was pioneering, aiming to reach the market of Latin America.

By November 2025 Daiso had 176 branches in the country, 49 alone in São Paulo city and state, as well as in the metro areas of Rio de Janeiro, Belo Horizonte, Brasília, Curitiba, Teresina, Porto Velho, Florianópolis, Vitória, São Luís and Belém.

=== Brunei ===
Daiso's first location in the sultanate opened on July 1, 2024, at Rimba Point, a shopping centre in Kampong Rimba, followed by its second branch in May 2026 in Gadong.

=== Canada ===
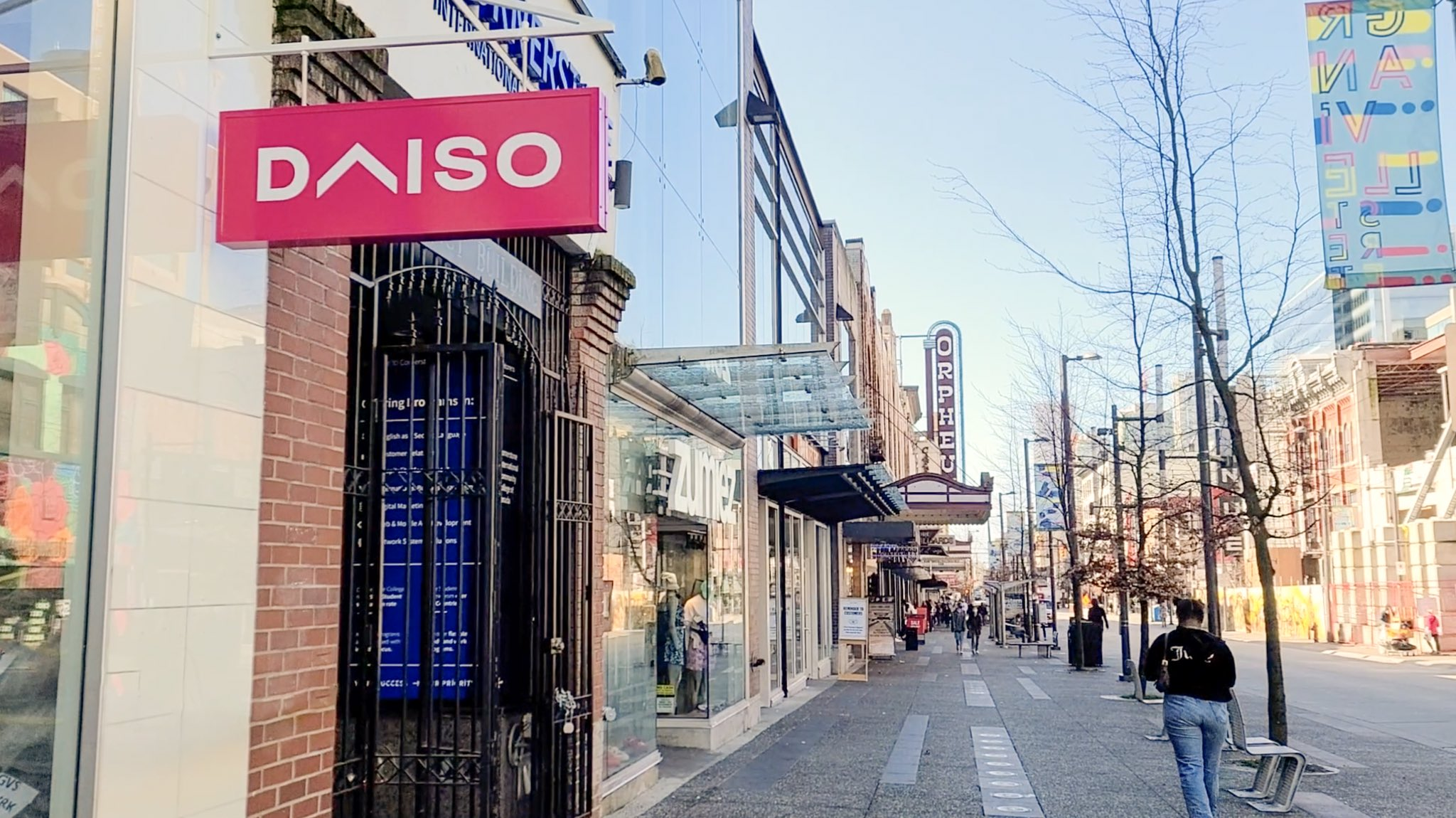
Daiso store on Granville Street in Vancouver, British Columbia

Daiso opened its first corporate Canadian store on Granville Street in downtown Vancouver, British Columbia in April 2021, with plans to expand nationally. With the opening of its Surrey location in March 2023, there are now four stores within Canada.

A franchise store, owned by Fairchild Group, was operated in Richmond, British Columbia from 2003 to 2019, when it was rebranded under Fairchild's Oomomo banner. Oomomo has continued to sell some Daiso products, but this supply will be discontinued as Daiso expands.

=== Cambodia ===
There are three Daiso Japan locations in Cambodia. All products are priced at about US$1.90. As of 2018, its new name in Cambodia is "DAISO JAPAN Life Coordinates Store".

=== Malaysia ===
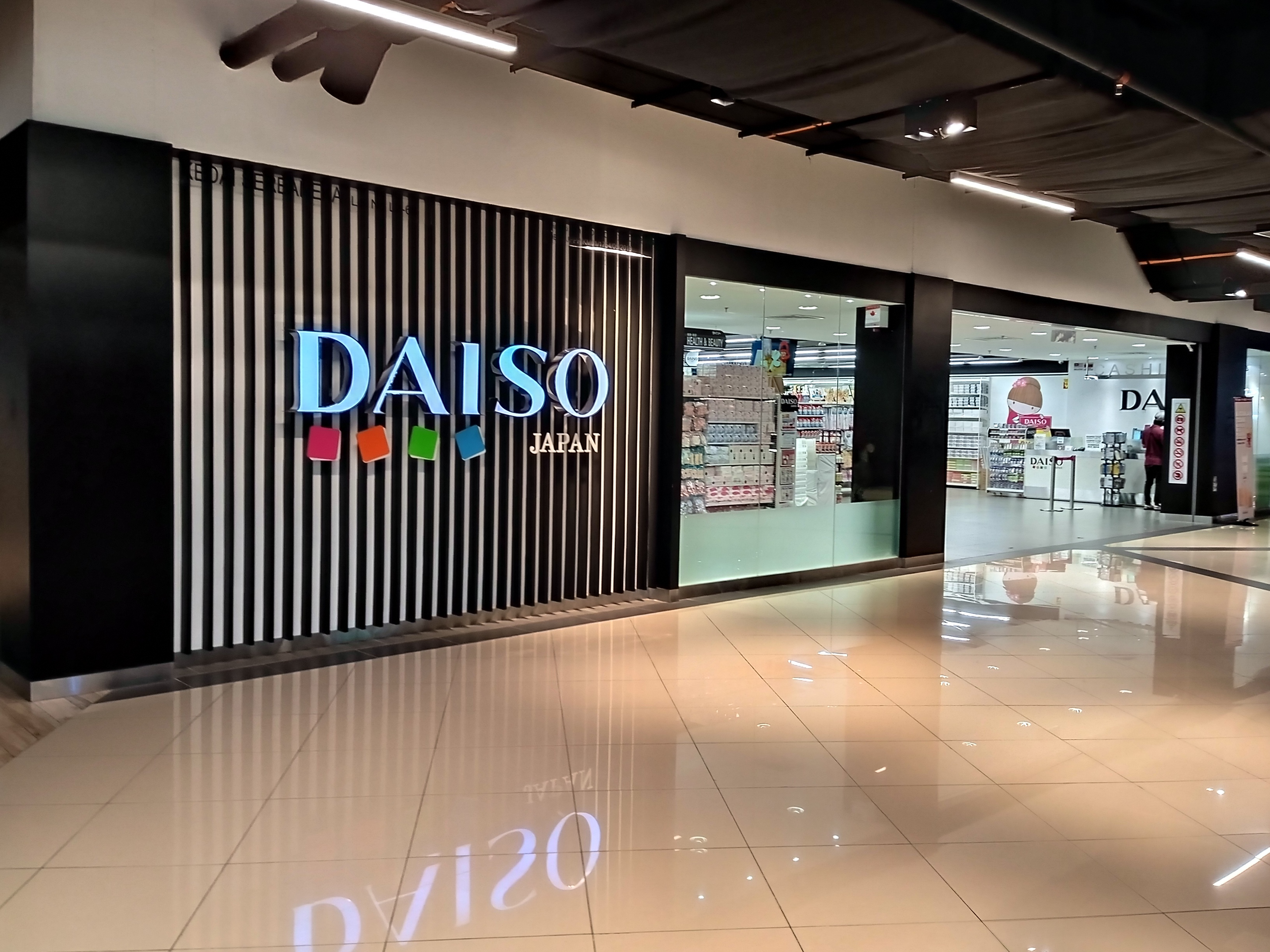
Daiso in Malaysia

All products are priced at RM 5.90, or US$1.43 GST-inclusive. The price increase from RM 5.30 to the current price was effective from March 1, 2017. The price was temporarily reduced to RM 5.57 when GST was removed in Malaysia, but it returned to RM 5.90 when SST (Sales and Services Tax) became effective on September 1, 2018.

=== Singapore ===
There are 32 Daiso stores in Singapore, together with 12 Threeppy stores and 3 Standard Products stores. Minimum pricing is $2.18, followed by 14 tiered increments. The first and largest flagship Daiso store is located at IMM.

=== South Korea ===
Daiso Korea owns 1,150 stores across the country, established in 1992 as the Daiso-Asung Corporation. Working in cooperation with Daiso Japan from 2001 to 2011, the chain has proliferated over the last ten years using a low cost / high quality strategy. Each store stocks over 30,000 items; most are under 1,000 won, or 0.75 US dollars. Daiso also has an online shopping mall that allows people to purchase the same items at home.

In 2011 and 2014, Daiso Korea announced that they were no longer part of Daiso Japan, claiming that Daiso Japan was trying to promote Liancourt Rocks as part of Japan. Daiso Korea confirmed that they were not selling the products Daiso Japan was selling and that they were acting as a different company.

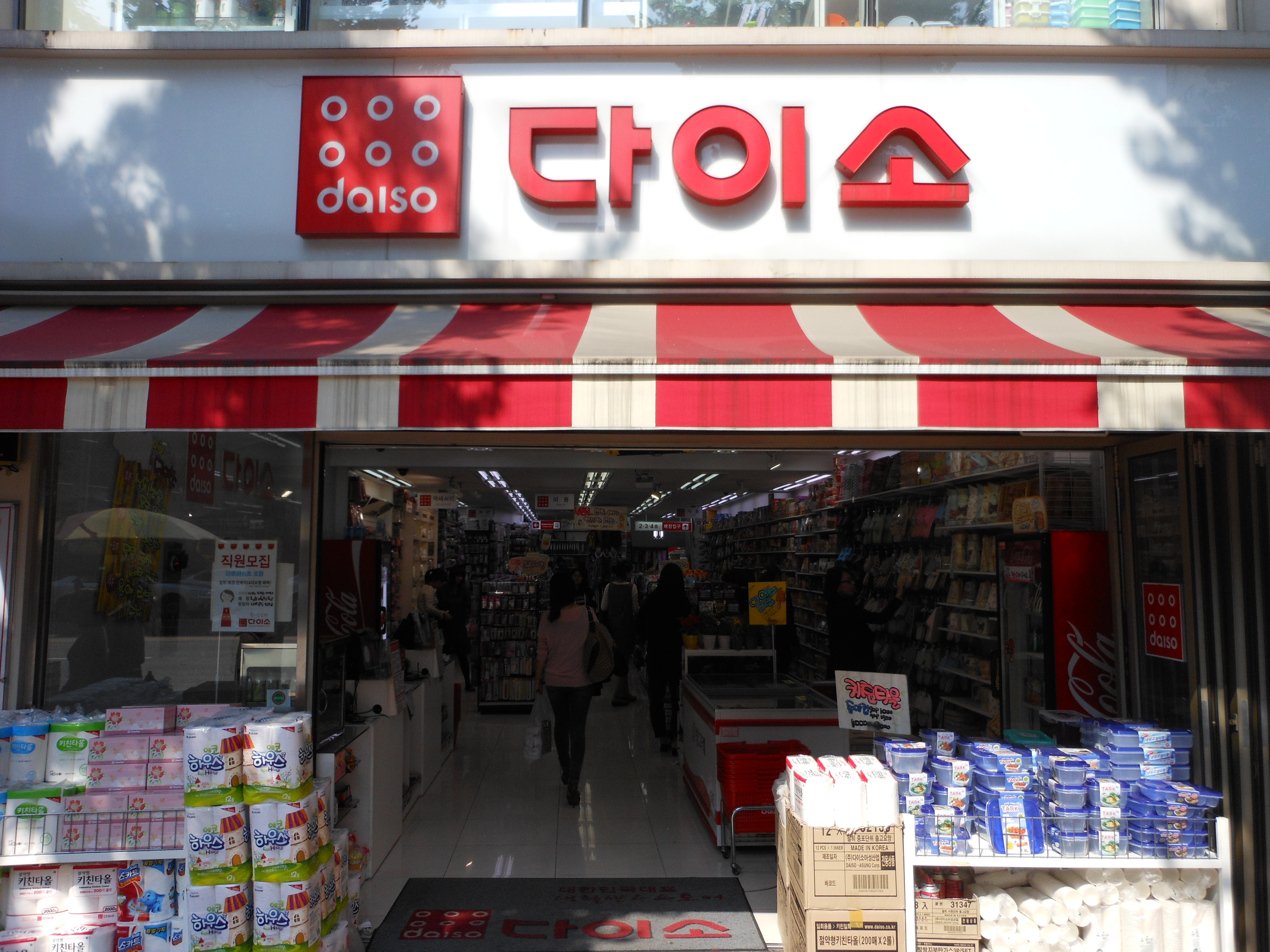
Daiso – South Korea

Daiso Korea has a unique logo compared to the rest of the Daiso Corporation. The modified logo is used inside the country to rebrand itself as a more modern company and to show its break-off from Daiso Japan. In December 2023, Daiso Korea announced that it had bought back its shares from Daiso Japan (34.21% stake reportedly worth around 500 billion won), effectively making it fully Korean-owned.

=== Taiwan ===
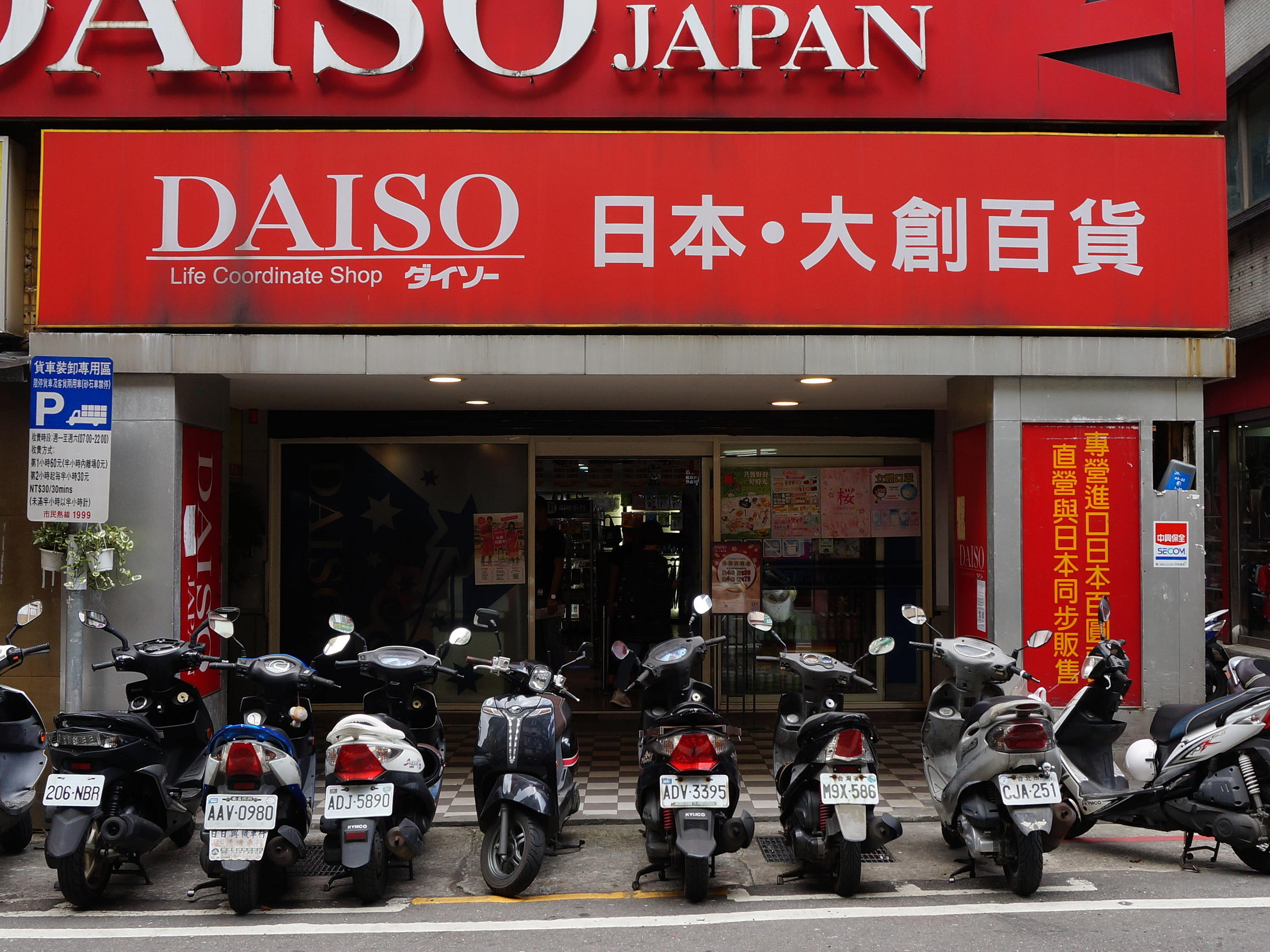
Daiso in Keelung

In May 2001, the Japanese company Daiso Industries established a joint venture in Taiwan, forming Daiso Taiwan Co., Ltd. The company's mission was to provide Taiwanese consumers with affordable yet high-quality shopping experiences. Its business focused on importing 100-yen products from Japan, with retail outlets gradually expanding across Taiwan. By August 2024, Daiso Taiwan had grown to operate 80 stores nationwide.

Following the Fukushima nuclear disaster in 2011, Taiwan imposed a ban on food imports from five Japanese prefectures: Fukushima, Ibaraki, Gunma, Tochigi, and Chiba. However, in 2015, Taiwan's Food and Drug Administration discovered that Daiso Taiwan had falsified Chinese labels to conceal the original origins of 13 food items from these restricted areas, involving over 13,000 products. These items were intercepted during border inspections and did not reach the market. As a penalty, Taiwan's Bureau of Foreign Trade imposed a six-month ban on Daiso Taiwan's import activities and fined the company NT$3 million.

In May 2018, during its six-month import ban, Daiso Taiwan was found to have altered transaction dates on trade documents and illegally used 694 forged import permits to bring in 2,067 metric tons of goods—amounting to 319 shipping containers. The company applied for special import permits under false pretenses. As a result, the Bureau of Foreign Trade fined Daiso Taiwan NT$41.64 million, revoked its import permits, and prohibited the company from engaging in import or export activities for two years.

=== United States ===
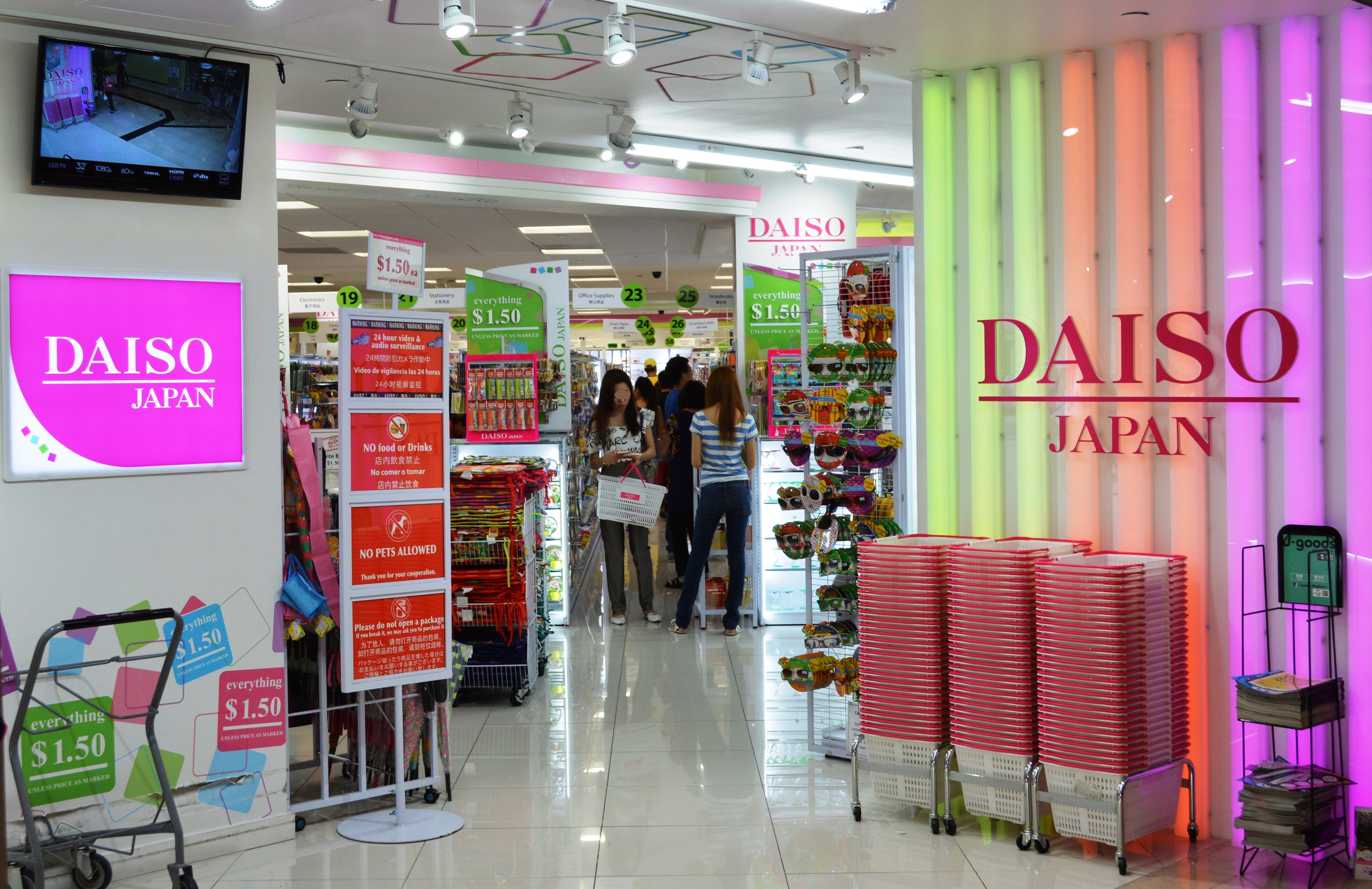
Daiso in San Gabriel, California

On October 2, 2005, the first Daiso store in the United States opened at Alderwood Mall in Lynnwood, near Seattle, Washington. This store was much smaller at only 442 square meters (approx. 4,750 square feet), and items were originally priced at $1, $1.50, and $2 (all USD). The inventory was expanded to include packaged food and items priced up to $8, though most items remained at the $1.50 minimum until a 25-cent increase in 2022. The Alderwood store was moved to a new mall location in 2015 and off-site in 2017.

As of 2025, there are over 150 stores in the continental United States, operated by Daiso US. The stores are in Arizona, Arkansas, California, Colorado, Kansas, Minnesota, Missouri, Nevada, New Jersey, New Mexico, New York, Oklahoma, Tennessee, Texas, Oregon, and Washington. The largest U.S. Daiso is in Union City, California, with 17,760 square feet (1,650 m^{2}) of floor space; it opened on August 8, 2007.
