= Shimonoseki Station =

Railway station in Shimonoseki, Yamaguchi Prefecture, Japan

JA 53 Shimonoseki Station 下関駅
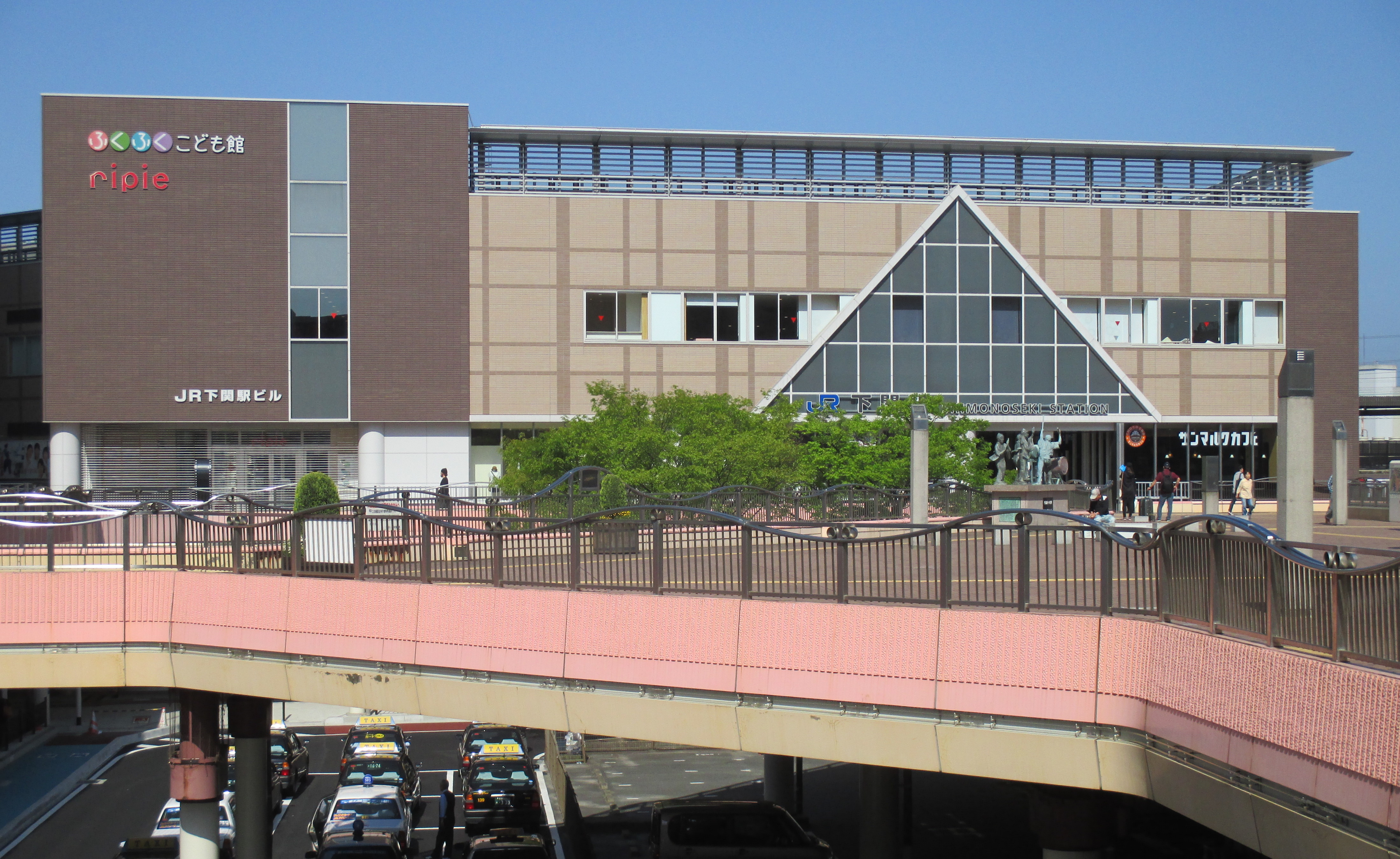
- Shimonoseki Station, May 2015

General information
- Location: 4-3-1 Takezakichō, Shimonoseki-shi, Yamaguchi-ken 750-0025; Japan
- Coordinates: 33°57′1.46″N 130°55′23.1″E
- Owner: West Japan Railway Company
- Operator: JR West
- Lines: San'yō Line (JR West); San'yō Line (JR Kyushu); San'in Main Line (JR West)
- Distance: 528.1 km (328.1 miles) from Kobe
- Platforms: 3 island platforms
- Tracks: 10
- Train operators: JR West; JR Kyushu; Japan Freight Railway Company
- Connections: Bus stop

Construction
- Accessible: yes

Other information
- Status: Staffed (Midori no Madoguchi)
- Station code: JA-53
- Website: Official website

History
- Opened: 27 May 1901; 125 years ago
- Former names: Bakan (to 1902)

Passengers
- FY2020: 7225

Services
Preceding station	JR West	Following station
Terminus	San'in Main Line	Hatabu towards Masuda
Terminus	San'yō Line	Hatabu towards Iwakuni
Terminus	San'yō Line West Express Ginga	Shin-Shimonoseki towards Osaka
Preceding station	JR Kyushu	Following station
Moji JA 52 towards Kokura	San'yō Line	Terminus
Location
- Location within Yamaguchi Prefecture Location within Japan

Shimonoseki Station (下関駅, Shimonoseki-eki) is a passenger railway station located in the city of Shimonoseki, Yamaguchi Prefecture, Japan. It is operated by the West Japan Railway Company (JR West). The station is a freight depot of the Japan Freight Railway Company (JR Freight).

== Lines ==
Shimonoseki Station is served by the JR West San'yō Main Line and is located 528.1 kilometers from the terminus of the line at Kobe. It is also served by trains of the JR West San'in Main Line, whose trains all continue past the nominal terminus of that line at Hatabu and is located 677.3 kilometers from the opposing terminus of that line at Kyoto. The company boundary between JR West and JR Kyushu is at the west end of this station where there is an entrance signal from Moji, and trains on the San'yō Main Line past this station are under the control of the Kyushu Railway Company (JR Kyushu)

== Station layout ==
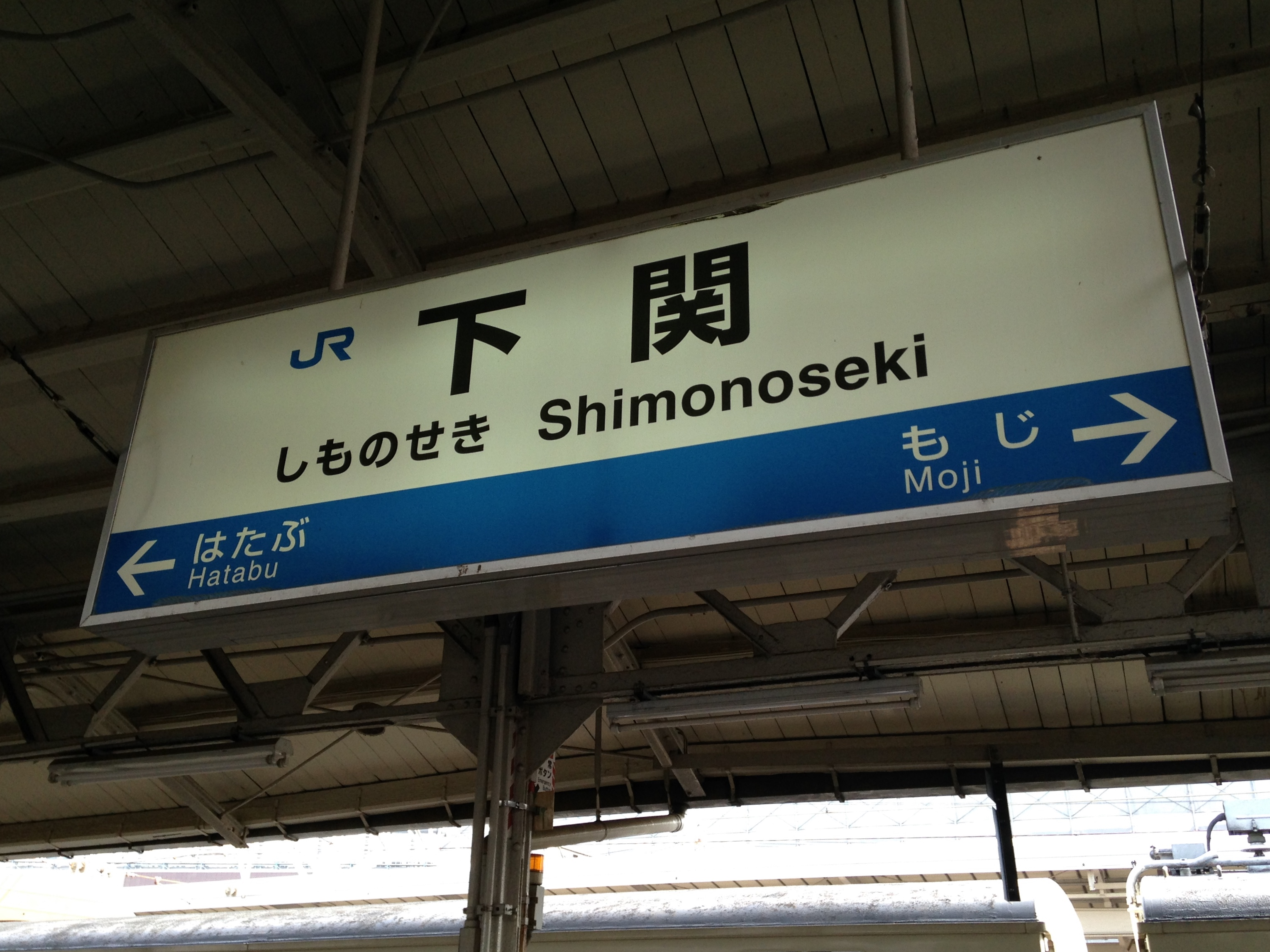
Station sign

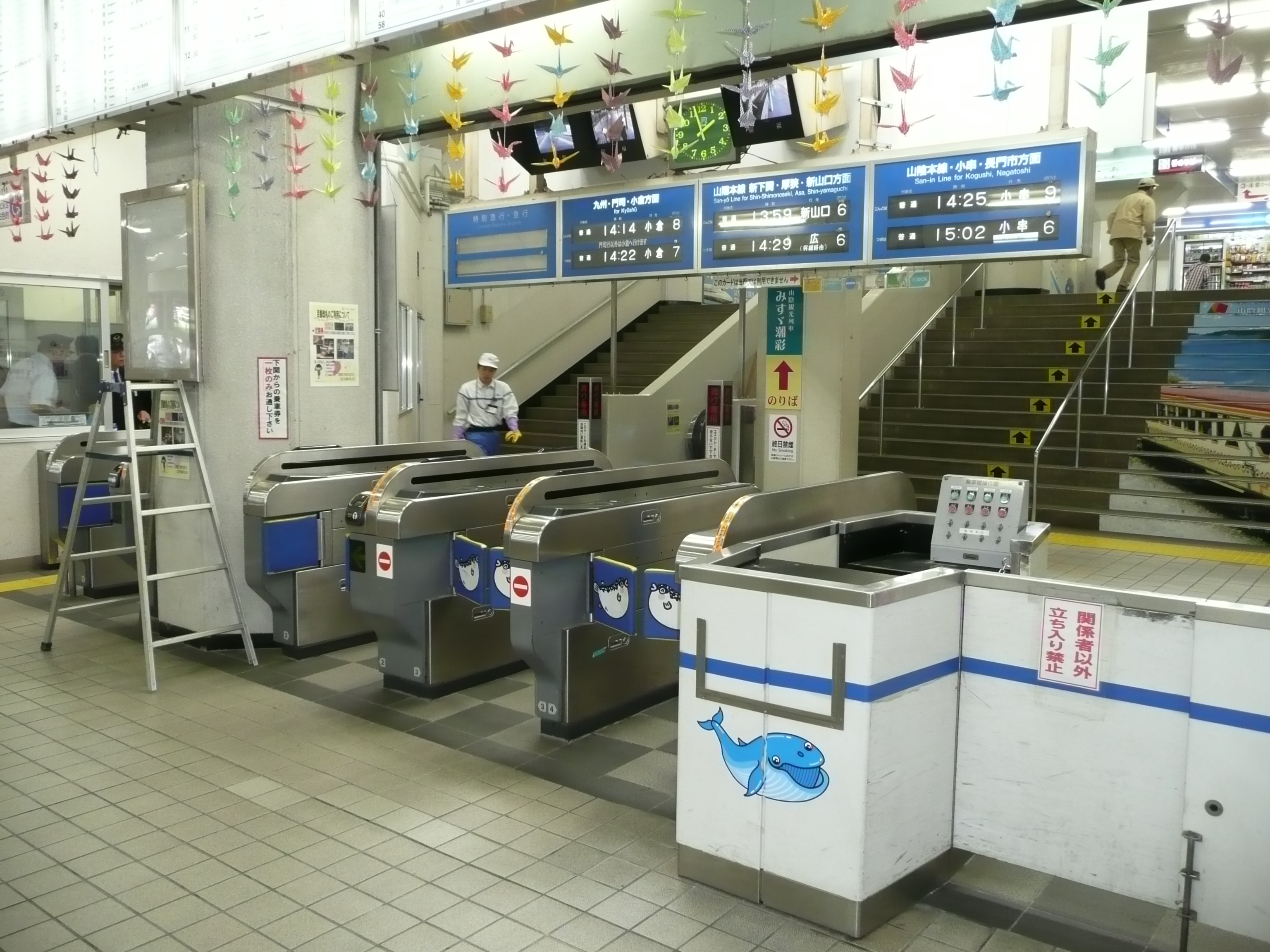
The ticket barriers

The station consists of two raised island platforms connected to a mezzanine level of the station building by the stairs/escalator near the north end of each platform. The station has a Midori no Madoguchi staffed ticket office.

== Platforms ==
3, 4	■ San'yō Line	<siding>
6	■ San'yō Line	for Shin-Yamaguchi and Hōfu
7, 8	■ San'yō Line	for trains to Kyushu
9	■ San'in Main Line	for Kogushi and Nagatoshi

Note: Platforms 1, 2, 5 and 10 do not have physical platforms.

== History ==
Shimonoseki Station opened on 27 May 1901 as Bakan Station (馬関駅) on the San'yō Railway about 700 meters east from its current location, but adjacent to the Kanmon Renrakusen (関門連絡船, Shimonoseki Moji Railway Ferry) . The station name was changed to Shimonoseki Station with the change in city name 1 June 1902. San'yō Railway ferry operations to Korea began from 11 September 1905. The San'yō Railway was railway nationalized in 1906 and the line renamed the San'yō Main Line in 1909. On 1 July 1942, the Kanmon Tunnel was opened. The station moved to its present location on 15 November 1942. With the privatization of the Japan National Railway (JNR) on 1 April 1987, the station came under the aegis of the West Japan railway Company (JR West).

On 29 September 1999, the Shimonoseki Station massacre occurred, with five deaths with ten injuries. On 7 January 2006, the main station building was destroyed by fire and a 74-year-old man was arrested for arson.

== Passenger statistics ==
In fiscal 2020, the station was used by an average of 7225 passengers daily.

== Surrounding area ==
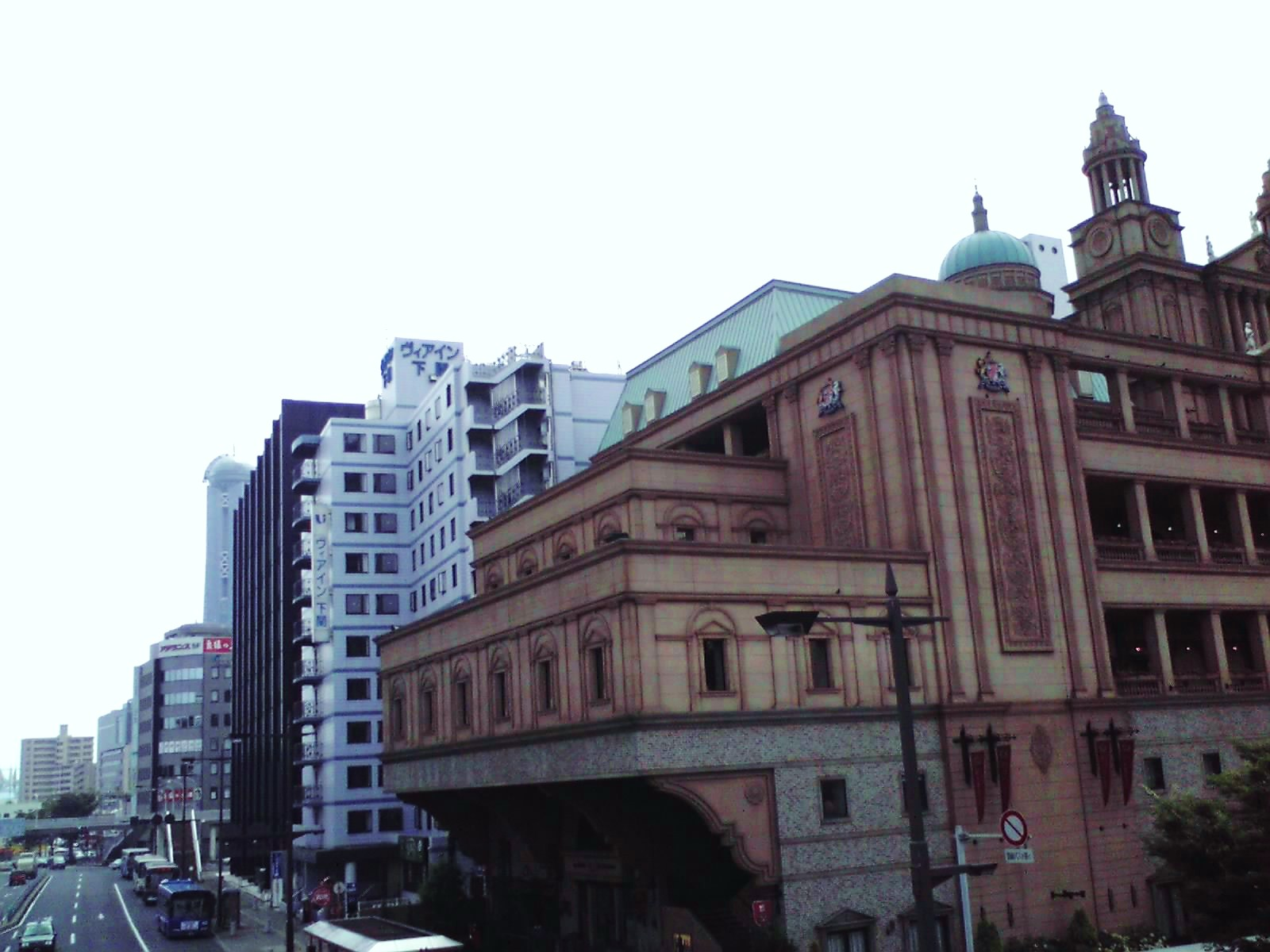
Takezaki-cho

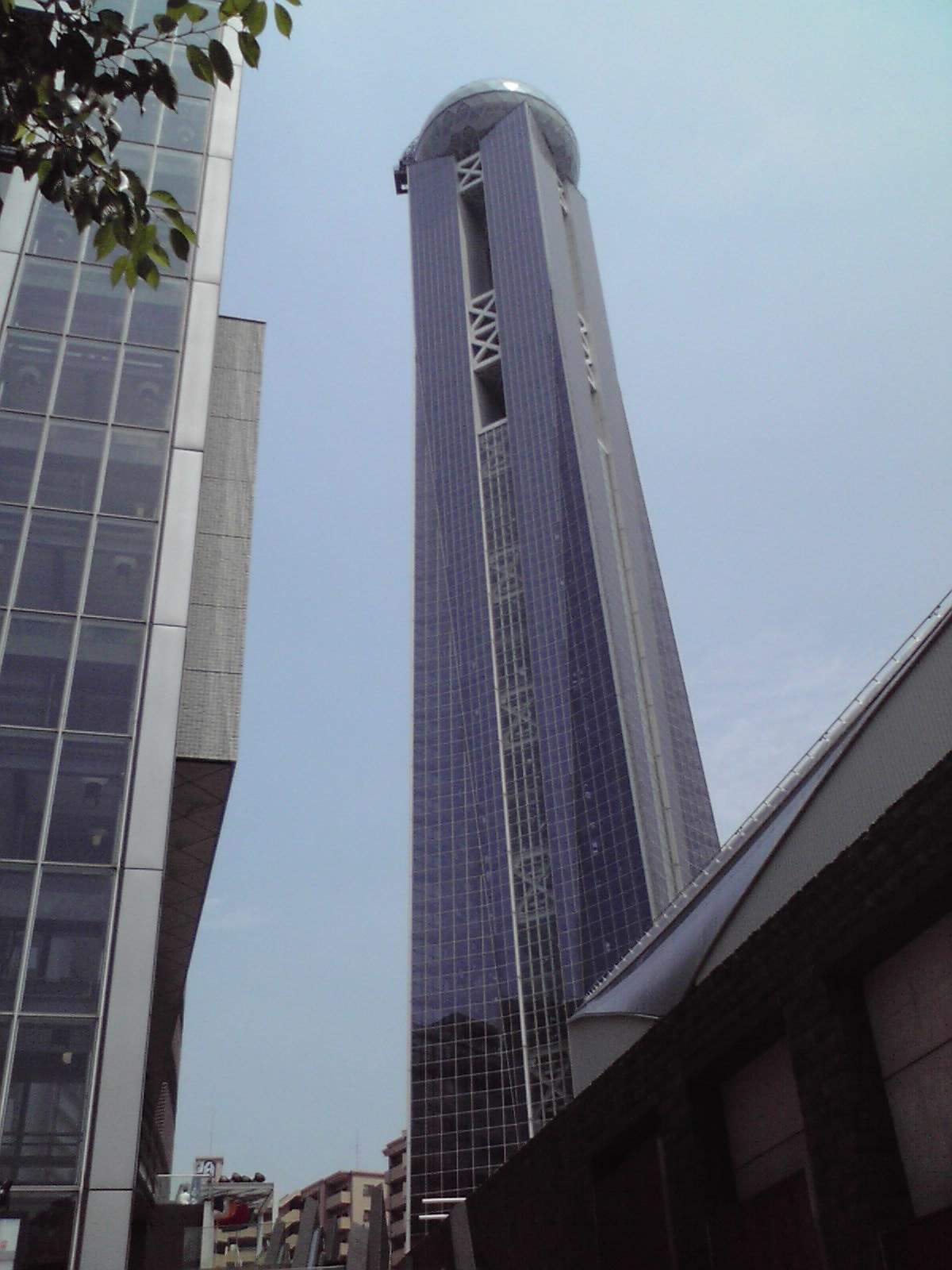
Kaikyo Yume Tower (153m)

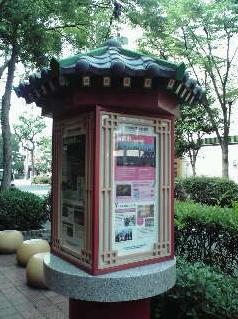
Green Mall (Koreatown)

=== JR Shimonoseki station and Buzenda area ===
Shops

- Sea Mall Shimonoseki (largest shopping center in West Japan when it was built)
  - Shimonoseki Daimaru (department store)
  - Wedding Hall
- Buzenda Shopping Street (the most famous downtown in Yamaguchi Prefecture)
- Green Mall shopping street (Korean Town )
- Nagato Market

Sightseeing

- Kaikyo Yume Tower (Kaikyo Messe Shimonoseki)
- Hiyoriyama Park

Hotels

- Shimonoseki Tokyu Inn
- Via Inn Shimonoseki
- Shimonoseki Eki-nishi Washington Hotel Plaza
- Toyoko Inn Shimonoseki-eki Higashi-guchi
- Shimonoseki Station Hotel
- Green Hotel Shimonoseki
- Hotel Wing International Shimonoseki
- Hotel 38th Shimonoseki
- Prince Hotel Shimonoseki

Others

- Shimonoseki Port (Foreign Access Zone)
- Shimonoseki Port International Terminal
- Shimonoseki Fishing Port
- Shimonoseki Citizen hall

=== Karato ===
Shops

- SunLive Karato(Shopping center)
- Karato shopping street
- Kamon Wharf (fresh fish shop and restaurant, etc.)

Sightseeing

- Kaikyokan (Aquarium)
- Mt. Hinoyama (268.2m)
- Karato Market (Fresh fish shop etc.)
- Former British Consulate (built in 1906)
- Former Akita Company Building (built in 1915)
- Nabe-cho Post Office (built in 1900)
- Akama Shrine(built in 1191)
- Kameyama Hachimangu Shrine (built in 859)
- Kanmon Straits (Kanmonkyo Bridge)
- Dan-no-ura (Battle of Dan-no-ura)

Hotels

- Shimonoseki Grand Hotel
- Karato Central Hotel
- Kaikyo View Shimonoseki
- Shunpanro
- Tokyo Dai-ichi Hotel Shimonoseki
- Shimonoseki City Hinoyama Youth Hostel

Others

- Shimonoseki City Hall
- Arcaport development area

== Transportation ==
=== Ferries from Shimonoseki Port International Terminal ===
- The Kanpu ferry to Busan in South Korea regularly.
- The Orient ferry to Qingdao in China regularly.
- The Orient ferry to Shanghai in China regularly.

=== Bus ===
- Bus company (A loop-line bus in the city.) : Sanden Kohtsu Co., Ltd.
  - Shimonoseki Station Bus Terminal : Intercity bus services (arrival and departure at Shimonoseki Station Bus Terminal) go to the following destinations: Osaka, Kobe, Fukuoka, Kitakyushu Airport, etc.

== See also ==
- List of railway stations in Japan
- Shimonoseki
- Buzenda
