= Hirotake Yano =

Japanese businessman (1943–2024)

- Born: Koro Kurihara; April 19, 1943; Beijing, China
- Died: February 12, 2024 (aged 80); Higashihiroshima, Japan
- Occupation: Businessman

Hirotake Yano (矢野 博丈; April 19, 1943 – February 12, 2024) was a Japanese businessman who was the founder of the Daiso discount retail chain.

== Biography ==
Hirotake Yano was born Koro Kurihara in Beijing, China in 1943. He came from a family of five brothers and three sisters. His father and two brothers were doctors.

Yano's family moved back to his father's home town Higashi-Hiroshima when World War II ended. Yano took up boxing while at Hiroshima Kokutaiji High School in Hiroshima, and became a Hiroshima Prefectural representative. He was chosen for an Olympic athletes preparation camp, where one of his opponents was Tetsuro Kawai, an amateur featherweight champion and contender for the Tokyo Olympics in 1964.

Yano's father would not send him to university unless he studied science or engineering-related subjects which would lead to a good job, so he could not apply for a sports scholarship. He failed entrance examinations for 16 different universities, and then was accepted into Chuo University's night school civil engineering department. Yano graduated from the Faculty of Science and Engineering at Chuo University in 1967 with a bachelor's degree majoring in civil engineering, but struggled to find employment.

Yano married Katsuyo Yano while he was a student. He adopted his wife's surname because he thought it sounded better than Kurihara for business transactions. With difficulties finding employment after graduation, Yano and his wife took over her father's aquaculture business rearing yellowtail fish. However, the business was unsuccessful and Yano became bankrupt within three years. Yano, his wife and young son escaped Hiroshima and went to Tokyo.

Yano then tried many different menial jobs. He sold encyclopaedias for three months until he realised he was not good at it. He worked in a bowling alley and then in a cardboard and paper recycling company which enabled him to repay some of his debts. The family moved back to Hiroshima and Yano started working for a mobile merchandiser. This eventually led to the formation of the Daiso company.

Yano died on February 12, 2024, at the age of 80.

== Daiso ==
Yano established his first company named Yano Shoten (Yano Store) in 1972 when he was 29, selling items from the back of a truck and displaying his goods on a mobile wooden stand.

In 1977 he changed the company name to Daiso Industries and introduced the universal price of ¥100. Yano has stated that having to tag many different products with different prices was becoming too time-consuming for him and his wife, so they just decided to make things simpler by pricing every item at ¥100. Yano was one of the first retailers in Japan to adopt a single-price model. This coincided with the start of a shift in Japanese consumer culture after the oil crisis and economic downturn of the mid-1970s, leading to success for the company.

In 1987 Yano developed the 100 Yen Daiso company and in 1991 the company opened its first directly managed shop in permanent premises, in Takamatsu City, Kagawa Prefecture.

Yano was noted for his live-for-the-moment attitude, which comes from his varied experiences and failures, particularly the bankruptcy of his father-in-law's fishery, which Yano took over in his 20s. In 2001 he stated: "I have failed many times, and I thought that whatever I tried, nothing was going to succeed. [...] But I kept going because I thought there was nothing else I could do." Yano was also quoted in 2001 as saying: "I am not a smart person. I have no talent. I just try my best and work hard to sell my products." In 2016 Yano said that he doesn't see himself as a "cool" or "modern" manager. He said he doesn't have any clear vision or strategy, and that he just likes to try things out and makes decisions based on gut instinct.

Yano's busy lifestyle led to him suffering a stroke in 2018. In 2018 Yano named his younger son Seiji Yano as president of Daiso, stating that he had become too old and that "the times and myself do not match". Yano noted that the retaiI industry makes heavy use of technology and computing but said he did not have the skills to do this. In 2019 he won the EY Entrepreneur of the Year national award for Japan.
