= Shin-Shimonoseki Station =

Railway station in Shimonoseki, Yamaguchi Prefecture, Japan

Shin-Shimonoseki Station 新下関駅
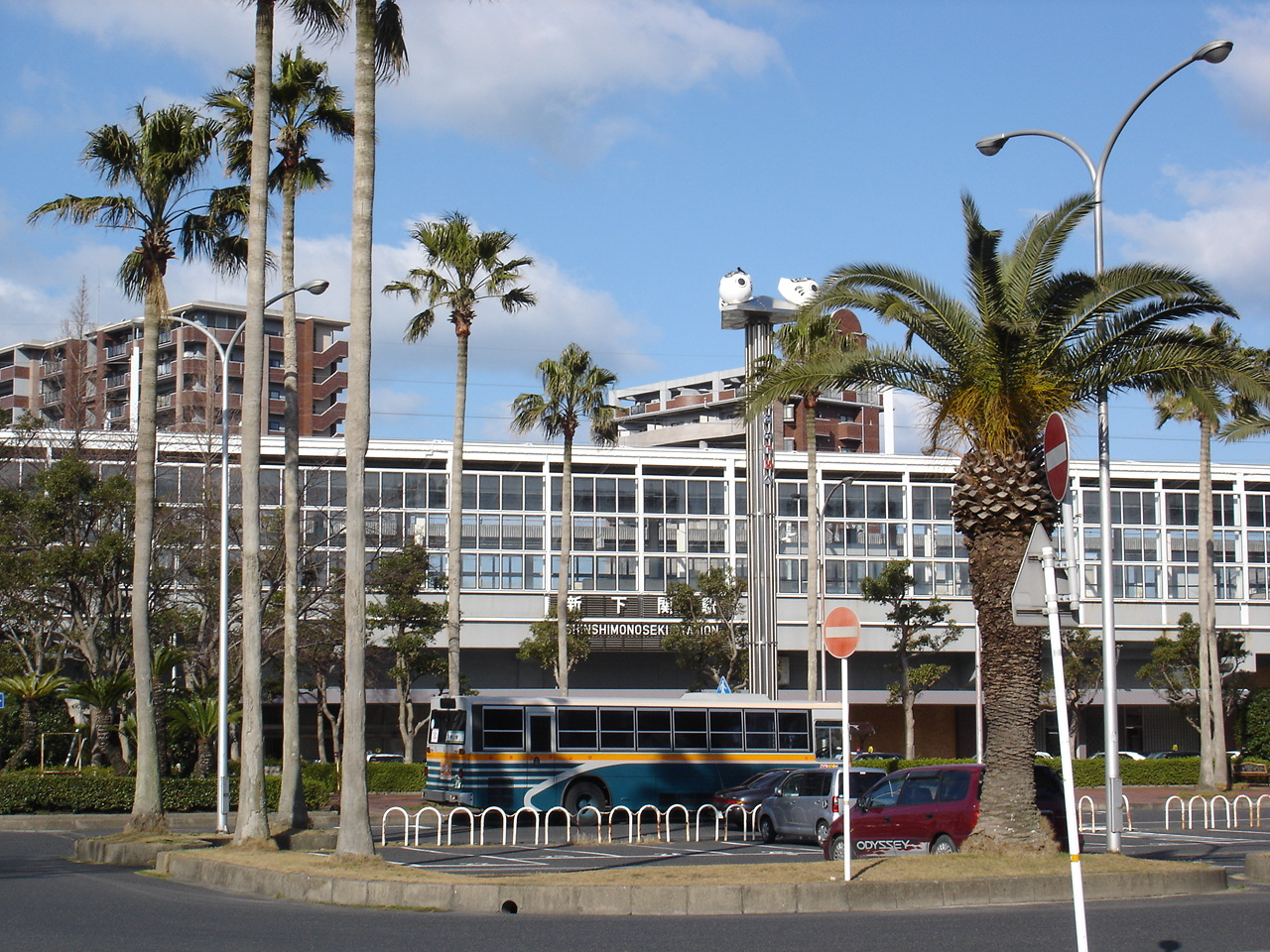
- Shin-Shimonoseki Station East exit

General information
- Location: 1-11-1 Akineminami-machi, Shimonoseki-shi, Yamaguchi-ken 751-0872; Japan
- Coordinates: 34°0′20.5″N 130°56′55.7″E
- Owner: West Japan Railway Company
- Operator: West Japan Railway Company Japan Freight Railway Company
- Lines: San'yō Shinkansen; San'yō Line
- Distance: 1,088.7 km (676.5 miles) from Tokyo
- Platforms: 4 side + 1 island platforms
- Connections: Bus stop

Construction
- Structure type: Elevated (Shinkansen); At grade (Conventional line)
- Accessible: Yes

Other information
- Status: Staffed (Midori no Madoguchi)
- Website: Official website

History
- Opened: 27 May 1901
- Former names: Ichinomiya (to 1916), Nagato-Ichinomiya (to 1975)

Passengers
- 2020: 3515 daily (boarding only)

Services
Preceding station	JR West	Following station
Kokura towards Hakata	San'yō Shinkansen Sakura	Shin-Yamaguchi towards Shin-Ōsaka
Kokura towards Hakata	San'yō Shinkansen Hikari	Shin-Yamaguchi towards Shin-Ōsaka
Kokura towards Hakata or Hakataminami	San'yō Shinkansen Kodama	Asa towards Shin-Ōsaka
Location
- Location within Yamaguchi Prefecture Location within Japan

Shin-Shimonoseki Station (Japanese: 新下関駅, Hepburn: Shin-Shimonoseki-eki; lit. 'New Shimonoseki Station') is a passenger railway station located in the city of Shimonoseki, Yamaguchi Prefecture, Japan. It is operated by the West Japan Railway Company (JR West). It is also a freight depot for the Japan Freight Railway Company (JR Freight)

== Lines ==
Shin-Shimonoseki Station is served by the San'yō Shinkansen and is 536.1 kilometers from Shin-Osaka and 1088.7 km from Tokyo. It is also served San'yō Main Line, and is located 520.9 kilometers from the terminus of the line at Kobe and is the southern terminus of the 85.1 kilometer Fukuen Line to Miyoshi.

== Station layout ==
The San'yō Shinkansen has one island platform and one side platform with a prepared track layer and two through tracks without platforms. These tracks are elevated. The San'yō Main Line has two side platforms and one siding track without platform on the ground level, with the tracks at a right angle to the elevated Shinkansen tracks. The station has a Midori no Madoguchi staffed ticket office.

=== Platforms ===
1, 2	■ San'yō Shinkansen	for Kokura and Hakata
3	■ San'yō Shinkansen	for Hiroshima, Shin-Osaka and Tokyo
4	■ San'yō Line	for Asa and Shin-Yamaguchi
6	■ San'yō Line	for Shimonoseki

Note: Track 5 has no platform.

== History ==
Shin-Shimonoseki Station opened on 27 May 1901 as Ichinomiya Station (一ノ宮駅) when the line was extended from Asa Station to Bakan Station (present-day Shimonoseki Station) The San'yō Railway was railway nationalized in 1906 and the line renamed the San'yō Main Line in 1909. The station was renamed Nagato Ichinomiya Station (長門一宮駅) on 1 January 1916. The station was moved to its present location on 19 November 1928, per a route change of the San'yō Main Line between Chōfu and Shimonoseki. The Shinkansen began operations on 10 March 1975 and the station was renamed to its present name. With the privatization of the Japan National Railway (JNR) on 1 April 1987, the station came under the aegis of the West Japan railway Company (JR West).

== Passenger statistics ==
In fiscal 2019, the station was used by an average of 3515 passengers daily.

== Surrounding area ==
- Shimonoseki City Hall Katsuyama Branch
- University of East Asia
- Shimonoseki International High School
- Shimonoseki Municipal Katsuyama Junior High School
- Sumiyoshi Shrine (Shimonoseki)

== See also ==
- List of railway stations in Japan
