= List of mergers in Yamaguchi Prefecture =

Here is a list of mergers in Yamaguchi Prefecture, Japan since the Heisei era.

== Mergers from April 1, 1999 to Present ==
- On April 21, 2003 - the cities of Tokuyama and Shinnan'yō merged with the town of Kumage (from Kumage District), and the town of Kano (from Tsuno District) were merged to create the city of Shūnan. Tsuno District was dissolved as a result of this merger.
- On October 1, 2004 - the towns of Kuka, Ōshima, Tachibana and Tōwa (all from Ōshima District) were merged to create the town of Suō-Ōshima.
- On October 4, 2004 - the town of Yamato (from Kumage District) was merged into the expanded city of Hikari.
- On November 1, 2004 - the town of Kusunoki (from Asa District) was merged into the expanded city of Ube.
- On February 13, 2005 - the old city of Shimonoseki absorbed the towns of Hōhoku, Kikugawa, Toyoura and Toyota (all from Toyoura District) to create the new and expanded city of Shimonoseki. Toyoura District was dissolved as a result of this merger.
- On February 21, 2005 - the town of Ōbatake (from Kuga District) was merged into the expanded city of Yanai.
- On March 6, 2005 - the old city of Hagi absorbed the towns of Susa and Tamagawa, and the villages of Asahi, Fukue, Kawakami and Mutsumi (all from Abu District) to create the new and expanded city of Hagi.
- On March 22, 2005 - the old city of Nagato absorbed the towns of Heki, Misumi and Yuya (all from Ōtsu District) to create the new and expanded city of Nagato. Ōtsu District was dissolved as a result of this merger.
- On March 22, 2005 - the city of Onoda was merged with the town of San'yō (from Asa District) to create the city of San'yō-Onoda. Asa District was dissolved as a result of this merger.
- On October 1, 2005 - the old city of Yamaguchi (2nd generation) absorbed the town of Tokuji (from Saba District), and the towns of Aio, Ajisu and Ogōri (all from Yoshiki District) to create new and expanded city of Yamaguchi (3rd generation). Saba District and Yoshiki District were both dissolved as a result of this merger.
- On March 20, 2006 - the old city of Iwakuni absorbed the towns of Kuga, Mikawa, Miwa, Nishiki, Shūtō and Yū, and the village of Hongō (all from Kuga District) to create the new and expanded city of Iwakuni. There are no longer any villages in Yamaguchi Prefecture with this merger.
- On March 21, 2008 - the towns of Mitō and Shūhō (both from Mine District) were merged into the expanded city of Mine. Mine District was dissolved as a result of this merger.
- On January 16, 2010 - the town of Atō (from Abu District) was merged into the expanded city of Yamaguchi.
