= Seiryu =

Seiryu, Seiryū, or Seiryuu may refer to:

== Places ==
- Seiryu Miharashi Station, a railway station on the Nishikigawa Seiryū Line
- Seiryū-Shin-Iwakuni Station, is a railway station in Iwakuni, Yamaguchi
- Seiryū-ji, a Kōyasan Betsuin (affiliate temple) located in Aomori, Aomori Prefecture
- Gifu Seiryu Half Marathon, an annual half marathon road running competition
- Nishikigawa Seiryū Line, a Japanese railway line connecting Kawanishi and Nishikichō stations
- OKB Gifu Seiryu Arena, an arena in Gifu, Gifu, Japan

== People ==
- Seiryū Inoue (井上 青龍; 1931–1988), Japanese photographer
- Seiryū Uchi (内 星龍; born 2002), Japanese professional baseball player

== Characters ==
- Seiryū (Fushigi Yūgi), a character in Fushigi Yūgi anime
- Seiryū (YuYu Hakusho), a character in YuYu Hakusho anime
- Seiryū, the guardian of the East Gate of The Imperial Palace in Accel World

== Others ==
- Azure Dragon, a Chinese constellation symbol
- Seiryu, a cultivar of the Japanese maple
- Seiryu stone, a kind of stone popular in aquariums, especially for aquascaping
- JS Seiryū (SS-509), a Japanese Sōryū-class submarine
