= Mukuno Station =

Railway station in Iwakuni, Yamaguchi Prefecture, Japan

Mukuno Station 椋野駅
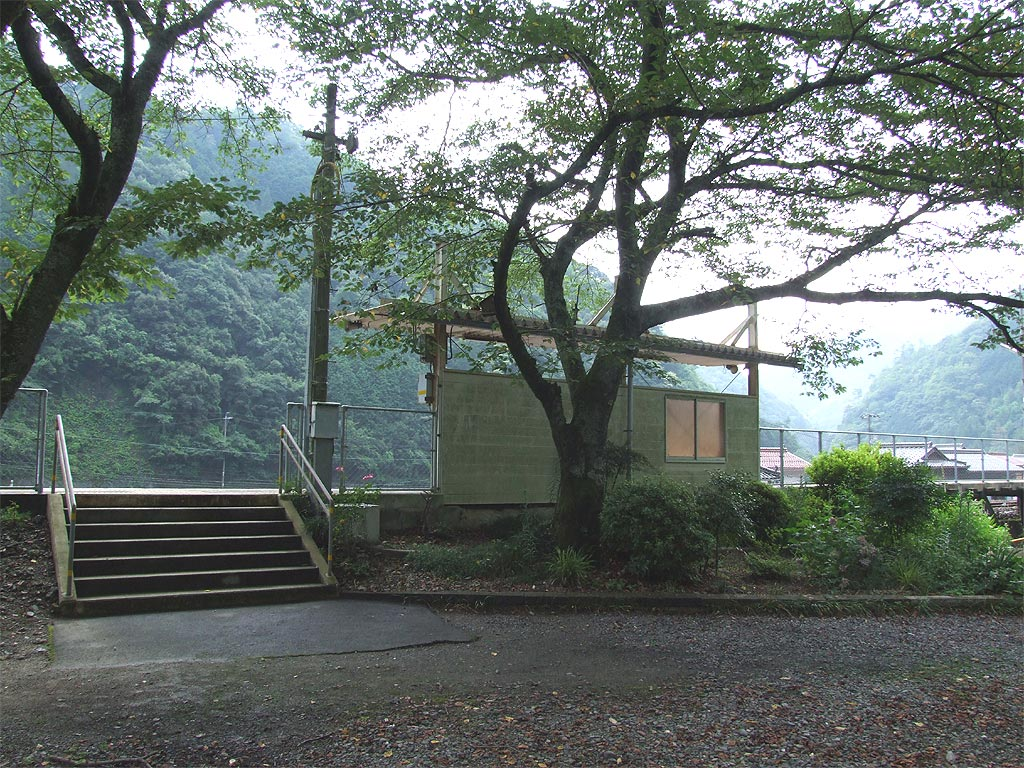
- Mukuno Station

General information
- Location: Mikawa-machi Naguwa, Iwakuni, Yamaguchi （山口県岩国市美川町南桑） Japan
- Coordinates: 34°11′37″N 132°02′01″E
- Operator: Nishikigawa Railway
- Line: Nishikigawa Seiryū Line
- Connections: Bus stop

History
- Opened: 1 November 1960

Passengers
- FY2011: 180 daily
Location

Mukuno Station (椋野駅, Mukuno-eki) is a railway station on the Seiryū Line in Iwakuni, Yamaguchi Prefecture, Japan. It is operated by the Nishikigawa Railway, a third-sector railway company.

== Lines ==
The station is served by the Seiryū Line and is located 17.7 km from the start of the line at Kawanishi.

== Adjacent stations ==
«	Service	»
Nishikigawa Railway
Nishikigawa Seiryū Line
Kita-Gōchi	-	Naguwa

== History ==
Japanese National Railways (JNR) opened the station on 1 November 1960 as an intermediate station during the construction of the then Gannichi Line (岩日線, Gannichi-sen) from Kawanishi to Kawayama. With the privatization of JNR on 1 April 1987, control of the station passed to JR West which then ceded control to Nishikigawa Railway on 25 July 1987.

== Passenger statistics ==
In fiscal 2011, the station was used by an average of 11 passengers daily.
