= Kita-Gōchi Station =

Railway station in Iwakuni, Yamaguchi Prefecture, Japan

Kita-Gōchi Station 北河内駅
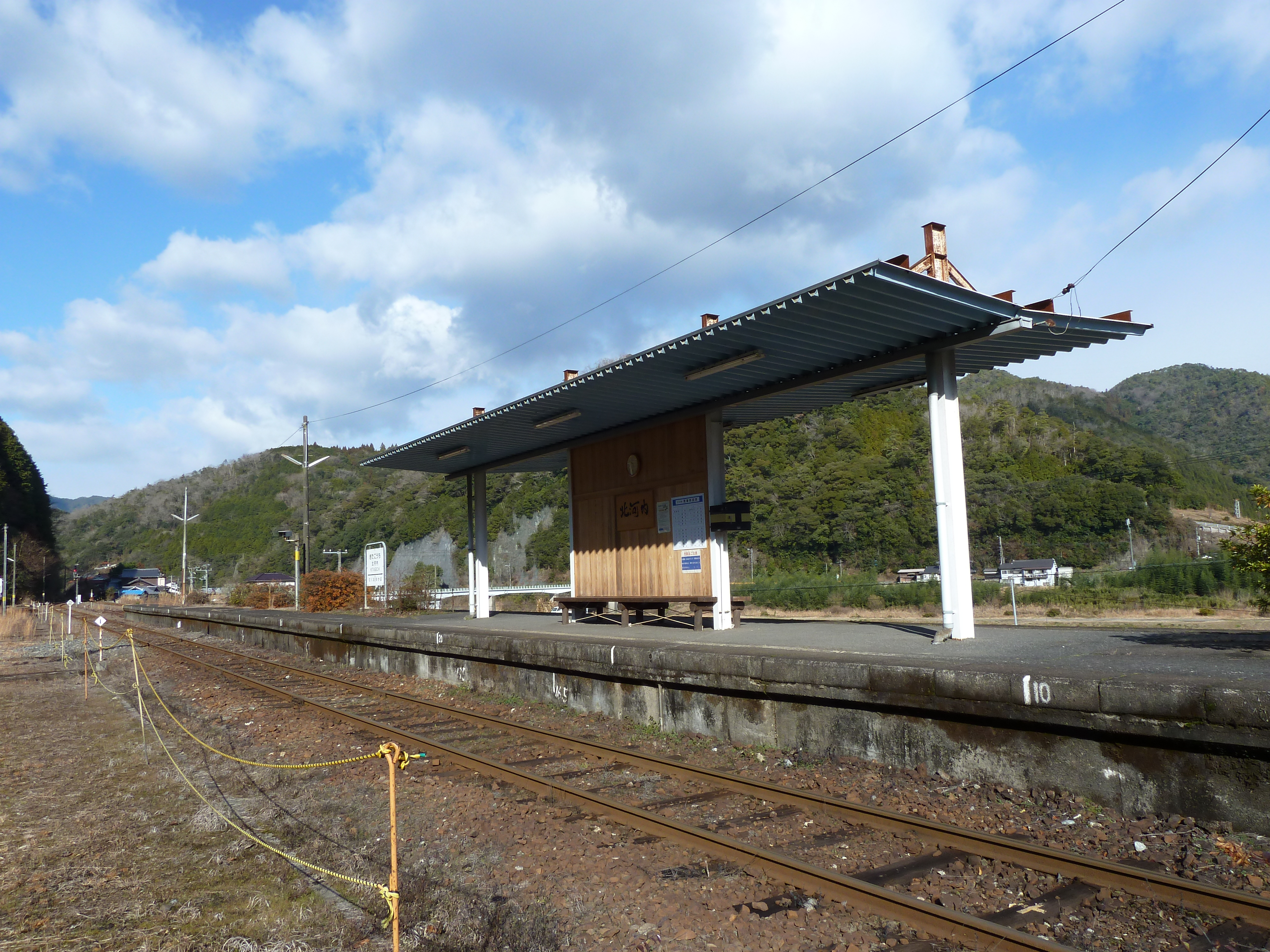

General information
- Location: Tennoo, Iwakuni, Yamaguchi （山口県岩国市天尾） Japan
- Coordinates: 34°10′33″N 132°03′53″E
- Operator: Nishikigawa Railway
- Line: Nishikigawa Seiryū Line
- Distance: 13.9 km from Kawanishi
- Connections: Bus stop

History
- Opened: 1 November 1960

Passengers
- FY2011: 180 daily
Location

Kita-Gōchi Station (北河内駅, Kita-Gōchi-eki) is a railway station on the Seiryū Line in Iwakuni, Yamaguchi Prefecture, Japan operated by the third-sector company Nishikigawa Railway.

== Lines ==
The station is served by the Seiryū Line and is located 13.9 km from the start of the line at Kawanishi.

== Adjacent stations ==
«	Service	»
Nishikigawa Seiryū Line
Yukaba	-	Mukuno

== History ==
Japanese National Railways (JNR) opened the station on 1 November 1960 as an intermediate station during the construction of the then Gannichi Line (岩日線, Gannichi-sen) from Kawanishi to Kawayama. With the privatization of JNR on 1 April 1987, control of the station passed to JR West which then ceded control to Nishikigawa Railway on 25 July 1987.

== Passenger statistics ==
In fiscal 2011, the station was used by an average of 180 passengers daily.
