= Minami-Gōchi Station =

Railway station in Iwakuni, Yamaguchi Prefecture, Japan

Minami-Gōchi Station 南河内駅
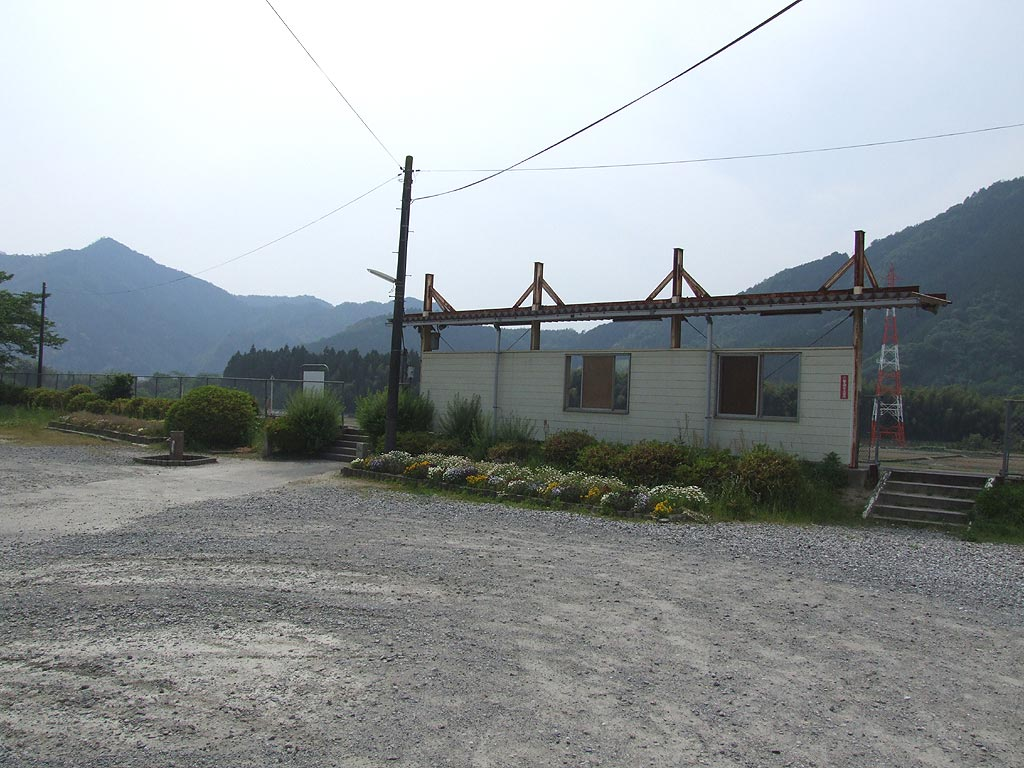
- Minami-Gōchi Station, May 2008

General information
- Location: 230, Sumi, Iwakuni, Yamaguchi （山口県岩国市角230） Japan
- Coordinates: 34°09′57″N 132°06′12″E
- Operator: Nishikigawa Railway
- Line: Nishikigawa Seiryū Line
- Distance: 8.6 km from Kawanishi
- Connections: Bus stop

History
- Opened: 1 November 1960
Location

Minami-Gōchi Station (南河内駅, Minami-Gōchi-eki) is a train station on the Seiryū Line in Iwakuni, Yamaguchi Prefecture, Japan and is operated by Nishikigawa Railway.

== Lines ==
The station is situated on the Seiryū Line and is 8.6 km from Kawanishi.

== Adjacent stations ==
«	Service	»
Nishikigawa Seiryū Line
Shūchi-Kasagami	-	Yukaba

== History ==
Japanese National Railways (JNR) opened the station on 1 November 1960 as an intermediate station during the construction of the Gannichi Line (岩日線, Gannichi-sen) from Kawanishi to Kawayama. With the privatization of JNR on 1 April 1987, control of the station was passed to JR West which then ceded control to Nishikigawa Railway on 25 July 1987.

== Passenger statistics ==
In 2011, the station was used by an average of 326 passengers daily.
