= Yanaze Station =

Railway station in Iwakuni, Yamaguchi Prefecture, Japan

Yanaze Station 柳瀬駅
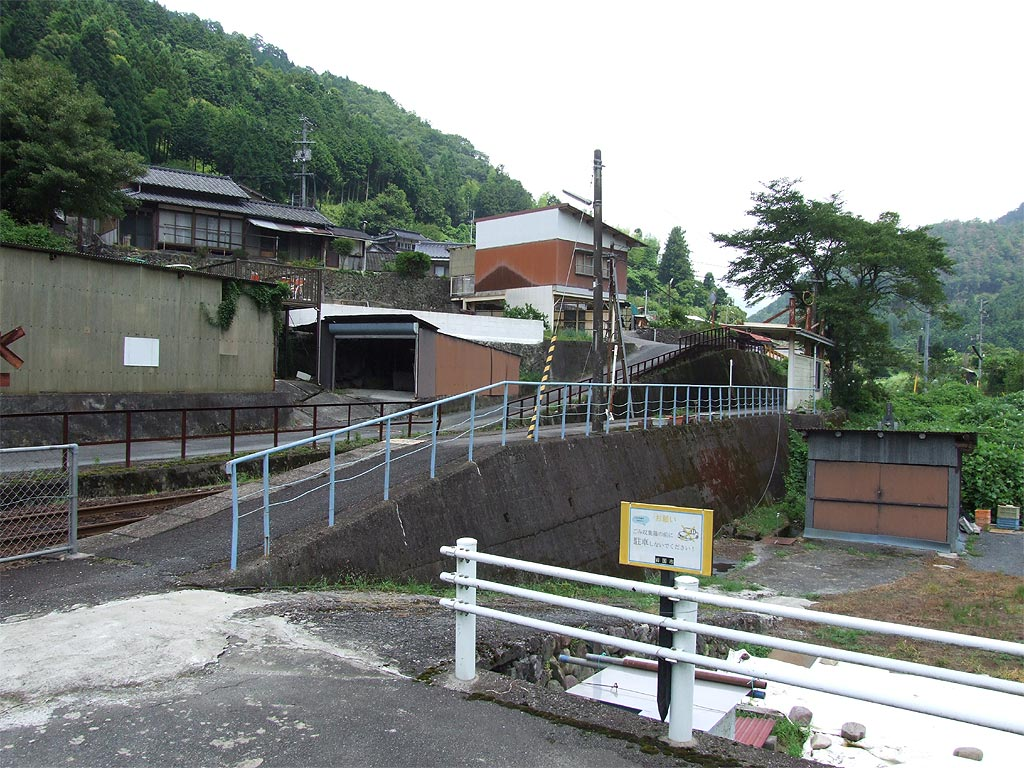
- Yanaze Station

General information
- Location: Mikawa-machi Shimegami Yanaza, Iwakuni, Yamaguchi （山口県岩国市美川町四馬神柳瀬） Japan
- Coordinates: 34°15′27″N 131°58′37″E
- Operator: Nishikigawa Railway
- Line: Nishikigawa Seiryū Line
- Distance: 31.0 km from Kawanishi
- Connections: Bus stop

History
- Opened: 1 October 1963

Passengers
- FY2011: 4 daily
Location

Yanaze Station (柳瀬駅, Yanaze-eki) is a railway station on the Nishikigawa Seiryū Line in Iwakuni, Yamaguchi Prefecture, Japan. It is operated by the Nishikigawa Railway, a third-sector railway company.

== Lines ==
The station is served by the Nishikigawa Seiryū Line and is located 31.0 km from the start of the line at Kawanishi.

== Adjacent stations ==
«	Service	»
Nishikigawa Seiryū Line
Kawayama	-	Nishiki-chō

== History ==
Japanese National Railways (JNR) opened the station on 1 October 1963 as an intermediate station when the then Gannichi Line (岩日線, Gannichi-sen) was extended from Kawayama to Nishiki-chō. With the privatization of JNR on 1 April 1987, control of the station passed to JR West which then ceded control to Nishikigawa Railway on 25 July 1987.

== Passenger statistics ==
In fiscal 2011, the station was used by an average of 4 passengers daily.
