= Yukaba Station =

Railway station in Iwakuni, Yamaguchi Prefecture, Japan

Yukaba Station 行波駅
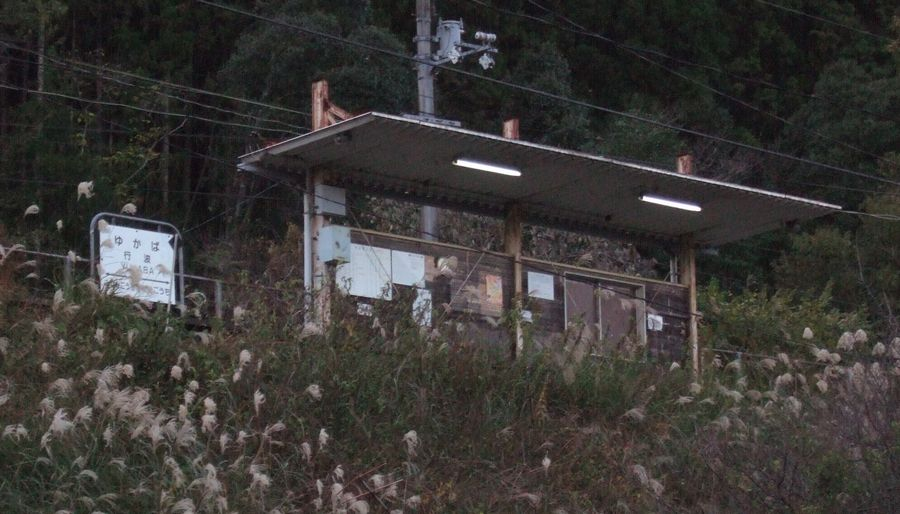

General information
- Location: Yukaba, Iwakuni, Yamaguchi （山口県岩国市行波） Japan
- Coordinates: 34°09′48″N 132°05′14″E
- Operator: Nishikigawa Railway
- Line: Nishikigawa Seiryū Line
- Distance: 11.2 km from Kawanishi
- Connections: Bus stop

History
- Opened: 1 April 1971

Passengers
- FY2011: 56
Location

Yukaba Station (行波駅, Yukaba-eki) is a railway station on the Nishikigawa Seiryū Line in Iwakuni, Yamaguchi Prefecture, Japan. It is operated by the Nishikigawa Railway, a third-sector railway company.

== Lines ==
The station is served by the Nishikigawa Seiryū Line and is located 11.2 km from the start of the line at Kawanishi.

== Adjacent stations ==
«	Service	»
Nishikigawa Seiryū Line
Minami-Gōchi	-	Kita-Gōchi

== History ==
Japanese National Railways (JNR) opened the station on 1 April 1971 as a temporary stop on the existing track of the then Gannichi Line (岩日線, Gannichi-sen). With the privatization of JNR on 1 April 1987, control of the station passed to JR West which upgraded Yukaba to a full station. Control was then ceded to Nishikigawa Railway on 25 July 1987.

== Passenger statistics ==
In fiscal 2011, the station was used by an average of 56 passengers daily.
