= Sugano =

Sugano (written: 菅野) is a Japanese surname. Notable people with the surname include:

- Kenichi Sugano (菅野 賢一, born 1971), Japanese footballer
- Sugano no Mamichi (菅野 真道, 741–814), Japanese noble
- Matsuo Sugano (菅野 松男, born 1939), Japanese astronomer
- Seiichi Sugano (菅野 誠一, 1939–2010), Japanese aikidoka
- Takuma Sugano (菅野 拓真, born 1980), Japanese footballer
- Tomoyuki Sugano (菅野 智之, born 1989), Japanese baseball player
- Yuji Sugano (菅野 裕二, born 1961), Japanese footballer

== See also ==
- Sugano Station, a railway station in Ichikawa, Chiba Prefecture, Japan
- Sugano Dam, a dam in Shūnan, Yamaguchi Prefecture, Japan
- 5872 Sugano, a main-belt asteroid
