= Shūchi-Kasagami Station =

Railway station in Iwakuni, Yamaguchi Prefecture, Japan

Shūchi-Kasagami Station 守内かさ神駅
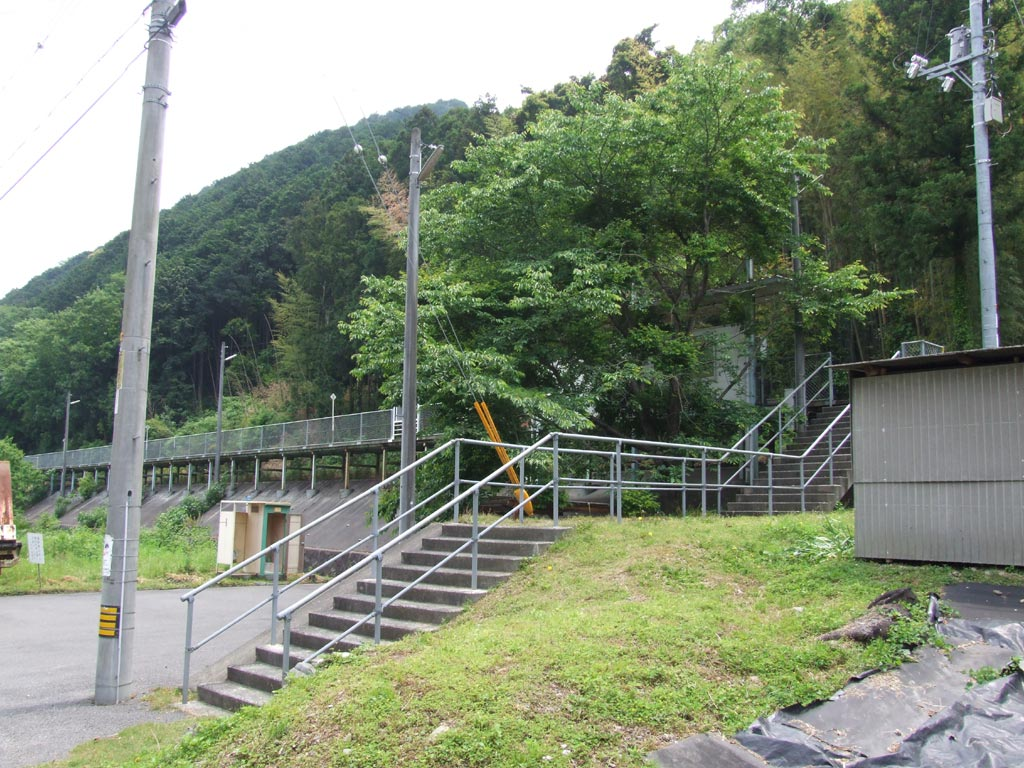
- Shuuchi-Kasagami Station

General information
- Location: Mishō, Iwakuni, Yamaguchi （山口県岩国市御庄） Japan
- Coordinates: 34°10′12″N 132°08′09″E
- Operator: Nishikigawa Railway
- Line: Nishikigawa Seiryū Line
- Distance: 5.4 km from Kawanishi
- Connections: Bus stop

History
- Opened: 18 March 1993

Passengers
- FY2011: 4 daily
Location

Shūchi-Kasagami Station (守内かさ神駅, Shuuchi-Kasagami-eki) is a railway station on the Nishikigawa Seiryū Line in Iwakuni, Yamaguchi Prefecture, Japan. It is operated by the Nishikigawa Railway, a third-sector railway company.

== Lines ==
The station is served by the Nishikigawa Seiryū Line and is located 5.4 km from the start of the line at Kawanishi.

== Adjacent stations ==
«	Service	»
Nishikigawa Seiryū Line
Seiryū-Shin-Iwakuni	-	Minami-Gōchi

== History ==
The station was opened on 18 March 1993 as an added station on the existing track of the Nishikigawa Seiryū Line.

== Passenger statistics ==
In fiscal 2011, the station was used by an average of 4 passengers daily.
