= Sugano Dam =

Infrastructure in Yamaguchi Prefecture, Japan

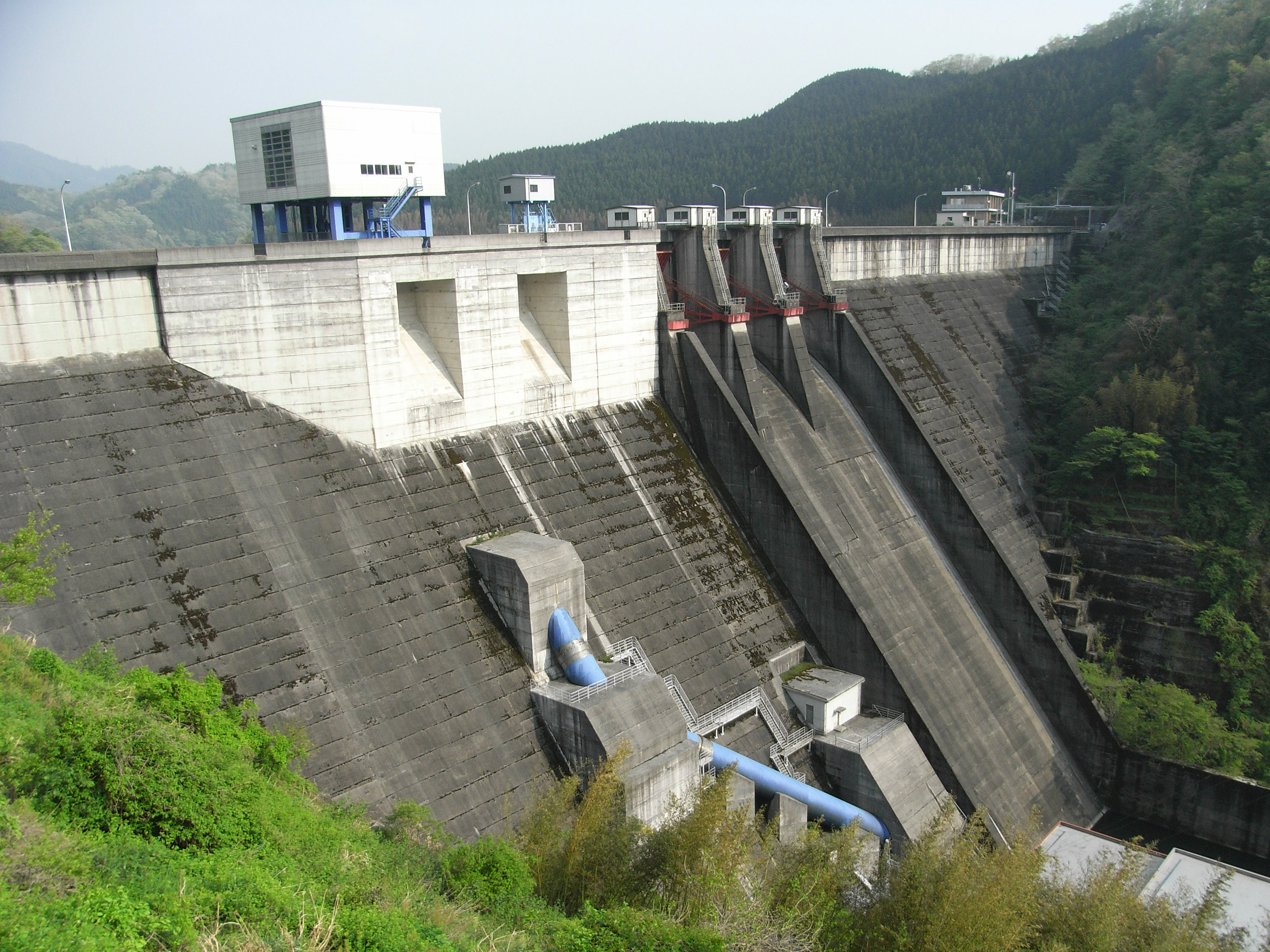
- A view of Sugano Dam
- Interactive map of Sugano Dam
- Location: Shūnan, Yamaguchi, Japan.
- Coordinates: 34°08′27.9″N 131°54′14.4″E

Sugano Dam (菅野ダム) is a multipurpose dam located in the city of Shūnan, Yamaguchi Prefecture, downstream from the Nishiki River.

It was built in addition to the preexisting Kōdō Dam in order to satisfy an increase in the demand for suitable water transportation channels for industrial use. It was completed in 1965 and assumed a primary role in flood control and irrigation operations.

The whole project accounted for the use of 328 ha of land, the relocation of 163 homes and the submersion of the village of Sugano, from which the dam takes its name.

As of 2008 its role in flood control has been largely replaced by another dam built in Iwakuni and is mostly used for water conservation and irrigation purposes.
