= Seiryū-Shin-Iwakuni Station =

Railway station in Iwakuni, Yamaguchi Prefecture, Japan

Seiryū-Shin-Iwakuni Station 清流新岩国駅
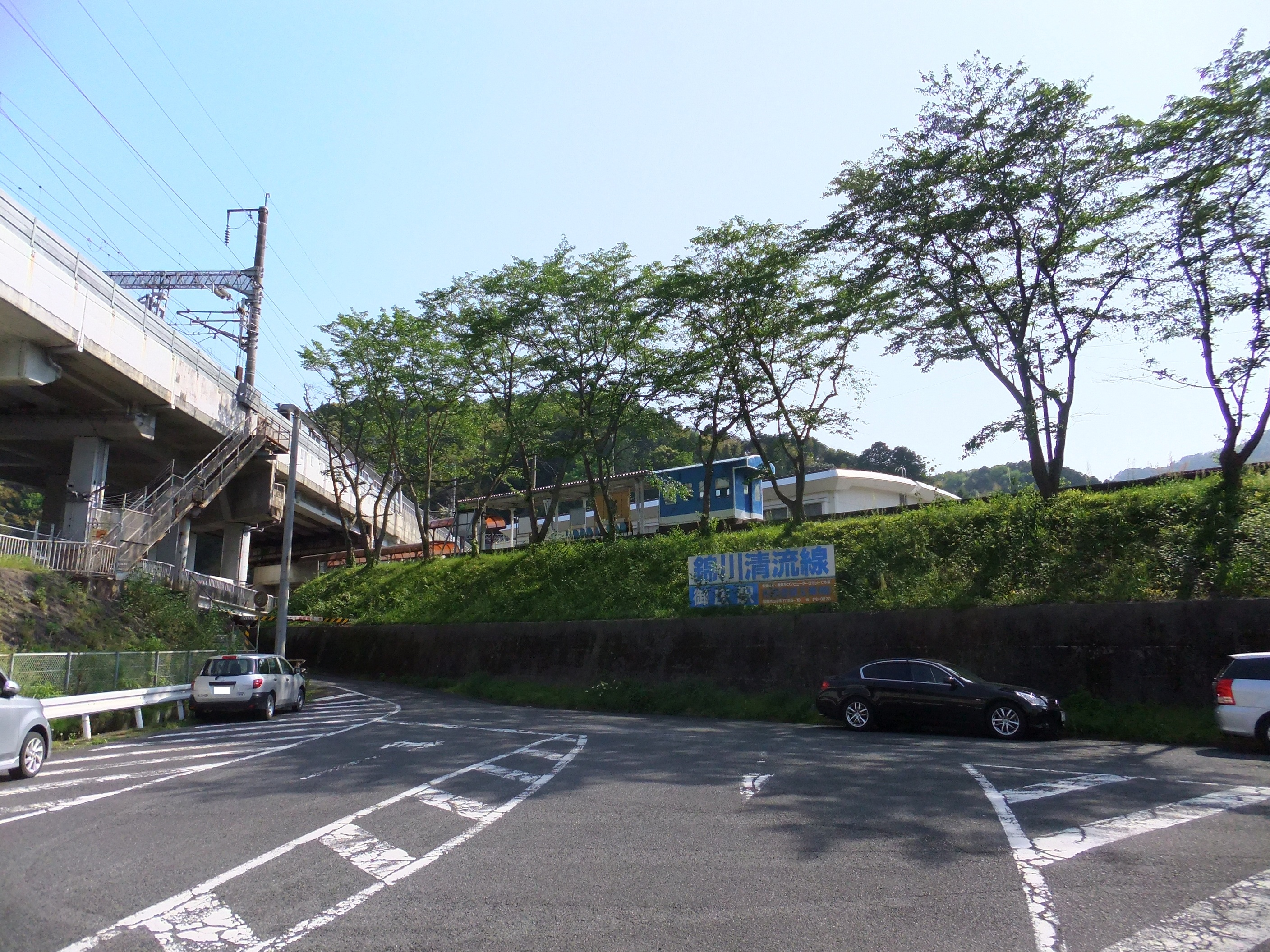
- The station in May 2012 before renaming

General information
- Location: 1 Mishō, Iwakuni, Yamaguchi （山口県岩国市御庄一丁目） Japan
- Coordinates: 34°09′44″N 132°08′52″E
- Operator: Nishikigawa Railway
- Line: Nishikigawa Seiryū Line
- Distance: 3.9 km from Kawanishi
- Connections: Bus stop

History
- Opened: 1 November 1960
- Former names: Mishō (until 2013)

Passengers
- FY2011: 77
Location

Seiryū-Shin-Iwakuni Station (清流新岩国駅, Seiryū-Shin-Iwakuni-eki) is a railway station in Iwakuni, Yamaguchi, Yamaguchi Prefecture, Japan. It is operated by the Nishikigawa Railway, a third-sector railway company.

== Lines ==
Seiryū-Shin-Iwakuni Station is served by the Nishikigawa Railway Nishikigawa Seiryū Line and is located 3.9 km from the start of the line at Kawanishi. It is linked by a walkway to Shin-Iwakuni Station on the Sanyo Shinkansen approximately 300 m from this station.

== Adjacent stations ==
«	Service	»
Nishikigawa Seiryū Line
Kawanishi	-	Shūchi-Kasagami

== History ==
Japanese National Railways (JNR) opened the station with the name Mishō Station (御庄駅) on 1 November 1960 as an intermediate station during the construction of the then Gannichi Line (岩日線, Gannichi-sen) from Kawanishi to Kawayama. With the privatization of JNR on 1 April 1987, control of the station passed to JR West which then ceded control to Nishikigawa Railway on 25 July 1987. On 16 March 2013, it was renamed Seiryū-Shin-Iwakuni Station to emphasize the connection with the nearby shinkansen station.

== Passenger statistics ==
In fiscal 2011, the station was used by an average of 77 passengers daily.
