= Nishiki River =

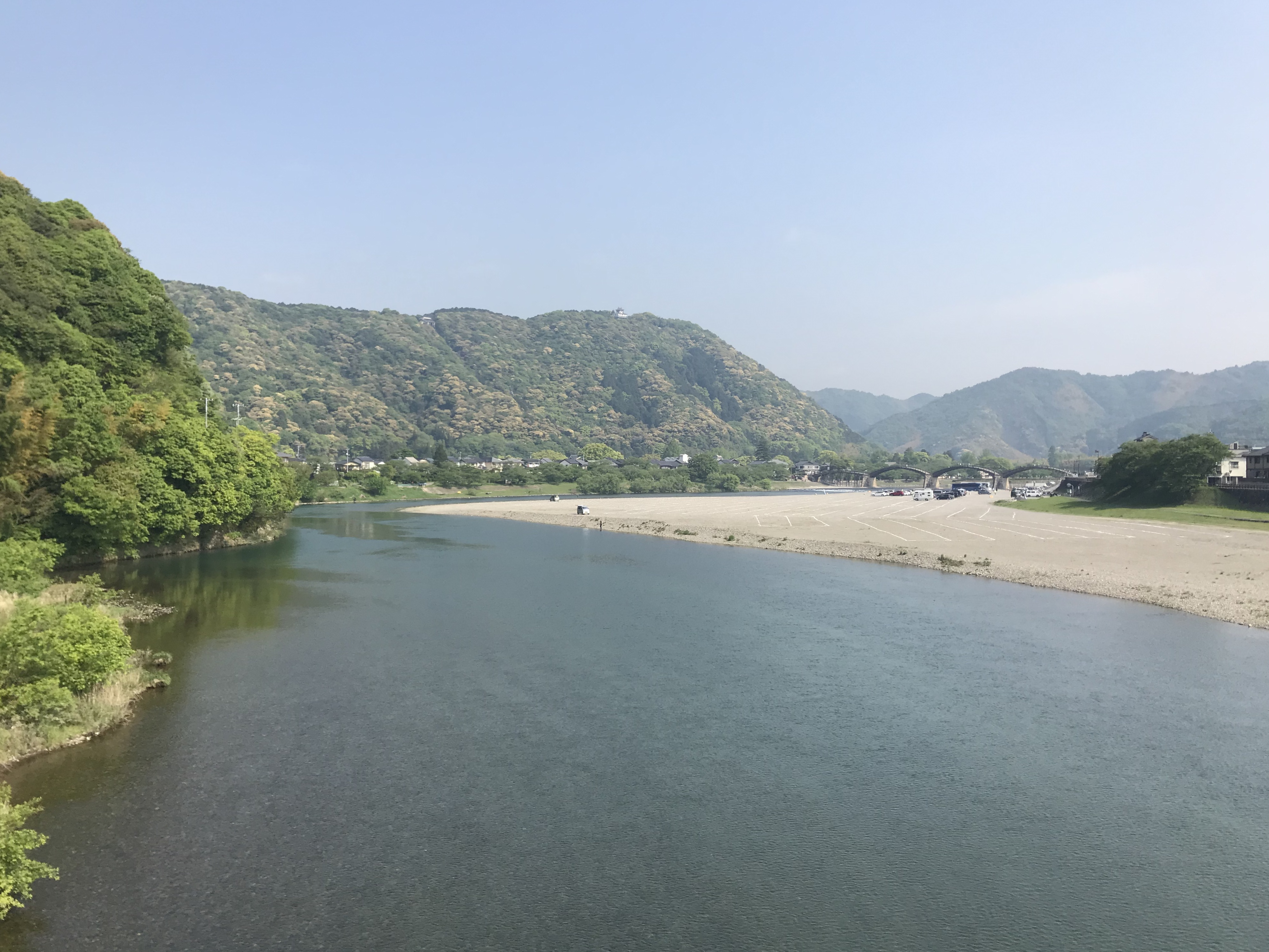
- Remote view of Kintai Bridge and Iwakuni Castle

- Native name: 錦川 (Japanese)

Physical characteristics
- Source
  - location: Shūnan, Yamaguchi, Japan
- Mouth
  - location: Seto Inland Sea
- Length: 110 km (68 mi)
- Basin size: 885 km^{2} (342 sq mi)

The Nishiki River (錦川, Nishiki-gawa) is a 110 km long river, the longest in Yamaguchi Prefecture, Japan. The Nishiki is the main river in a larger system measuring 331.8 km in total. The government of Japan classifies it as a second-class river system. The Nishiki River system drains an area of 884.2 km^{2}.

The Nishiki River has its source in the city of Shūnan. At its mouth in the part of the city of Iwakuni that was formerly the separate town of Nishiki, it drains into the Inland Sea.

The river is paralleled by the Nishikigawa Seiryū Line. It is known for having a station, Seiryu Miharashi Station, which exists only for viewing the river, with no external exits or entrances.

Dams on the Nishiki include the Kōdō and the Sugano.

== Sources ==
This article incorporates material from the article 錦川 (Nishiki-gawa) in the Japanese Wikipedia, retrieved on December 11, 2008.
