= Kōdō Dam =

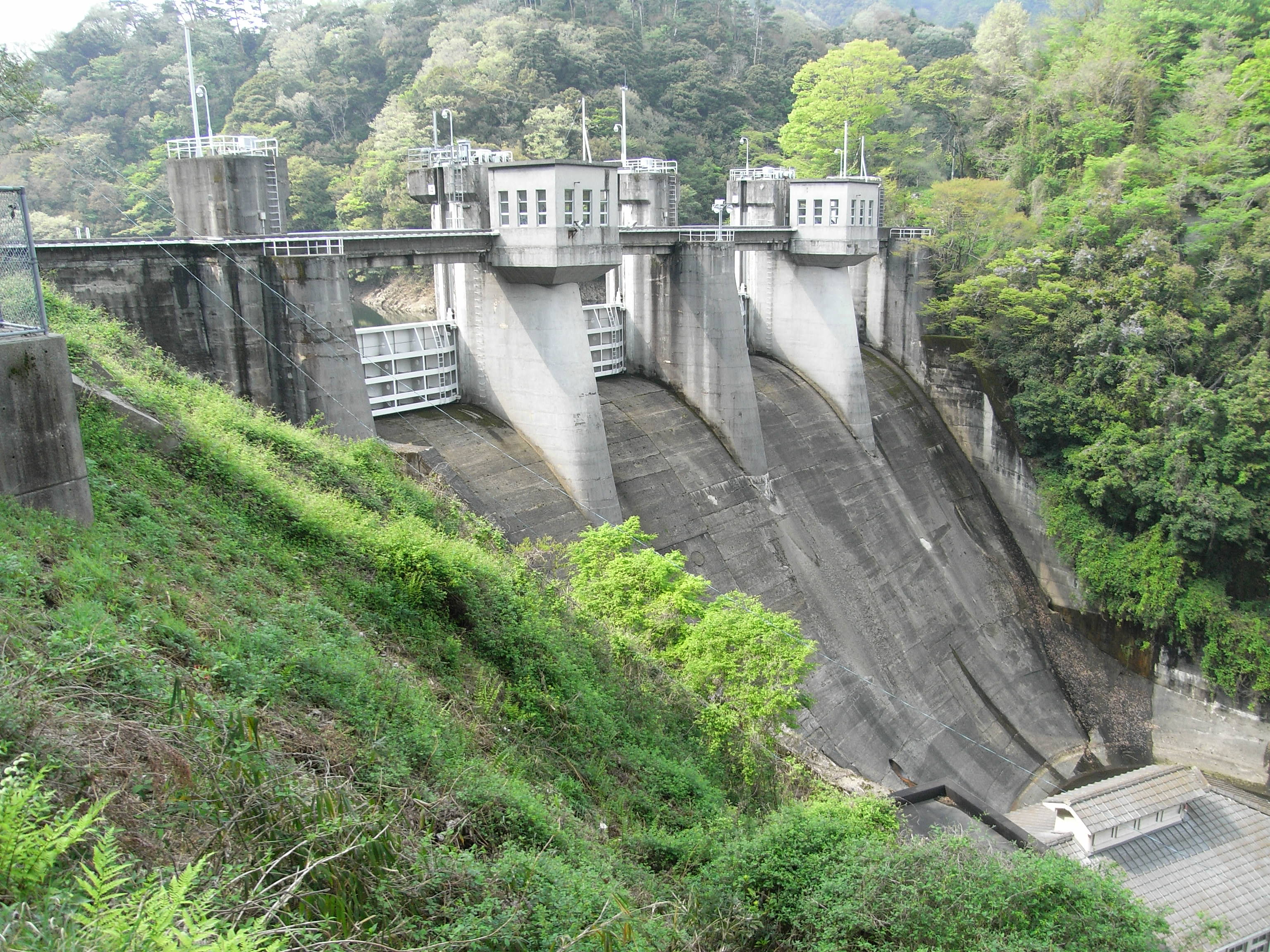
- A view of Kōdō Dam
- Interactive map of Kōdō Dam
- Location: Shūnan, Yamaguchi, Japan
- Coordinates: 34°08′27.9″N 131°54′14.4″E

Kōdō Dam (向道ダム) is a dam located in the city of Shūnan, Yamaguchi Prefecture, upstream of the Nishiki River.

== History ==
Kōdō Dam was built under the auspices of a stream regulation program drafted by the prewar Home Ministry in order to prevent flooding, generate electricity and to facilitate water transportation. It was built in March 1938 and was completed two and half years later in October 1940.

Even though construction work for Okiura Dam—built under the same governmental plan in Aomori Prefecture and by now submerged—started earlier in 1933, it was only finished in 1945, making Kōdō Dam the first multipurpose dam to be built in Japan.

In 1942, control of operations (with regard to water transportation and generation of electricity) was handed to the Chugoku Electric Power Company. The postwar period (1965) saw an increase in the demand for suitable water transportation channels for industrial leading to the construction of Sugano Dam located downstream. Thereafter flood control and irrigation operations were mostly handled at Sugano.

As of 2008, both bridges are interconnected and is still used to produce electricity as well as for minor general flood control and irrigation purposes.
