= Nekasa Station =

Railway station in Iwakuni, Yamaguchi Prefecture, Japan

Nekasa Station 根笠駅
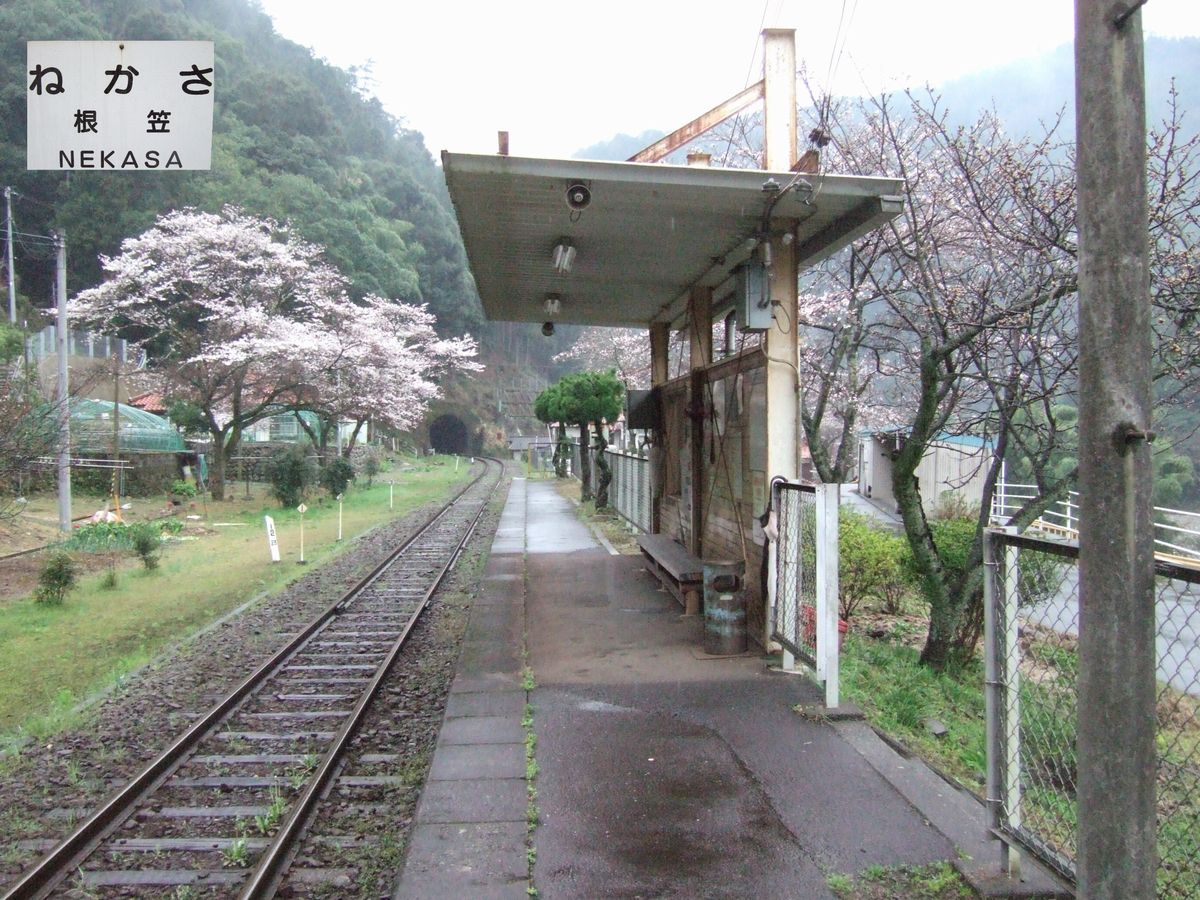

General information
- Location: Mikawa-machi Nekasa, Iwakuni, Yamaguchi （山口県岩国市美川町根笠） Japan
- Coordinates: 34°12′38″N 131°59′55″E
- Operator: Nishikigawa Railway
- Line: Nishikigawa Seiryū Line
- Distance: 23.5 km from Kawanishi
- Connections: Bus stop

History
- Opened: 1 November 1960

Passengers
- FY2011: 36 daily
Location

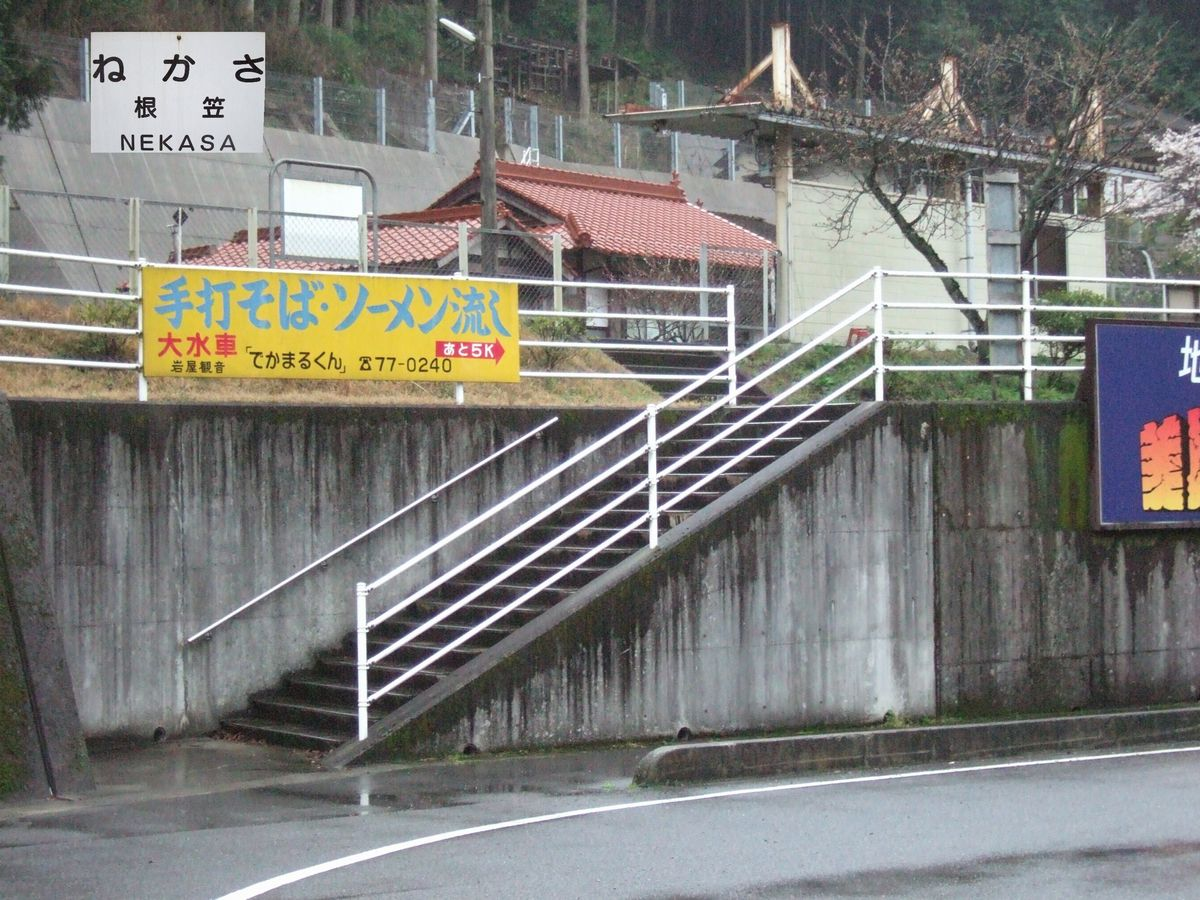
Nekasa Station

Nekasa Station (根笠駅, Nekasa-eki) is a railway station on the Nishikigawa Seiryū Line in Iwakuni, Yamaguchi Prefecture, Japan. It is operated by the Nishikigawa Railway, a third-sector railway company.

== Lines ==
The station is served by the Nishikigawa Seiryū Line and is located 23.5 km from the start of the line at Kawanishi.

== Adjacent stations ==
| « | Service | » |
Nishikigawa Railway
Nishikigawa Seiryū Line
| Naguwa | - | Kawayama |

== History ==
Japanese National Railways (JNR) opened the station on 1 November 1960 as an intermediate station during the construction of the then Gannichi Line (岩日線, Gannichi-sen) from Kawanishi to Kawayama. With the privatization of JNR on 1 April 1987, control of the station passed to JR West which then ceded control to Nishikigawa Railway on 25 July 1987.

== Passenger statistics ==
In fiscal 2011, the station was used by an average of 36 passengers daily.
