= Seiryu Miharashi Station =

Railway station in Iwakuni, Yamaguchi Prefecture, Japan

Seiryu Miharashi Station 清流みはらし駅
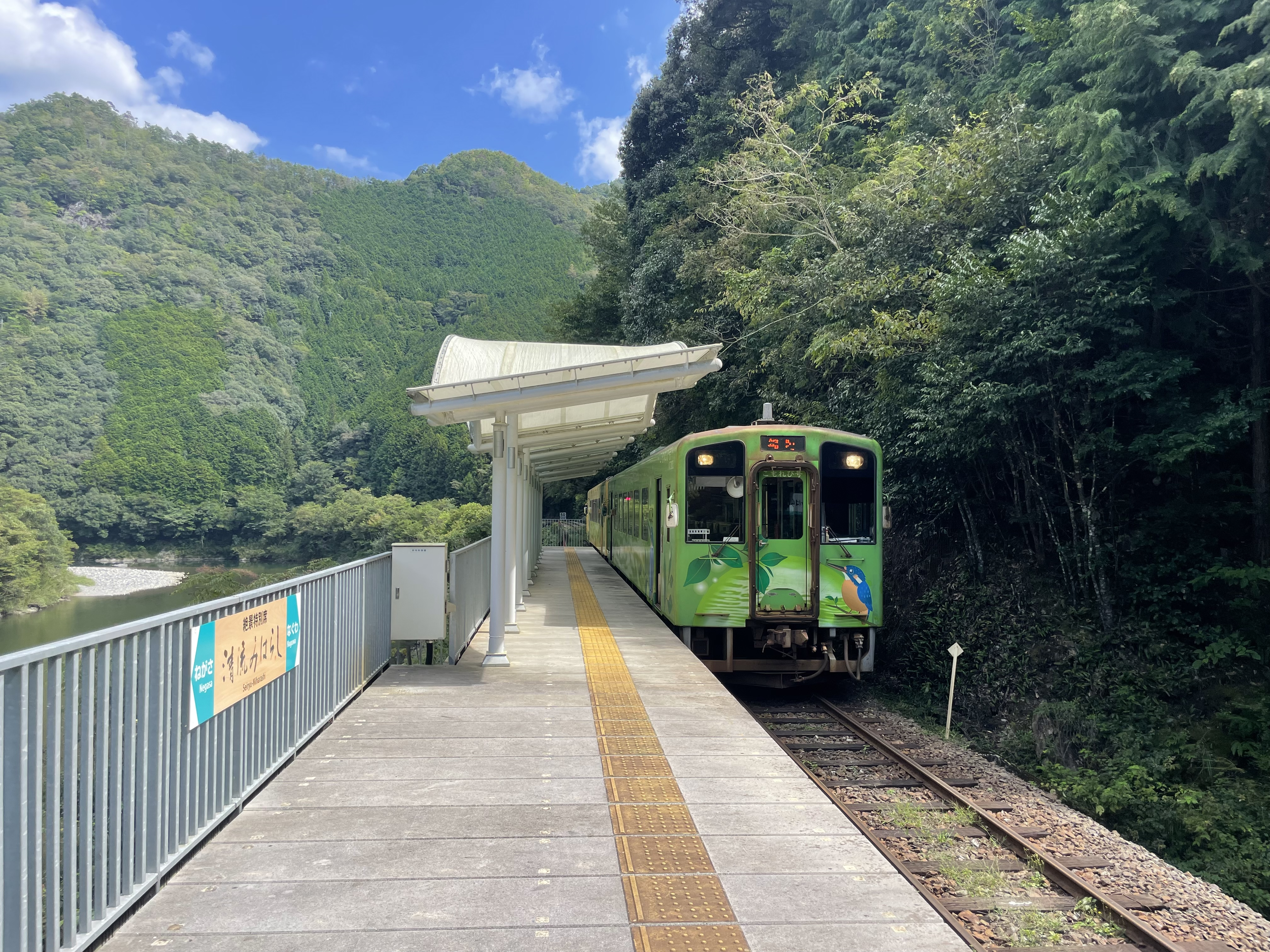

General information
- Location: Yamaguchi Prefecture; Japan
- Coordinates: 34°12′40″N 132°00′23″E
- Operator: Nishikigawa Railway
- Line: Nishikigawa Seiryū Line

History
- Opened: 19 March 2019
Location
- Location within Yamaguchi Prefecture Location within Japan

Seiryu Miharashi Station (清流みはらし駅, Seiryū Miharashi-eki) is a railway station on the Nishikigawa Seiryū Line in Yamaguchi Prefecture, Japan. It is operated by the Nishikigawa Railway, a third-sector railway company.

== Description ==
The station, which opened on March 19, 2019, is on the Nishikigawa Seiryū Line and is located between the stations of Naguwa and Nekasa. Due to the lack of any roads or footpaths leading to the station, Seiryu Miharashi can only be reached by train. Users are unable to get out of the station as well. Cost of the construction was approximately 112 million yen. The lack of access forced construction materials of the station to be transported by train after services ended at night. It was built as a viewing platform and is facing the Nishiki River. The station is only served by special trains. Despite its high costs, the station has less than a thousand users a year compared to the estimate of 4,600 users, and it has been criticised for this.

== Adjacent stations ==
«	Service	»
Nishikigawa Seiryū Line
Naguwa	—	Nekasa

== See also ==
- List of railway stations in Japan
