= Nishiki-chō Station =

Railway station in Iwakuni, Yamaguchi Prefecture, Japan

Nishiki-chō Station 錦町駅
- Nishiki-chō Station main entrance

General information
- Location: Nishiki-machi Hirose, Iwakuni, Yamaguchi （山口県岩国市錦町広瀬） Japan
- Coordinates: 34°15′53″N 131°57′46″E
- Operator: Nishikigawa Railway
- Line: Nishikigawa Seiryū Line
- Distance: 32.7 km from Kawanishi

History
- Opened: 1 October 1963

Passengers
- FY2011: 203 daily
Location

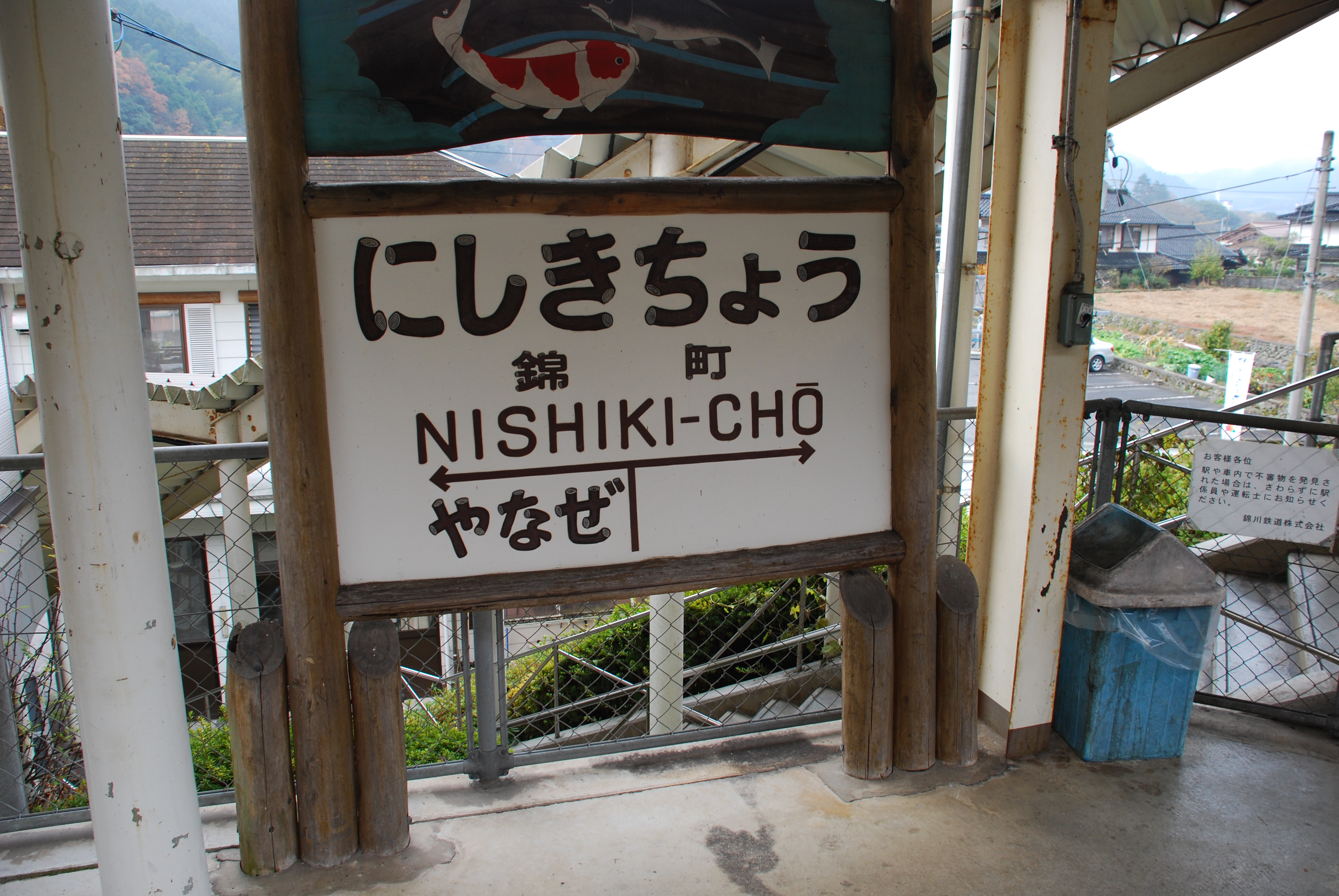
Nishiki-chō Station platform

Nishiki-chō Station (錦町駅, Nishikichō-eki) is a railway station on the Nishikigawa Seiryū Line in Iwakuni, Yamaguchi Prefecture, Japan. It is operated by the Nishikigawa Railway, a third-sector railway company.

== Lines ==
The station is served by the Nishikigawa Seiryū Line and is located 32.7 km from the start of the line at Kawanishi.

== Adjacent stations ==
«	Service	»
Nishikigawa Seiryū Line
Yanaze	-	Terminus

== History ==
Japanese National Railways (JNR) opened the station on 1 October 1963 as the western terminus of the then Gannichi Line (岩日線, Gannichi-sen) when the track was extended from Kawayama. With the privatization of JNR on 1 April 1987, control of the station passed to JR West which then ceded control to Nishikigawa Railway on 25 July 1987.

== Passenger statistics ==
In fiscal 2011, the station was used by an average of 203 passengers daily.
