= Nishikigawa Seiryū Line =

Railway line in Yamaguchi Prefecture, Japan

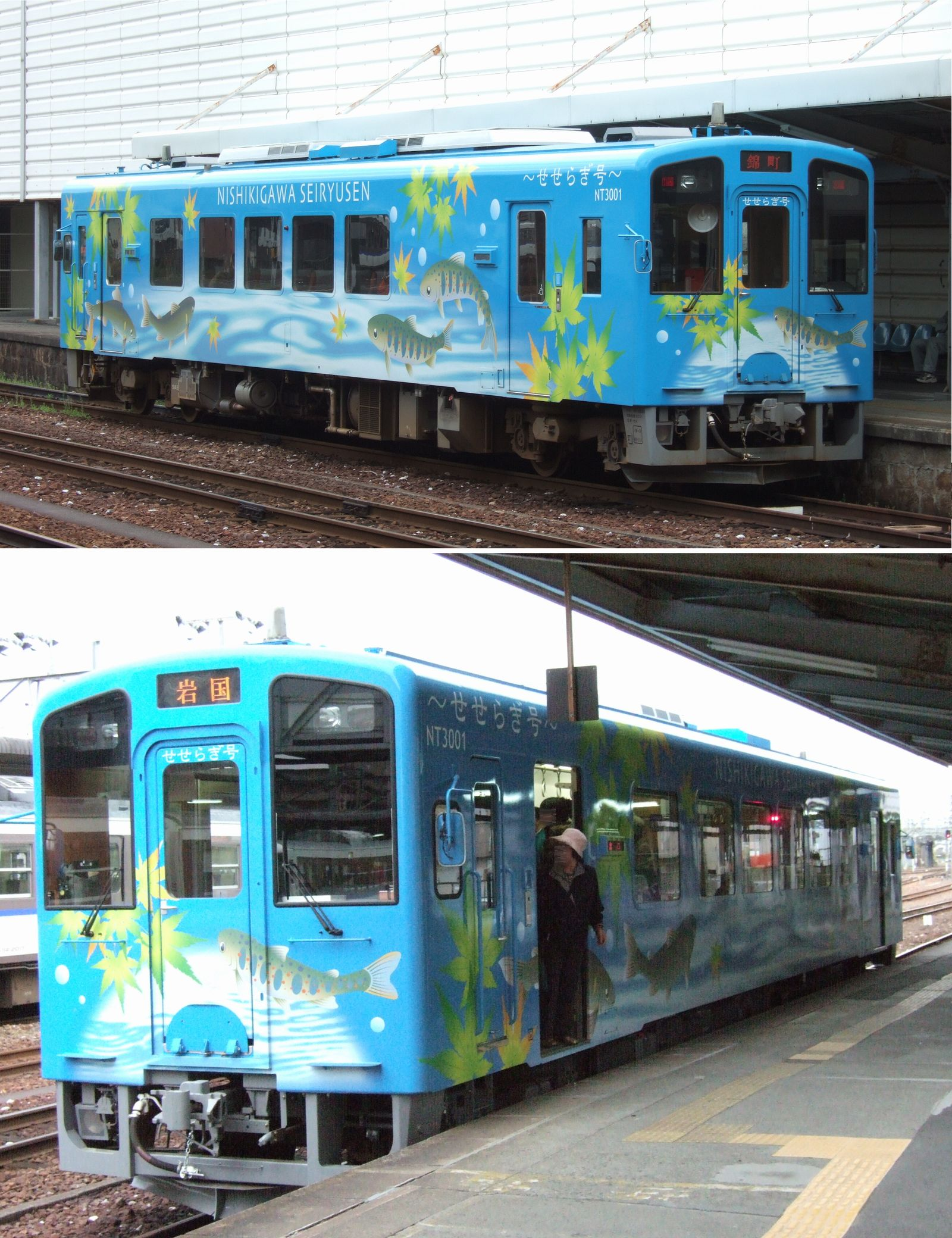
NT3000 series DMU, "Seseragi-gō"

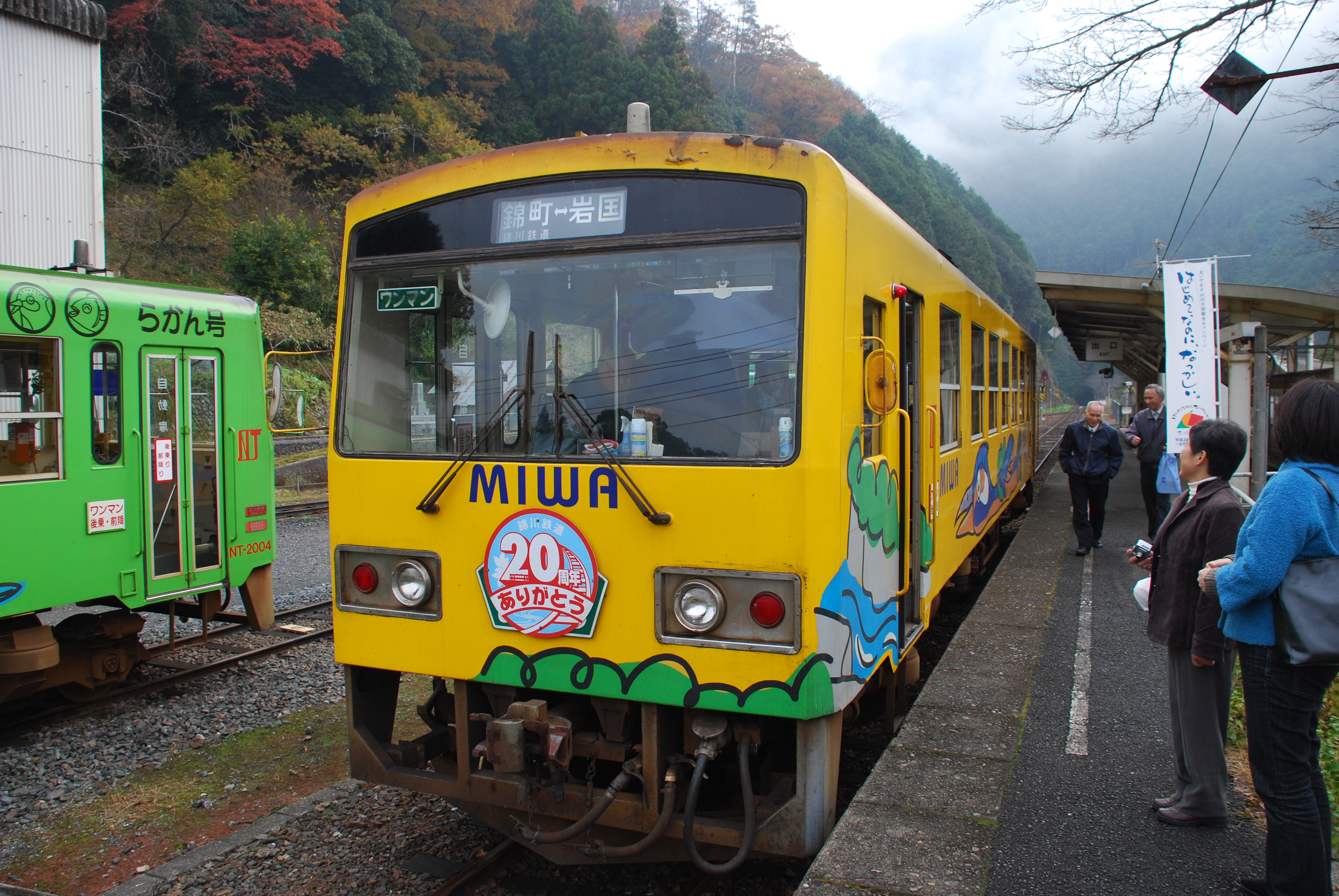
NT2000 series diesel railcar at Nishiki-chō Station

The Nishikigawa Seiryū Line (錦川清流線, Nishikigawa Seiryū-sen; lit. 'Nishiki River Clear Stream Line') is a Japanese railway line connecting Kawanishi and Nishiki-chō stations, all within Iwakuni, Yamaguchi. It is the only railway line operated by Nishikigawa Railway (錦川鉄道, Nishikigawa Tetsudō), a third-sector railway company which took over a former West Japan Railway Company (JR West) line in 1987. The company also operates bus lines and a travel agency. As its name suggests, the line parallels the Nishiki River. An extension to Nichihara via JR's Yamaguchi Line was proposed but not completed (see History section below).

The line saw a ridership of 119,758 passengers in 2025.

== Basic data ==
- Distance: 32.7 km (20.3 mi)
- Gauge: 1,067 mm (3 ft 6 in)
- Stations: 13
- Track: single
- Electric supply: not electrified
- Railway signalling:
  - Kawanishi – Kita-Gōchi: Automatic
  - Kita-Gōchi – Nishiki-chō: Simplified automatic

== Services ==
All services on the line are Local trains, stopping at every station.

All trains run via through service to and from Iwakuni Station on the JR West Gantoku Line.

As of August 2026, there are 10 round trips per day between Iwakuni and Nishiki-chō. Trains generally operate around every 1½ hours, although in the middle of the day there is a gap of over 3 hours in services towards Nishiki-chō and over 2½ hours towards Iwakuni. Trips along the full line take 64–70 minutes.

== Stations ==
All stations are in Iwakuni, Yamaguchi.

| Line | Name | | Distance Between Stations (km) | Distance Total (km) | Connections |
|---|---|---|---|---|---|
| JR West Gantoku Line | Iwakuni | 岩国 | 0.0 | 0.0 | San'yō Main Line |
| JR West Gantoku Line | Nishi-Iwakuni | 西岩国 | 3.7 | 3.7 | Gantoku Line |
| Nishikigawa Seiryū Line | Kawanishi | 川西 | 1.9 | 5.6 | Gantoku Line |
| Nishikigawa Seiryū Line | Seiryū-Shin-Iwakuni | 清流新岩国 | 3.9 | 9.5 | Sanyō Shinkansen (Shin-Iwakuni) |
| Nishikigawa Seiryū Line | Shūchi-Kasagami | 守内かさ神 | 1.5 | 11.0 | |
| Nishikigawa Seiryū Line | Minami-Gōchi | 南河内 | 3.2 | 14.2 | |
| Nishikigawa Seiryū Line | Yukaba | 行波 | 2.6 | 16.8 | |
| Nishikigawa Seiryū Line | Kita-Gōchi | 北河内 | 2.7 | 19.5 | |
| Nishikigawa Seiryū Line | Mukuno | 椋野 | 3.8 | 23.3 | |
| Nishikigawa Seiryū Line | Naguwa | 南桑 | 3.1 | 26.4 | |
| Nishikigawa Seiryū Line | Seiryu Miharashi | 清流みはらし | 1.7 | 28.1 | Temporary station, only served by special trains |
| Nishikigawa Seiryū Line | Nekasa | 根笠 | 1.0 | 29.1 | |
| Nishikigawa Seiryū Line | Kawayama | 河山 | 4.4 | 33.5 | |
| Nishikigawa Seiryū Line | Yanaze | 柳瀬 | 3.1 | 36.6 | |
| Nishikigawa Seiryū Line | Nishiki-chō | 錦町 | 1.7 | 38.3 | |

== Rolling stock ==
- Nishikigawa Railway NT3000 series: 4 cars, diesel, manufactured in 2007–2008 by Niigata Transys.

== History ==
The Gannichi Line (岩日線, Gannichi-sen) opened to Kawayama on 1 November 1960, operated by Japanese National Railways (JNR), and was extended to Nishiki-chō in 1963. Construction of the proposed extension to Nichihara on the Yamaguchi Line commenced in 1967, and about 50% of the roadbed had been completed when construction was abandoned in 1980.

The Nishikigawa Railway was established on 1 April 1987, renaming and taking over operations of the line from 25 July of the same year.

The line saw its peak ridership of 584,170 passengers in the year 1988.

Seiryu Miharashi Station was opened on March 19, 2019. It is a temporary station only served by special trains, built as a viewing platform with scenic views facing the Nishiki River. There is no road or pedestrian access to the station.

== See also ==
- List of railway companies in Japan
- List of railway lines in Japan
