= Hongō, Yamaguchi =

Village in Yamaguchi Prefecture, Japan

Hongō (本郷村, Hongō-son) was a village located in Kuga District, Yamaguchi Prefecture, Japan.

As of 2003, the village had an estimated population of 1,330 and a density of 32.96 persons per km^{2}. The total area was 40.35 km^{2}.

On March 20, 2006, Hongō, along with the towns of Kuga, Mikawa, Miwa, Nishiki, Shūtō and Yū (all from Kuga District), was merged into the expanded city of Iwakuni. It was the last remaining village within Yamaguchi Prefecture.
