= Yū, Yamaguchi =

Dissolved municipality in Yamaguchi prefecture, Japan

Yū or Yuu (由宇町, Yū-chō) was a town located in Kuga District, Yamaguchi Prefecture, Japan.

As of 2003, the town had an estimated population of 9,519 and a density of 326.22 persons per km^{2}. The total area was 29.18 km^{2}.

On March 20, 2006, Yū, along with the towns of Kuga, Mikawa, Miwa, Nishiki and Shūtō, and the village of Hongō (all from Kuga District), was merged into the expanded city of Iwakuni.

== Sports ==
The town is home to Hiroshima Toyo Carp's minor league team. The team's ball park, Yuu Baseball Ground, is located approximately 20 kilometres (12 mi) southwest of Iwakuni.
