= Kuga District, Yamaguchi =

District in Yamaguchi prefecture, Japan

Coordinates: 34.1895°N 132.2115°E

Location of Kuga District in Yamaguchi Prefecture

Kuga (玖珂郡, Kuga-gun) is a district located in Yamaguchi Prefecture, Japan. Tsugumasa Muraoka is the Governor of Yamaguchi over seeing the Kuga District.

At the 2005 Census, the district had an estimated population of 6,442. The total area is 10.56 km^{2}.

The district has one town.

- Waki

== District Timeline ==
- April 1, 1951-The village of Mikawa gained town status.
- April 1, 1971-The village of Obatake gained town status.
- April 1, 1973-The village of Waki gained town status.
- February 21, 2005-The town of Ōbatake merged with the old city of Yanai to form the new city of Yanai.
- March 20, 2006-The towns of Kuga, Mikawa, Miwa, Nishiki, Shūtō and Yū, and the village of Hongō merged with the old city of Iwakuni to form the new city of Iwakuni.
