= Miwa, Yamaguchi =

Town in Kuga, Yamaguchi, Japan

Miwa (美和町, Miwa-chō) was a town located in Kuga District, Yamaguchi Prefecture, Japan.

As of 2003, the town had an estimated population of 5,062 and a density of 39.69 persons per km^{2}. The total area was 127.53 km^{2}.

On March 20, 2006, Miwa, along with the towns of Kuga, Mikawa, Nishiki, Shūtō and Yū, and the village of Hongō (all from Kuga District), was merged into the expanded city of Iwakuni.
