= Ōbatake, Yamaguchi =

Dissolved municipality in Yamaguchi prefecture, Japan

Ōbatake (大畠町, Ōbatake-chō) was a town located in Kuga District, Yamaguchi Prefecture, Japan.

As of 2003, the town had an estimated population of 3,583 and a density of 298.33 persons per km^{2}. The total area was 12.01 km^{2}.

On February 21, 2005, Ōbatake was merged into the expanded city of Yanai.
