= Iwakuni =

Iwakuni Japanese: 岩国市
- City
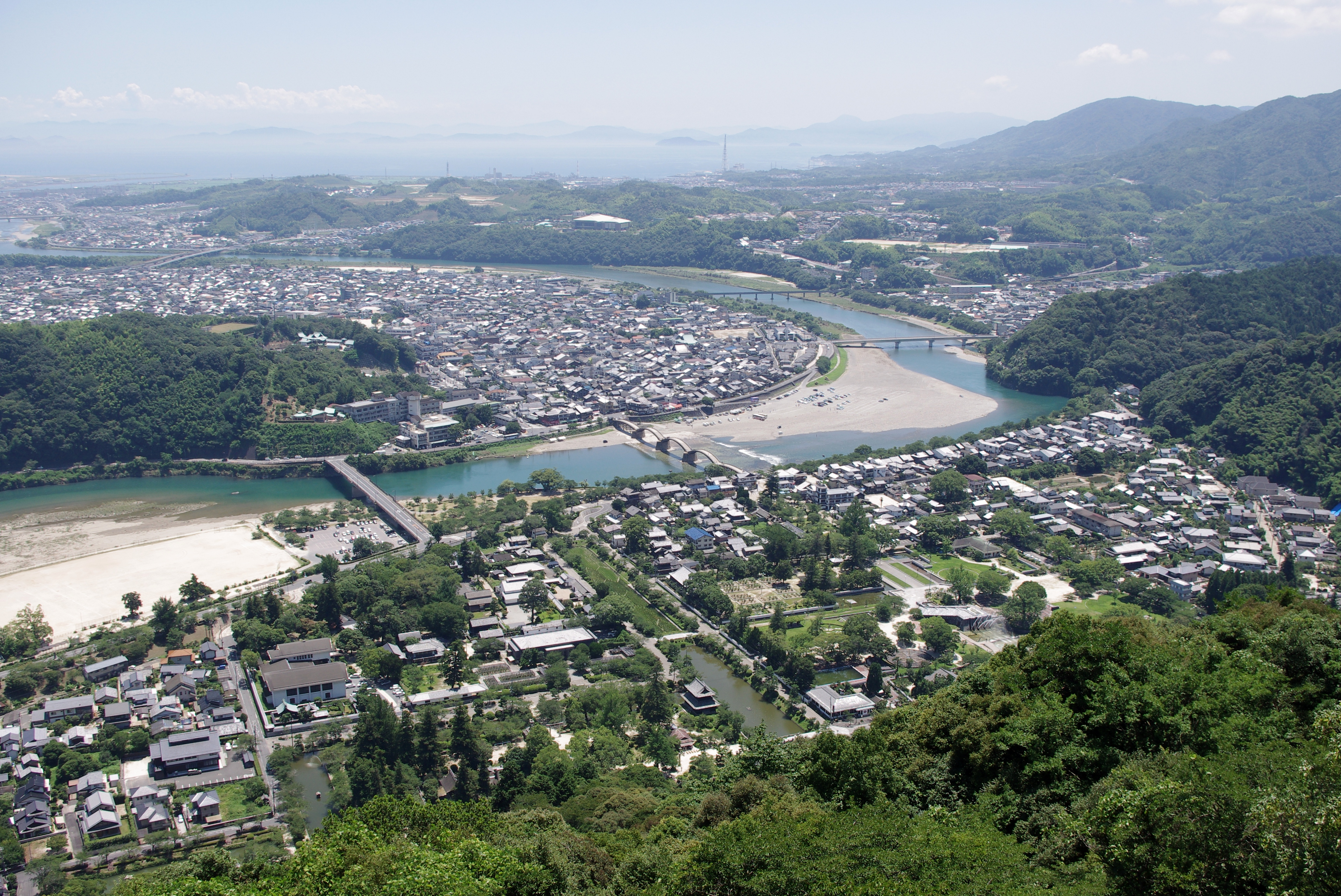
- View of Iwakuni from Iwakuni Castle (2010)

- Flag Emblem
- Interactive map of Iwakuni
- Location in Japan
- Coordinates: 34°9′59″N 132°13′8″E
- Country: Japan
- Region: Chūgoku (San'yō)
- Prefecture: Yamaguchi

Government
  - Mayor: Yoshihiko Fukuda

Area
  - Total: 873.72 km^{2} (337.35 sq mi)

Population (June 1, 2023)
  - Total: 127,512
  - Density: 156.95/km^{2} (406.5/sq mi)
- Time zone: UTC+09:00 (JST)
- City hall address: 1-14-51 Imazumachi, Iwakuni-shi, Yamaguchi-ken 740-8585
- Climate: Cfa
- Website: Official website
- Symbols
- Flower: Cherry blossom
- Tree: Cinnamomum camphora

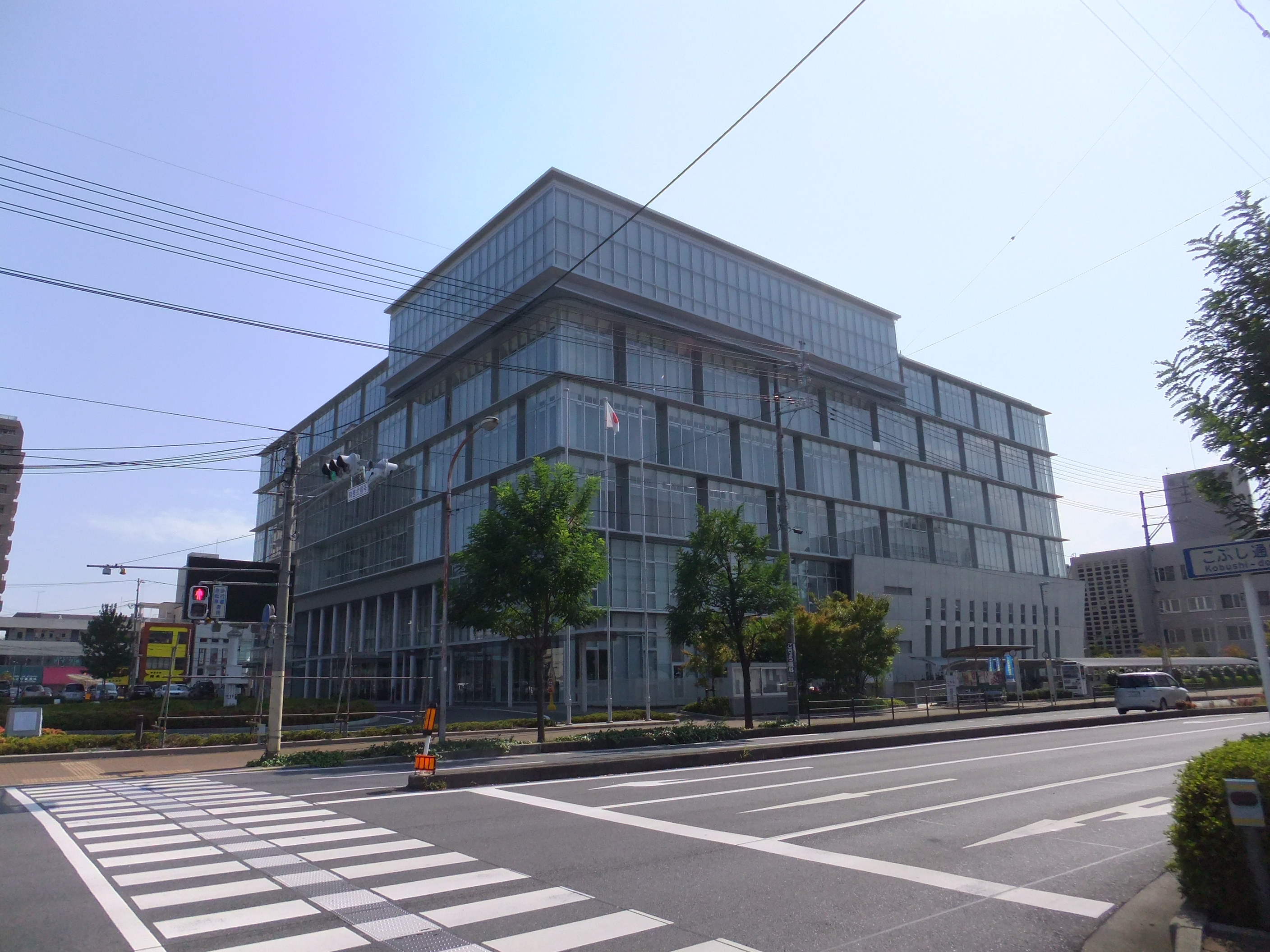
Iwakuni City Hall

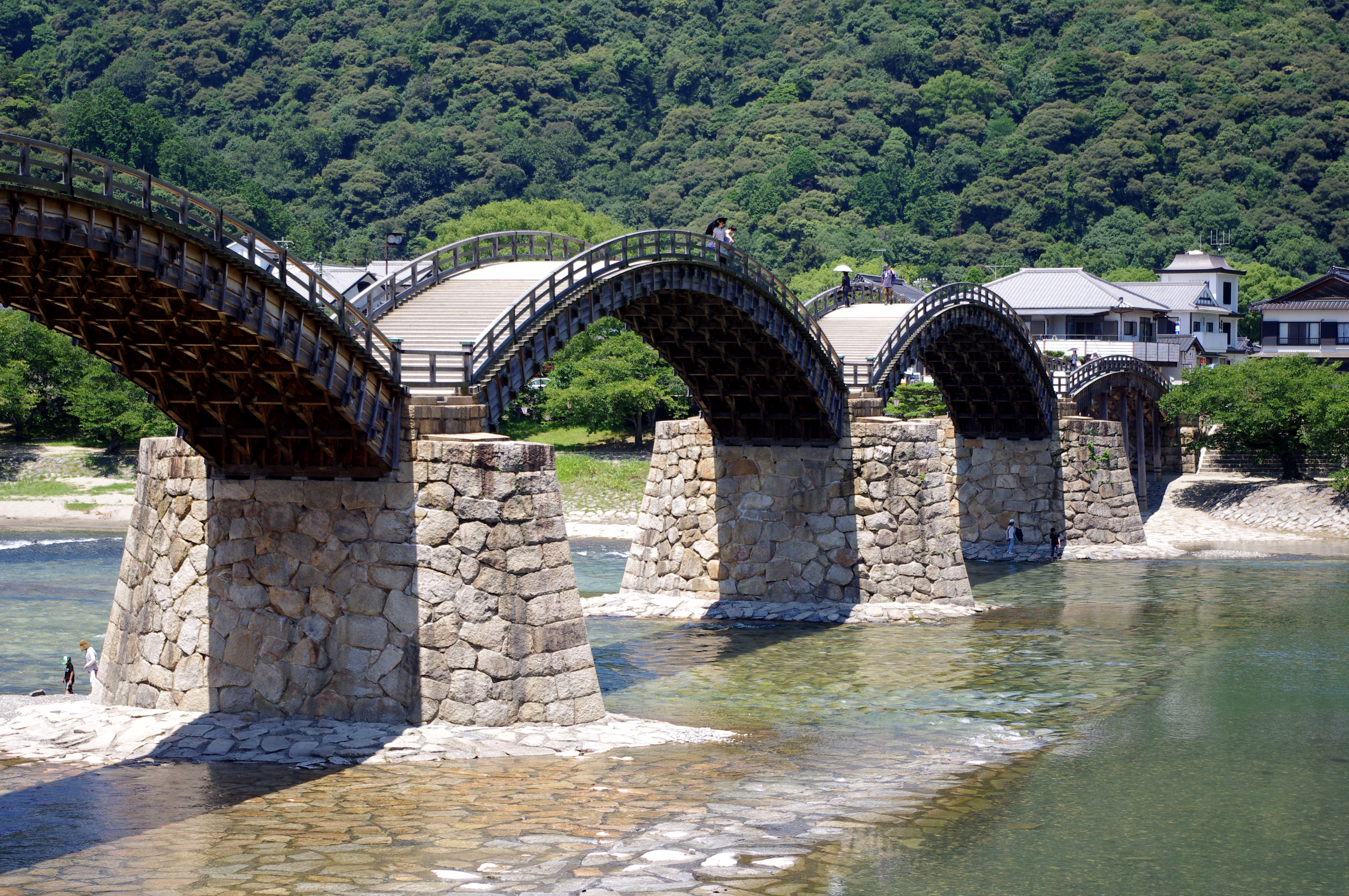
Kintai Bridge

Iwakuni city center

Iwakuni (岩国市, Iwakuni-shi; Japanese pronunciation: [ì.β̞ä́.kɯ̈̀.ɲ̟ì, -kɯ̈́.ɲ̟í.ɕì]) is a city located in Yamaguchi Prefecture, Japan. As of 1 June 2023, the city had an estimated population of 127,512 in 65182 households and a population density of 157 people per km^{2}. The total area of the city is 873.72 square kilometers (337.35 sq mi).

== Geography ==
Iwakuni is located in the southeastern Yamaguchi Prefecture, bordering Hiroshima Prefecture to the east and the Seto Inland Sea to the south. The Nishiki River flows through the center of the city.

=== Neighbouring municipalities ===
Hiroshima Prefecture

- Hatsukaichi
- Ōtake

Shimane Prefecture

- Masuda
- Yoshika

Yamaguchi Prefecture

- Hikari
- Shūnan
- Tabuse
- Waki
- Yanai

=== Climate ===
Iwakuni has a humid subtropical climate (Köppen climate classification Cfa) with hot summers and cool winters. Precipitation is significant throughout the year, but is much higher from March to October, which encompasses the monsoon season from June to July, as well as peak typhoon season in September. The average annual temperature in Iwakuni is 15.1 °C (59.2 °F). The average annual rainfall is 1,781.4 mm (70.13 in) with July as the wettest month. The temperatures are highest on average in August, at around 26.9 °C (80.4 °F), and lowest in January, at around 4.2 °C (39.6 °F). The highest temperature ever recorded in Iwakuni was 39.3 °C (102.7 °F) on 31 July 2025; the coldest temperature ever recorded was −12.9 °C (8.8 °F) on 19 February 1977.

Climate data for Iwakuni (1991−2020 normals, extremes 1977−present)
Month	Jan	Feb	Mar	Apr	May	Jun	Jul	Aug	Sep	Oct	Nov	Dec	Year
Record high °C (°F)	18.6 (65.5)	21.4 (70.5)	25.2 (77.4)	29.7 (85.5)	32.8 (91.0)	35.5 (95.9)	38.7 (101.7)	38.0 (100.4)	36.1 (97.0)	32.4 (90.3)	27.0 (80.6)	21.3 (70.3)	38.7 (101.7)
Mean daily maximum °C (°F)	9.0 (48.2)	9.9 (49.8)	13.5 (56.3)	19.0 (66.2)	23.7 (74.7)	26.4 (79.5)	30.5 (86.9)	31.9 (89.4)	28.1 (82.6)	22.6 (72.7)	16.8 (62.2)	11.4 (52.5)	20.2 (68.4)
Daily mean °C (°F)	4.2 (39.6)	4.9 (40.8)	8.2 (46.8)	13.4 (56.1)	18.1 (64.6)	21.8 (71.2)	25.9 (78.6)	26.9 (80.4)	23.1 (73.6)	17.3 (63.1)	11.4 (52.5)	6.3 (43.3)	15.1 (59.2)
Mean daily minimum °C (°F)	0.1 (32.2)	0.5 (32.9)	3.1 (37.6)	8.0 (46.4)	12.9 (55.2)	17.9 (64.2)	22.3 (72.1)	23.0 (73.4)	19.0 (66.2)	12.7 (54.9)	6.9 (44.4)	2.1 (35.8)	10.7 (51.3)
Record low °C (°F)	−7.1 (19.2)	−8.3 (17.1)	−5.0 (23.0)	−1.1 (30.0)	3.4 (38.1)	9.3 (48.7)	14.8 (58.6)	15.8 (60.4)	7.5 (45.5)	2.0 (35.6)	−1.1 (30.0)	−5.2 (22.6)	−8.3 (17.1)
Average precipitation mm (inches)	54.3 (2.14)	79.9 (3.15)	145.6 (5.73)	172.8 (6.80)	187.5 (7.38)	274.1 (10.79)	292.1 (11.50)	154.9 (6.10)	182.4 (7.18)	113.7 (4.48)	77.5 (3.05)	62.5 (2.46)	1,781.4 (70.13)
Average precipitation days (≥ 1.0 mm)	6.2	7.3	9.7	9.3	9.4	11.8	11.0	8.5	8.9	6.8	6.4	6.4	101.7
Mean monthly sunshine hours	153.7	150.3	181.3	204.4	220.8	151.8	176.2	217.8	167.0	179.8	159.4	156.5	2,127.2
Source: Japan Meteorological Agency

Climate data for Kuga, Iwakuni (1991−2020 normals, extremes 1977−present)
Month	Jan	Feb	Mar	Apr	May	Jun	Jul	Aug	Sep	Oct	Nov	Dec	Year
Record high °C (°F)	18.8 (65.8)	21.8 (71.2)	26.4 (79.5)	29.2 (84.6)	32.7 (90.9)	35.2 (95.4)	38.1 (100.6)	39.1 (102.4)	36.2 (97.2)	31.5 (88.7)	27.0 (80.6)	21.7 (71.1)	39.1 (102.4)
Mean daily maximum °C (°F)	9.3 (48.7)	10.5 (50.9)	14.2 (57.6)	19.8 (67.6)	24.5 (76.1)	27.0 (80.6)	30.8 (87.4)	32.2 (90.0)	28.5 (83.3)	23.1 (73.6)	17.2 (63.0)	11.6 (52.9)	20.7 (69.3)
Daily mean °C (°F)	3.6 (38.5)	4.6 (40.3)	8.1 (46.6)	13.3 (55.9)	18.1 (64.6)	21.9 (71.4)	25.8 (78.4)	26.8 (80.2)	23.1 (73.6)	17.1 (62.8)	11.0 (51.8)	5.6 (42.1)	14.9 (58.9)
Mean daily minimum °C (°F)	−1.2 (29.8)	−0.6 (30.9)	2.3 (36.1)	7.1 (44.8)	12.3 (54.1)	17.7 (63.9)	22.1 (71.8)	22.8 (73.0)	18.8 (65.8)	12.1 (53.8)	5.7 (42.3)	0.6 (33.1)	10.0 (49.9)
Record low °C (°F)	−8.9 (16.0)	−11.5 (11.3)	−6.4 (20.5)	−3.0 (26.6)	1.7 (35.1)	7.9 (46.2)	14.6 (58.3)	15.5 (59.9)	7.2 (45.0)	0.0 (32.0)	−2.6 (27.3)	−7.2 (19.0)	−11.5 (11.3)
Average precipitation mm (inches)	62.0 (2.44)	90.7 (3.57)	158.9 (6.26)	186.8 (7.35)	211.0 (8.31)	292.2 (11.50)	333.6 (13.13)	166.4 (6.55)	183.6 (7.23)	110.3 (4.34)	82.9 (3.26)	66.0 (2.60)	1,944.3 (76.55)
Average precipitation days (≥ 1.0 mm)	6.6	8.0	10.0	9.8	9.4	12.0	11.3	8.9	9.1	6.6	7.1	6.7	105.5
Mean monthly sunshine hours	147.0	144.0	176.6	190.9	201.6	139.4	156.7	194.7	162.9	178.1	154.9	149.0	1,989.1
Source: Japan Meteorological Agency

Climate data for Hirose, Iwakuni (1991−2020 normals, extremes 1976−present)
Month	Jan	Feb	Mar	Apr	May	Jun	Jul	Aug	Sep	Oct	Nov	Dec	Year
Record high °C (°F)	18.7 (65.7)	21.4 (70.5)	28.2 (82.8)	30.3 (86.5)	34.4 (93.9)	36.2 (97.2)	39.3 (102.7)	39.1 (102.4)	36.8 (98.2)	32.0 (89.6)	29.1 (84.4)	20.5 (68.9)	39.3 (102.7)
Mean daily maximum °C (°F)	8.4 (47.1)	9.9 (49.8)	14.0 (57.2)	19.8 (67.6)	24.6 (76.3)	27.1 (80.8)	30.7 (87.3)	32.1 (89.8)	28.1 (82.6)	22.6 (72.7)	16.6 (61.9)	10.7 (51.3)	20.4 (68.7)
Daily mean °C (°F)	2.8 (37.0)	3.8 (38.8)	7.3 (45.1)	12.7 (54.9)	17.5 (63.5)	21.4 (70.5)	25.3 (77.5)	26.1 (79.0)	22.1 (71.8)	16.0 (60.8)	10.0 (50.0)	4.8 (40.6)	14.2 (57.5)
Mean daily minimum °C (°F)	−1.0 (30.2)	−0.7 (30.7)	2.0 (35.6)	6.6 (43.9)	11.6 (52.9)	17.0 (62.6)	21.5 (70.7)	22.1 (71.8)	18.0 (64.4)	11.5 (52.7)	5.6 (42.1)	1.0 (33.8)	9.6 (49.3)
Record low °C (°F)	−10.3 (13.5)	−12.9 (8.8)	−6.3 (20.7)	−3.0 (26.6)	0.1 (32.2)	5.4 (41.7)	12.9 (55.2)	13.7 (56.7)	4.9 (40.8)	0.2 (32.4)	−2.8 (27.0)	−8.4 (16.9)	−12.9 (8.8)
Average precipitation mm (inches)	85.8 (3.38)	108.1 (4.26)	181.9 (7.16)	210.6 (8.29)	246.8 (9.72)	311.3 (12.26)	370.3 (14.58)	207.7 (8.18)	213.4 (8.40)	126.7 (4.99)	97.0 (3.82)	89.9 (3.54)	2,263.4 (89.11)
Average precipitation days (≥ 1.0 mm)	10.6	10.9	11.7	10.2	9.4	12.6	12.6	10.7	10.1	7.2	8.3	10.5	124.8
Mean monthly sunshine hours	106.9	119.9	162.7	182.7	207.5	144.7	146.0	180.0	151.3	165.1	129.0	106.3	1,802
Source: Japan Meteorological Agency

=== Demographics ===
As of August 1, 2016, the city has an estimated population of 137,128 (which the city has decreased in population by 50,000 over the last 25 years) and a population density of 156.95 of persons per km^{2}. The total area is 873.72 km^{2}.

Historical population
Year	Pop.	±%
1950	149,965	—
1955	162,518	+8.4%
1960	165,498	+1.8%
1965	162,015	−2.1%
1970	157,338	−2.9%
1975	161,103	+2.4%
1980	163,692	+1.6%
1985	161,682	−1.2%
1990	158,293	−2.1%
1995	156,347	−1.2%
2000	153,985	−1.5%
2005	149,702	−2.8%
2010	143,888	−3.9%
2015	136,757	−5.0%
2020	129,125	−5.6%
Iwakuni population statistics

== History ==
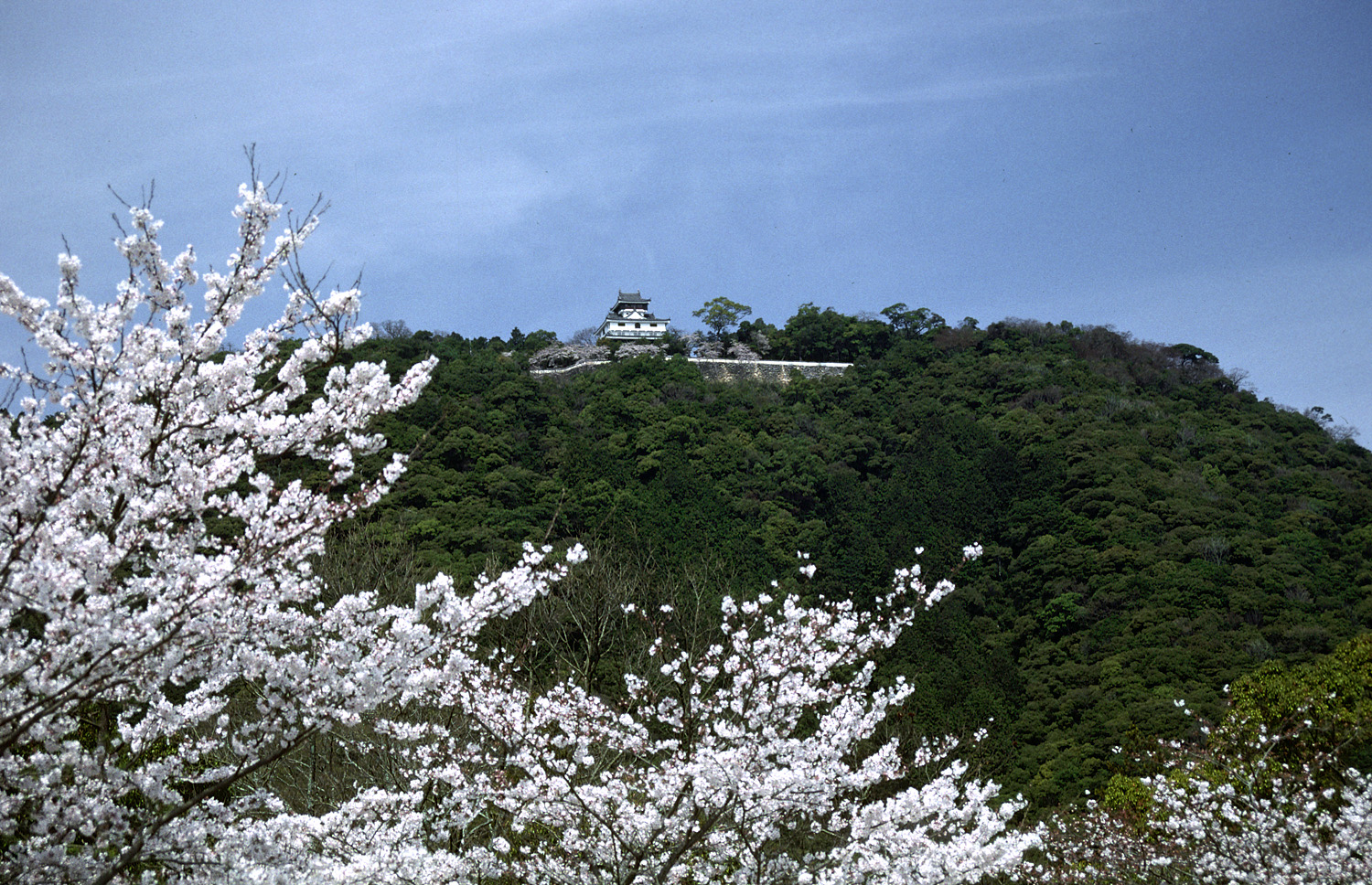
Iwakuni Castle

The area of present-day Iwakuni was part of the ancient Suō Province. During the Sengoku period, it was part of the holdings of the Mōri clan: however, after the defeat of the Western Army at the Battle of Sekigahara in 1600, the area around Iwakuni was granted to warlord Kikkawa Hiroie for his role in keeping the Mōri army from taking part in the battle and so preventing the complete attainder of the Mōri holdings under the Tokugawa shogunate. The Kikkawa clan built Iwakuni Castle and the core of the modern city developed from the castle town which arose around its ramparts. Iwakuni Domain had a kokudaka of 60,000 koku, but was regarded as a semi-independent component of Chōshū Domain until the Meiji restoration.

=== Municipal mergers ===
The town of Iwakuni was established on April 1, 1889, within Kuga District, Yamaguchi with the creation of the modern municipalities system. It was raised to city status on April 1, 1940. On March 20, 2006, Iwakuni absorbed the towns of Kuga, Mikawa, Miwa, Nishiki, Shūtō and Yū, and the village of Hongō (all from Kuga District) to create the new and expanded city of Iwakuni.

== Government ==
Iwakuni has a mayor-council form of government with a directly elected mayor and a unicameral city council of 30 members. Iwakuni contributes five members to the Yamaguchi Prefectural Assembly. In terms of national politics, the city is part of the Yamaguchi 2nd district of the lower house of the Diet of Japan.

== Economy ==
Iwakuni is part of the Seto Inland Sea industrial area. Petroleum is a major industry with Nippon Oil's Marifu refinery producing 127,000 barrels per day (20,200 m^{3}/d). Pulp is also produced in Nippon Paper's Iwakuni mill using a relatively new process called "methane fermentation treatment" which requires almost no energy. Other main industries include fibers and spinning, petrochemicals, and paper. The renkon (lotus root) is the principal agricultural product and is cultivated in the Hasuda field which is in the Ozu area, located near Minami Iwakuni station.

== Education ==
Iwakuni has 35 public elementary school and 15 public junior high schools and one combined elementary/junior high school operated by the city government, and one junior high school and five public high schools operated by the Yamaguchi Prefectural Board of Education. There are also one private junior high and three private high schools. The prefecture also operates one special education school for the handicapped. The private Iwakuni Junior College is located in Iwakuni.

One high school, Iwakuni-Kogyo, is the alma mater of Shinji Mori who was a Major League Baseball player with the Tampa Bay Rays in 2005. He was part of the 1993 graduating class.

== Transportation ==
=== Airport ===
- Marine Corps Air Station Iwakuni – A civilian passenger terminal was completed in 2012. Scheduled daily commercial flights to Tokyo started December 13, 2012.

=== Railway ===
JR West – San'yō Shinkansen

- Shin-Iwakuni

JR West (JR West) - San'yō Main Line

- Iwakuni - Minami-Iwakuni - Fujū - Tsuzu - Yū - Kōjiro

JR West (JR West) - Gantoku Line

- Iwakuni - Nishi-Iwakuni - Kawanishi - Hashirano - Kimmeiji - Kuga - Suō-Takamori - Yonekawa

Nishikigawa Railway - Seiryū Line

- Iwakuni - Nishi-Iwakuni - Kawanishi - Seiryū-Shin-Iwakuni - Shuuchi-Kasagami - Minami-Gōchi - Yukaba - Kita-Gōchi - Mukuno - Naguwa - Seiryu Miharashi - Nekasa - Kawayama - Yanaze - Nishikichō

=== Highways ===
- San'yō Expressway
- Chugoku Expressway
- National Route 2
- National Route 187
- National Route 188
- National Route 189
- National Route 376
- National Route 434
- National Route 437

== Media ==
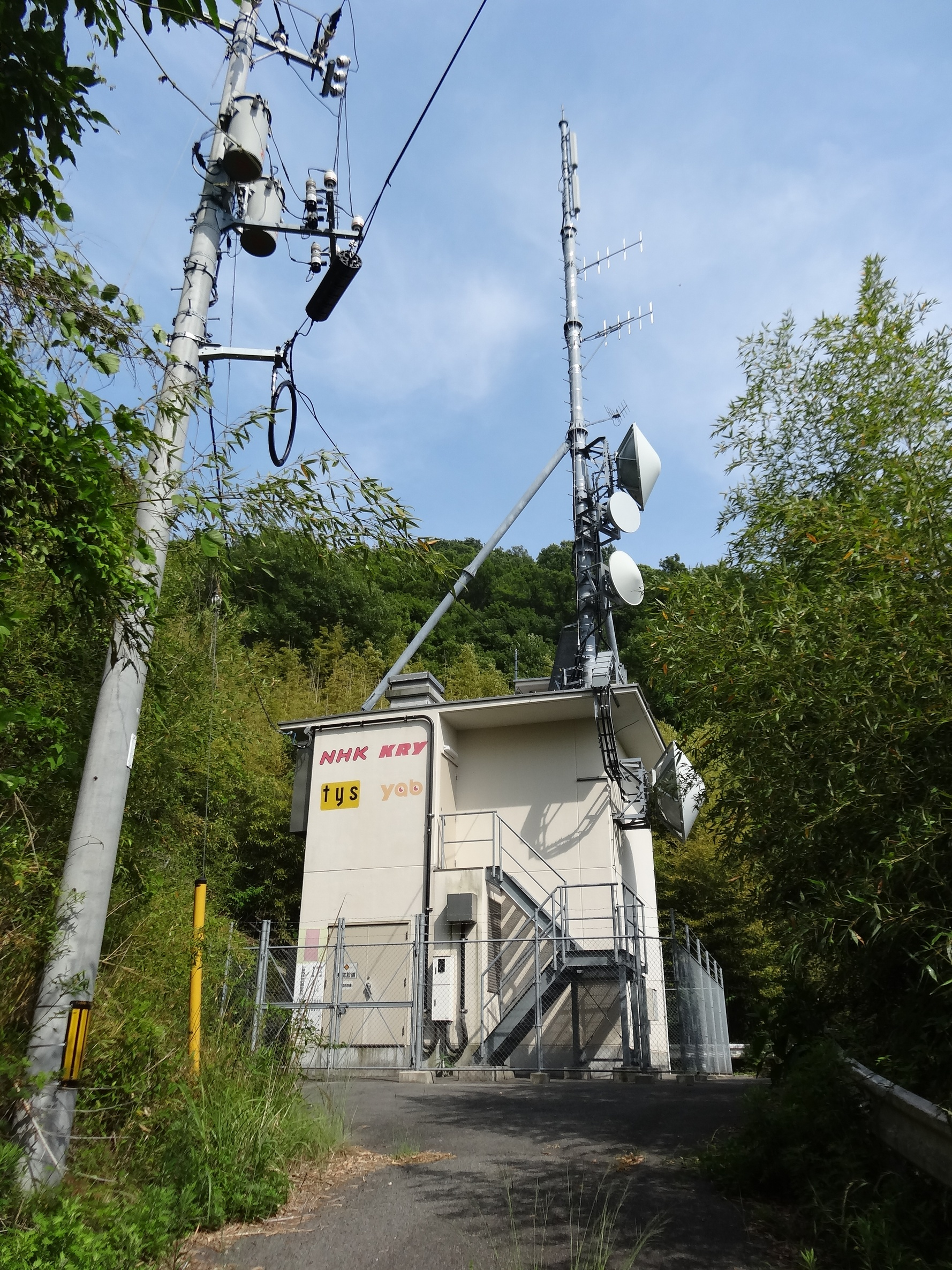
Repeater station in Iwakuni

=== Newspaper ===
- Stars and Stripes (On-base)
- Yamaguchi Shimbun

=== TV ===
- YAB TV (ANN)
- KRY TV (NNN)
- TYS TV (JNN)
- NHK TV

== Sports ==
Iwakuni is home to Hiroshima Toyo Carp's minor league team. The team's ball park, Yuu Baseball Ground is located approximately 20 kilometres (12 mi) southwest of central Iwakuni in the Yū neighborhood.

== Sister city relations ==
- Everett, Washington, United States
- Jundiaí, Brazil
- Taicang, China
- Tottori

== Local attractions ==
Tourists from both Japan and overseas who visit Hiroshima and Miyajima often extend their travels to include Iwakuni.

=== Kintai Bridge ===
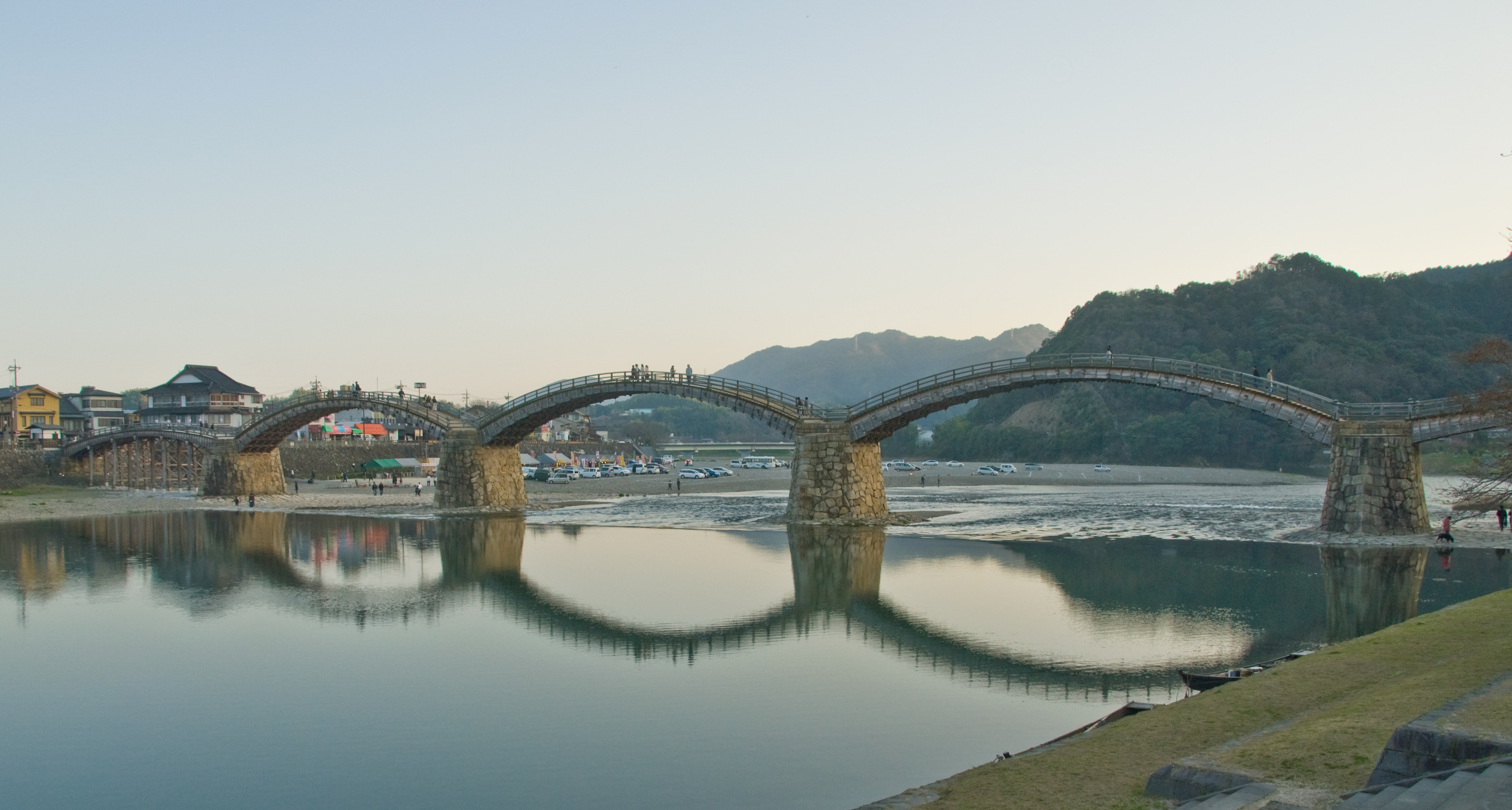
Kintai Bridge, or Kintaikyō.

The famous Kintai Bridge (Kintai-kyō) is the city's most popular sightseeing spot. The Kintai Bridge spans the Nishiki River and was first constructed in 1673 by Hiroyoshi Kikkawa. The bridge stood until September 14, 1950, when it was destroyed by the typhoon "Kijiya". The bridge began being rebuilt only a week later and was completed in 1953. It was a recreation of the original and was built using traditional techniques. Since the first reconstruction, the Kintai Bridge has undergone some renovation. The latest renovation was completed in 2004. Its five arches are a symbol of western Honshū. The Kintai Bridge is about 20 minutes from Iwakuni Station by bus and about 15 minutes from Shin-Iwakuni Station of Sanyo-Shinkansen. Several buses provide service from Iwakuni and Shin-Iwakuni Station to the Kintai Bridge every day.

=== Kikko Park ===
Kikko Park is located on the other side of the Kintai Bridge. This area used to be the residence of the Kikkawa family. The park has a big fountain and contains numerous shops as well as a variety of flowers. Kikko Park is also home to a sanctuary for white snakes. These snakes are found only in Iwakuni, and have been designated as special national treasures by the Japanese government. The white snake is a symbol of Benten, the Japanese goddess of wealth. The white snake is considered a sign of good luck in Japan. Many people come to pray to the snakes so that they might be successful in their businesses.

=== Imazu White Snake Museum ===
In Japanese folklore, if a white snake is found in your home it is said to bring good fortune. The white snakes found in Iwakuni are usually the albino variety of the Japanese Rat Snake. They are gentle ivory white snakes with ruby colored eyes which can only be found in concentration at Iwakuni. There is a viewing facility near Kikko Park.

=== Iwakuni Castle ===
Iwakuni Castle (Momoyama Nanban-zukuri), as well as the preserved temples and buildings at the foot of the hill, provide a glimpse into old Japan. The castle was originally constructed in 1608 by Hiroie Kikkawa, but was destroyed only seven years later. It was reconstructed in 1962. Iwakuni Castle is situated at the top of Mount Shiroyama, and can be reached on foot or by cable car. The castle includes a history museum containing armor, weapons, and other artifacts of the Kikkawa family. From atop of the castle, there is an impressive view of Iwakuni. The castle area also offers several trails for hiking and exercise.

=== Cormorant fishing ===
On the Nishiki river, traditional cormorant fishing can be seen in the summertime. Fishermen wearing traditional clothing such as the noble's headgear called "kazaore eboshi", aprons, straw skirts, and straw sandals, perform this more-than-300-year-old fishing technique. The fishermen control the cormorant, making them catch a fish, which is then retrieved from the cormorant's mouth by the fisherman. Also, in early spring, the sight of cherry blossoms along the Nishiki river is unforgettable.

=== Other places ===
The Mekata Residence was the home of a mid-ranking samurai family from the 18th century. It is one of the last few remaining and so it is considered national property.

The Momijidani Maple Park used to be the garden of a temple. Located near the beginning of a mountain trail, many visitors come each autumn to view the colorful leaves on the many maple trees here.

The Nagayamon Gate of the Kagawa Family Residence is another well preserved piece of history. The appearance of this samurai residence has also been well kept and is considered prefectural cultural property.

The Iwakuni Art Museum contains ceramics, armor, furniture, and other artifacts which were once used by feudal lords.

Iwakuni also offers several different kinds of plants and trees which people like to view. In addition to the cherry trees and maple trees along the Nishiki river, there are also Japanese apricot trees, peony bushes, azalea, Japanese iris, and hydrangea. Many of these plants and trees are located around Kikko Park.

=== Festivals ===
The Kintai Bridge Festival is held annually on April 29 at Kikko Park. The festival includes a parade across the bridge called the "Sankin-koutai" Feudal Lords' Procession featuring locals dressed in historic samurai costumes. The date of this festival is subject to some controversy as it is former emperor Hirohito's birthday. From the death of Hirohito in 1989 until 2005, the day was officially called "Greenery Day". In 2005, it was voted to change the name to "Showa Day" in reference to Hirohito despite the fear of opposition from other countries such as China and North Korea and South Korea, against which war crimes were committed under the direction of the late emperor. However, according to the Liberal Democratic Party, this day would "encourage public reflection of the turbulent 63 years of Hirohito's reign, rather than glorify the emperor himself".

The Nishiki River Water Festival is held on the first Saturday of every August. There is a large fireworks display and many people attend dressed in traditional clothing such as kimono.

== Cuisine ==
Visitors to Iwakuni may also wish to sample the town's special local version of sushi, which is made in a square mold. What is unique about this sushi is that it is prepared in large amounts, generally enough to feed about 150 people. There are also many "sushi-go-rounds" where sushi makes its way around the restaurant for patrons to pick and choose from via a moving belt.

Iwakuni is famous for fresh lotus roots which many people enjoy. Lotus roots grown in Iwakuni typically have nine holes, as opposed to lotus roots grown elsewhere, which typically have eight holes. These are cooked in different ways such as sautéed, simmered, or deep-fried.

Iwakuni Chagayu is a tea-flavored rice porridge originally created about 400 years ago by Hiroie Kikkawa as an inexpensive means of providing food for his subordinates. The tea which was originally used to flavor the chagayu is called "bancha". Although a simple dish, this food has a long history in Iwakuni.

Ohira is a dish with simmered vegetables as well as wild plants and chicken.

=== Other products ===
The Ishi ningyo is a hand-made stone doll which is made from the nests of an insect called "ningyoutobikera" which are found in the rivers in Iwakuni. The dolls have been said to be the incarnations of the souls of ones who died during the construction of the Kintai bridge. People buy these dolls as souvenirs.

Kikkougama Iwakuni-yaki is ceramic ware that was used during the time of the Iwakuni han about 300 years ago that is still produced today. It is noted for its elegance and warm texture.

== Military aviation ==
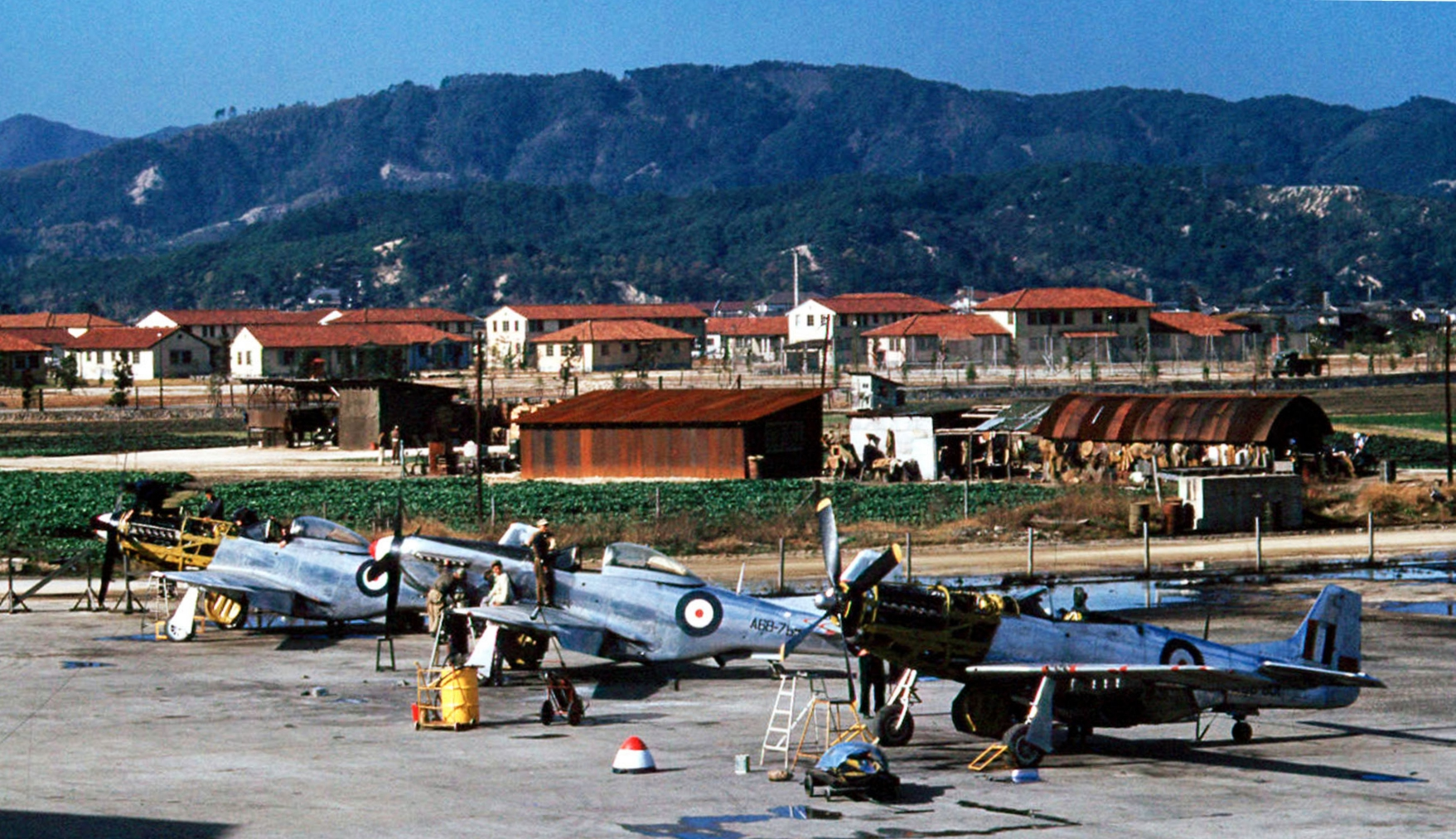
Mustang fighters from No. 77 Squadron, Royal Australian Air Force undergoing maintenance at RAAF Iwakuni, c. 1950–51.

There has been a military airfield at Iwakuni since the 1930's. The area was all farmland and villages until the Japanese government bought a large portion of it in 1938, with the view of establishing a naval air station. The new base was officially commissioned on July 8, 1940. When World War II started, the Iwakuni air station was used as a training and defense base. The station housed 96 trainers and 150 Zero fighter planes on the airstrip. In September 1943, a branch of the Etajima Naval Academy was established here, with approximately 1,000 cadets undergoing training in the Basic, Junior and Senior Officer's schools at any one time. After World War II, the base was occupied by units of the Royal Australian Air Force as part of the British Commonwealth Occupation Force in Japan.

In 1952, the base officially became an air station of the United States Marine Corps. Marine Corps Air Station (MCAS) Iwakuni is also shared with the Japanese Maritime Self Defense Force. MCAS Iwakuni has an air station that many people in Iwakuni want to be made into a public international airport. However, as of 2009, it is only authorized for military use.

Iwakuni is the only US Marine Corps base on Honshu, the main island of Japan. Iwakuni is home to approximately half of the 1st Marine Aircraft Wing headquartered on Okinawa, elements of the 3rd Marine Logistics Group, and Fleet Air Wing 31 of the Japan Maritime Self Defense Force, according to the command website. In 2017, the base is home to about 15,000 U.S. military and Japanese defense force employees.

In 2014, it was planned to move the U.S. Carrier Air Wing from Naval Air Facility Atsugi to Iwakuni which will further increase the size of the base. The US Navy announced on Friday August 18, 2017 that the first jet squadrons from Carrier Air Wing (CVW) 5, nicknamed "the nation's 911 air wing" will relocate to Marine Corps Air Station Iwakuni in the fall of 2017. CVW-5 is the US Navy's only forward-deployed carrier strike group.

== Notable people from Iwakuni ==
- Matthew Heafy, lead vocalist of the American heavy metal band Trivium, was born in Iwakuni in 1986.
- Hideo Hiraoka, politician
- Kenshi Hirokane, manga artist
- Yamato Kochi, actor
- Takeo Kurusu, politician
- Keiichi Nanba, voice actor
- Arisaka Nariakira, lieutenant general in the Imperial Japanese Army and inventor of the Arisaka Rifle
- Ryūtarō Ōtomo, actor
- Masato Sako, actor
- Naoto Tajima, who won gold in the triple jump (setting a new world record in that event), and bronze in the long jump, in the 1936 Summer Olympics in Berlin, was born in Iwakuni.
- Hasegawa Yoshimichi, general in the Imperial Japanese Army
