= Shūtō, Yamaguchi =

Dissolved municipality in Yamaguchi prefecture, Japan

Shūtō (周東町, Shūtō-chō) was a town located in Kuga District, Yamaguchi Prefecture, Japan.

As of 2003, the town had an estimated population of 14,396 and a density of 99.96 persons per km^{2}. The total area was 144.02 km^{2}.

On March 20, 2006, Shūtō, along with the towns of Kuga, Mikawa, Miwa, Nishiki and Yū, and the village of Hongō (all from Kuga District), was merged into the expanded city of Iwakuni.
