= Kuga, Yamaguchi =

Former town in Kuga District, Japan

Kuga (玖珂町, Kuga-chō) was a town located in Kuga District, Yamaguchi Prefecture, Japan.

As of 2003, the town had an estimated population of 11,360 and a density of 489.66 persons per km^{2}. The total area was 23.20 km^{2}.

On March 20, 2006, Kuga, along with the towns of Mikawa, Miwa, Nishiki, Shūtō and Yū, and the village of Hongō (all from Kuga District), was merged into the expanded city of Iwakuni.
