= Nishiki, Yamaguchi =

Dissolved municipality in Yamaguchi prefecture, Japan

Nishiki (錦町, Nishiki-chō) was a town located in Kuga District, Yamaguchi Prefecture, Japan.

As of 2003, the town had an estimated population of 4,042 and a density of 19.22 persons per km^{2}. The total area was 210.32 km^{2}.

On March 20, 2006, Nishiki, along with the towns of Kuga, Mikawa, Miwa, Shūtō and Yū, and the village of Hongō (all from Kuga District), was merged into the expanded city of Iwakuni.
