= Kawayama Station =

Railway station in Iwakuni, Yamaguchi Prefecture, Japan

Kawayama Station 河山駅
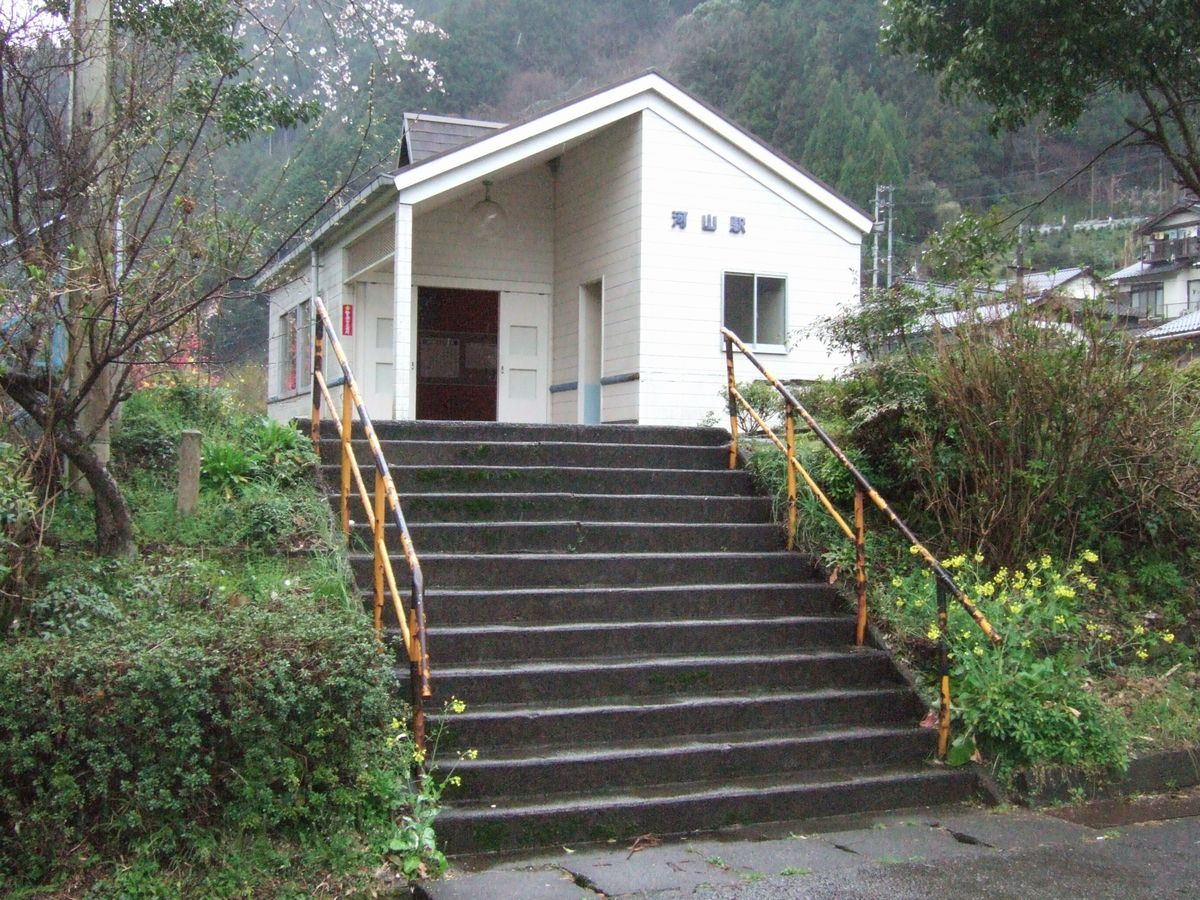
- Nishikigawa Railway Nishikigawa Seiryu Line: Kawayama Station building (entrance side) Source: Photographed by Westwind at Kawayama Station on March 27, 2007.

General information
- Location: Mikawa-machi Shimegami, Iwakuni, Yamaguchi （山口県岩国市美川町四馬神） Japan
- Coordinates: 34°14′10″N 131°59′03″E
- Operator: Nishikigawa Railway
- Line: Nishikigawa Seiryū Line
- Distance: 27.9 km from Kawanishi
- Connections: Bus stop

History
- Opened: 1 November 1960

Passengers
- FY2011: 242 daily
Location

Kawayama Station (河山駅, Kawayama-eki) is a railway station on the Nishikigawa Seiryū Line in Iwakuni, Yamaguchi Prefecture, Japan. It is operated by the Nishikigawa Railway, a third-sector railway company.

== Lines ==
The station is served by the Nishikigawa Seiryū Line and is located 27.9 km from the start of the line at Kawanishi.

== Adjacent stations ==
«	Service	»
Nishikigawa Seiryū Line
Nekasa	-	Yanaze

== History ==
Japanese National Railways (JNR) opened the station on 1 November 1960 as the terminus of the then Gannichi Line (岩日線, Gannichi-sen) from Kawanishi. It became a through-station on 1 October 1963 when the line was extended to Nishiki-chō. With the privatization of JNR on 1 April 1987, control of the station passed to JR West which then ceded control to Nishikigawa Railway on 25 July 1987.

== Passenger statistics ==
In fiscal 2011, the station was used by an average of 242 passengers daily.
