= Kawanishi Station (Yamaguchi) =

Railway station in Iwakuni, Yamaguchi Prefecture, Japan

Kawanishi Station 川西駅
- Kawanishi Station in May 2026

General information
- Location: 2-chōme-8 Kawanishi, Iwakuni-shi, Yamaguchi-ken 741-0082; Japan
- Coordinates: 34°9′23.96″N 132°10′38.54″E
- Owner: West Japan Railway Company
- Operator: West Japan Railway Company; Nishikigawa Railway
- Line: Gantoku Line Nishikigawa Seiryū Line
- Distance: 5.6 km (3.5 miles) from Iwakuni
- Platforms: 1 side platform
- Tracks: 1
- Connections: Bus stop

Other information
- Status: Unstaffed
- Website: Official website

History
- Opened: 16 April 1960; 66 years ago

Passengers
- FY2020: 425
Location
- Location within Yamaguchi Prefecture Location within Japan

Kawanishi Station (川西駅, Kawanishi-eki) is a passenger railway station located in the city of Iwakuni, Yamaguchi Prefecture, Japan. It is operated jointly by the West Japan Railway Company (JR West) and the third sector Nishikigawa Railway.

== Lines ==
Kawanishi Station is served by the JR West Gantoku Line, and is located 5.6 kilometers from the terminus of the line at Iwakuni. It is also the nominal terminus of the 32.7 kilometer Nishikigawa Seiryū Line from Nishikichō, although all trains continue past Kawanishi Station on the Gantoku Line tracks to terminate at Iwakuni.

== Station layout ==
The station consists of one side platform serving a single bi-directional track. The station is unattended.

== Adjacent stations ==
«	Service	»
JR West
Gantoku Line
Nishi-Iwakuni	-	Hashirano
Nishikigawa Railway
Nishikigawa Seiryū Line
Nishi-Iwakuni	-	Mishō

== History ==
Kawanishi Station was opened on 16 April 1960. With the privatization of the Japan National Railway (JNR) on 1 April 1987, the station came under the aegis of the West Japan railway Company (JR West).

== Passenger statistics ==
In fiscal 2020, the station was used by an average of 425 passengers daily.

== Surrounding area ==
- Yamaguchi Prefectural Iwakuni High School
- Nishiki River
- Kintai Bridge
- Birthplace of Chiyo Uno

== See also ==
- List of railway stations in Japan
