= Yanai Chausuyama Kofun =

- 柳井茶臼山古墳 (Japanese)
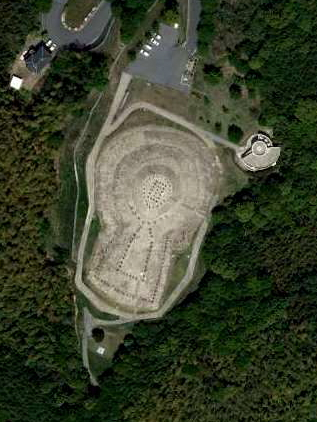
- Yanai Chausuyama Kofun

- Yanai Chausuyama Kofun Yanai Chausuyama Kofun (Japan)
- Interactive map of Yanai Chausuyama Kofun
- 33°57′57″N 132°7′44″E
- Type: Kofun
- Periods: Kofun period
- Location: Yanai, Yamaguchi, Japan
- Region: San'yo region

History
- Built: c.late 4th century

Site notes
- Public access: Yes (no facilities)

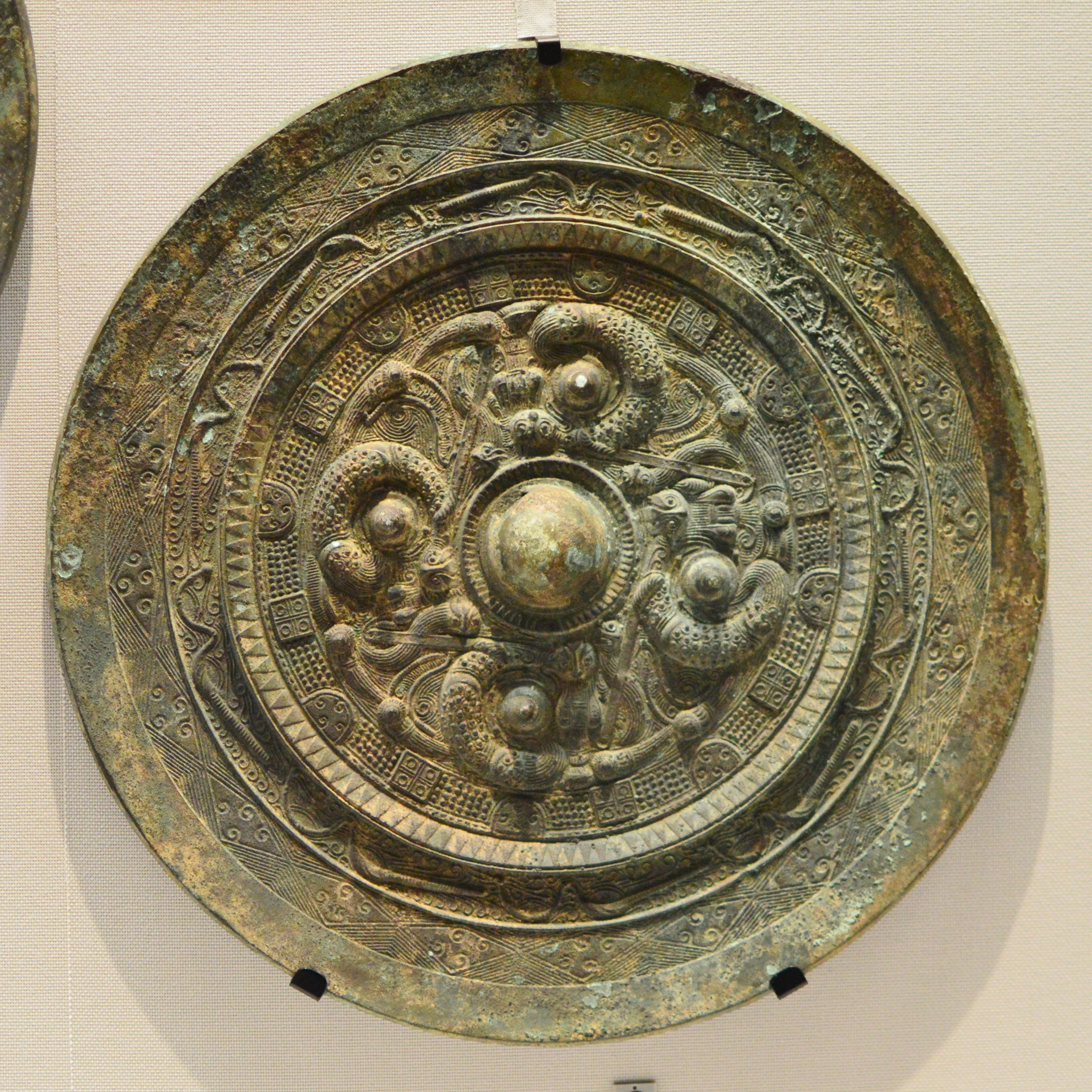
Shinju-kyo bronze mirror from Yanai Chausuyama Kofun now at Tokyo National Museum

Yanai Chausuyama Kofun (柳井茶臼山古墳) is a Kofun period keyhole-shaped burial mound, located in the Yanai neighborhood of the city of Yanai, Yamaguchi in the San'yo region of Japan. The tumulus was designated a National Historic Site of Japan in 1948.

== Overview ==
The Yanai Chausuyama Kofun is a zenpō-kōen-fun (前方後円墳), which is shaped like a keyhole, having one square end and one circular end, when viewed from above. It is located on Mount Mukoyama at an elevation of 75 meters overlooking the Seto Inland Sea. It is 80 meters long, with a posterior circular diameter of 50 meters, and an anterior width of 40 meters and is orientated to the south-southwest. It was excavated in 1892 by local residents, at which time bronze mirrors, iron swords, iron halberds, and other grave goods were discovered. Of the five bronze mirrors, the largest had a diameter of 44.8 centimeters and is preserved at the Tokyo National Museum along with one other example. Another is at the Yamaguchi Prefectural Museum and one more is at the Chausuyama Burial Mound Museum. The whereabouts of the remaining one is unknown, and most of the other artifacts discovered are in private collections. These artifacts date the tumulus to the end of the fourth century.

In 1991, a second excavation was carried out for the maintenance of the historic site. It was found that the tumulus had been constructed in three tiers, and had fukiishi and rows of cylindrical and house-shaped haniwa. A re-examination of the pit-type burial chamber found a large iron sword which had been overlooked in the earlier excavation along with jade magatama, jasper tubuar beads, and bronze mirror fragments. The site is now preserved as a park with an adjacent museum. It is located about 15 minutes on foot from Yanaiminato Station on the JR West San'yō Main Line. It is the second largest kofun in Yamaguchi Prefecture after the Shiratori Kofun in Hirao.

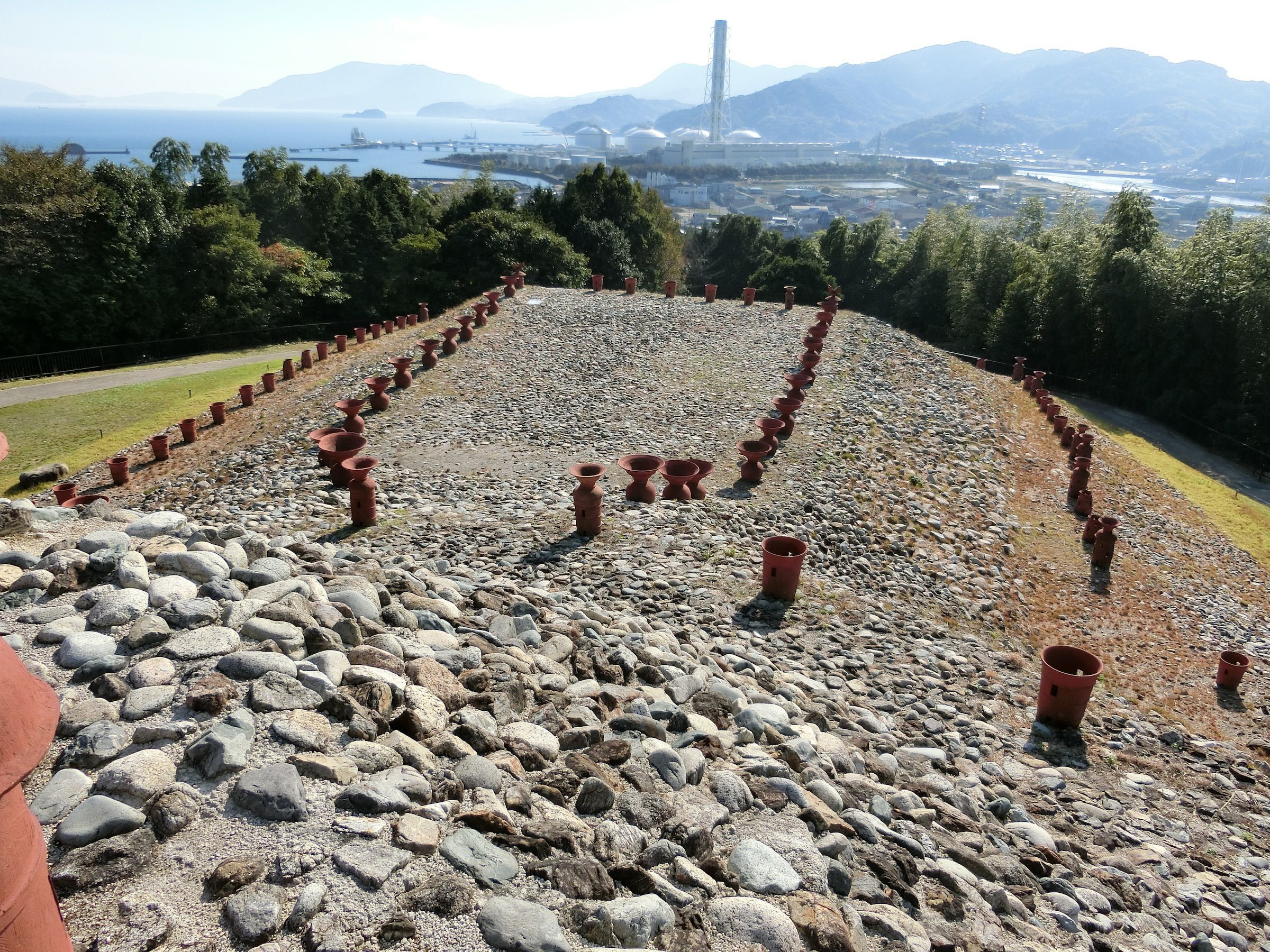
Posterior looking towards anterior

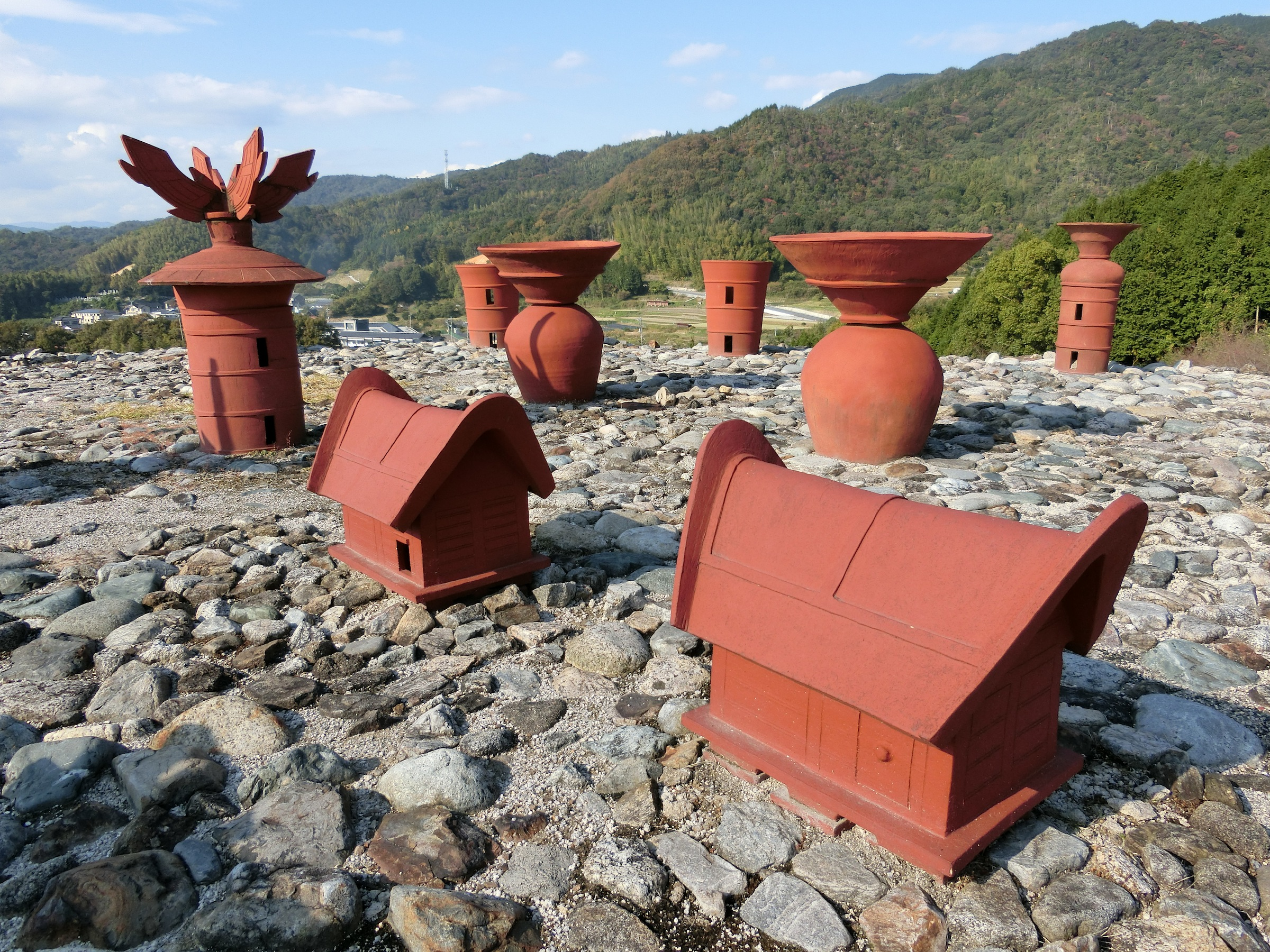
reconstructed haniwa and fukiishi

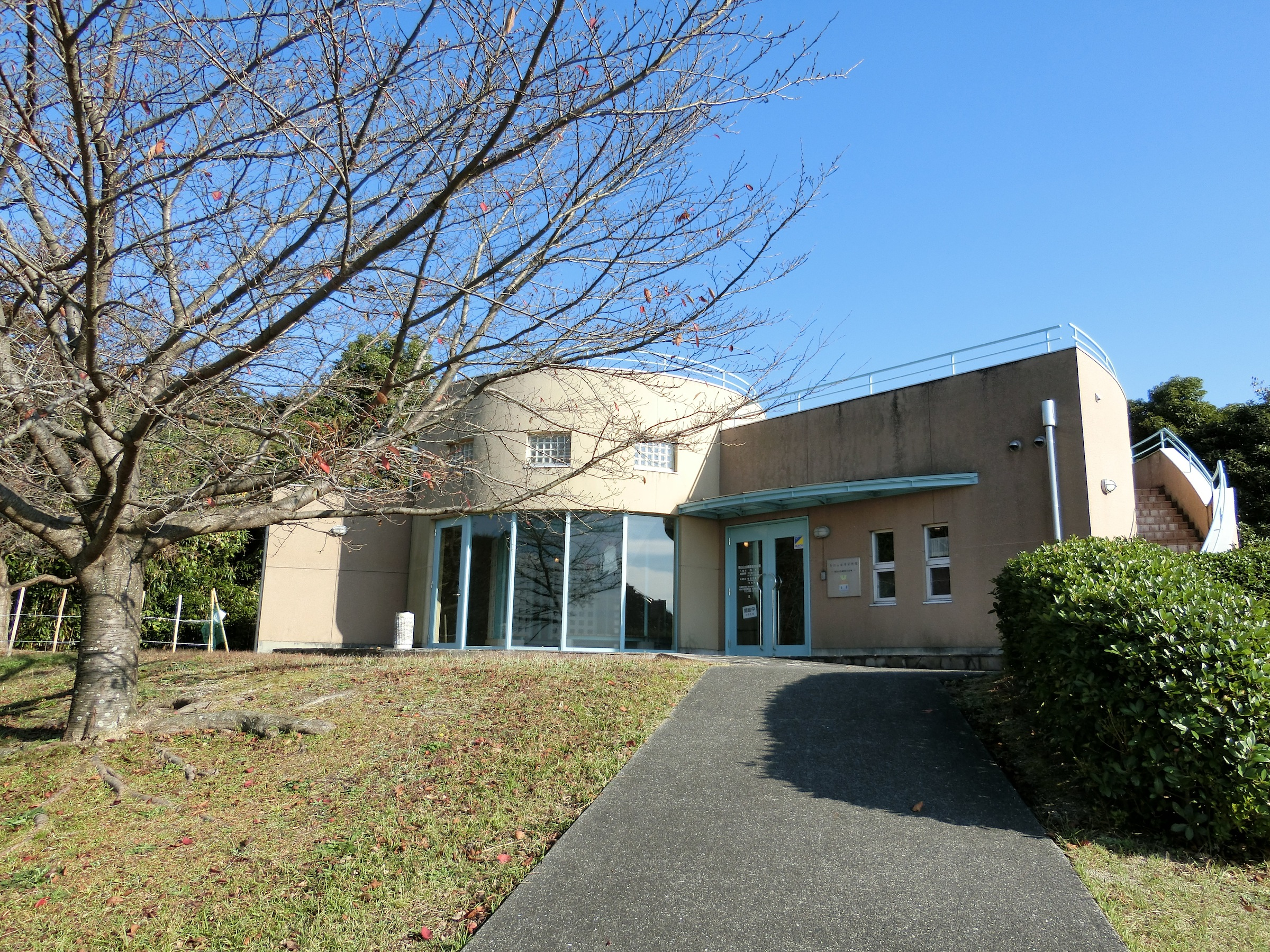
Yanai Chausuyama Kofun Museum

== See also ==
- List of Historic Sites of Japan (Yamaguchi)
