= Shiratori Kofun (Hirao) =

Kofun period burial mound in Hirao, Yamaguchi, Japan

- 白鳥古墳 (Japanese)
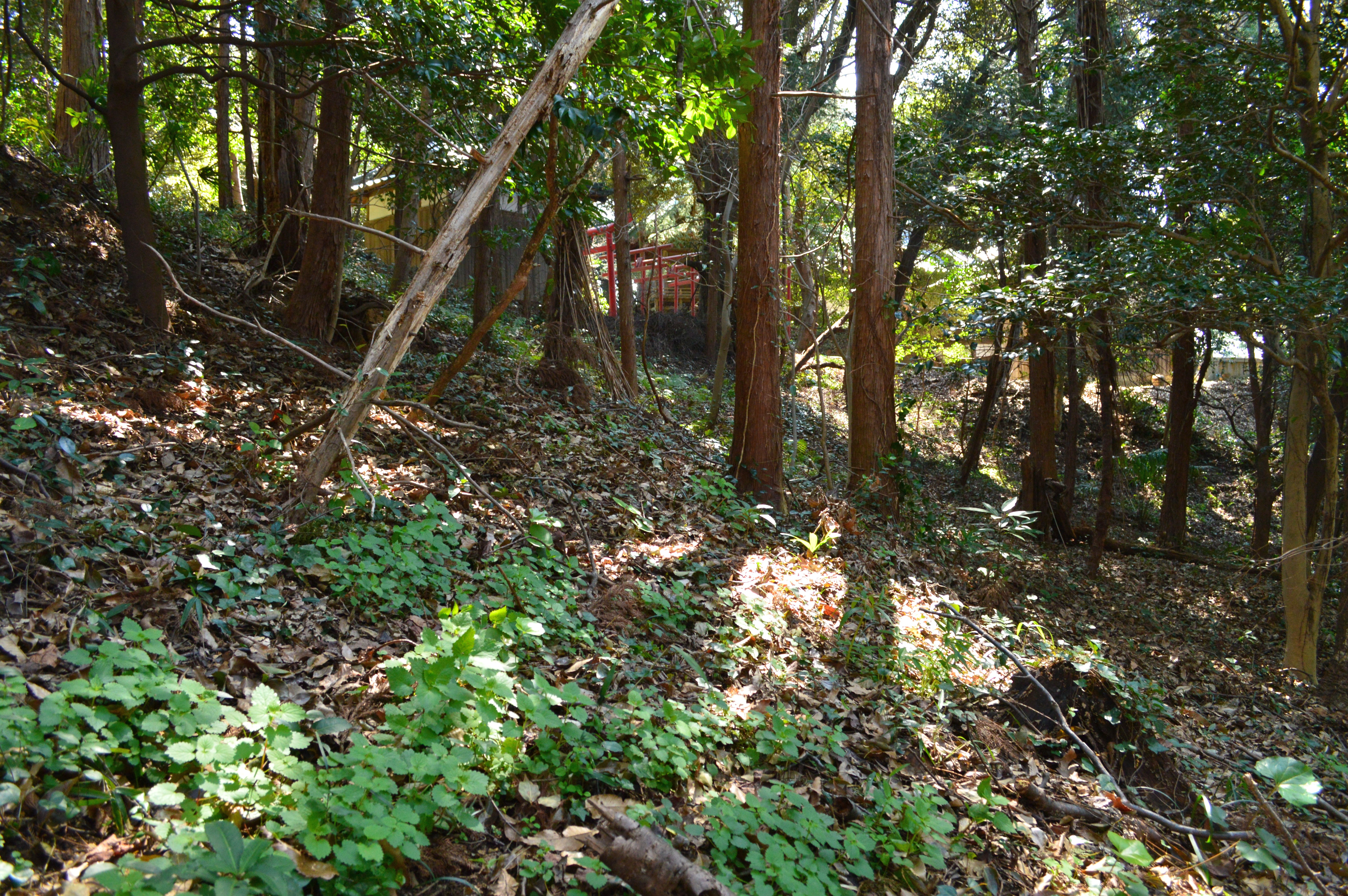
- Shiratori Kofun (front section on the left, rear circular section in the back right).

- Shiratori Kofun Shiratori Kofun (Hirao) (Japan)
- Interactive map of Shiratori Kofun
- 33°53′49.64″N 132°04′47.83″E
- Type: Kofun
- Periods: Kofun period
- Location: Saga Tanaochi, Hirao, Yamaguchi, Japan
- Region: Chugoku region

History
- Built: early 5th century

Site notes
- Public access: yes
- Yamaguchi Prefecture Historic Site

The Shiratori Kofun (白鳥古墳) is a Kofun period burial mound, located in the Saga neighborhood of the town of Hirao, Yamaguchi Prefecture in the Chugoku region of western Japan. The tumulus was designated a Yamaguchi Prefecture Historic Site in 1971. and artifacts from this site have been collectively designated a Yamaguchi Prefecture Tangible Cultural Property. It is the largest burial mound in Yamaguchi Prefecture and is estimated to have been constructed around the first half of the 5th century (mid-Kofun period).

== Overview ==
The Shiratori Kofun is a zenpō-kōen-fun (前方後円墳), which is shaped like a keyhole, having one square end and one circular end, when viewed from above. It is constructed on the tip of a small hill on the western coast of the Murotsu Peninsula in southeastern Yamaguchi Prefecture. A Shinto shrine, the Shiratori Jinja is currently located in the center of the posterior circular portion, which was partially leveled when the shrine was reconstructed in 1749. An archaeological excavation was conducted in 1973.

The burial mound is orientated with the rectangular anterior section facing north-northwest. The burial mound is constructed in three tiers and measures 120 meters in length. It is surrounded by a moat 15-20 meters wide and two meters deep. On the outer surface, in addition to fukiishi revetment stones, fragments of haniwa (cylindrical and figurative haniwa) have been found. The burial facility is believed to have been a vertical shaft stone burial chamber, and Edo Period records indicate that many grave goods were unearthed from a "stone coffin" (possibly a box-shaped stone sarcophagus) inside the burial chamber during the 1749 reconstruction of Shiratori Jinja.

The construction period is estimated to be the first half of the 5th century, during the middle of the Kofun period. The identity of the person buried here is unknown, but it is thought to be the tomb of a chieftain of a powerful clan in the western Setouchi region (possibly the King of Kumage or the Suo no Kuni no miyatsuko family).

Artifacts excavated from the kofun where formerly preserved by the Shiratori Jinja, and are now at the Hirao Town Historical and Folk Museum. These include two bronze mirrors (one "Two gods and two beasts mirror" and one "Four gods and four beasts mirror"), five bronze vessels, five iron axe heads, three iron swords, one iron plohead, eleven tubular beed and one figurative haniwa fragment.

Total length
120 meters
Anterior rectangular portion
60 meters wide x 8.5 meters high
Posterior circular portion
64 meters diameter x 11 meters high, 3 tier

One subsidiary baizuka mound exists approximately 18 meters southwest of the posterior circular section. It is rectangular in shape, with a long axis of approximately 24 meters and a short axis of approximately 14 meters, and is approximately 2.3 meters high. The interior has not been excavated and is unclear; there is also a theory that it is not a subsidiary mound but part of the surrounding embankment of the Shiratori Kofun.

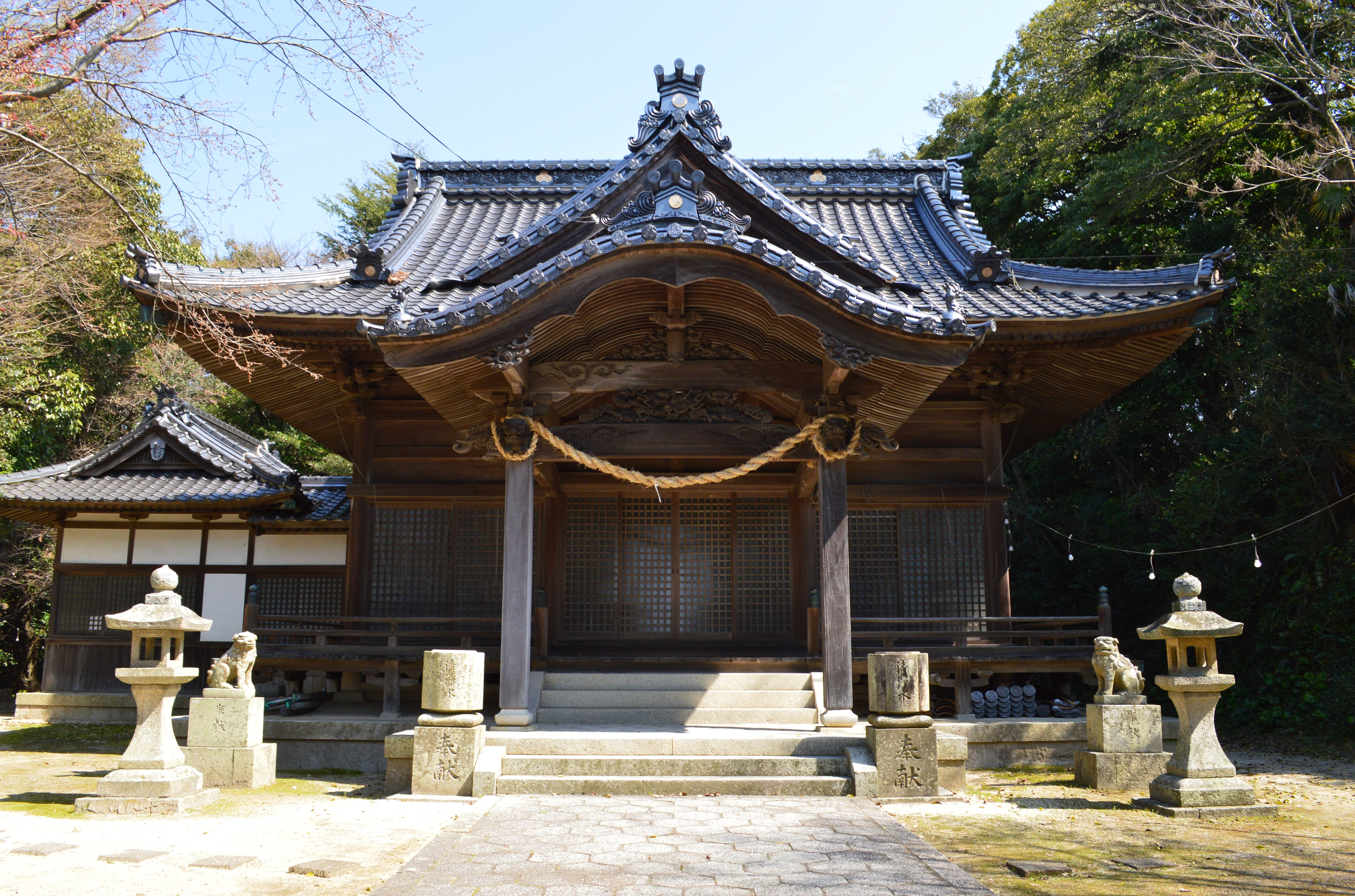
Shiratori Jinja

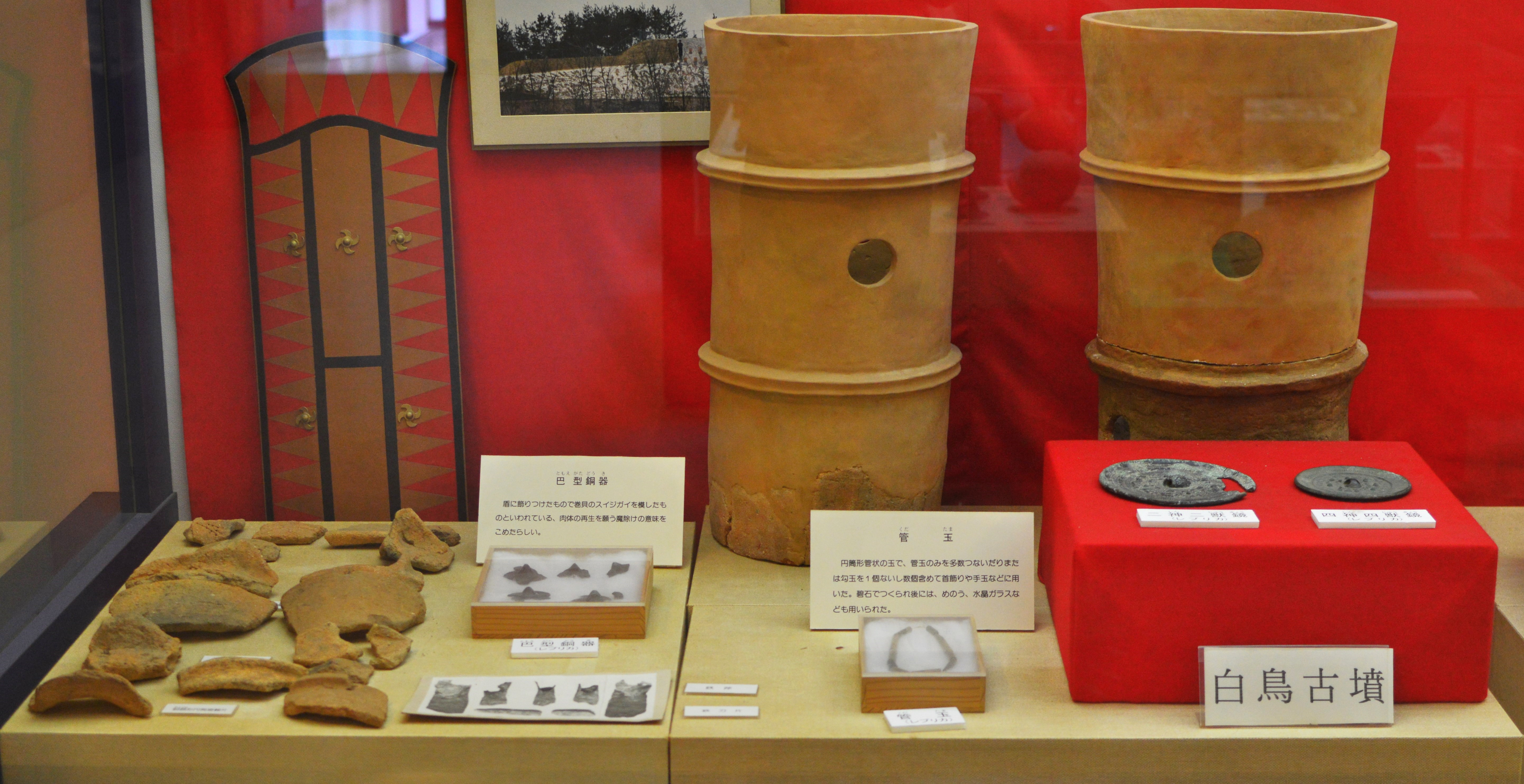
Haniwa from Shiratori Kofun

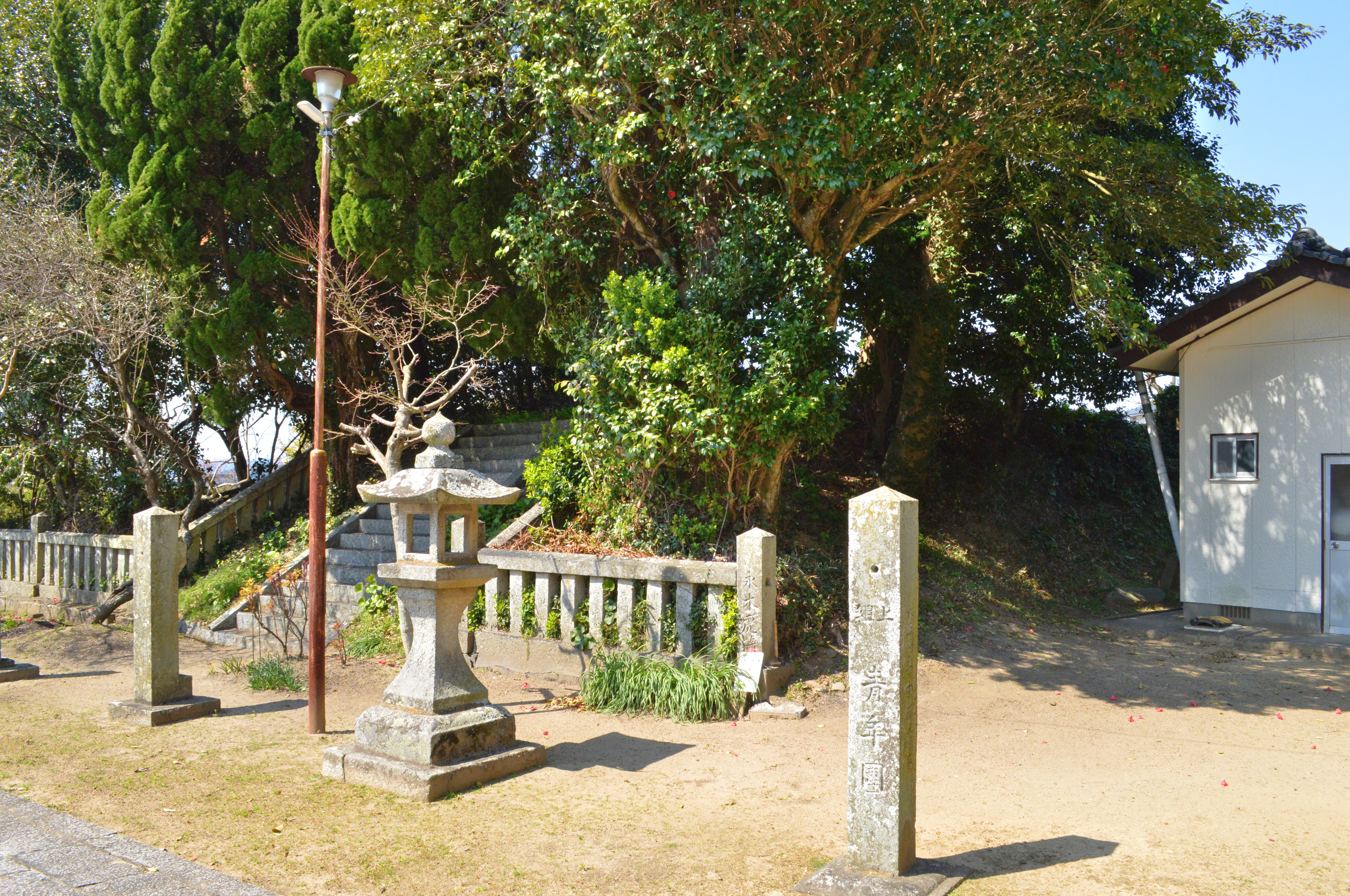
Baizuka tumulus at Shiratori Kofun

The tumulus is approximately 11.2 kilometers southwest of Yanai Station on the JR West San'yō Main Line.

== See also ==
- List of Historic Sites of Japan (Yamaguchi)
