= Kōjiro Station (Yamaguchi) =

Railway station in Iwakuni, Yamaguchi Prefecture, Japan

Kōjiro Station 神代駅
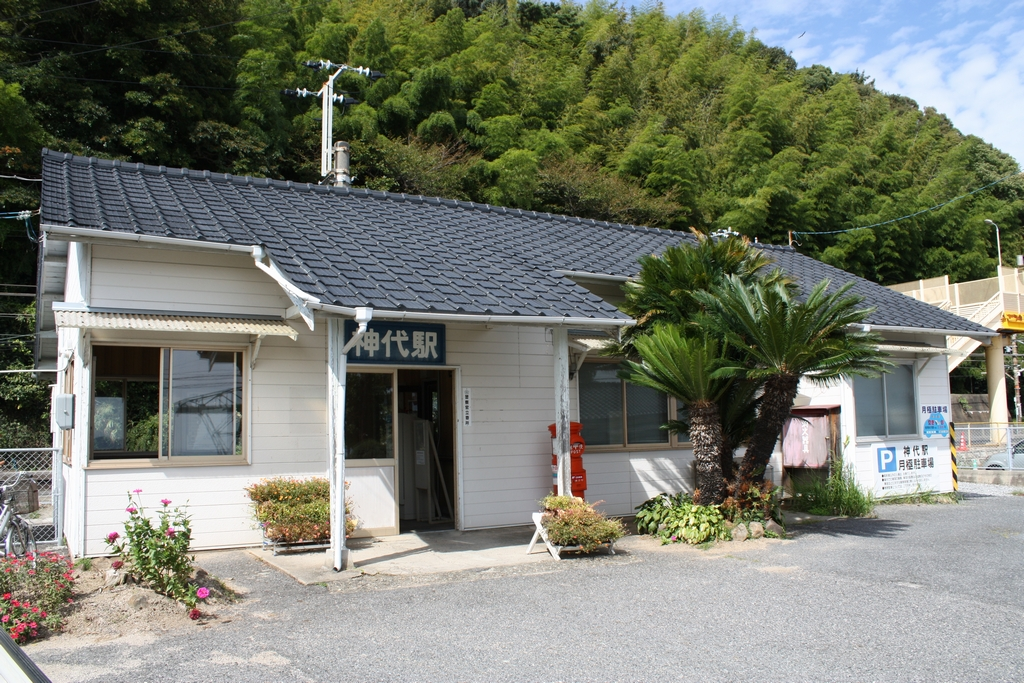
- Kōjiro Station in October 2008

General information
- Location: Yūmachi Shintō, Iwakuni-shi, Yamaguchi-ken 740-1432; Japan
- Coordinates: 33°59′55″N 132°12′31.27″E
- Owner: West Japan Railway Company
- Operator: West Japan Railway Company
- Line: San'yō Line
- Distance: 366.8 km (227.9 miles) from Kobe
- Platforms: 2 side platforms
- Tracks: 2
- Connections: Bus stop

Construction
- Accessible: Yes

Other information
- Status: Unstaffed
- Website: Official website

History
- Opened: 11 October 1944; 82 years ago

Passengers
- FY2022: 45

Services
Preceding station	JR West	Following station
Ōbatake towards Shimonoseki	San'yō Line Local	Yū towards Iwakuni
Location
- Location within Yamaguchi Prefecture Location within Japan

Kōjiro Station (神代駅, Kōjiro-eki) is a passenger railway station located in the city of Iwakuni, Yamaguchi Prefecture, Japan. It is operated by the West Japan Railway Company (JR West).

== Lines ==
Kōjiro Station is served by the JR West Sanyō Main Line, and is located 366.8 kilometers from the terminus of the line at Kobe.

== Station layout ==
The station consists of two unnumbered opposed side platforms connected by a footbridge. The station is unattended.

== Platforms ==
station side	■ San'yō Line	for Yanai and Tokuyama
opposite side	■ San'yō Line	for Iwakuni and Hiroshima

== History ==
Kōjiro Station was opened on 13 July 1917 as signal stop and was elevated to a full passenger station on 11 October 1944. With the privatization of the Japan National Railway (JNR) on 1 April 1987, the station came under the aegis of the West Japan railway Company (JR West).

== Passenger statistics ==
In fiscal 2022, the station was used by an average of 45 passengers daily.

== Surrounding area ==
- Japan National Route 188
- Iwakuni City Jinto Elementary School

== See also ==
- List of railway stations in Japan
