= Kaminoseki =

Kaminoseki 上関町
- Town
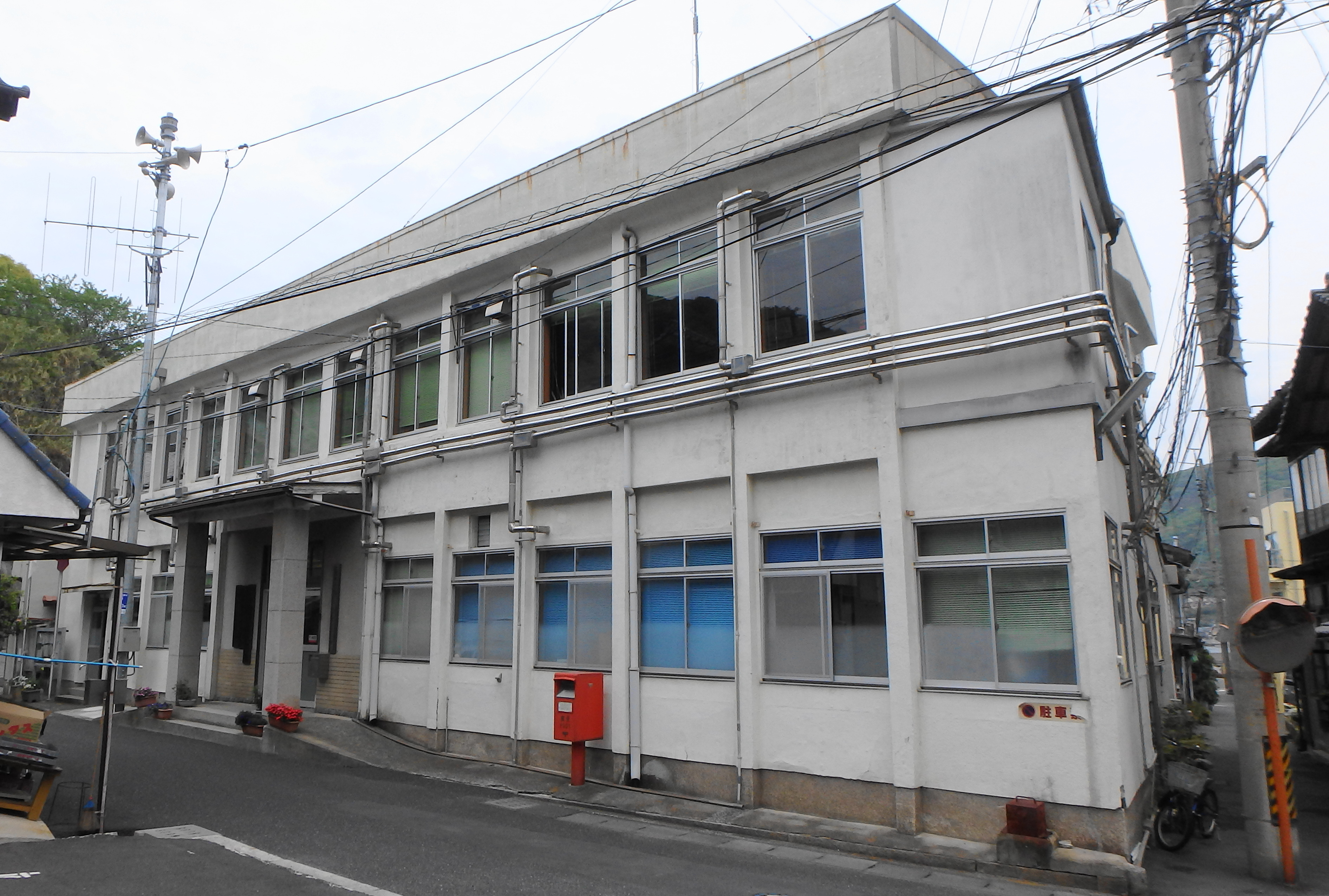
- Kaminoseki town hall

- Flag Emblem
- Interactive map of Kaminoseki
- Location in Japan
- Coordinates: 33°49′51″N 132°7′38″E
- Country: Japan
- Region: Chūgoku; San'yō
- Prefecture: Yamaguchi
- District: Kumage

Area
  - Total: 34.69 km^{2} (13.39 sq mi)

Population (May 31, 2023)
  - Total: 2,340
  - Density: 67.5/km^{2} (175/sq mi)
- Time zone: UTC+09:00 (JST)
- City hall address: 503 Nagashima, Kaminoseki, Yamaguchi-ken 742-1402
- Website: Official website
- Symbols
- Fish: Red seabream
- Flower: Chrysanthemum
- Tree: Chamaecyparis obtusa

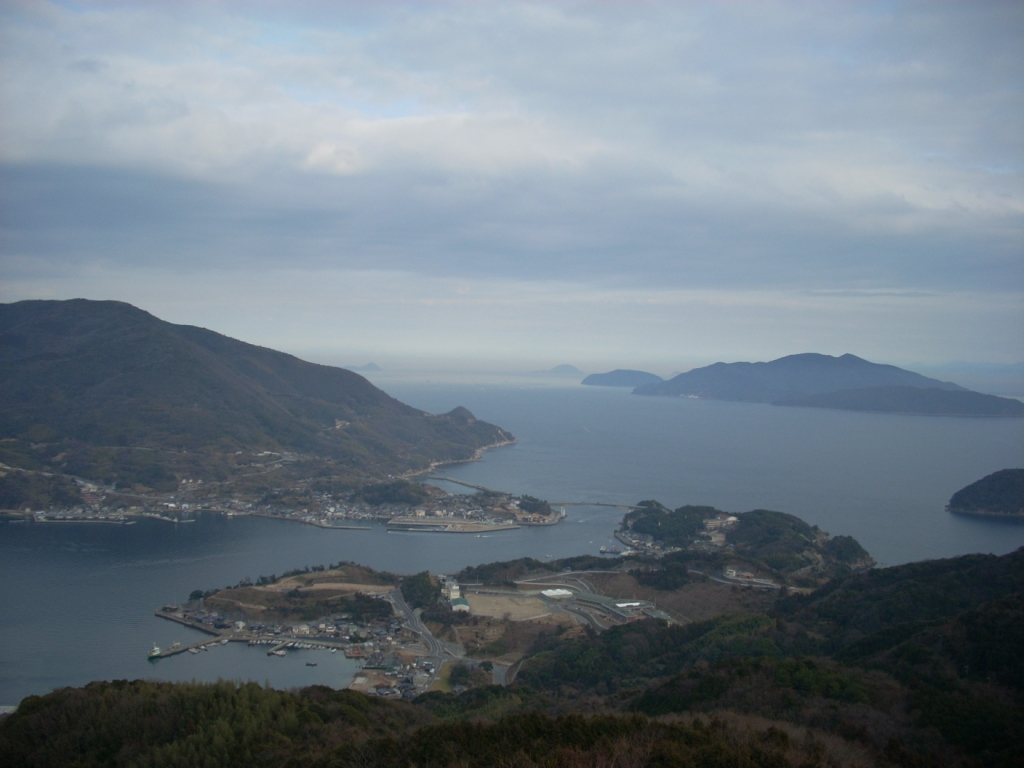
View from the Kamisakari

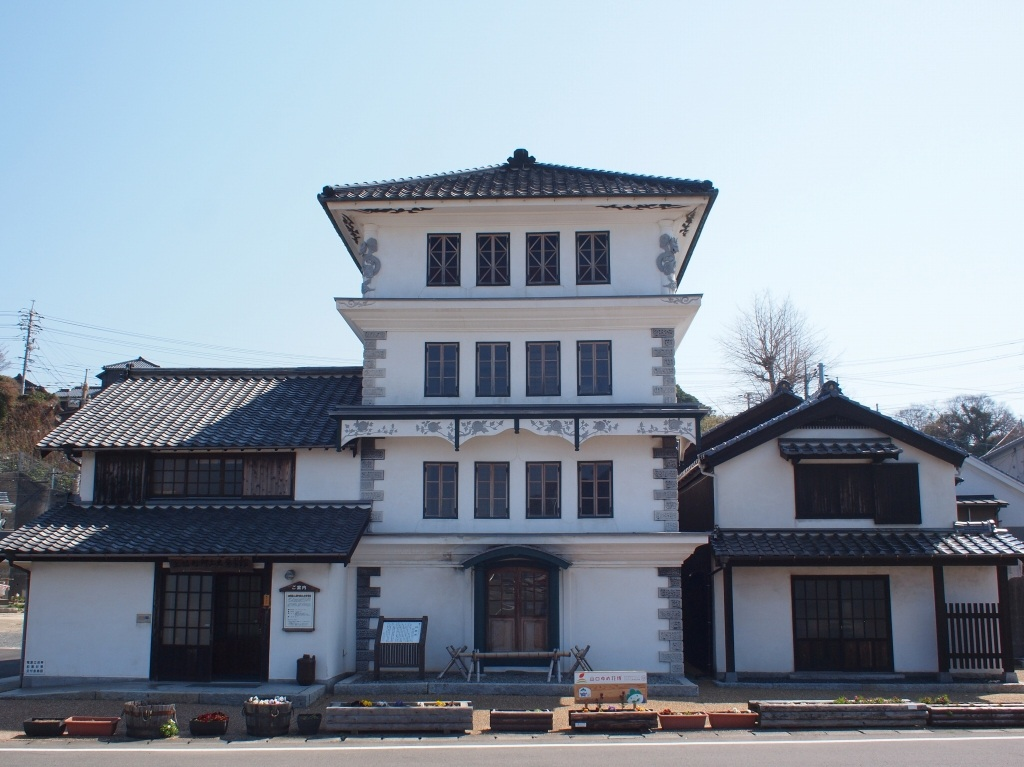
Shikairo

Kaminoseki (上関町, Kaminoseki-chō) is a town located in Kumage District, Yamaguchi Prefecture, Japan.As of 31 May 2023, the town had an estimated population of 2340 in 6947 households and a population density of 67 inhabitants per square kilometre (173.53/sq mi). The total area of the town is 34.69 km^{2} (13.39 sq mi).

== Geography ==
Kaminoseki is located in southeastern Yamaguchi Prefecture. The town area consists of the tip of the Murotsu Peninsula and islands such as Nagashima, Iwaishima, and Yashima, and the center of the town is the Murotsu district at the tip of the peninsula and the opposite shore of the Murotsu district, which is connected to the mainland by the Kaminoseki Ohashi Bridge. It is almost completely surrounded by the Seto Inland Sea.

=== Islands ===
- Iwaishima
- Nagashima
- Yashima

=== Neighbouring municipalities ===
Yamaguchi Prefecture

- Hirao
- Yanai

=== Climate ===
Kaminoseki has a humid subtropical climate (Köppen climate classification Cfa) with very warm summers and cool winters. The average annual temperature in Kaminoseki is 16.0 °C. The average annual rainfall is 1719 mm with September as the wettest month. The temperatures are highest on average in July, at around 26.2 °C, and lowest in January, at around 6.6 °C.

== Demographics ==
Per Japanese census data, the population of Kaminoseki, the population has decreased to one-third in the last 40 years, and the population is rapidly aging.

Historical population
Year	Pop.	±%
1940	10,542	—
1950	13,220	+25.4%
1960	11,196	−15.3%
1970	8,308	−25.8%
1980	6,773	−18.5%
1990	5,516	−18.6%
2000	4,307	−21.9%
2010	3,332	−22.6%
Waki population statistics

== History ==
The area of Kaminoseki was part of an ancient Suō Province. From the Heian period, it was the location of a maritime checkpoint to control trade and traffic in the Seto Inland Sea and until the end of the Muromachi period was called "Kamadoseki". Also during the Muromachi period, it was a noted base for Wokou pirates who raided the coasts of China and Korea. During the Edo Period, the area was part of the holdings of Chōshū Domain and prospered as a port for the kitamaebune coastal trade. Following the Meiji restoration, the village of Kaminoseki within Kumage District, Yamaguchi was established with the creation of the modern municipalities system on April 1, 1889. Kaminoseki annexed the neighboring village of Murotsu and was elevated to town status on February 1, 1958.

== Government ==
Kaminoseki has a mayor-council form of government with a directly elected mayor and a unicameral town council of ten members. Kaminoseki, together with the towns of Tabuse and Hirao contributes one member to the Yamaguchi Prefectural Assembly. In terms of national politics, the town is part of the Yamaguchi 2nd district of the lower house of the Diet of Japan.

== Economy ==
Tabuse has a rural economy based on agriculture and commercial fishing.

== Education ==
Kaminoseki has two public elementary school and one public junior high school operated by the town government. The town does not have a high school.

== Transportation ==
=== Railway ===
Kaminoseki does not have any passenger rail service. The nearest train station is Yanai Station on the JR West San'yō Main Line, which is located about 20 kilometers from the town.

=== Highways ===
The town is not on any national highway or expressway. Japan National Route 188 is 15 kilometers from the center of town.

- National Route 188
