= Ōbatake Station =

Railway station in Yanai, Yamaguchi Prefecture, Japan

Ōbatake Station 大畠駅
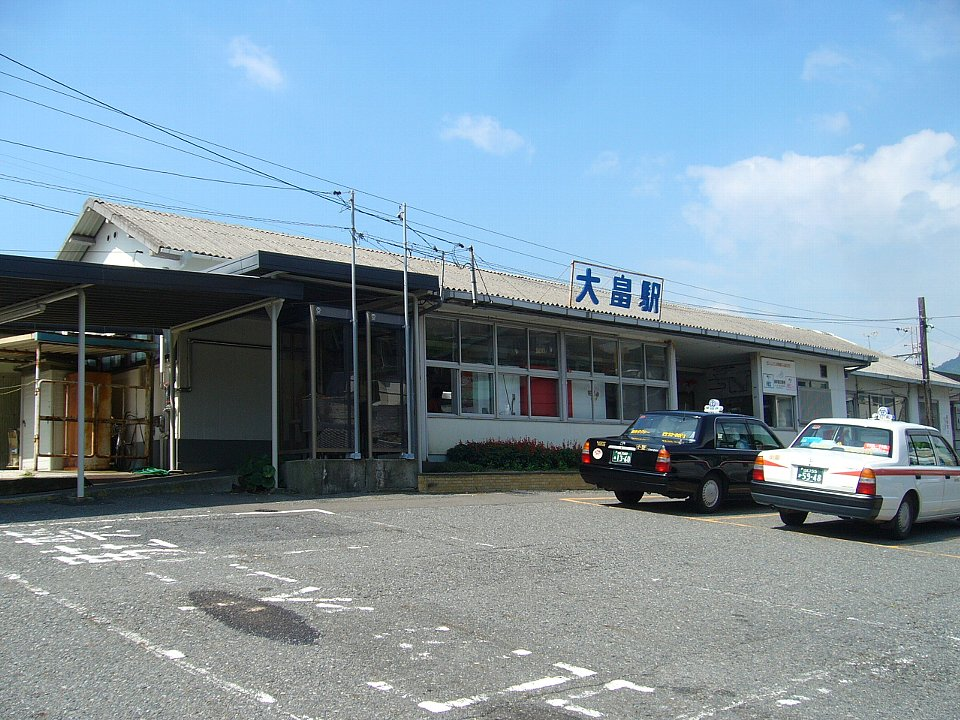
- Ōbatake Station in August 2008

General information
- Location: Kojirō-Higashiseto, Yanai-shi, Yamaguchi-ken 749-0101; Japan
- Coordinates: 33°57′45.8″N 132°10′57.3″E
- Owner: West Japan Railway Company
- Operator: West Japan Railway Company
- Line: San'yō Line
- Distance: 371.9 km (231.1 miles) from Kobe
- Platforms: 2 side platforms
- Tracks: 2
- Connections: Bus stop

Construction
- Accessible: Yes

Other information
- Status: Unstaffed
- Website: Official website

History
- Opened: 25 September 1897; 128 years ago

Passengers
- FY2022: 686

Services
Preceding station	JR West	Following station
Yanaiminato towards Shimonoseki	San'yō Line Local	Kōjiro towards Iwakuni
Location
- Location within Yamaguchi Prefecture Location within Japan

Ōbatake Station (大畠駅, Ōbatake-eki) is a passenger railway station located in the city of Yanai, Yamaguchi Prefecture, Japan. It is operated by the West Japan Railway Company (JR West).

== Lines ==
Ōbatake Station is served by the JR West Sanyō Main Line, and is located 371.9 kilometers from the terminus of the line at Kobe.

== Station layout ==
The station consists of two opposed side platforms connected by a footbridge. The station is unattended.

== Platforms ==
1	■ San'yō Line	for Iwakuni and Hiroshima
2	■ San'yō Line	for Yanai and Tokuyama

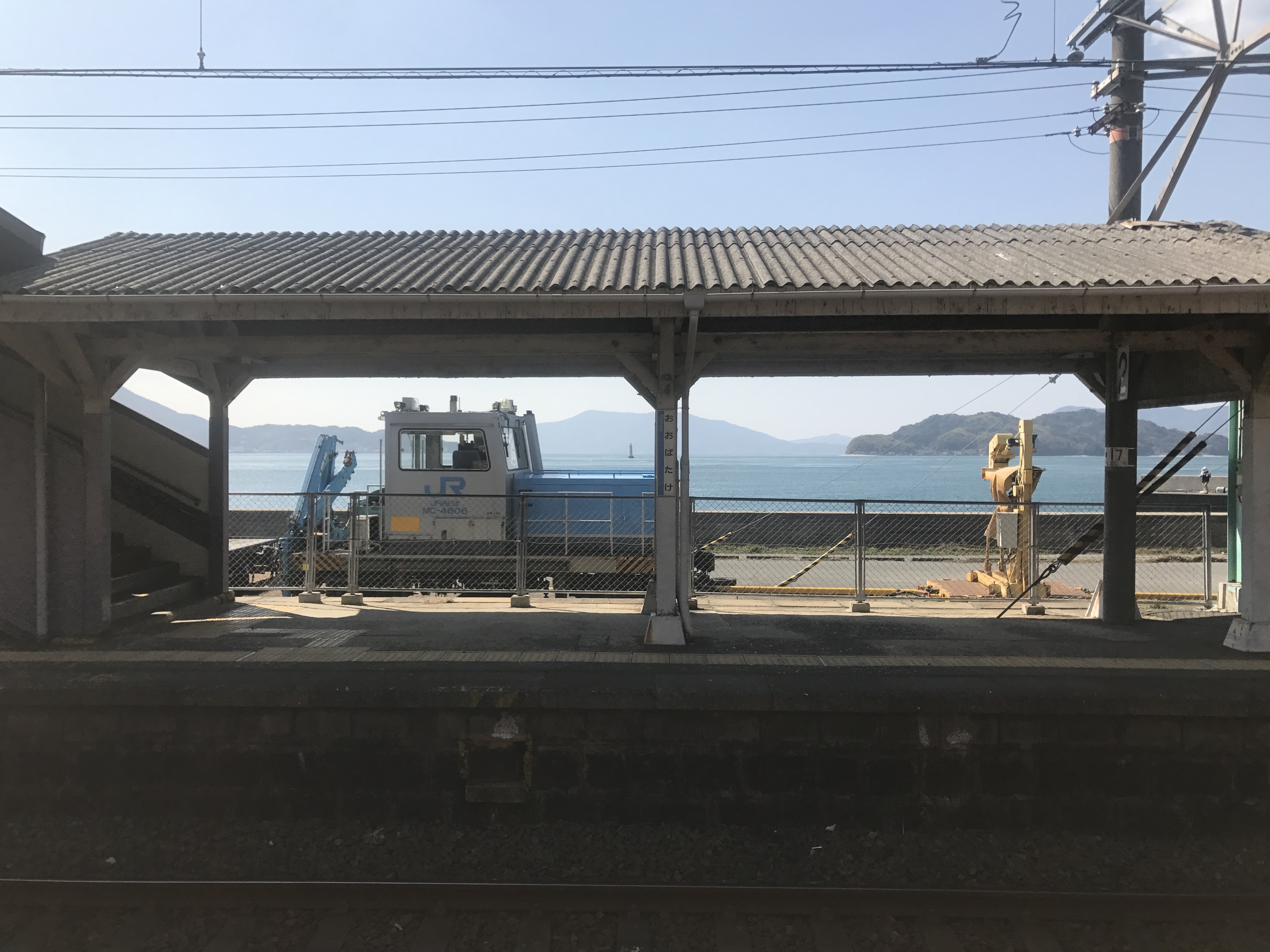
Ōbatake Station platform in March 2017

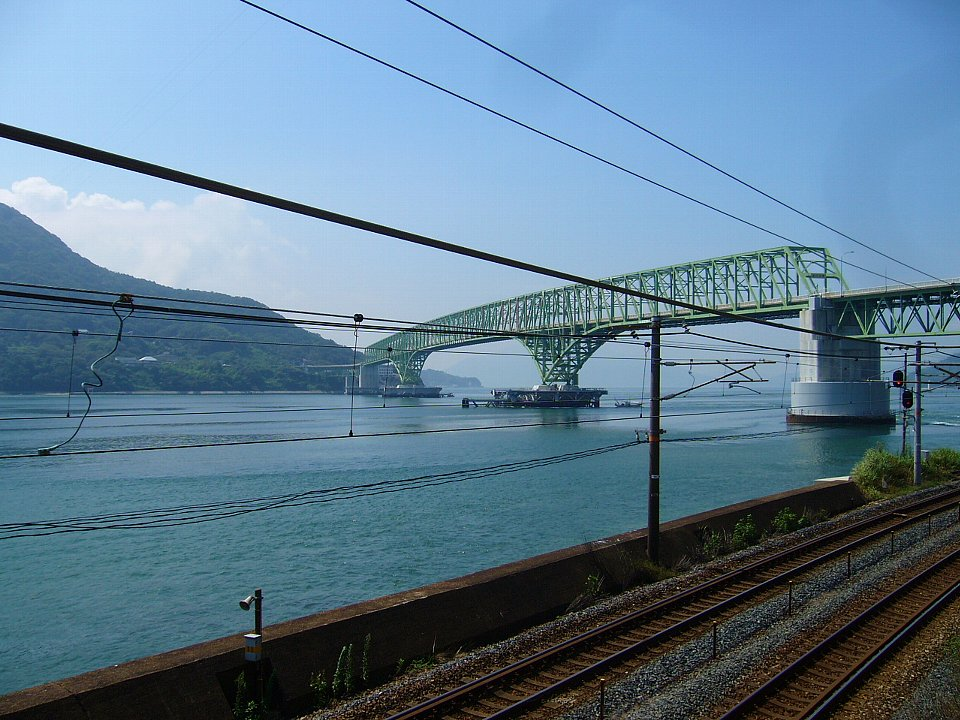
Obatake Seto and Oshima Ohashi Bridge, August 2006

== History ==
Ōbatake Station was opened on 25 September 1897 as a station on the San'yo Railway with the opening of the extension from Hiroshima to Tokuyama. The San'yo Railway was nationalized in 1906 and the line renamed the San'yo Main Line in 1909.. With the privatization of the Japan National Railway (JNR) on 1 April 1987, the station came under the aegis of the West Japan railway Company (JR West).

== Passenger statistics ==
In fiscal 2022, the station was used by an average of 686 passengers daily.

== Surrounding area ==
- Yanai City Hall Ōbatake General Branch (former Ōbatake Town Hall)
- Oshima Bridge
- Yanai Municipal Ōbatake Junior High School

== See also ==
- List of railway stations in Japan
