= Yū Station =

Railway station in Iwakuni, Yamaguchi Prefecture, Japan

Yū Station 由宇駅
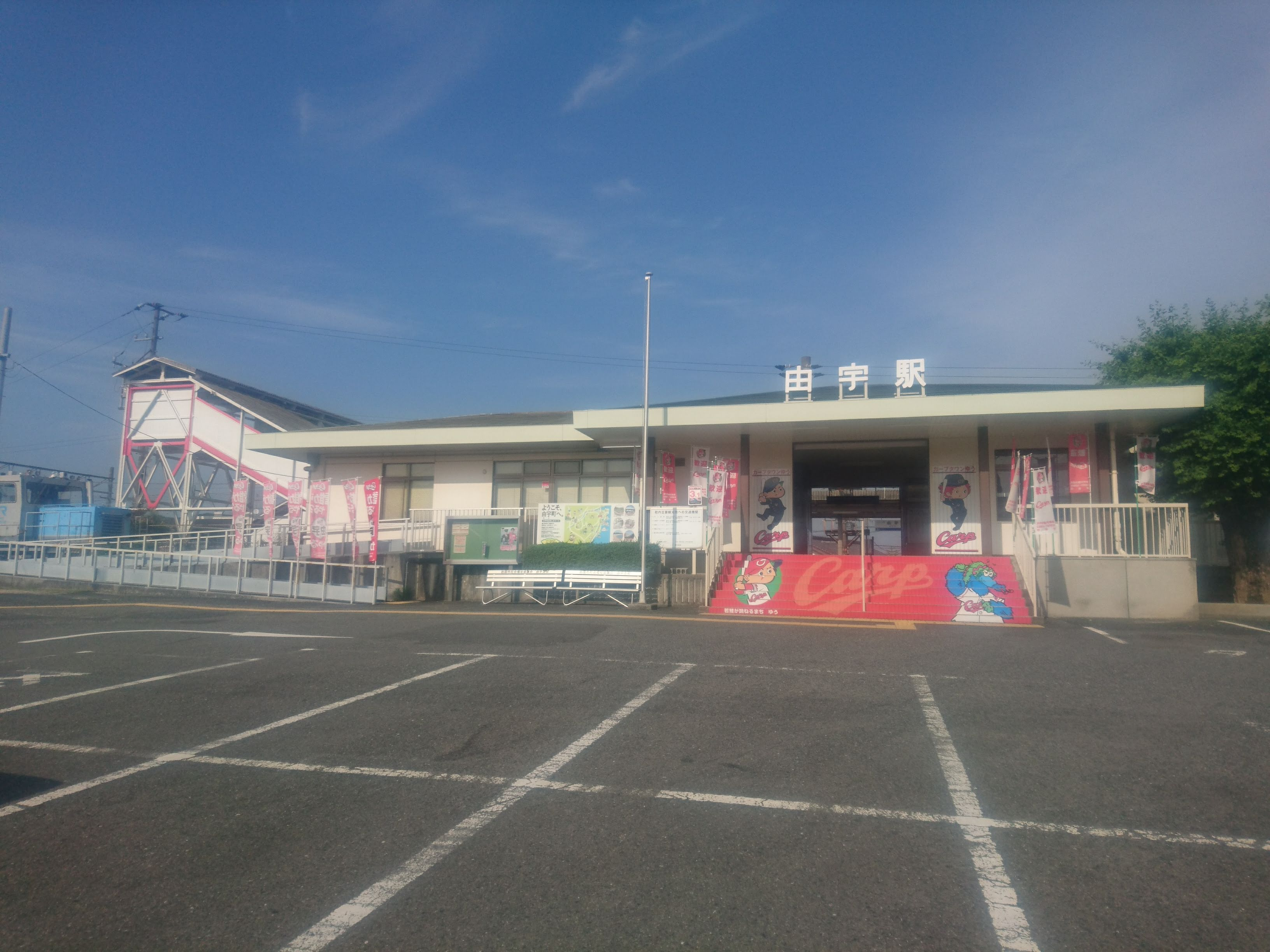
- Yū Station in June 2018

General information
- Location: 1-1 Yūmachimachiminami, Iwakuni-shi, Yamaguchi-ken 740-1451; Japan
- Coordinates: 34°2′35.35″N 132°12′48.55″E
- Owner: West Japan Railway Company
- Operator: West Japan Railway Company
- Line: San'yō Line
- Distance: 361.6 km (224.7 miles) from Kobe
- Platforms: 1 side + 1 island platform
- Tracks: 3
- Connections: Bus stop

Construction
- Accessible: Yes

Other information
- Status: Unstaffed
- Website: Official website

History
- Opened: 25 September 1897; 129 years ago

Passengers
- FY2022: 657

Services
Preceding station	JR West	Following station
Tsuzu towards Shimonoseki	San'yō Line Local	Kōjiro towards Iwakuni
Location
- Location within Yamaguchi Prefecture Location within Japan

Yū Station (由宇駅, Yū-eki) is a passenger railway station located in the city of Iwakuni, Yamaguchi Prefecture, Japan. It is operated by the West Japan Railway Company (JR West).

== Lines ==
Yū Station is served by the JR West Sanyō Main Line, and is located 361.6 kilometers from the terminus of the line at Kobe.

== Station layout ==
The station consists of one side platform and one island platform connected by a footbridge. The station is unattended.

== Platforms ==
1	■ San'yō Line	for Iwakuni and Hiroshima
2, 3	■ San'yō Line	for Yanai and Tokuyama

== History ==
Yū Station was opened on 25 September 1897 as a station on the San'yo Railway when the line was extended from Hiroshima to Tokuyama. The line was nationized in 1906 and renamed the San'yo Main Line in 1909. With the privatization of the Japan National Railway (JNR) on 1 April 1987, the station came under the aegis of the West Japan railway Company (JR West).

== Passenger statistics ==
In fiscal 2022, the station was used by an average of 657 passengers daily.

== Surrounding area ==
- former Yu Town Office
- Iwakuni City Yu Junior High School
- Iwakuni Yu Elementary School

== See also ==
- List of railway stations in Japan
