= Tokuyama, Yamaguchi =

Former city in Japan

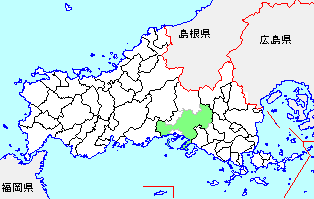
Tokuyama in Yamaguchi Prefecture

Tokuyama (徳山市, Tokuyama-shi) was a city located in Yamaguchi Prefecture, Japan.

On April 21, 2003, Tokuyama, along with the city of Shinnan'yō, the town of Kumage (from Kumage District), and the town of Kano (from Tsuno District), was merged to create the city of Shūnan.

The city had a population of about 150,000 people. Its location along the Sanyō Shinkansen made for easy access to nearby cities such as Hiroshima and Fukuoka. Hikari holds a sizable beach.

== Education ==
The city previously had a North Korean school, Tokuyama Korean Elementary and Junior High School (徳山朝鮮初中級学校).
