= Kumage District =

Kumage District may refer to:

- Kumage District, Kagoshima, Japan
- Kumage District, Yamaguchi, Japan
