= Fuju =

Fuju (Chinese: 复榘) or Fūju (Japanese: 楓珠) is an Asian given name. Notable people with the given name include:

- Han Fuju (韩复榘; 1890–1938), Chinese general
- Fūju Kamio (神尾 楓珠; born 1999), Japanese actor

== See also ==
- Fujū Station, a train station in Iwakuni, Japan
