= Minami-Iwakuni Station =

Railway station in Iwakuni, Yamaguchi Prefecture, Japan

Minami-Iwakuni Station 南岩国駅
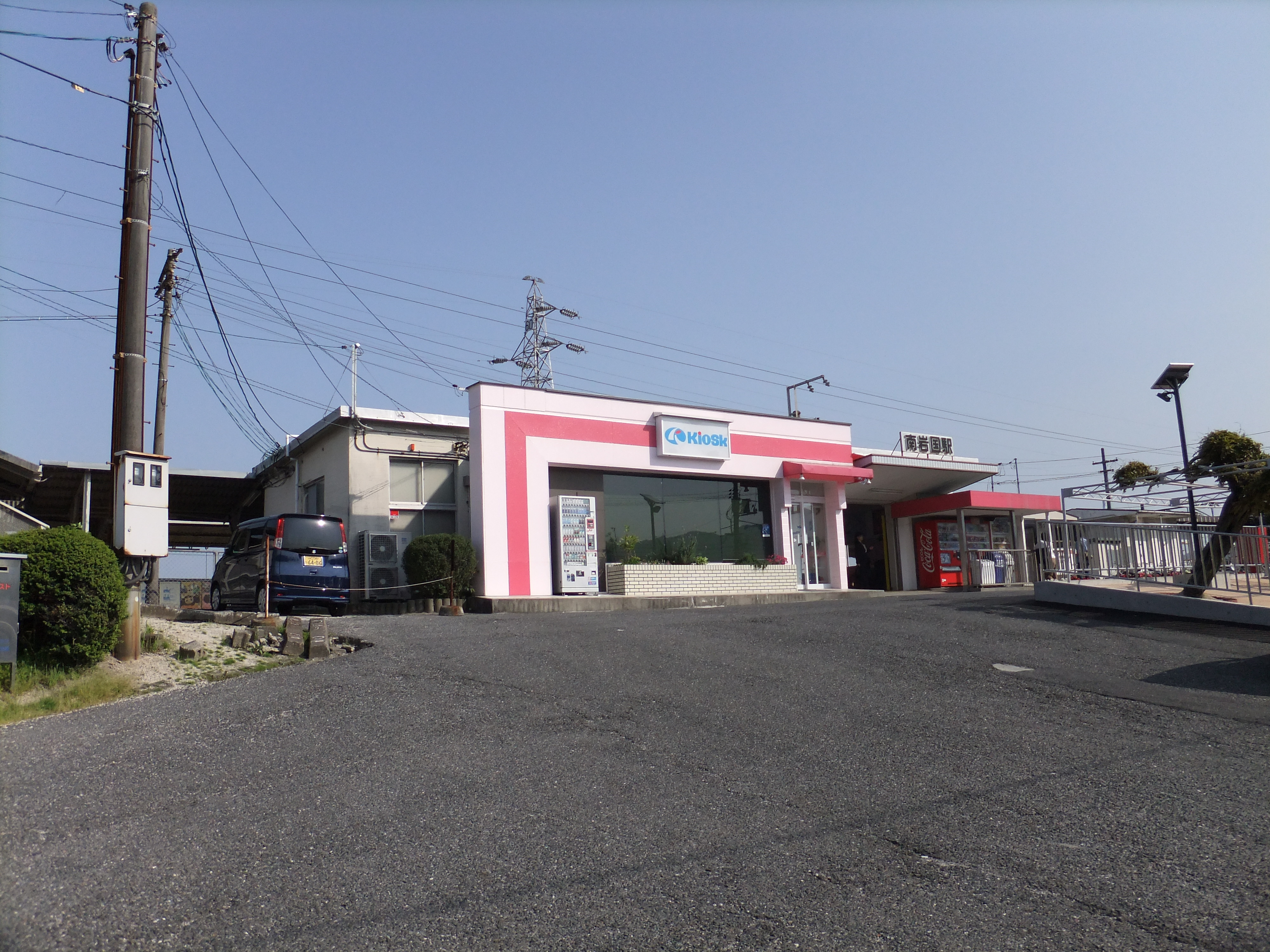
- Minami-Iwakuni Station in May 2012

General information
- Location: 1-chōme-1 Minamiiwakunimachi, Iwakuni-shi, Yamaguchi-ken 740-0034; Japan
- Coordinates: 34°8′7.27″N 132°12′21.58″E
- Owner: West Japan Railway Company
- Operator: West Japan Railway Company
- Line: San'yō Line
- Distance: 350.7 km (217.9 miles) from Kobe
- Platforms: 1 side + 1 island platform
- Tracks: 3
- Connections: Bus stop

Construction
- Accessible: Yes

Other information
- Status: Staffed (Midori no Madoguchi)
- Website: Official website

History
- Opened: 20 June 1952; 74 years ago

Passengers
- FY2022: 1433

Services
Preceding station	JR West	Following station
Fujū towards Shimonoseki	San'yō Line Local	Iwakuni Terminus
Location
- Location within Yamaguchi Prefecture Location within Japan

Minami-Iwakuni Station (南岩国駅, Minami-Iwakuni-eki) is a passenger railway station located in the city of Iwakuni, Yamaguchi Prefecture, Japan. It is operated by the West Japan Railway Company (JR West).

== Lines ==
Minami-Iwakuni Station is served by the JR West Sanyō Main Line, and is located 350.7 kilometers from the terminus of the line at Kobe.

== Station layout ==
The station consists of one side platform and one island platform connected by a footbridge. The station has a Midori no Madoguchi staffed ticket office.

== Platforms ==
1	■ San'yō Line	for Iwakuni and Hiroshima
2, 3	■ San'yō Line	for Yanai and Tokuyama

== History ==
Minami-Iwakuni Station was opened on 20 June 1952. With the privatization of the Japan National Railway (JNR) on 1 April 1987, the station came under the aegis of the West Japan railway Company (JR West).

== Passenger statistics ==
In fiscal 2022, the station was used by an average of 1433 passengers daily.

== Surrounding area ==
- Japan National Route 188
- Takamizu High School/Affiliated Junior High School

== See also ==
- List of railway stations in Japan
