= Tsuzu Station =

Railway station in Iwakuni, Yamaguchi Prefecture, Japan

Tsuzu Station 通津駅
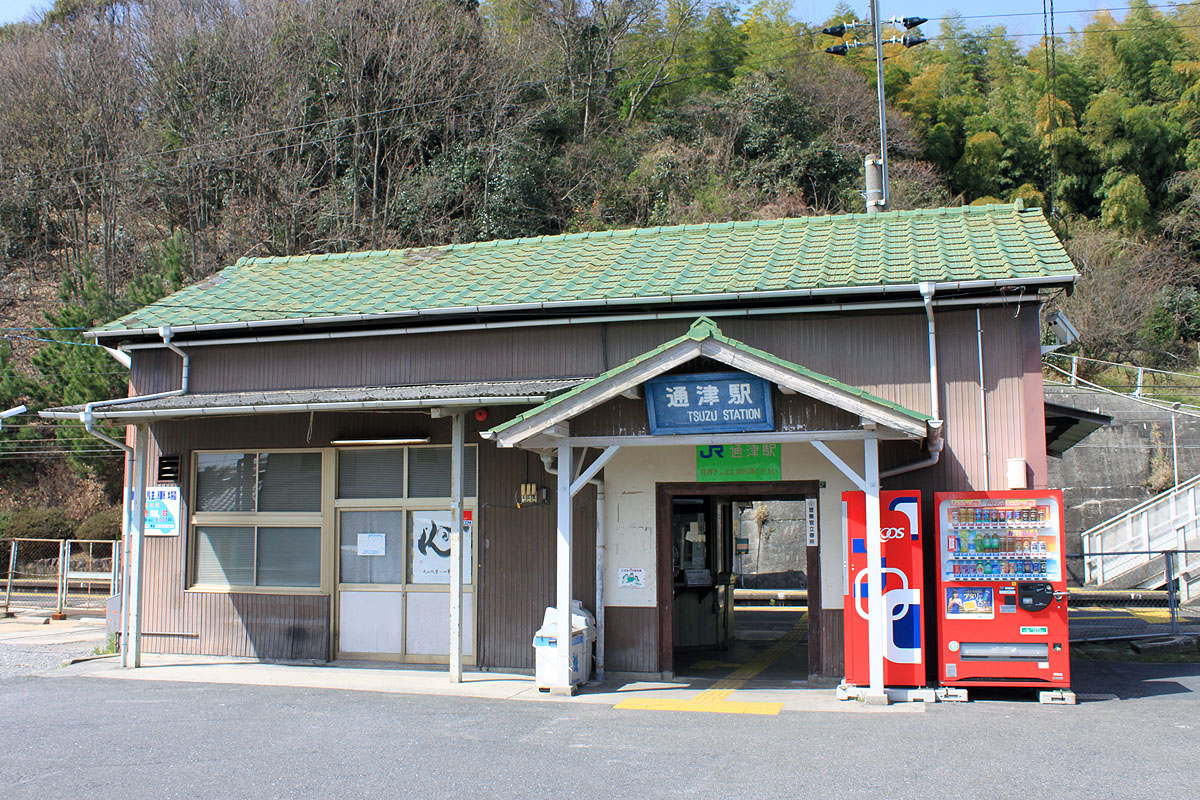
- Tsuzu Station in March 2010

General information
- Location: 3382 Tsuzu, Iwakuni-shi, Yamaguchi-ken 740-0044; Japan
- Coordinates: 34°4′6.01″N 132°12′18.44″E
- Owner: West Japan Railway Company
- Operator: West Japan Railway Company
- Line: San'yō Line
- Distance: 358.6 km (222.8 miles) from Kobe
- Platforms: 2 side platforms
- Tracks: 2
- Connections: Bus stop

Construction
- Accessible: Yes

Other information
- Status: Unstaffed
- Website: Official website

History
- Opened: 11 August 1934; 92 years ago

Passengers
- FY2022: 409

Services
| Preceding station | JR West | Following station |
|---|---|---|
| Yū towards Shimonoseki | San'yō Line Local | Fujū towards Iwakuni |
Location
- Location within Yamaguchi Prefecture Location within Japan

Tsuzu Station (通津駅, Tsuzu-eki) is a passenger railway station located in the city of Iwakuni, Yamaguchi Prefecture, Japan. It is operated by the West Japan Railway Company (JR West).

== Lines ==
Tsuzu Station is served by the JR West Sanyō Main Line, and is located 358.6 kilometers from the terminus of the line at Kobe.

== Station layout ==
The station consists of two unnumbered opposed side platforms connected by a footbridge. The station is unattended.

== Platforms ==
| station side | ■ San'yō Line | for Yanai and Tokuyama |
| opposite side | ■ San'yō Line | for Iwakuni and Hiroshima |

== History ==
Tsuzu Station was opened on 11 August 1934. With the privatization of the Japan National Railway (JNR) on 1 April 1987, the station came under the aegis of the West Japan railway Company (JR West).

== Passenger statistics ==
In fiscal 2022, the station was used by an average of 409 passengers daily.

== Surrounding area ==
- Iwakuni Municipal Tsuzu Junior High School
- Iwakuni Municipal Tsuzu Elementary School

== See also ==
- List of railway stations in Japan
