= Fujū Station =

Railway station in Iwakuni, Yamaguchi Prefecture, Japan

Fujū Station 藤生駅
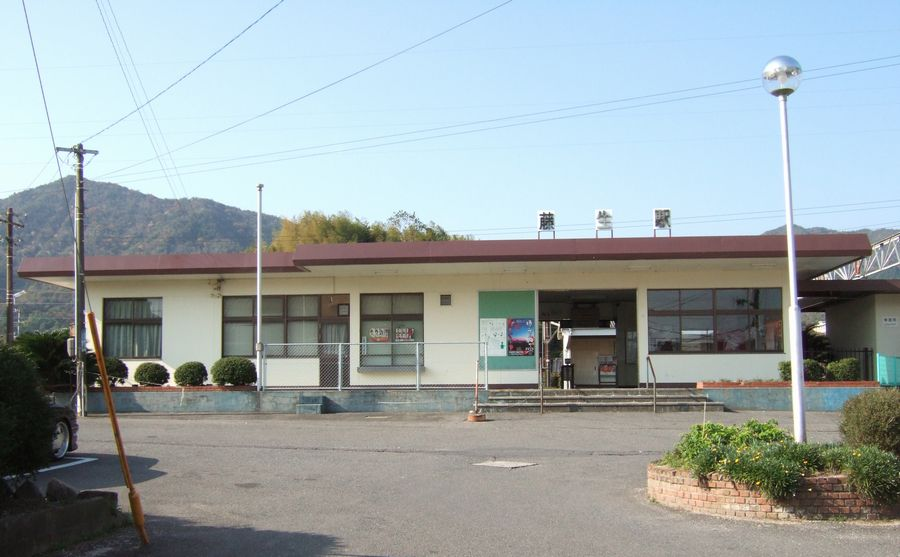
- Fujū Station in November 2006

General information
- Location: 1-chōme-21 Fujūmachi, Iwakuni-shi, Yamaguchi-ken 740-0036; Japan
- Coordinates: 34°6′45.4″N 132°11′55.32″E
- Owner: West Japan Railway Company
- Operator: West Japan Railway Company
- Line: San'yō Line
- Distance: 353.4 km (219.6 miles) from Kobe
- Platforms: 2 side platforms
- Tracks: 2
- Connections: Bus stop

Construction
- Accessible: Yes

Other information
- Status: Unstaffed
- Website: Official website

History
- Opened: 25 September 1897; 129 years ago

Passengers
- FY2022: 456

Services
Preceding station	JR West	Following station
Tsuzu towards Shimonoseki	San'yō Line Local	Minami-Iwakuni towards Iwakuni
Location
- Location within Yamaguchi Prefecture Location within Japan

Fujū Station (藤生駅, Fujū-eki) is a passenger railway station located in the city of Iwakuni, Yamaguchi Prefecture, Japan. It is operated by the West Japan Railway Company (JR West).

== Lines ==
Fujū Station is served by the JR West Sanyō Main Line, and is located 353.4 kilometers from the terminus of the line at Kobe.

== Station layout ==
The station consists of two unnumbered opposed side platforms connected by a footbridge. The station is unattended.

== Platforms ==
station side	■ San'yō Line	for Yanai and Tokuyama
opposite side	■ San'yō Line	for Iwakuni and Hiroshima

== History ==
Fujū Station was opened on 25 September 1897 as a station on the San'yo Railway with the extension of the line from Hiroshima to Tokuyama. The San'yo Railway was nationalized in 1906 and the line renamed the San'yo Main Line in 1909. With the privatization of the Japan National Railway (JNR) on 1 April 1987, the station came under the aegis of the West Japan railway Company (JR West).

== Passenger statistics ==
In fiscal 2022, the station was used by an average of 456 passengers daily.

== Surrounding area ==
- Japan National Route 188
- Yamaguchi Prefectural Iwakuni General High School
- Iwakuni City Nada Junior High School
- Iwakuni City Nada Elementary School

== See also ==
- List of railway stations in Japan
