= Yanai, Yamaguchi =

Yanai 柳井市
- City
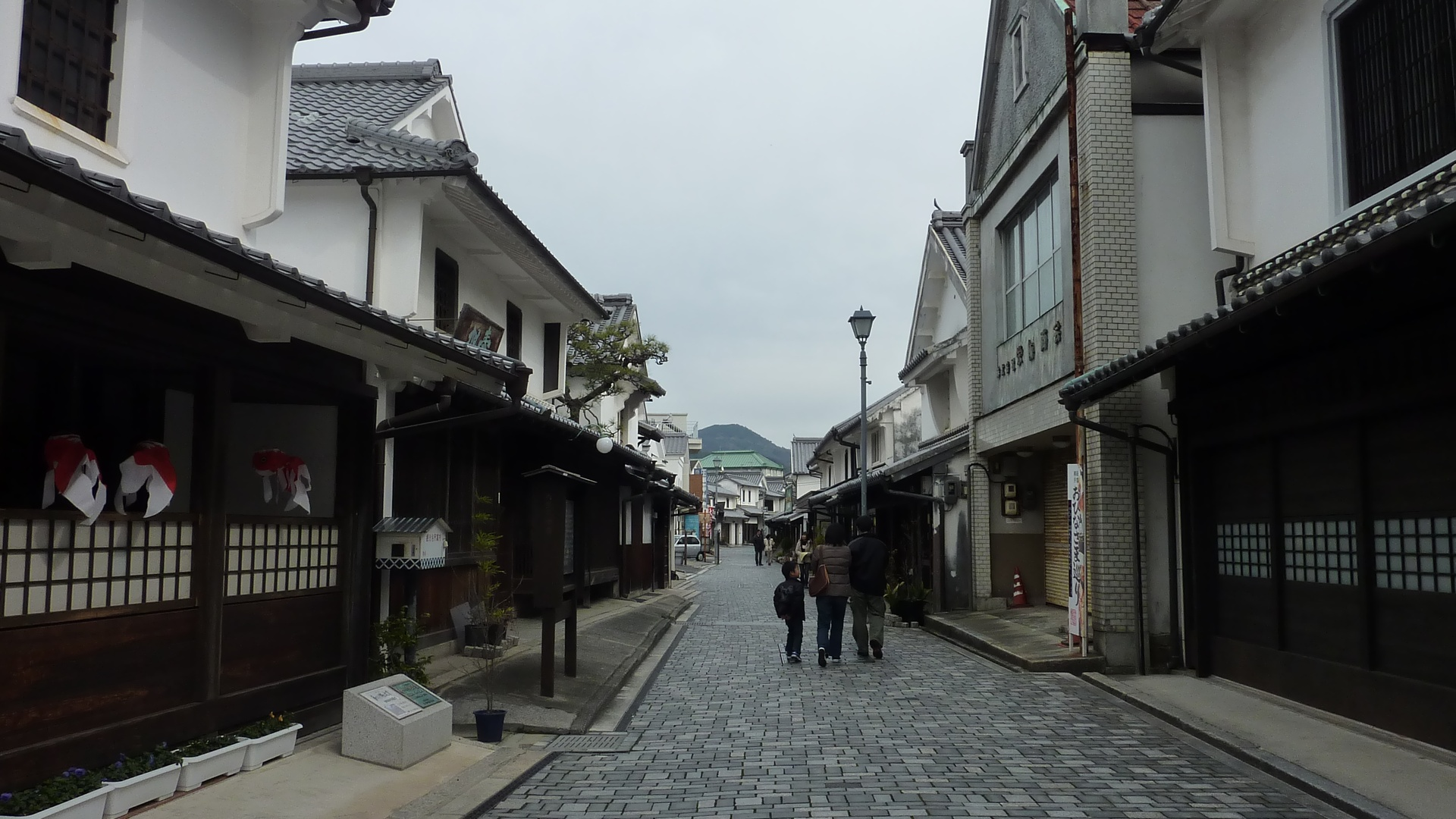
- Important Preservation Districts for Groups of Historic Buildings in Yanai

- Flag Emblem
- Location of Yanai in Yamaguchi Prefecture

- Location in Japan
- Coordinates: 33°57′50″N 132°07′07″E
- Country: Japan
- Region: Chūgoku (San'yō)
- Prefecture: Yamaguchi

Government
  - Mayor: Kentaro Ihara

Area
  - Total: 140.05 km^{2} (54.07 sq mi)

Population (May 31, 2023)
  - Total: 29,821
  - Density: 212.93/km^{2} (551.49/sq mi)
- Time zone: UTC+09:00 (JST)
- City hall address: 1-10-2, Minami-cho, Yanai-shi, Yamaguchi-ken 742-8714
- Climate: Cfa
- Website: Official website
- Symbols
- Flower: Azalea and scarlet sage
- Tree: Willow and Osmanthus

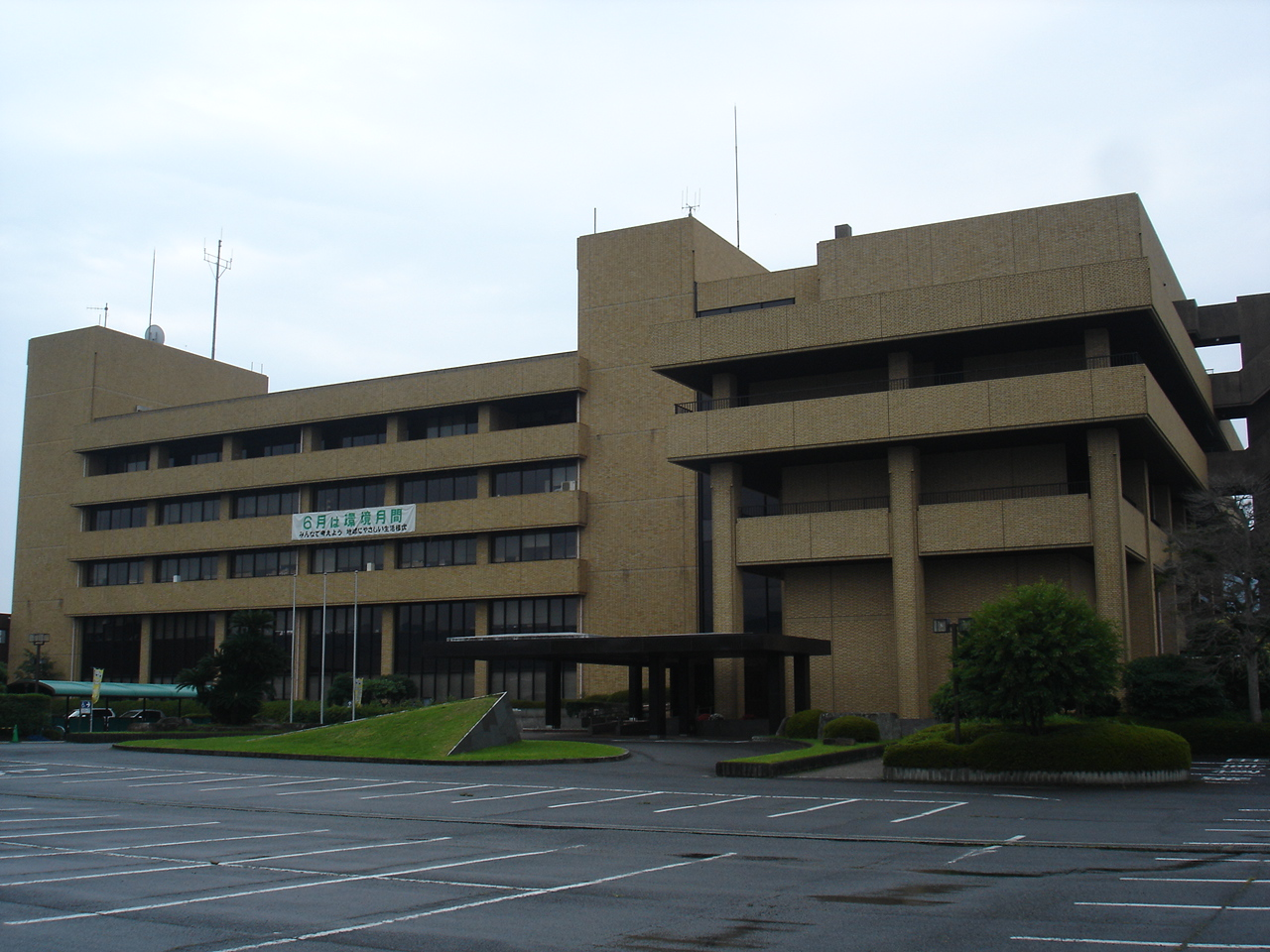
Yanai City Hall

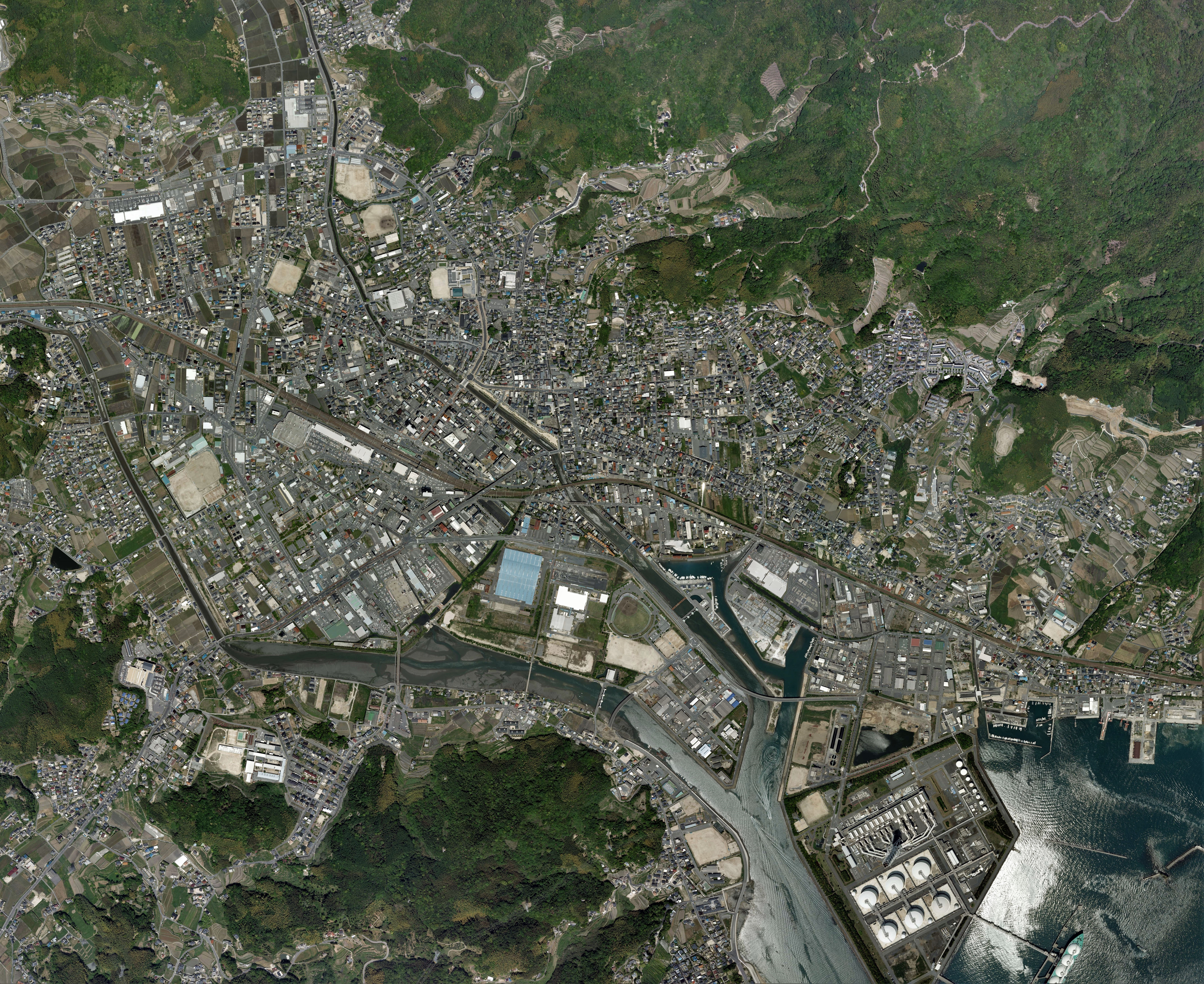
Yanai City center

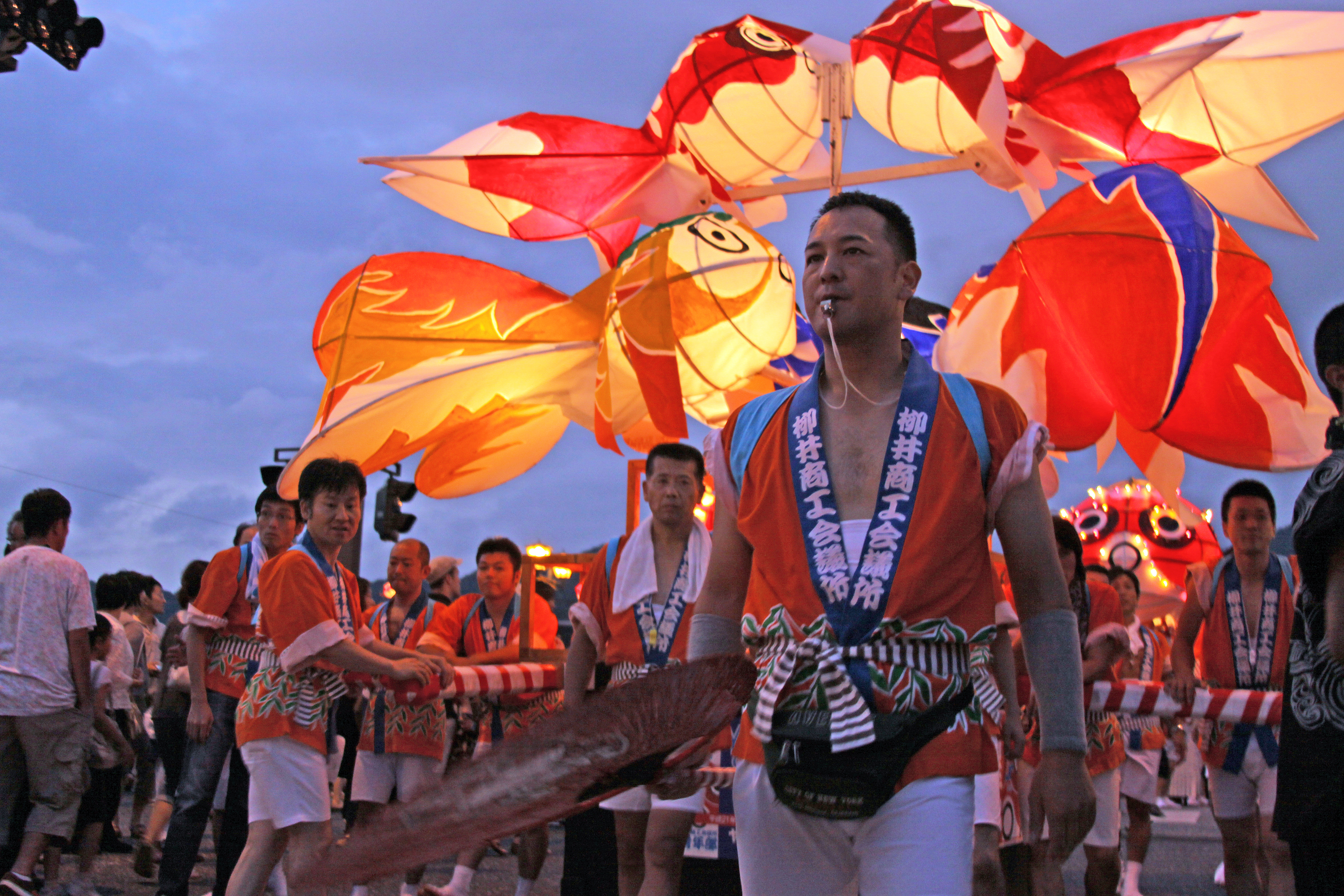
Yanai Goldfish Lantern Festival

Yanai (柳井市, Yanai-shi) is a city located in Yamaguchi Prefecture, Japan. As of 31 May 2023, the city had an estimated population of 29,821 in 15298 households and a population density of 210 persons per km². The total area of the city is 140.05 square kilometres (54.07 sq mi).

== Geography ==
Yanai is located in southeastern Yamaguchi Prefecture, at the base of the eastern coast of the Murotsu Peninsula. The city overlooks Mt. Kotoishi(Chūgoku 100 mountains) and portions are within the borders of the Setonaikai National Park. The city area consists of coastal areas, inland areas (Ikachi and Hizumi areas), peninsulas and islands (Heigun Island), and more than half of the total area is mountainous and hilly. Urban areas are mostly on flat areas along the coast. In the northern inland area, and rural villages are scattered along river basins.

=== Neighbouring municipalities ===
Yamaguchi Prefecture

- Hikari
- Hirao
- Iwakuni
- Kaminoseki
- Suō-Ōshima
- Tabuse

=== Climate ===
Yanai has a humid subtropical climate (Köppen climate classification Cfa) with hot summers and cool winters. Precipitation is significant throughout the year, but is much higher in summer than in winter. The average annual temperature in Yanai is 15.8 °C (60.4 °F). The average annual rainfall is 1,712.4 mm (67.42 in) with July as the wettest month. The temperatures are highest on average in August, at around 27.2 °C (81.0 °F), and lowest in January, at around 5.0 °C (41.0 °F). The highest temperature ever recorded in Yanai was 36.9 °C (98.4 °F) on 3 August 2026; the coldest temperature ever recorded was −7.9 °C (17.8 °F) on 27 February 1981.

Climate data for Yanai (1991−2020 normals, extremes 1977−present)
| Month | Jan | Feb | Mar | Apr | May | Jun | Jul | Aug | Sep | Oct | Nov | Dec | Year |
|---|---|---|---|---|---|---|---|---|---|---|---|---|---|
| Record high °C (°F) | 18.8 (65.8) | 20.5 (68.9) | 25.1 (77.2) | 27.7 (81.9) | 31.1 (88.0) | 32.4 (90.3) | 36.5 (97.7) | 36.9 (98.4) | 35.2 (95.4) | 30.8 (87.4) | 26.3 (79.3) | 22.3 (72.1) | 36.9 (98.4) |
| Mean daily maximum °C (°F) | 9.8 (49.6) | 10.5 (50.9) | 13.8 (56.8) | 18.9 (66.0) | 23.3 (73.9) | 25.9 (78.6) | 29.9 (85.8) | 31.5 (88.7) | 28.3 (82.9) | 23.2 (73.8) | 17.6 (63.7) | 12.2 (54.0) | 20.4 (68.7) |
| Daily mean °C (°F) | 5.0 (41.0) | 5.7 (42.3) | 9.0 (48.2) | 13.8 (56.8) | 18.3 (64.9) | 21.8 (71.2) | 25.8 (78.4) | 27.2 (81.0) | 24.0 (75.2) | 18.5 (65.3) | 12.7 (54.9) | 7.3 (45.1) | 15.8 (60.4) |
| Mean daily minimum °C (°F) | 0.7 (33.3) | 1.1 (34.0) | 4.1 (39.4) | 8.8 (47.8) | 13.8 (56.8) | 18.5 (65.3) | 22.8 (73.0) | 23.9 (75.0) | 20.4 (68.7) | 14.4 (57.9) | 8.3 (46.9) | 2.9 (37.2) | 11.6 (52.9) |
| Record low °C (°F) | −6.7 (19.9) | −7.9 (17.8) | −4.7 (23.5) | −1.1 (30.0) | 3.5 (38.3) | 9.8 (49.6) | 15.9 (60.6) | 17.2 (63.0) | 9.7 (49.5) | 2.2 (36.0) | −1.6 (29.1) | −5.0 (23.0) | −7.9 (17.8) |
| Average precipitation mm (inches) | 54.0 (2.13) | 78.5 (3.09) | 137.9 (5.43) | 164.9 (6.49) | 184.4 (7.26) | 276.0 (10.87) | 287.1 (11.30) | 126.9 (5.00) | 152.3 (6.00) | 108.7 (4.28) | 78.0 (3.07) | 63.7 (2.51) | 1,712.4 (67.42) |
| Average precipitation days (≥ 1.0 mm) | 6.5 | 7.7 | 9.9 | 9.7 | 9.4 | 12.1 | 10.2 | 7.5 | 8.6 | 6.8 | 7.3 | 6.8 | 102.5 |
| Mean monthly sunshine hours | 152.8 | 154.0 | 179.5 | 201.3 | 217.9 | 155.3 | 190.1 | 225.5 | 173.5 | 179.3 | 161.8 | 158.8 | 2,149.7 |
Source: Japan Meteorological Agency

=== Demographics ===
Per Japanese census data, the population of Yanai in 2020 is 30,799 people. Yanai has been conducting censuses since 1920.

Historical population
| Year | Pop. | ±% |
|---|---|---|
| 1950 | 50,375 | — |
| 1955 | 49,609 | −1.5% |
| 1960 | 46,447 | −6.4% |
| 1965 | 44,205 | −4.8% |
| 1970 | 42,841 | −3.1% |
| 1975 | 43,341 | +1.2% |
| 1980 | 42,912 | −1.0% |
| 1985 | 41,798 | −2.6% |
| 1990 | 40,478 | −3.2% |
| 1995 | 38,963 | −3.7% |
| 2000 | 37,251 | −4.4% |
| 2005 | 35,927 | −3.6% |
| 2010 | 34,719 | −3.4% |
| 2015 | 32,945 | −5.1% |
| 2020 | 30,799 | −6.5% |
Yanai population statistics

== History ==
The area of Yanai was part of ancient Suō Province. During the Edo Period, the area was part of the holdings of Iwakuni Domain. Following the Meiji restoration, the village of Yanai within Kumage District, Yamaguchi was established with the creation of the modern municipalities system on April 1, 1889. Yanai as elevated to town status on January 1, 1905. On March 31, 1951 Yanai annexed the villages of Hizumi, Shinjo, Yoda, and Iriku and was raised to city status. In the mid 1950s, the villages of Heigun island, Atsuki and Ihosho were subsequently annexed. On February 21, 2005, the town of Ōbatake (from Kuga District) was merged into Yanai.

== Government ==
Yanai has a mayor-council form of government with a directly elected mayor and a unicameral city council of 16 members. Yanai contributes one member to the Yamaguchi Prefectural Assembly. In terms of national politics, the city is part of the Yamaguchi 2nd district of the lower house of the Diet of Japan.

== Economy ==
Yanai has a rural economy based on agriculture (flowers and fruits), commercial fishing and food processing. Chugoku Electric Power's Yanai Thermal Power Station (LNG) is located in the city.

== Education ==
Yanai has 13 public elementary school and three public junior high schools operated by the city government, and two public high schools operated by the Yamaguchi Prefectural Board of Education. There is also one private high school.

== Transportation ==
=== Railway ===
JR West (JR West) - San'yō Main Line

- Ōbatake - Yanaiminato - Yanai

=== Highways ===
- National Route 188
- National Route 437

== Sister cities ==
- Kauai, Hawaii, United States
- Huainan, Anhui, China
- Zhangqiu District, Jinan, Shandong, China (friendship city)
