= Kumage, Yamaguchi =

Dissolved municipality in Yamaguchi prefecture, Japan

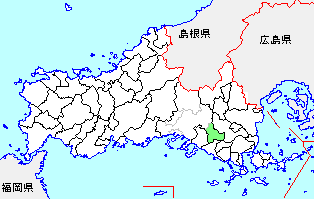
Map of Kumage, Yamaguchi

Kumage (熊毛町, Kumage-chō) was a town located in Kumage District, Yamaguchi Prefecture, Japan.

On April 21, 2003, Kumage, along with the cities of Tokuyama and Shinnan'yō, and the town of Kano (from Tsuno District), was merged to create the city of Shūnan.
