= Kano, Yamaguchi =

Dissolved municipality in Yamaguchi prefecture, Japan

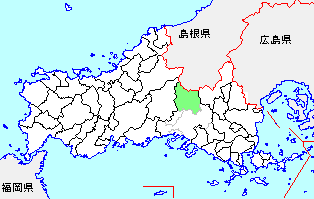
Map of Kano, Yamaguchi

Kano (鹿野町, Kano-chō) was a town located in Tsuno District, Yamaguchi Prefecture, Japan.

On April 21, 2003, Kano, along with the cities of Tokuyama and Shinnan'yō, and the town of Kumage (from Kumage District), was merged to create the city of Shūnan.
