= Shinnan'yō, Yamaguchi =

Dissolved municipality in Yamaguchi prefecture, Japan

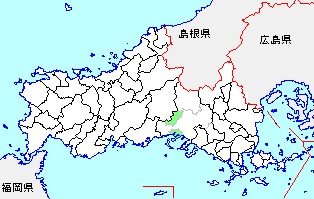
Shinnan'yō in Yamaguchi Prefecture

Shinnan'yō (新南陽市, Shinnan'yō-shi) was a city located in Yamaguchi Prefecture, Japan.

On April 21, 2003, Shinnan'yō, along with the city of Tokuyama, the town of Kumage (from Kumage District), and the town of Kano (from Tsuno District), was merged to create the city of Shūnan.
