= Yamato, Yamaguchi =

Dissolved municipality in Yamaguchi prefecture, Japan

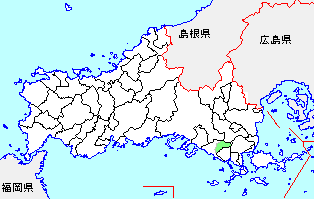
Yamato in Yamaguchi Prefecture

Yamato (大和町, Yamato-chō) was a town located in Kumage District, Yamaguchi Prefecture, Japan. Yamato was established as a village in 1943, and promoted to a town in 1971.

As of 2003, the town had an estimated population of 8,057 and a density of 251.08 persons per km^{2}. The total area was 32.09 km^{2}.

On October 4, 2004, Yamato was merged into the expanded city of Hikari and no longer exists as an independent municipality.
