= Yanaiminato Station =

Railway station in Yanai, Yamaguchi Prefecture, Japan

Yanaiminato Station 柳井港駅
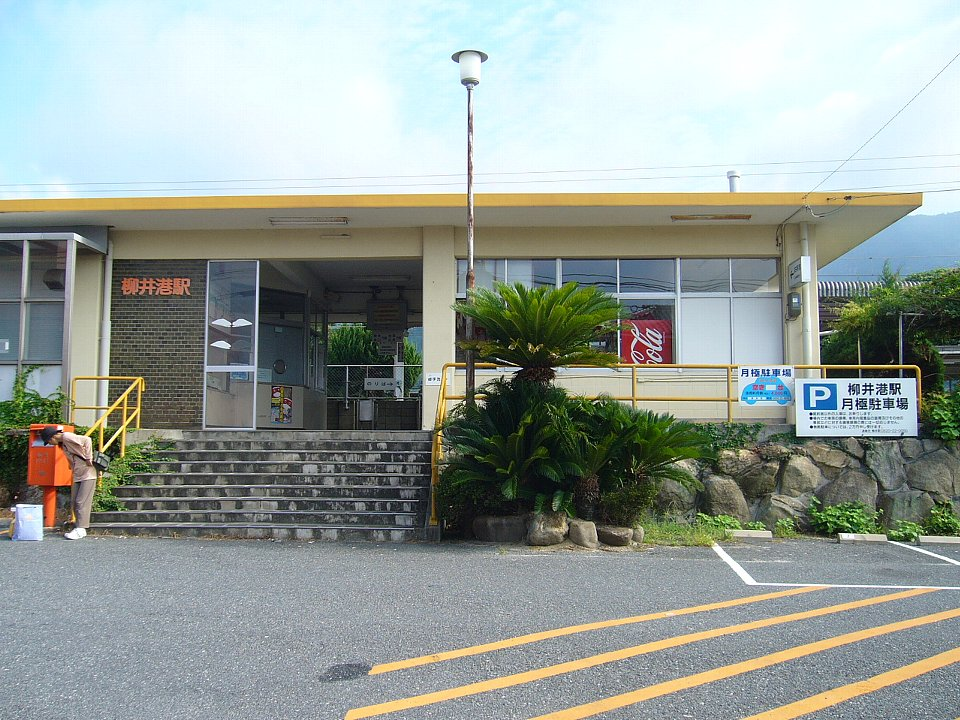
- Yanaiminato Station building, August 2006

General information
- Location: 139-1 Yanai, Yanai-shi, Yamaguchi-ken 742-0021; Japan
- Coordinates: 33°57′30″N 132°08′02″E
- Owner: West Japan Railway Company
- Operator: West Japan Railway Company
- Line: San'yō Line
- Distance: 376.4 km (233.9 miles) from Kobe
- Platforms: 2 side platforms
- Tracks: 2
- Connections: Bus stop

Construction
- Accessible: Yes

Other information
- Status: Unstaffed
- Website: Official website

History
- Opened: 20 April 1929; 97 years ago

Passengers
- FY2022: 206

Services
Preceding station	JR West	Following station
Yanai towards Shimonoseki	San'yō Line Local	Ōbatake towards Iwakuni
Location
- Location within Yamaguchi Prefecture Location within Japan

Yanaiminato Station (柳井港駅, Yanaiminato-eki) is a passenger railway station located in the city of Yanai, Yamaguchi Prefecture, Japan. It is operated by the West Japan Railway Company (JR West).

== Lines ==
Yanaiminato Station is served by the JR West Sanyō Main Line, and is located 376.4 kilometers from the terminus of the line at Kobe.

== Station layout ==
The station consists of two parallel side platforms connected by a footbridge. It formerly had one side platform and one island platform; however, the middle track has been discontinued. The station is unattended.

== Platforms ==
1	■ San'yō Line	for Yanai and Tokuyama
3	■ San'yō Line	for Iwakuni and Hiroshima

== History ==
Yanaiminato Station was opened on 20 April 1929. With the privatization of the Japan National Railway (JNR) on 1 April 1987, the station came under the aegis of the West Japan railway Company (JR West).

== Passenger statistics ==
In fiscal 2022, the station was used by an average of 206 passengers daily.

== Surrounding area ==
- Yanai Port
- Yanai Municipal Yanagihigashi Elementary School
- Yanai Municipal Tozaki Elementary School

== See also ==
- List of railway stations in Japan
