= Tsuno District, Yamaguchi =

Former district in Yamaguchi prefecture, Japan

Tsuno (都濃郡, Tsuno-gun) was a district located in Yamaguchi Prefecture, Japan.

== Towns and villages ==
- Kano

== Merger ==
- On April 21, 2003 - The town of Kano, along with the cities of Tokuyama and Shinnan'yō, and the town of Kumage (from Kumage District), was merged to create the city of Shūnan. Tsuno District was dissolved as a result of this merger.

== See also ==
- List of dissolved districts of Japan
