= Hirao =

Hirao 平生町
- Town
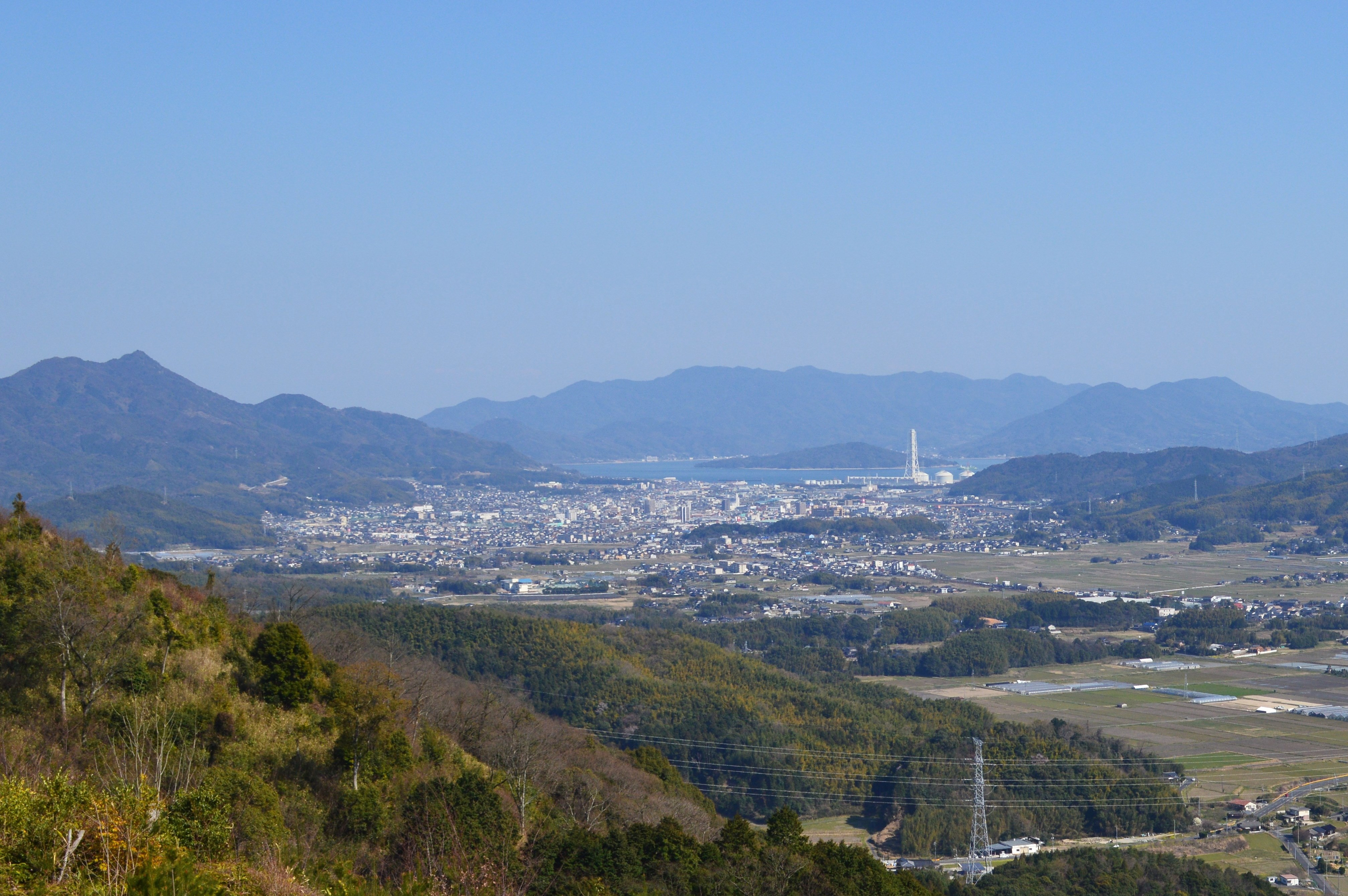
- Hirao town viewed from Mt. Iwaki

- Flag Emblem
- Interactive map of Hirao
- Location in Japan
- Coordinates: 33°56′17″N 132°04′24″E
- Country: Japan
- Region: Chūgoku; San'yō
- Prefecture: Yamaguchi
- District: Kumage

Government
  - Mayor: Kunihiro Asamoto

Area
  - Total: 34.59 km^{2} (13.36 sq mi)

Population (May 31, 2023)
  - Total: 11,064
  - Density: 319.9/km^{2} (828.4/sq mi)
- Time zone: UTC+09:00 (JST)
- City hall address: 210-1 Hirao-cho, Hirao-cho, Kumage-gun, Yamaguchi-ken
- Website: Official website
- Symbols
- Flower: Azalea, Chrysanthemum
- Tree: Pinus thunbergii

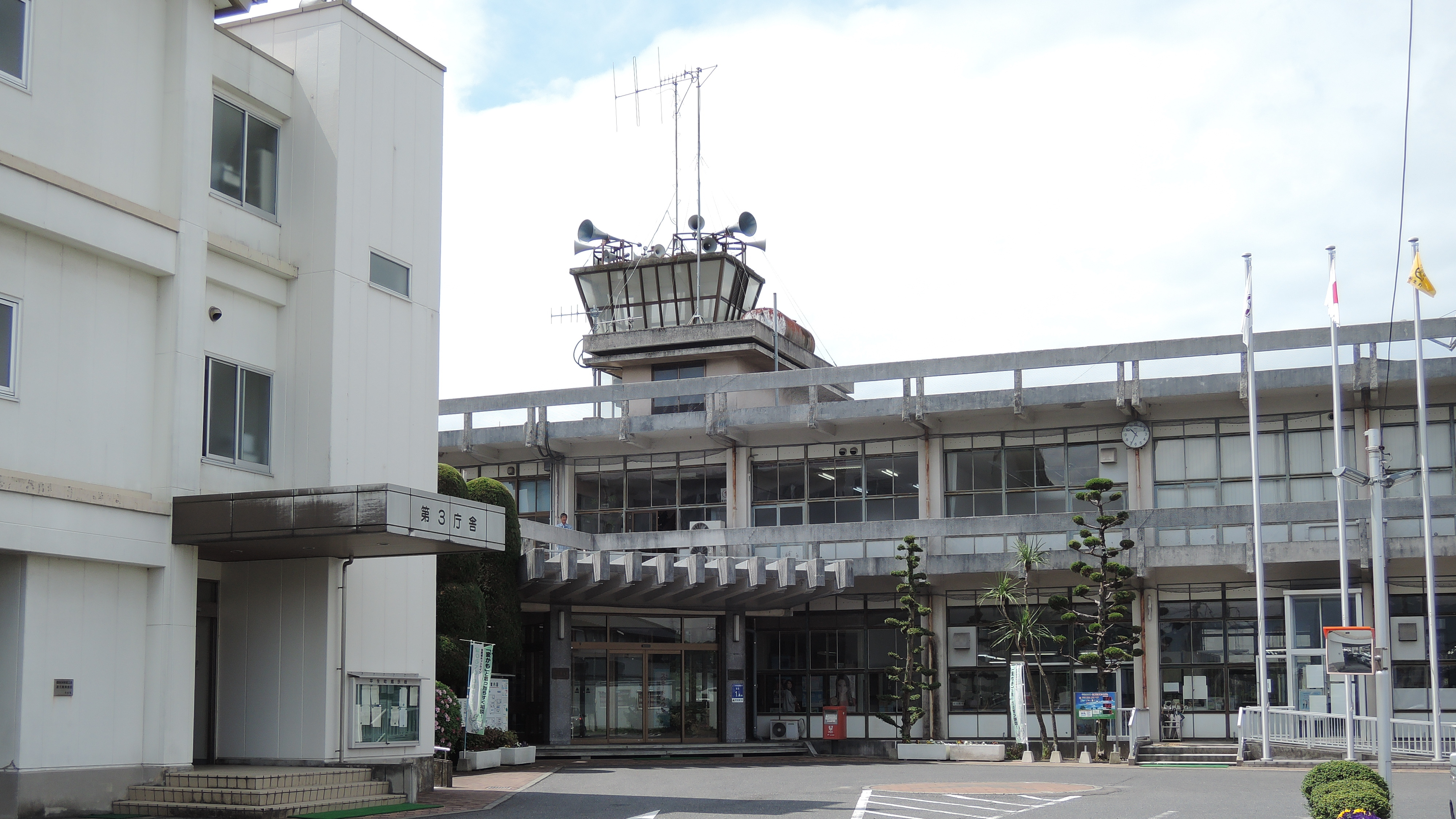
Hirao Town Hall

View from Ohosi

Hirao (平生町, Hirao-chō) is a town located in Kumage District, Yamaguchi Prefecture, Japan. As of 31 May 2023, the town had an estimated population of 11,064 in 5394 households and a population density of 320 persons per km^{2}. The total area of the town is 34.59 square kilometres (13.36 sq mi).

== Geography ==
The town extends approximately 11 kilometers north to south and 9 kilometers east to west, and is located on the coast of the Seto Inland Sea in southeastern Yamaguchi Prefecture. Parts of the town are within the borders of the Setonaikai National Park.

=== Neighbouring municipalities ===
Yamaguchi Prefecture

- Kaminoseki
- Tabuse
- Yanai

=== Climate ===
Hirao has a humid subtropical climate (Köppen climate classification Cfa) with very warm summers and cool winters. The average annual temperature in Hirao is 16.0 °C. The average annual rainfall is 1678 mm with September as the wettest month. The temperatures are highest on average in July, at around 26.2 °C, and lowest in January, at around 6.6 °C.

== Demographics ==
Per Japanese census data, the population of Hirao has been steady for the past 50 years.

Historical population
Year	Pop.	±%
1940	12,186	—
1950	16,636	+36.5%
1960	14,106	−15.2%
1970	13,111	−7.1%
1980	14,118	+7.7%
1990	14,801	+4.8%
2000	14,580	−1.5%
2010	13,484	−7.5%
Hirao population statistics

== History ==
The area of Hirao was part of an ancient Suō Province. During the Edo Period, the area was part of the holdings of Chōshū Domain. Following the Meiji restoration, the village of Hirao within Kumage District, Yamaguchi was established with the creation of the modern municipalities system on April 1, 1889. Hirao was elevated to town status on April 1, 1903. On January 1, 1955, Tabuse annexed the villages of Ono, Saga and Sone.

== Government ==
Hirao has a mayor-council form of government with a directly elected mayor and a unicameral town council of 12 members. Hirao, together with the towns of Kaminoseki and Tabuse contributes one member to the Yamaguchi Prefectural Assembly. In terms of national politics, the town is part of the Yamaguchi 2nd district of the lower house of the Diet of Japan.

== Economy ==
Hirao has a rural economy based on agriculture and commercial fishing. There is one small industrial park.

== Education ==
Hirao has two public elementary schools and one public junior high school operated by the town government, and one public high school operated by the Yamaguchi Prefectural Board of Education.

== Transportation ==
=== Railway ===
Hirao has no passenger railway service. The nearest station is the JR West Sanyo Main Line Yanai Station or Tabuse Station.

=== Highways ===
- National Route 188

== Noted people from Hirao ==
- Genki Abe, lawyer, police bureaucrat and cabinet minister in early Shōwa period Japan.
