= Kumage District, Yamaguchi =

District in Yamaguchi prefecture, Japan

Coordinates: 33.934°N 132.068°E

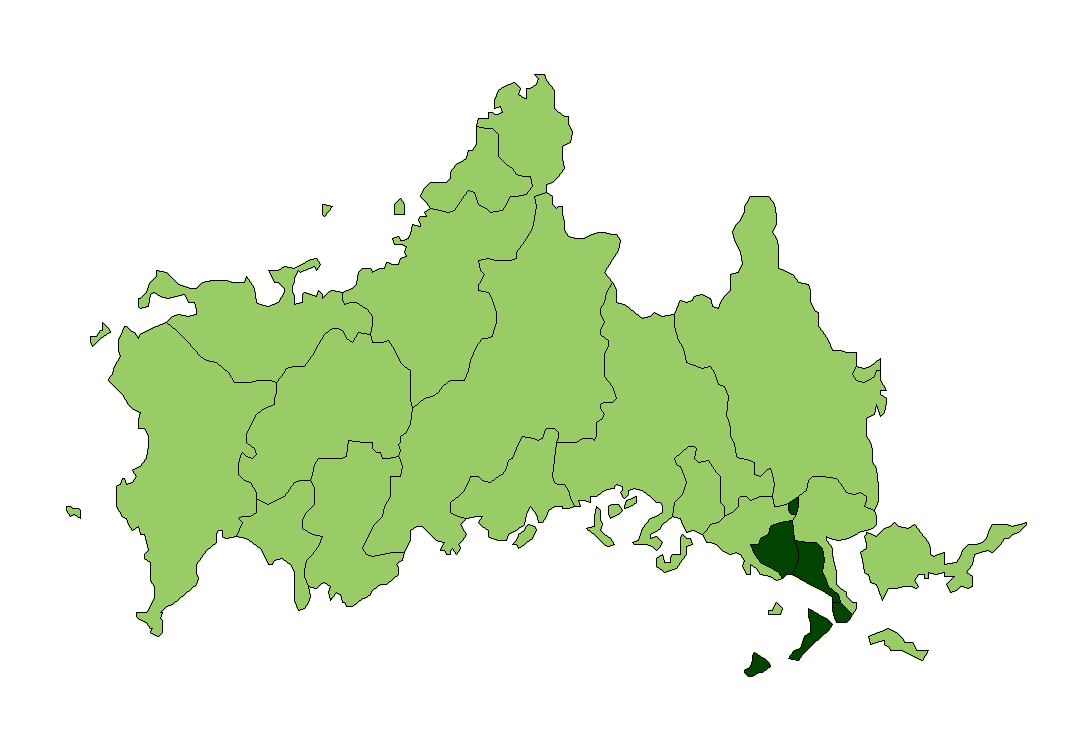
Location of Kumage District in Yamaguchi Prefecture

Kumage (熊毛郡, Kumage-gun) is a district located in Yamaguchi Prefecture, Japan.

As of 2003, the district has an estimated population of 42,778 and a density of 282.12 persons per km^{2}. The total area is 151.63 km^{2}.

== Towns and villages ==
- Hirao
- Kaminoseki
- Tabuse

== Mergers ==
- On April 21, 2003, the town of Kumage merged with the town of Kano, from Tsuno District, and the cities of Tokuyama and Shinnan'yō, to form the city of Shūnan.
- On October 4, 2004, the town of Yamato was merged into the city of Hikari.
