= Yanai Station =

Railway station in Yanai, Yamaguchi Prefecture, Japan

Yanai Station 柳井駅
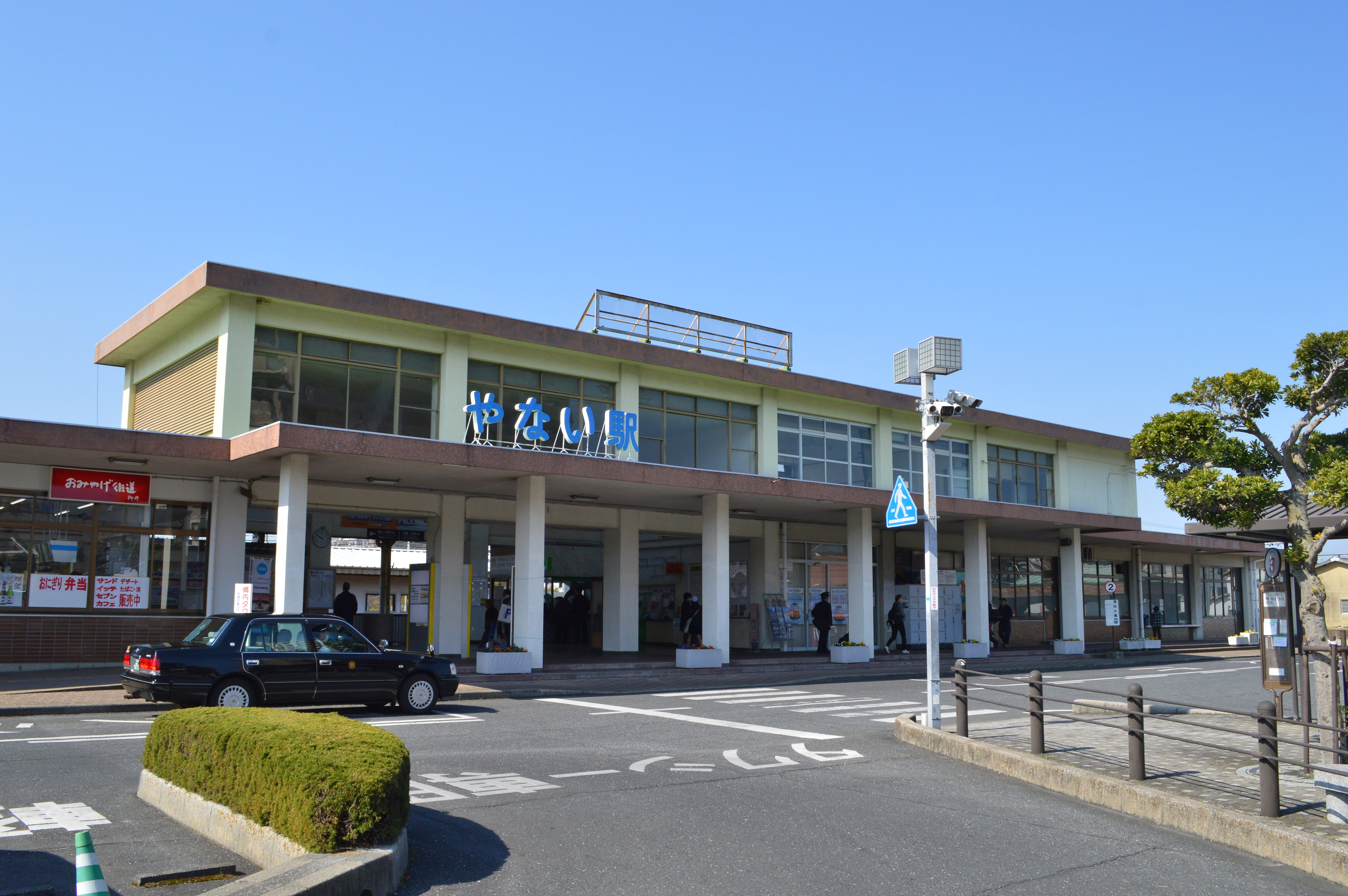
- Yanai Station in March 2016

General information
- Location: 2-18 Chūō, Yanai-shi, Yamaguchi-ken 742-0035; Japan
- Coordinates: 33°57′57.24″N 132°6′22.21″E
- Owner: West Japan Railway Company
- Operator: West Japan Railway Company
- Line: San'yō Line
- Distance: 379.2 km (235.6 miles) from Kobe
- Platforms: 2 side + 1 island platform
- Connections: Bus stop

Construction
- Accessible: Yes

Other information
- Status: Staffed
- Website: Official website

History
- Opened: 25 September 1897; 128 years ago
- Former names: Yanaitsu (to 1929)

Passengers
- FY2022: 1593

Services
Preceding station	JR West	Following station
Tabuse towards Shimonoseki	San'yō Line Local	Yanaiminato towards Iwakuni
Tokuyama One-way operation	San'yō Line For Osaka West Express Ginga	Iwakuni towards Osaka
Location
- Location within Yamaguchi Prefecture Location within Japan

Yanai Station (柳井駅, Yanai-eki) is a passenger railway station located in the city of Yanai, Yamaguchi Prefecture, Japan. It is operated by the West Japan Railway Company (JR West).

== Lines ==
Yanai Station is served by the JR West Sanyō Main Line, and is located 379.2 kilometers from the terminus of the line at Kobe.

== Station layout ==
The station consists of two opposed side platforms sandwiching a single island platform.The station building is located on the side of Platform 1, and the other platforms are connected by a footbridge. The station is staffed. The exit is on the north side. It is connected to the south side by an underground passage. A JNR Class C50 locomotive is preserved in a park in front of the station.

== Platforms ==
1, 3	■ San'yō Line	for Iwakuni and Hiroshima
3, 4, 5	■ San'yō Line	for Tokuyama and Hōfu

== History ==
Yanai Station was opened on 25 September 1897 as Yanaitsu Station (柳井津駅) on the San'yo Railway with the opening of the extension from Hiroshima to Tokuyama. The San'yo Railway was nationalized in 1906 and the line renamed the San'yo Main Line in 1909. The station was renamed "Yanai Station" on 20 April 1929. With the privatization of the Japan National Railway (JNR) on 1 April 1987, the station came under the aegis of the West Japan railway Company (JR West). A locomotive depot was located on the south side of the station from when the station opened in 1897 until it was abolished in 1984. Only the switchyard remained for a while, but in 1996 the tracks were removed and the site was redeveloped into a shopping center and condominiums.

== Passenger statistics ==
In fiscal 2022, the station was used by an average of 1593 passengers daily.

== Surrounding area ==
- Yanai City Hall
- Important Preservation Districts for Groups of Historic Buildings

== See also ==
- List of railway stations in Japan
