= Hashirano Station =

Railway station in Iwakuni, Yamaguchi Prefecture, Japan

Hashirano Station 柱野駅
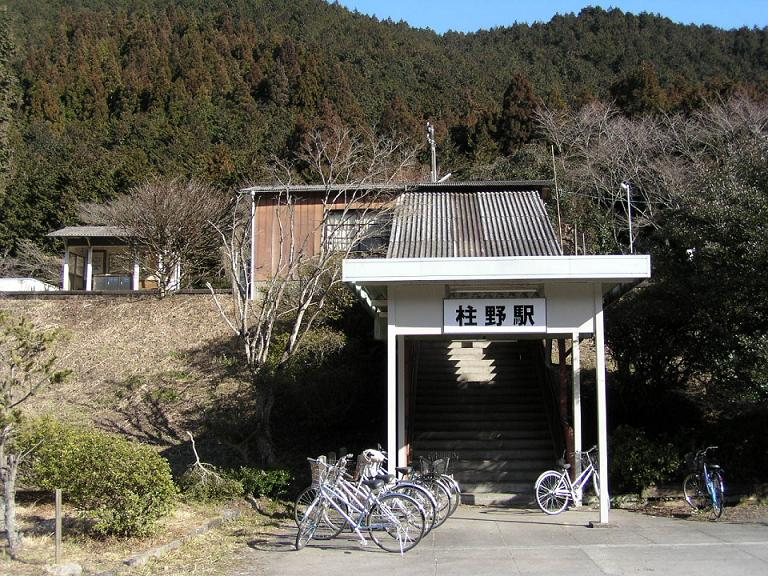
- 610-2 Hashirano Station in February 2008

General information
- Location: Hashirano, Iwakuni-shi, Yamaguchi-ken 741-0073; Japan
- Coordinates: 34°8′36.23″N 132°9′15.71″E
- Owner: West Japan Railway Company
- Operator: West Japan Railway Company
- Line: Gantoku Line
- Distance: 20.6 km (12.8 miles) from Iwakuni
- Platforms: 1 island platform
- Tracks: 2
- Connections: Bus stop

Other information
- Status: Unstaffed
- Website: Official website

History
- Opened: 1 December 1934; 91 years ago

Passengers
- FY2020: 27

Services
Preceding station	JR West	Following station
Kimmeiji towards Kushigahama	Gantoku Line Local	Kawanishi towards Iwakuni
Location
- Location within Yamaguchi Prefecture Location within Japan

Hashirano Station (柱野駅, Hashirano-eki) is a passenger railway station located in the city of Iwakuni, Yamaguchi Prefecture, Japan. It is operated by the West Japan Railway Company (JR West).

== Lines ==
Hashirano Station is served by the JR West Gantoku Line, and is located 8.5 kilometers from the terminus of the line at Iwakuni.

== Station layout ==
The station consists of one island platform on an embankment. The platform is reached by a flight of stairs and a level crossing. There are no station facilities and the station in unattended.

== Platforms ==
entry side	■ Gantoku Line	for Iwakuni
opposite side	■ Gantoku Line	for Kuga and Tokuyama

== History ==
Hashirano Station was opened on 1 December 1934. With the privatization of the Japan National Railway (JNR) on 1 April 1987, the station came under the aegis of the West Japan railway Company (JR West).

== Passenger statistics ==
In fiscal 2020, the station was used by an average of 27 passengers daily.

== Surrounding area ==
- Misho River

== See also ==
- List of railway stations in Japan
