= Takamizu Station =

Railway station in Shūnan, Yamaguchi Prefecture, Japan

Takamizu Station 高水駅
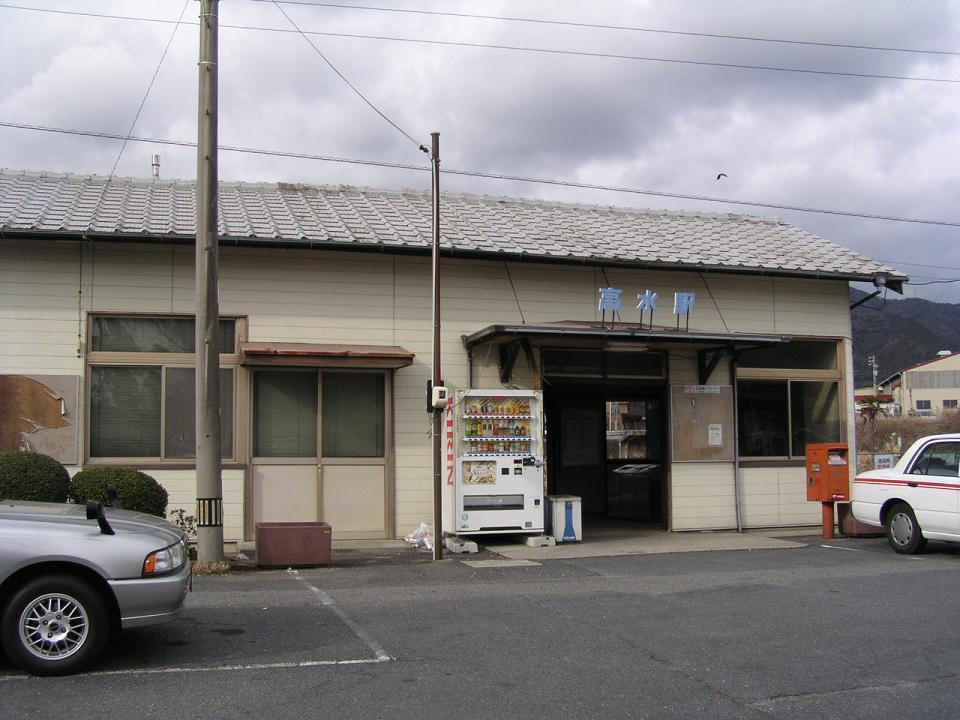
- Takamizu Station in January 200

General information
- Location: 3-chōme-5 Takamizuhara, Shūnan-shi, Yamaguchi-ken 745-0662; Japan
- Coordinates: 34°3′19.48″N 131°58′23.00″E
- Owner: West Japan Railway Company
- Operator: West Japan Railway Company
- Line: Gantoku Line
- Distance: 28.8 km (17.9 miles) from Iwakuni
- Platforms: 2 side platforms
- Tracks: 2
- Connections: Bus stop

Other information
- Status: Unstaffed
- Website: Official website

History
- Opened: 28 March 1934; 92 years ago

Passengers
- FY2020: 169

Services
| Preceding station | JR West | Following station |
|---|---|---|
| Katsuma towards Kushigahama | Gantoku Line Local | Yonekawa towards Iwakuni |
Location
- Location within Yamaguchi Prefecture Location within Japan

Takamizu Station (高水駅, Takamizu-eki) is a passenger railway station located in the city of Shūnan, Yamaguchi Prefecture, Japan. It is operated by the West Japan Railway Company (JR West). It is located in the Kumage neighborhood of Shūnan, in a semi-rural area.

== Lines ==
Takamizu Station is served by the JR West Gantoku Line, and is located 28.8 kilometers from the terminus of the line at Iwakuni.

== Station layout ==
The station consists of two unnumbered opposed side platforms connected by a footbridge. The station is unattended. On the platform for trains bound for Iwakuni, there is a statue of a hooded crane.

== Platforms ==
| station side | ■ Gantoku Line | for Kushigahama and Tokuyama |
| opposite side | ■ Gantoku Line | for Kuga and Iwakuni |

== History ==
Takamizu Station was opened on 28 March 1934. With the privatization of the Japan National Railway (JNR) on 1 April 1987, the station came under the aegis of the West Japan railway Company (JR West).

== Passenger statistics ==
In fiscal 2020, the station was used by an average of 169 passengers daily.

== Surrounding area ==
- Shunan City Kumage General Branch (former Kumage Town Main Office)
- Yamaguchi Prefectural Kumage Kita High School

== See also ==
- List of railway stations in Japan
