= Shūnan =

Shūnan 周南市
- City
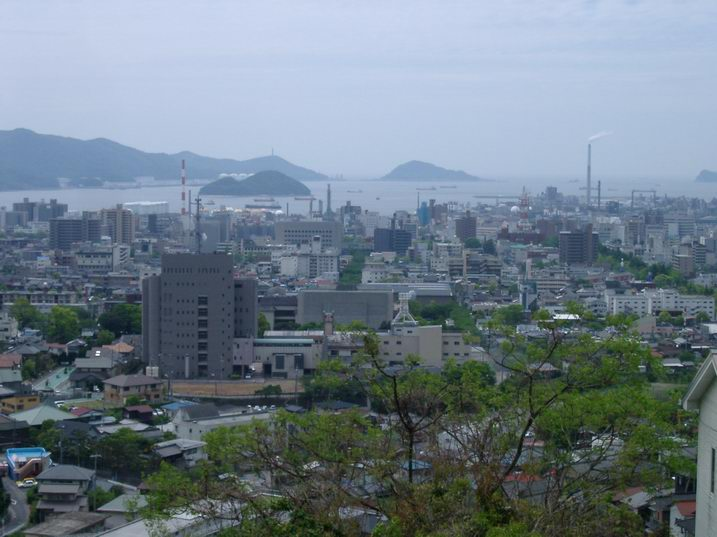
- View of downtown Tokuyama area

- Flag Emblem
- Location of Shūnan in Yamaguchi Prefecture

- Location in Japan
- Coordinates: 34°3′18″N 131°48′22″E
- Country: Japan
- Region: Chūgoku (San'yō)
- Prefecture: Yamaguchi

Government
  - Mayor: Ritsuko Fujii

Area
  - Total: 656.29 km^{2} (253.39 sq mi)

Population (May 31, 2023)
  - Total: 137,019
  - Density: 208.78/km^{2} (540.73/sq mi)
- Time zone: UTC+09:00 (JST)
- City hall address: 1-1 Kisan-dōri, Shūnan-shi, Yamaguchi-ken 745-8655
- Website: Official website
- Symbols
- Flower: Salvia splendens
- Tree: Cinnamomum camphora

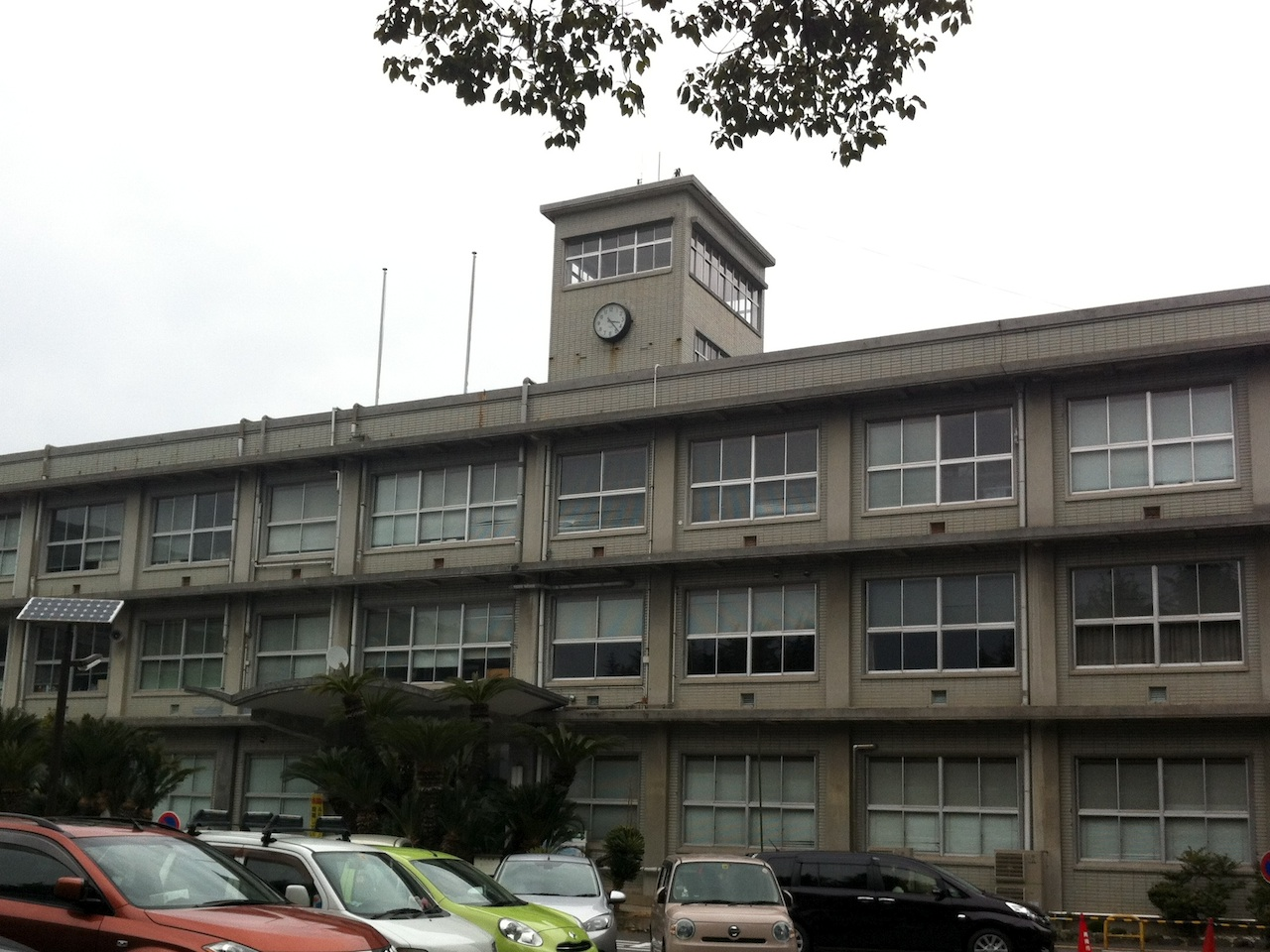
Shūnan City Hall

Shūnan city center

Shūnan (周南市, Shūnan-shi) is a city in Yamaguchi Prefecture, Japan. As of 31 May 2023, the city had an estimated population of 137,019 in 6828 households and a population density of 210 persons per km^{2}. The total area of the city is 656.29 square kilometres (253.39 sq mi).

== Geography ==
Shūnan is located in south-central Yamaguchi Prefecture, bordered by the Seto Inland Sea to the south. Together with the cities of Kudamatsu and Hikari, with which it has strong ties in terms of industry, economy, and population exchange; the three cities are informally called the "Shunan District". The coastal area is part of the Seto Industrial Complex, with many chemical plants, refineries and heavy industry. The northern part, on the other hand, is part of the Chugoku Mountains, dotted with rural areas.

=== Neighbouring municipalities ===
Shimane Prefecture

- Yoshika

Yamaguchi Prefecture

- Hikari
- Hōfu
- Iwakuni
- Kudamatsu
- Yamaguchi

=== Climate ===
Shūnan has a humid subtropical climate (Köppen climate classification Cfa) with very warm summers and cool winters. The average annual temperature in Shūnan is 13.5 °C. The average annual rainfall is 1834 mm with September as the wettest month. The temperatures are highest on average in July, at around 24.9 °C, and lowest in January, at around 2.4 °C.

== Demographics ==
Per Japanese census data, the population of Shūnan has been steady for the past 50 years.

Historical population
Year	Pop.	±%
1940	12,993	—
1950	17,191	+32.3%
1960	133,729	+677.9%
1970	146,312	+9.4%
1980	166,318	+13.7%
1990	164,594	−1.0%
2000	157,383	−4.4%
2010	149,508	−5.0%
Shūnan population statistics

== History ==
The area of Shūnan was part of an ancient Suō Province. Its name is derived from the first character (周) of the name of the former Suō Province (周防国), and the character for south (南), reflecting its location, comprising much of the southern part of the old province. During the Edo Period, the area was part of the holdings of Tokuyama Domain. Following the Meiji restoration, the village of Tokuyama within Tsuno District, Yamaguchi was established with the creation of the modern municipalities system on April 1, 1889. Tokuyama as elevated to town status on October 15, 1900 and to city status on October 15, 1935. Tokuyama expanded by annexing many neighboring villages on April 1, 1942, April 1, 1944, October 1, 1955 and January 1, 1966. On April 21, 2003 the city of Shūnan was founded by the merger of the cities of Tokuyama and Shinnan'yō, the town of Kumage (from Kumage District), and the town of Kano (from Tsuno District). Tsuno District was dissolved as a result of this merger.

== Government ==
Shūnan has a mayor-council form of government with a directly elected mayor and a unicameral city council of 30 members. Shūnan contributes four members to the Yamaguchi Prefectural Assembly. In terms of national politics, the city is divided between the Yamaguchi 1st district and Yamaguchi 2nd district of the lower house of the Diet of Japan.

== Economy ==
The main industry of Shūnan is the heavy and chemical industry. The Shūnan Petroleum Complex developed from the former Tokuyama Naval Arsenal. Major chemical manufacturers Tokuyama and Tosoh, petroleum wholesaler Idemitsu Kosan, and stainless steel processing company Nippon Steel Nisshin Steel have bases in the coastal area along Tokuyama Bay. The food processing company, Shimaya, has headquarters in Shunan.

== Education ==
Shūnan has 27 public elementary schools and 14 public junior high schools operated by the city government, and five public high school operated by the Yamaguchi Prefectural Board of Education. There is one private middle school and one private high school, and the prefecture also operates two special education schools.

Shunan University is located in the city.

== Transportation ==
=== Railway ===
JR West – San'yō Shinkansen

- Tokuyama

JR West (JR West) - San'yō Main Line

- Kushigahama - Tokuyama - Shinnan-yō - Fukugawa - Heta

JR West (JR West) - Gantoku Line

- Takamizu - Katsuma - Ōkawachi - < Suō-Kubo - Ikunoya - Suō-Hanaoka >- Kushigahama

=== Highways ===
- Chūgoku Expressway
- San'yō Expressway
- National Route 2
- National Route 315
- National Route 376
- National Route 434
- National Route 489

== Sister cities ==
- Delfzijl, Netherlands (1990, Shinnan'yō)
- Townsville, Australia (1990, Tokuyama)
- São Bernardo do Campo, Brazil (1973, Tokuyama)

== Sports ==
Before Tokuyama became part of Shūnan, it was one of the host cities of the official 1998 Women's Volleyball World Championship.

== Notable people from Shūnan ==
- Mayuko Fukuda, actress
- Kodama Gentarō, Imperial Japanese Army general and 4th Governor General of Taiwan
- Keiichi Hayashi, diplomat
- Asami Imai, voice actress
- Satoshi Inoue, politician
- Masahiko Kōmura, politician
- Milk Morizono manga artist
- Mitsuda Yasunori, independent video game composer and professional musician

== See also ==
- Mitake
