= Suō-Kubo Station =

Railway station in Kudamatsu, Yamaguchi Prefecture, Japan

Suō-Kubo Station 周防久保駅
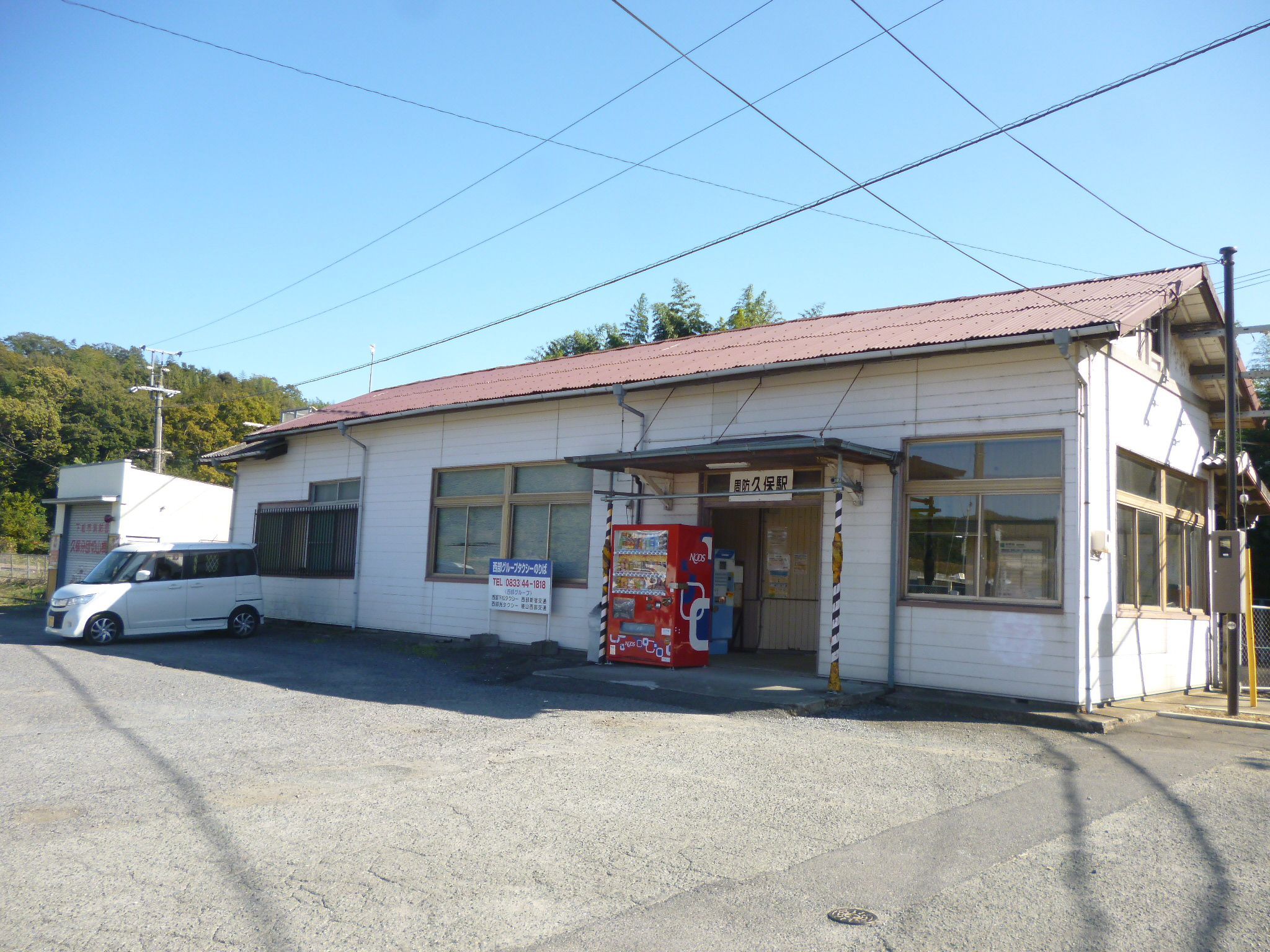
- Suō-Kubo Station in May 2021

General information
- Location: Kurumaki, Kudamatsu-shi, Yamaguchi-ken 744-0051; Japan
- Coordinates: 34°1′45.02″N 131°55′8.77″E
- Owner: West Japan Railway Company
- Operator: West Japan Railway Company
- Line: Gantoku Line
- Distance: 34.7 km (21.6 miles) from Iwakuni
- Platforms: 2 side platforms
- Tracks: 2
- Connections: Bus stop

Construction
- Accessible: Yes

Other information
- Status: Unstaffed
- Website: Official website

History
- Opened: 28 March 1934; 92 years ago

Passengers
- FY2020: 59

Services
Preceding station	JR West	Following station
Ikunoya towards Kushigahama	Gantoku Line Local	Ōkawachi towards Iwakuni
Location
- Location within Yamaguchi Prefecture Location within Japan

Suō-Kubo Station (周防久保駅, Suō-Kubo-eki) is a passenger railway station located in the city of Kudamatsu, Yamaguchi Prefecture, Japan. It is operated by the West Japan Railway Company (JR West).

== Lines ==
Suō-Kubo Station is served by the JR West Gantoku Line, and is located 34.7 kilometers from the terminus of the line at Iwakuni.

== Station layout ==
The station consists of two ground-level unnumbered side platforms connected by a footbridge. The station is unattended.

== Platforms ==
1	■ Gantoku Line	for Kuga and Iwakuni
2	■ Gantoku Line	for Kushigahama and Tokuyama

== History ==
Suō-Kubo Station was opened on 28 March 1934. With the privatization of the Japan National Railway (JNR) on 1 April 1987, the station came under the aegis of the West Japan railway Company (JR West).

== Passenger statistics ==
In fiscal 2020, the station was used by an average of 59 passengers daily.

== Surrounding area ==
- Japan National Route 2
- Kudamatsu City Kubo Elementary School
- Kudamatsu City Kubo Junior High School
- Kudamatsu Municipal Toyo Elementary School

== See also ==
- List of railway stations in Japan
