= Nishi-Iwakuni Station =

Railway station in Iwakuni, Yamaguchi Prefecture, Japan

Nishi-Iwakuni Station 西岩国駅
- Nishi-Iwakuni Station in January 2026

General information
- Location: 6-chōme-15 Nishimi, Iwakuni-shi, Yamaguchi-ken 741-0061; Japan
- Coordinates: 34°9′46.16″N 132°11′42.57″E
- Owner: West Japan Railway Company
- Operator: West Japan Railway Company; Nishikigawa Railway
- Line: Gantoku Line Nishikigawa Seiryū Line
- Distance: 3.7 km (2.3 miles) from Iwakuni
- Platforms: 1 side + 1 island platform
- Tracks: 2
- Connections: Bus stop

Other information
- Status: Unstaffed
- Website: Official website

History
- Opened: 15 April 1929; 97 years ago
- Former names: Iwakuni (until 1942)

Passengers
- FY2020: 349

Services
Preceding station	JR West	Following station
Kawanishi towards Kushigahama	Gantoku Line Local	Iwakuni Terminus
Location
- Location within Yamaguchi Prefecture Location within Japan

Nishi-Iwakuni Station (西岩国駅, Nishi-Iwakuni-eki) is a passenger railway station located in the city of Iwakuni, Yamaguchi Prefecture, Japan. It is operated jointly by the West Japan Railway Company (JR West).

== Lines ==
Nishi-Iwakuni Station is served by the JR West Gantoku Line, and is located 3.7 kilometers from the terminus of the line at Iwakuni. It is also served by trains of the third sector Nishikigawa Seiryū Line from Nishikichō, although the station itself is purely a JR West station.

== Station layout ==
The station consists of one side platform and one island platform connected by a footbridge; however, the middle track (Platform 2) has been discontinued. The station is unattended.

=== Platforms ===
1	■ Gantoku Line	for Iwakuni
3	■ Gantoku Line	for Kushigahama and Tokuyama for Nishikicho

== History ==
The station opened on 15 April 1929, initially named Iwakuni Station. It was renamed Nishi-Iwakuni in 1942, and at the same time, the original Marifu Station was renamed Iwakuni Station. With the privatization of the Japan National Railway (JNR) on 1 April 1987, the station came under the aegis of the West Japan railway Company (JR West).

== Passenger statistics ==
In fiscal 2020, the station was used by an average of 349 passengers daily.

== Surrounding area ==
- Iwakuni Prison
- Iwakuni Nishikimi Post Office
- Iwakuni Municipal Baseball Stadium

== See also ==
- List of railway stations in Japan
