= Kimmeiji Station =

Railway station in Iwakuni, Yamaguchi Prefecture, Japan

Kimmeiji Station 欽明路駅
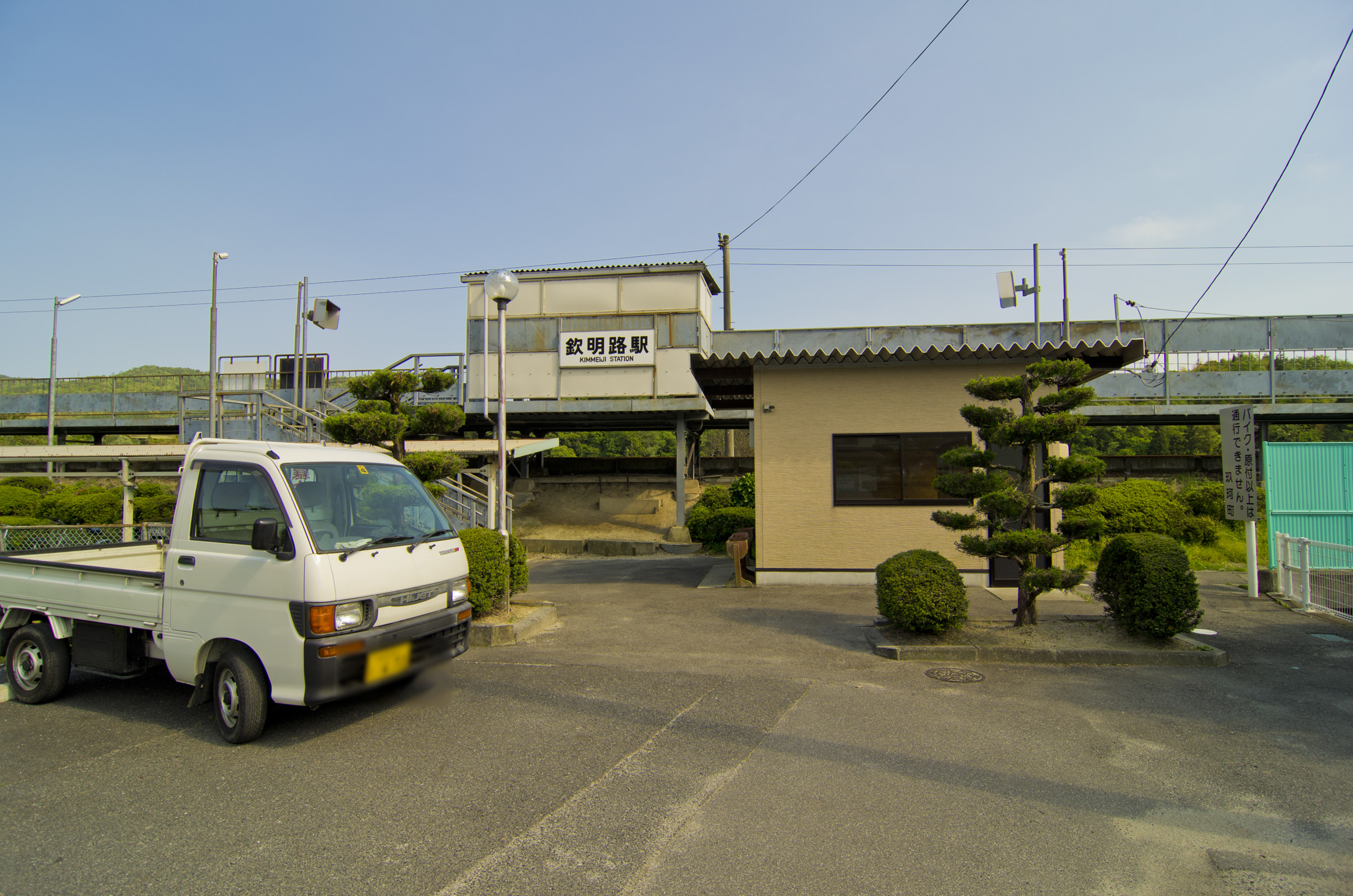
- Kinmeiji Station in May 2012

General information
- Location: 1529-7, Kuga-machi Nakanoguchi, Iwakuni-shi, Yamaguchi-ken 742-0344; Japan
- Coordinates: 34°6′15.11″N 132°6′5.41″E
- Owner: West Japan Railway Company
- Operator: West Japan Railway Company
- Line: Gantoku Line
- Distance: 15.2 km (9.4 miles) from Iwakuni
- Platforms: 1 side platform
- Tracks: 1
- Connections: Bus stop

Other information
- Status: Unstaffed
- Website: Official website

History
- Opened: 27 September 1990; 36 years ago

Passengers
- FY2020: 26

Services
Preceding station	JR West	Following station
Kuga towards Kushigahama	Gantoku Line Local	Hashirano towards Iwakuni
Location
- Location within Yamaguchi Prefecture Location within Japan

Kimmeiji Station (欽明路駅, Kinmeiji-eki) is a passenger railway station located in the city of Iwakuni, Yamaguchi Prefecture, Japan. It is operated by the West Japan Railway Company (JR West). It is located in the rural northeastern part of Kuga.

== Lines ==
Kinmeiji Station is served by the JR West Gantoku Line, and is located 15.2 kilometers from the terminus of the line at Iwakuni.

== Station layout ==
The station consists of one side platform serving a single bi-directional track. There is no station building, but only a small prefabricated shed used as a waiting room. The station is unattended.

== History ==
Kinmeiji Station was opened on 27 September 1990 by local petition.

== Passenger statistics ==
In fiscal 2020, the station was used by an average of 26 passengers daily.

== Surrounding area ==
- Kuga Tobu Community Center
- Sanyo Expressway Kuga Parking Area
- Japan National Route 2

== See also ==
- List of railway stations in Japan
