= Ōkawachi Station =

Railway station in Shūnan, Yamaguchi Prefecture, Japan

Ōkawachi Station 大河内駅
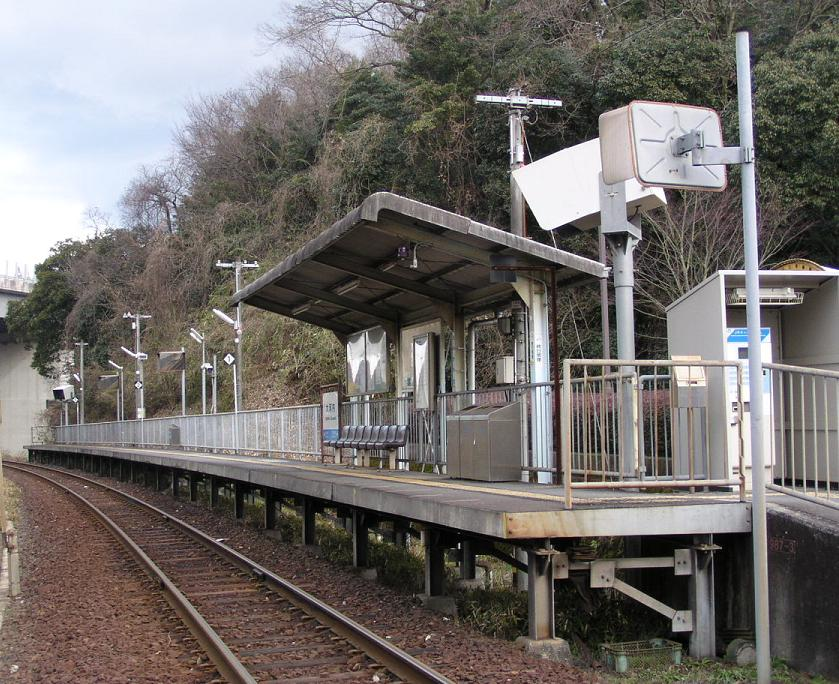
- Ōkawachi Station in March 2008

General information
- Location: Okawachi, Shūnan, Yamaguchi-ken 745-0651; Japan
- Coordinates: 34°1′51.51″N 131°56′2.90″E
- Owner: West Japan Railway Company
- Operator: West Japan Railway Company
- Line: Gantoku Line
- Distance: 33.3 km (20.7 miles) from Iwakuni
- Platforms: 1 side platforms
- Tracks: 1
- Connections: Bus stop

Construction
- Accessible: Yes

Other information
- Status: Unstaffed
- Website: Official website

History
- Opened: 27 March 1987; 39 years ago

Passengers
- FY2020: 100

Services
Preceding station	JR West	Following station
Suō-Kubo towards Kushigahama	Gantoku Line Local	Katsuma towards Iwakuni
Location
- Location within Yamaguchi Prefecture Location within Japan

Ōkawachi Station (大河内駅, Ōkawachi-eki) is a passenger railway station located in the city of Shūnan, Yamaguchi Prefecture, Japan. It is operated by the West Japan Railway Company (JR West). It is located in the Kumage neighborhood of Shūnan, in a semi-rural area.

== Lines ==
Ōkawachi Station is served by the JR West Gantoku Line, and is located 33.3 kilometers from the terminus of the line at Iwakuni.

== Station layout ==
The station consists of one side platform serving a single bi-directional track. There is no station building and the station is unattended.

== History ==
Ōkawachi Station was opened on 27 March 1987. With the privatization of the Japan National Railway (JNR) on 1 April 1987, the station came under the aegis of the West Japan railway Company (JR West).

== Passenger statistics ==
In fiscal 2020, the station was used by an average of 100 passengers daily.

== Surrounding area ==
- Japan National Route 2
- Jiyugaoka Housing Complex
- Sachigaoka Housing Complex
- Yumegaoka Housing Complex

== See also ==
- List of railway stations in Japan
