= Katsuma Station =

Railway station in Shūnan, Yamaguchi Prefecture, Japan

Katsuma Station 勝間駅
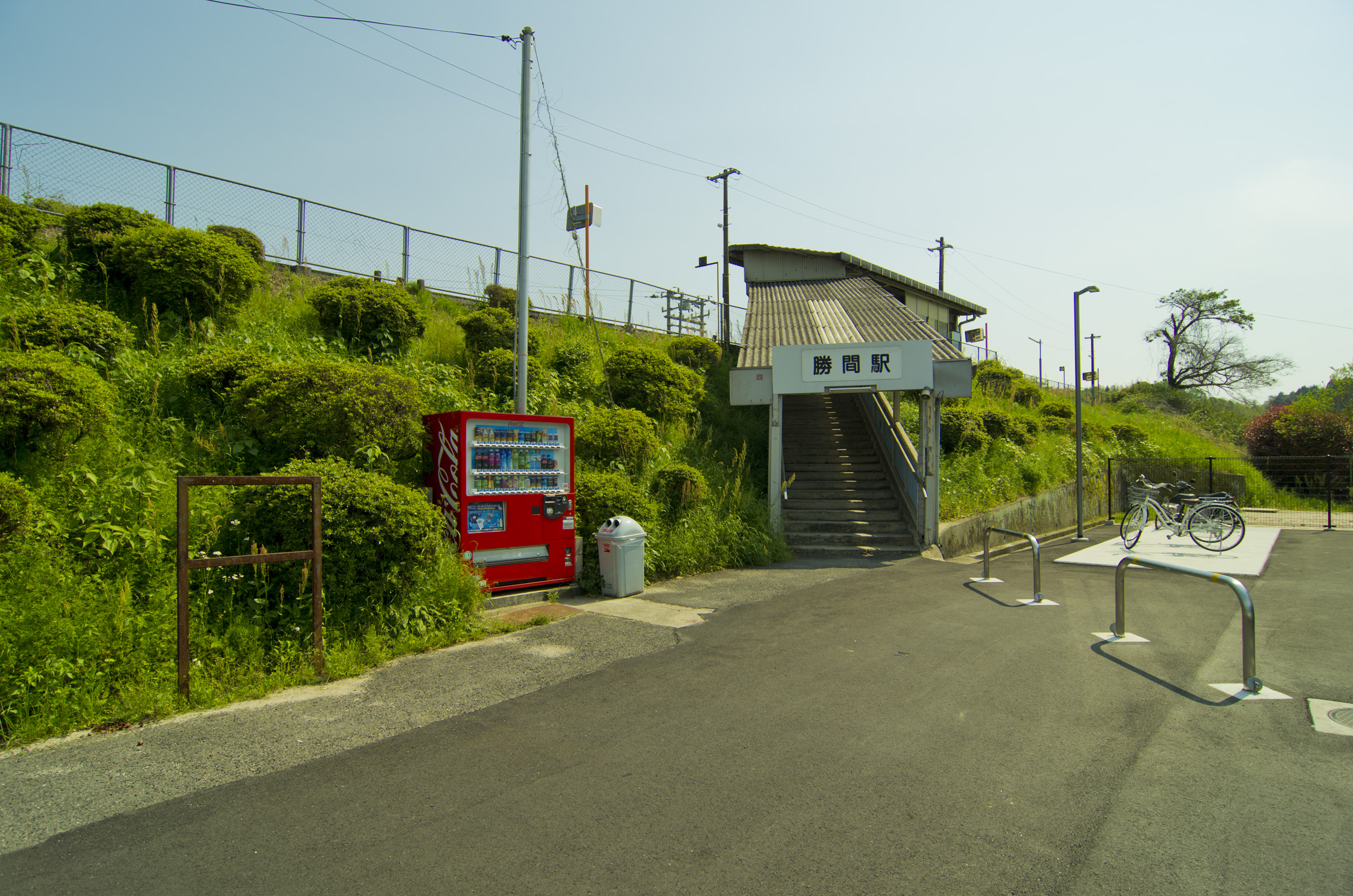
- Katsuma Station in May 2012

General information
- Location: Yobisaka Nishishita Bamba 1183, Shūnan-shi, Yamaguchi-ken 745-0612; Japan
- Coordinates: 34°2′31.29″N 131°57′14.43″E
- Owner: West Japan Railway Company
- Operator: West Japan Railway Company
- Line: Gantoku Line
- Distance: 31.1 km (19.3 miles) from Iwakuni
- Platforms: 1 side platforms
- Tracks: 1
- Connections: Bus stop

Construction
- Accessible: No

Other information
- Status: Unstaffed
- Website: Official website

History
- Opened: 1 December 1934; 91 years ago

Passengers
- FY2020: 134

Services
| Preceding station | JR West | Following station |
|---|---|---|
| Ōkawachi towards Kushigahama | Gantoku Line Local | Takamizu towards Iwakuni |
Location
- Location within Yamaguchi Prefecture Location within Japan

Katsuma Station (勝間駅, Katsuma-eki) is a passenger railway station located in the city of Shūnan, Yamaguchi Prefecture, Japan. It is operated by the West Japan Railway Company (JR West). It is located in the Kumage part of Shūnan, and is near the Sun Wing Kumage (サンウイング熊毛) community center.

== Lines ==
Katsuma Station is served by the JR West Gantoku Line, and is located 31.1 kilometers from the terminus of the line at Iwakuni.

== Station layout ==
The station consists of one side platform serving a single bi-directional track on an embankment. There is no station building and the station is unattended.

== History ==
Katsuma Station was opened on 1 December 1934. With the privatization of the Japan National Railway (JNR) on 1 April 1987, the station came under the aegis of the West Japan railway Company (JR West).

== Passenger statistics ==
In fiscal 2020, the station was used by an average of 134 passengers daily.

== Surrounding area ==
- Japan National Route 2
- Shunan Country Club
- Shunan Municipal Katsuma Elementary School

== See also ==
- List of railway stations in Japan
