= Hon-Yura Station =

Railway station in Yamaguchi, Yamaguchi Prefecture, Japan

Hon-Yura Station 本由良駅
- Hon-Yura Station in March 2026

General information
- Location: Sayama, Yamaguchi-shi, Yamaguchi-ken, 754-0894; Japan
- Coordinates: 34°1′55.25″N 131°20′37.13″E
- Owner: West Japan Railway Company
- Operator: West Japan Railway Company
- Line: San'yō Line
- Distance: 467.7 km (290.6 miles) from Kobe
- Platforms: 2 side platforms
- Tracks: 3
- Connections: Bus stop

Other information
- Status: Unstaffed
- Website: Official website

History
- Opened: 3 December 1900; 125 years ago
- Former names: Ajisu (to 1950)

Passengers
- FY2022: 218

Services
Preceding station	JR West	Following station
Kotō towards Shimonoseki	San'yō Line Local	Kagawa towards Iwakuni
Location
- Location within Yamaguchi Prefecture Location within Japan

Hon-Yura Station (本由良駅, Hon-Yura-eki) is a passenger railway station located in the city of Yamaguchi, Yamaguchi Prefecture, Japan. It is operated by the West Japan Railway Company (JR West).

== Lines ==
Hon-Yura Station is served by the JR West San'yō Main Line, and is located 467.7 kilometers from the terminus of the line at Kobe.

== Station layout ==
The station consists of two opposed side platforms connected by a footbridge. The station is unattended.

== Platforms ==
1	■ San'yō Line	for Shin-Yamaguchi and Tokuyama
3	■ San'yō Line	for Ube and Shimonoseki

== History ==
Hon-Yura Station was opened on 3 December 1900 as Ajisu Station (阿知須駅) on the San'yō Railway when the line was extended from Mitajiri (present-day Hōfu Station) to Asa Station. The San'yō Railway was railway nationalized in 1906 and the line renamed the San'yō Main Line in 1909. The station was renamed 1 June 1950. With the privatization of the Japan National Railway (JNR) on 1 April 1987, the station came under the aegis of the West Japan Railway Company (JR West).

== Passenger statistics ==
In fiscal 2022, the station was used by an average of 218 passengers daily.

== Surrounding area ==
- Yura River
- Yamaguchi Ube Road (Yamaguchi Prefectural Road No. 6 Yamaguchi Ube Line)

== See also ==
- List of railway stations in Japan
