= Kotō Station =

Railway station in Ube, Yamaguchi Prefecture, Japan

Kotō Station 厚東駅
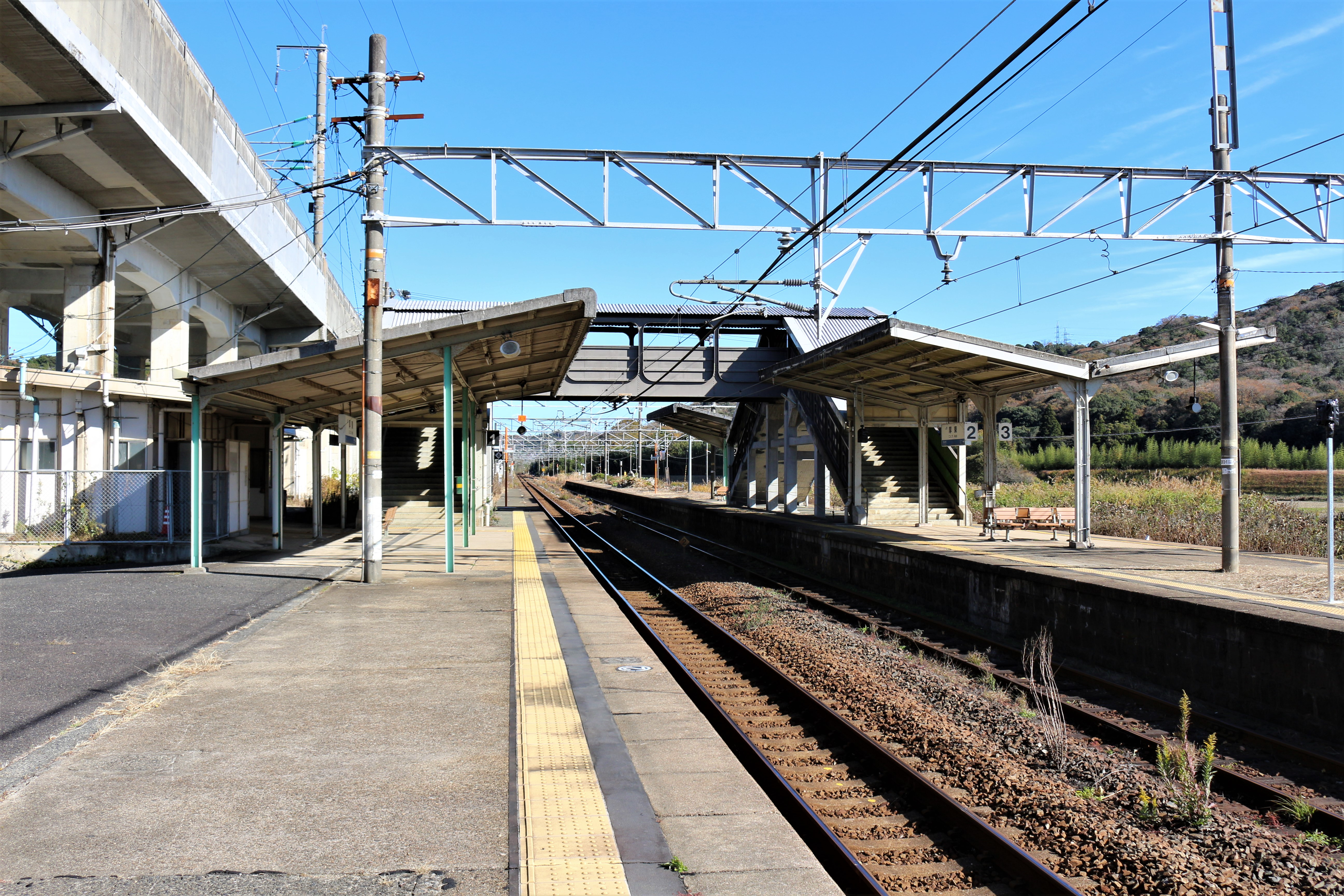
- Kotō Station in November 2021

General information
- Location: 997 Miyanoshita, Yoshimi, Ube-shi, Yamaguchi-ken 759-0122; Japan
- Coordinates: 34°2′19.46″N 131°16′4.25″E
- Owner: West Japan Railway Company
- Operator: West Japan Railway Company
- Line: San'yō Line
- Distance: 478.0 km (297.0 miles) from Kobe
- Platforms: 1 side + 1 island platform
- Tracks: 3
- Connections: Bus stop

Other information
- Status: Unstaffed
- Website: Official website

History
- Opened: 3 December 1900; 125 years ago
- Former names: Funaki Station (to 1916)

Passengers
- FY2022: 81 (daily)

Services
Preceding station	JR West	Following station
Ube towards Shimonoseki	San'yō Line Local	Hon-Yura towards Iwakuni
Location
- Location within Yamaguchi Prefecture Location within Japan

Kotō Station (厚東駅, Kotō-eki) is a passenger railway station located in the city of Ube, Yamaguchi Prefecture, Japan. It is operated by the West Japan Railway Company (JR West).

== Lines ==
Kotō Station is served by the JR West San'yō Main Line, and is located 478.0 kilometers from the terminus of the line at Kobe.

== Station layout ==
The station consists of one side platform and one island platform connected by a footbridge. The station building, which is located underneath the elevated tracks of the Sanyo Shinkansen, is unattended.

== Platforms ==
1	■ San'yō Line	for Shin-Yamaguchi and Tokuyama
2	■ San'yō Line	not in operation
3	■ San'yō Line	for Ube and Shimonoseki

== History ==
Kotō Station was opened on 3 December 1900 as Funaki Station (船木駅) on the San'yō Railway when the line was extended from Mitajiri (present-day Hōfu Station) to Asa Station. The San'yō Railway was railway nationalized in 1906 and the line became the San'yō Main Line in 1909. The station name was changed on 1 November 1916. With the privatization of the Japan National Railway (JNR) on 1 April 1987, the station came under the aegis of the West Japan Railway Company (JR West).

== Passenger statistics ==
In fiscal 2022, the station was used by an average of 81 passengers daily.

== Surrounding area ==
- Japan National Route 2

== See also ==
- List of railway stations in Japan
