= Ikunoya Station =

Railway station in Kudamatsu, Yamaguchi Prefecture, Japan

Ikunoya Station 生野屋駅
- Ikunoya Station in January 2008

General information
- Location: 3-chōme-10 Ikunoyaminami, Kudamatsu-shi, Yamaguchi-ken 744-0033; Japan
- Coordinates: 34°2′7.46″N 131°53′13.80″E
- Owner: West Japan Railway Company
- Operator: West Japan Railway Company
- Line: Gantoku Line
- Distance: 38.0 km (23.6 miles) from Iwakuni
- Platforms: 1 side platform
- Tracks: 1
- Connections: Bus stop

Construction
- Accessible: Yes

Other information
- Status: Unstaffed
- Website: Official website

History
- Opened: 27 March 1987; 39 years ago

Passengers
- FY2020: 93

Services
Preceding station	JR West	Following station
Suō-Hanaoka towards Kushigahama	Gantoku Line Local	Suō-Kubo towards Iwakuni
Location
- Location within Yamaguchi Prefecture Location within Japan

Ikunoya Station (生野屋駅, Ikunoya-eki) is a passenger railway station located in the city of Kudamatsu, Yamaguchi Prefecture, Japan. It is operated by the West Japan Railway Company (JR West).

== Lines ==
Ikunoya Station is served by the JR West Gantoku Line, and is located 38.0 kilometers from the terminus of the line at Iwakuni.

== Station layout ==
The station consists of one side platform serving a single bi-directional track. There is no station building and the station is unattended.

== History ==
Ikunoya Station was opened on 27 March 1987. With the privatization of the Japan National Railway (JNR) on 1 April 1987, the station came under the aegis of the West Japan railway Company (JR West).

== Passenger statistics ==
In fiscal 2020, the station was used by an average of 93 passengers daily.

== Surrounding area ==
- Japan National Route 2

== See also ==
- List of railway stations in Japan
