= MV Sage Sagittarius =

Bulk carrier built in 2000

History
- Name: Sage Sagittarius
- Port of registry: Panama
- Launched: 27 December 2000
- Status: Active

General characteristics
- Type: Bulk carrier
- Tonnage: 73,427 DWT
- Length: 234.93 m (770 ft 9 in)
- Beam: 43 m (141 ft 1 in)
- Draught: 10.5 m (34 ft 5 in)

MV Sage Sagittarius is a bulk carrier built in 2000. The vessel is operated by the NYK Line.

In 2012 three men died aboard the vessel on a routine return voyage from Japan to Newcastle, New South Wales, Australia, to pick up a bulk load of coal. On the way to Newcastle approximately 470 nautical miles (870 km; 540 mi) from the coast of Queensland in the Coral Sea when one of the crew was reported missing. Australian authorities were notified, and the ship turned around, and a 36-hour search commenced.

A company official was dispatched to investigate and landed in Brisbane and helicoptered to the vessel along with two security officers. The ship was diverted to Port Kembla and was met by a large number of Australian Federal Police officers who searched the ship and collected evidence. Although all of the crew had not been interviewed, the ship proceeded to Newcastle, where the body of the chief engineer was found with multiple injuries after having toppled over the edge of a railing and fallen 11 metres (36 ft) as the ship berthed. New South Wales Police officers investigated, with many of the seamen being taken from the vessel to be interviewed. Nearly all the crew and the captain of the vessel were flown out of the country two days later. Four days after the second death, the vessel steamed out of Newcastle and back to Japan, where it berthed at Kudamatsu Port two weeks later. The ship was unloaded for three days when the body of the company official who had been dispatched to investigate was found crushed in a conveyor belt.
