= Yonekawa =

Yonekawa (Japanese: 米河 or Japanese: 米川) may refer to:

- Akihiro Yonekawa (Japanese: 米河 彰大, born 1972), Japanese wrestler and singer, better known as Kesen Numajiro
- Yonekawa Station (Japanese: 米川駅), railway station in Iwakuni, Yamaguchi, Japan
