= Kagawa Station (Yamaguchi) =

Railway station in Yamaguchi, Yamaguchi Prefecture, Japan

Kagawa Station 嘉川駅
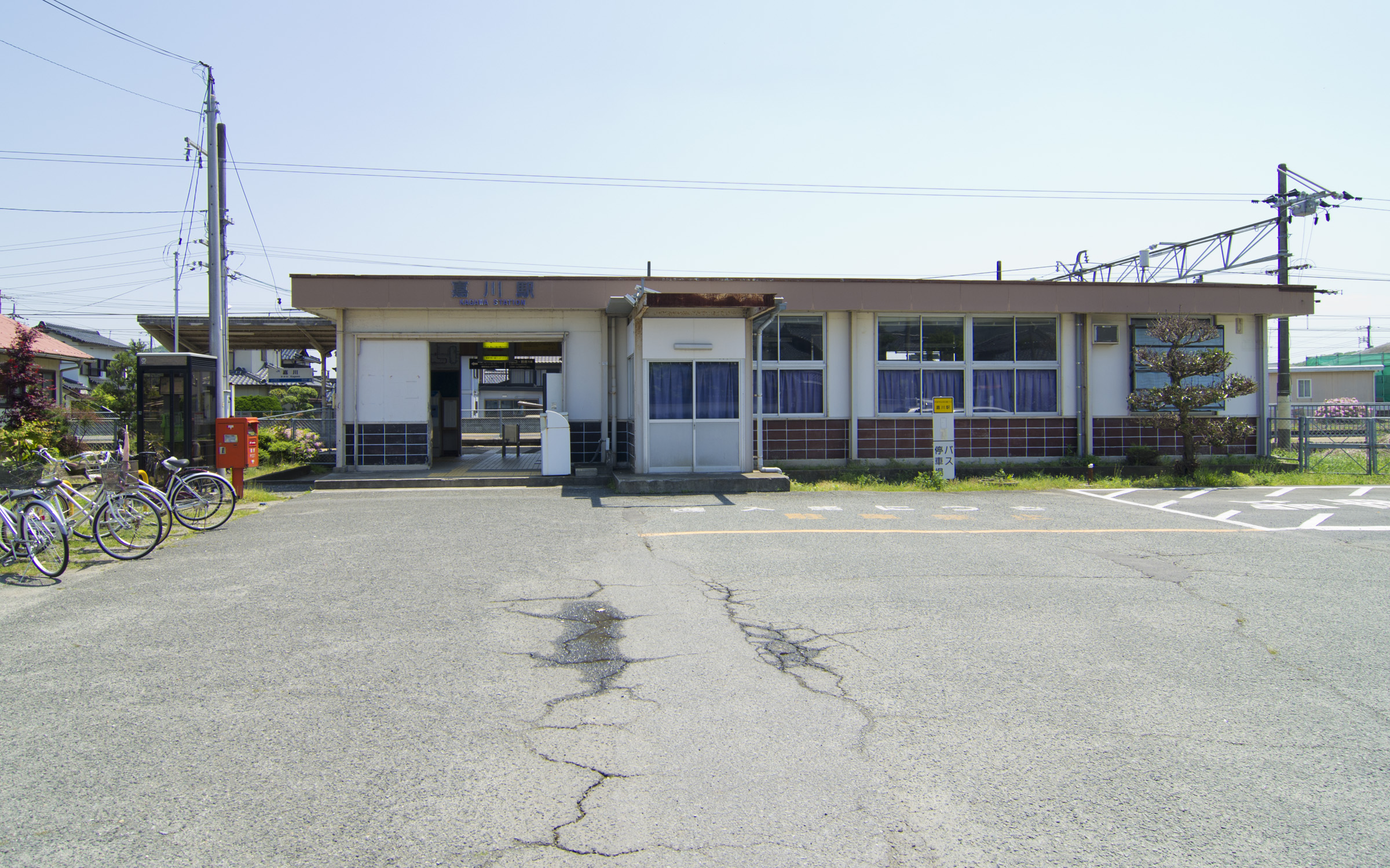
- Kagawa Station in May 2012

General information
- Location: Kagawa, Yamaguchi-shi, Yamaguchi-ken, 754-0897; Japan
- Coordinates: 34°3′58.3″N 131°22′12.27″E
- Owner: West Japan Railway Company
- Operator: West Japan Railway Company
- Line: San'yō Line
- Distance: 463.2 km (287.8 miles) from Kobe
- Platforms: 2 side platforms
- Tracks: 3
- Connections: Bus stop

Other information
- Status: Unstaffed
- Website: Official website

History
- Opened: 3 December 1900; 125 years ago

Passengers
- FY2022: 153

Services
Preceding station	JR West	Following station
Hon-Yura towards Shimonoseki	San'yō Line Local	Shin-Yamaguchi towards Iwakuni
Location
- Location within Yamaguchi Prefecture Location within Japan

Kagawa Station (嘉川駅, Kagawa-eki) is a passenger railway station located in the city of Yamaguchi, Yamaguchi Prefecture, Japan. It is operated by the West Japan Railway Company (JR West).

== Lines ==
Kagawa Station is served by the JR West San'yō Main Line, and is located 463.2 kilometers from the terminus of the line at Kobe.

== Station layout ==
The station consists of two opposed side platforms connected by a footbridge. The station is unattended.

== Platforms ==
1	■ San'yō Line	for Shin-Yamaguchi and Tokuyama
3	■ San'yō Line	for Ube and Shimonoseki

== History ==
Kagawa Station was opened on 3 December 1900 as a station on the San'yō Railway when the line was extended from Mitajiri (present-day Hōfu Station) to Asa Station. The San'yō Railway was railway nationalized in 1906, and the line was renamed the San'yō Main Line in 1909. With the privatization of the Japan National Railway (JNR) on 1 April 1987, the station came under the aegis of the West Japan Railway Company (JR West).

== Passenger statistics ==
In fiscal 2022, the station was used by an average of 153 passengers daily.

== Surrounding area ==
- Yamaguchi City Hall Kagawa Branch Office
- Yamaguchi Municipal Kawanishi Junior High School

== See also ==
- List of railway stations in Japan
