= Suō-Takamori Station =

Railway station in Iwakuni, Yamaguchi Prefecture, Japan

Suō-Takamori Station 周防高森駅
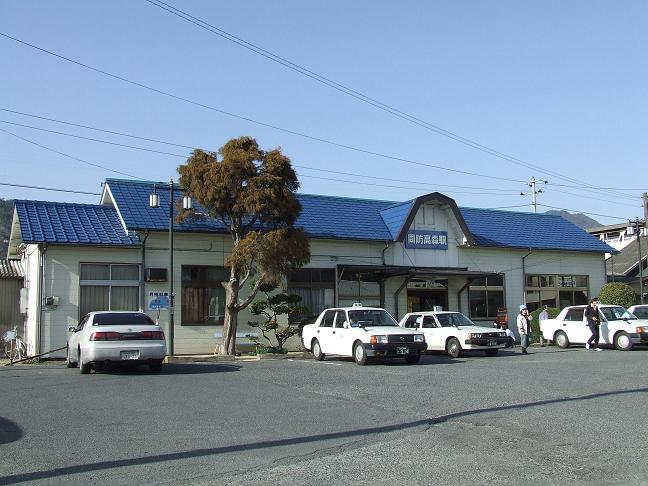
- Suō-Takamori Station in March 2008

General information
- Location: 1550-2 Shimokuhara, Sutocho, Iwakuni-shi, Yamaguchi-ken 742-0417; Japan
- Coordinates: 34°5′26.67″N 132°2′47.52″E
- Owner: West Japan Railway Company
- Operator: West Japan Railway Company
- Line: Gantoku Line
- Distance: 20.6 km (12.8 miles) from Iwakuni
- Platforms: 2 side platforms
- Tracks: 2
- Connections: Bus stop

Other information
- Status: Staffed
- Website: Official website

History
- Opened: 1 December 1934; 91 years ago

Passengers
- FY2020: 392

Services
Preceding station	JR West	Following station
Yonekawa towards Kushigahama	Gantoku Line Local	Kuga towards Iwakuni
Location
- Location within Yamaguchi Prefecture Location within Japan

Suō-Takamori Station (周防高森駅, Suō-Takamori-eki) is a passenger railway station located in the city of Iwakuni, Yamaguchi Prefecture, Japan. It is operated by the West Japan Railway Company (JR West). It is located in central Shūtō.

== Lines ==
Suō-Takamori Station is served by the JR West Gantoku Line, and is located 20.6 kilometers from the terminus of the line at Iwakuni.

== Station layout ==
The station consists of two unnumbered opposed side platforms connected by a footbridge. The station is staffed.

== Platforms ==
station side	■ Gantoku Line	for Kushigahama and Tokuyama
opposite side	■ Gantoku Line	for Kuga and Iwakuni

== History ==
Suō-Takamori Station was opened on 1 December 1934. With the privatization of the Japan National Railway (JNR) on 1 April 1987, the station came under the aegis of the West Japan railway Company (JR West).

== Passenger statistics ==
In fiscal 2020, the station was used by an average of 392 passengers daily.

== Surrounding area ==
- Iwakuni City Hall Shuto General Office (former Shuto Town Hall)
- Yamaguchi Prefectural Takamori Midori Junior High School/Takamori High School
- Iwakuni Municipal Shuto Junior High School
- Iwakuni Municipal Takamori Junior High School

== See also ==
- List of railway stations in Japan
