= Kagawa Station =

Kagawa Station is the name of two train stations in Japan:

- Kagawa Station (Kanagawa) (香川駅)
- Kagawa Station (Yamaguchi) (嘉川駅)
