= Yonekawa Station =

Railway station in Iwakuni, Yamaguchi Prefecture, Japan

Yonekawa Station 米川駅
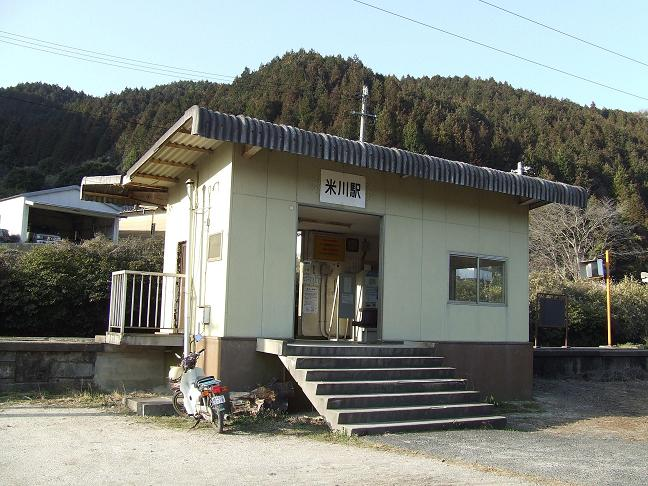
- Yonekawa Station in March 2008

General information
- Location: Shūtō-machi Sagawa 1722-5, Iwakuni-shi, Yamaguchi-ken 742-0424; Japan
- Coordinates: 34°4′28.37″N 132°0′52.23″E
- Owner: West Japan Railway Company
- Operator: West Japan Railway Company
- Line: Gantoku Line
- Distance: 24.4 km (15.2 miles) from Iwakuni
- Platforms: 1 side platform
- Tracks: 1
- Connections: Bus stop

Other information
- Status: Unstaffed
- Website: Official website

History
- Opened: 1 December 1934

Passengers
- FY2020: 10

Services
Preceding station	JR West	Following station
Takamizu towards Kushigahama	Gantoku Line Local	Suō-Takamori towards Iwakuni
Location
- Location within Yamaguchi Prefecture Location within Japan

Yonekawa Station (米川駅, Yonekawa-eki) is a passenger railway station located in the city of Iwakuni, Yamaguchi Prefecture, Japan. It is operated by the West Japan Railway Company (JR West).

== Lines ==
Yonekawa Station is served by the JR West Gantoku Line, and is located 24.4 kilometers from the terminus of the line at Iwakuni.

== Station layout ==
The station consists of one side platform serving a single bi-directional track. The station is unattended.

== History ==
Yonekawa Station was opened on 1 December 1934. With the privatization of the Japan National Railway (JNR) on 1 April 1987, the station came under the aegis of the West Japan railway Company (JR West).

== Passenger statistics ==
In fiscal 2020, the station was used by an average of 10 passengers daily.

== Surrounding area ==
- Yamaguchi Prefectural Route 144 Kokuga Line

== See also ==
- List of railway stations in Japan
