= Iwakuni Junior College =

Private junior college in Iwakuni, Yamaguchi, Japan

Coordinates: 34°08′25″N 132°12′22″E

Iwakuni Junior College (岩国短期大学, Iwakuni tanki daigaku) is a private junior college in Iwakuni, Yamaguchi, Japan. The school was established in 1971 as a women's junior college. In 1998 it became coeducational.
