= Japan National Route 434 =

Road in Japan

National Route 434
- 国道434号

Route information
- Length: 166.9 km (103.7 mi)

Location
- Country: Japan

Highway system
- National highways of Japan; Expressways of Japan
← National Route 433	→ National Route 435

National Route 434 is a national highway of Japan connecting Shūnan, Yamaguchi and Miyoshi, Hiroshima in Japan, with a total length of 166.9 km (103.71 mi).
