= Gantoku Line =

Railway line in Yamaguchi prefecture, Japan

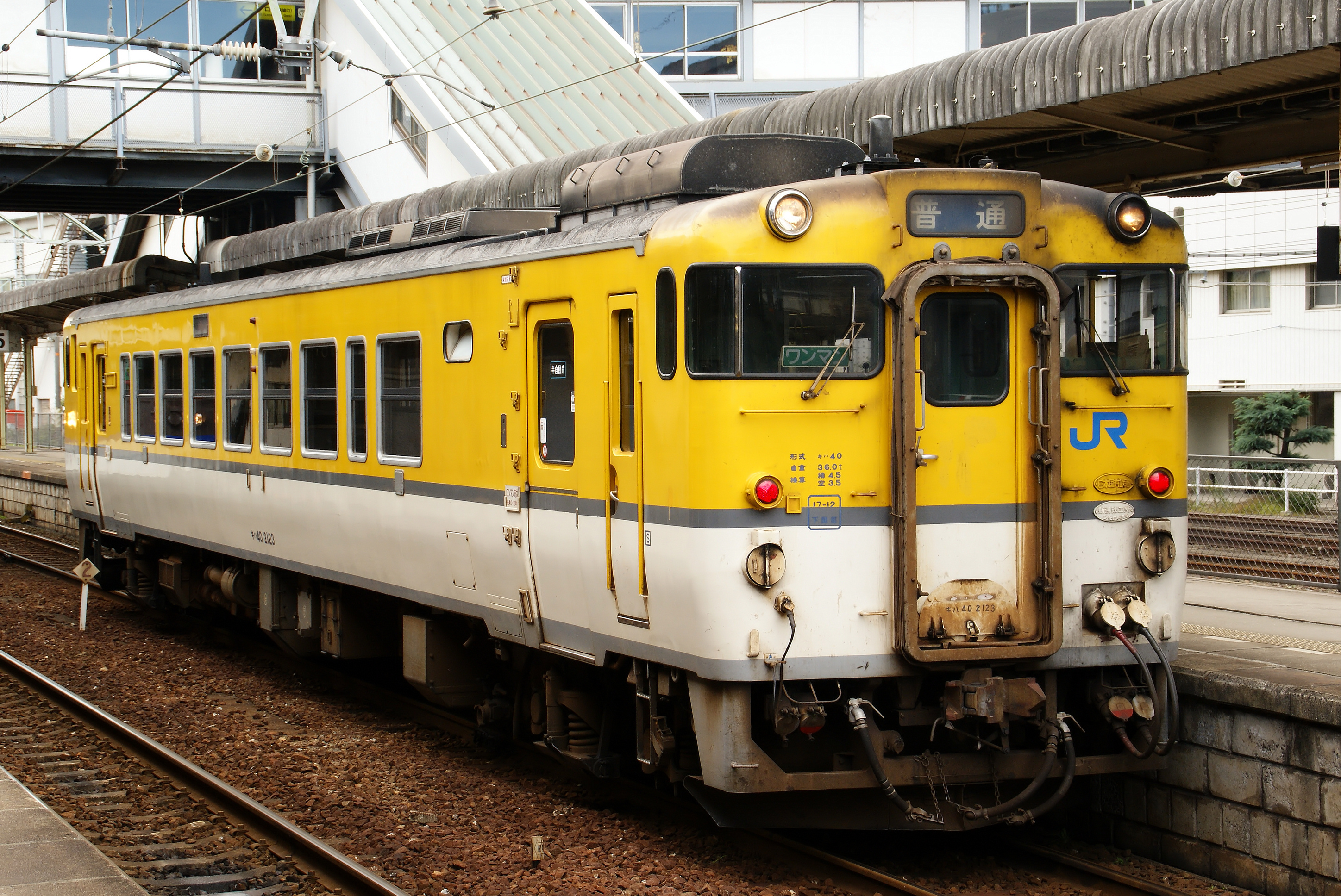
- A KiHa 40-2000 DMU

Overview
- Native name: 岩徳線
- Status: In operation
- Owner: JR West
- Locale: Yamaguchi Prefecture
- Termini: Iwakuni; Kushigahama
- Stations: 15

Service
- Type: Regional rail
- Operator(s): JR West
- Rolling stock: KiHa 40 series DMU

History
- Opened: 5 April 1929

Technical
- Line length: 43.7 km (27.2 mi)
- Number of tracks: Entire line single tracked
- Character: Rural
- Track gauge: 1,067 mm (3 ft 6 in)
- Electrification: None
- Operating speed: 95 km/h (59 mph)

The Gantoku Line (岩徳線, Gantoku-sen) is a 43.7 km (27.2 mi) railway line operated by West Japan Railway Company (JR West) in Yamaguchi Prefecture, connecting Iwakuni Station in Iwakuni and Kushigahama Station in Shūnan. The line was originally built as a more direct route between its termini than the original San'yō Main Line (see History section below). The San'yō Shinkansen more closely follows this line's route than that of the San'yō Main Line between the same two terminal stations.

== Operations ==
Trains operating on this line continue from Kushigahama Station to Tokuyama Station on the San'yō Main Line.

== Stations ==
Station name	Japanese	Distance (km)	Transfers	Location
Iwakuni	岩国	0.0	San'yō Main Line	Iwakuni
Nishi-Iwakuni	西岩国	3.7		Iwakuni
Kawanishi	川西	5.6	■ Nishikigawa Seiryū Line	Iwakuni
Hashirano	柱野	8.5		Iwakuni
Kinmeiji	欽明路	15.2		Iwakuni
Kuga	玖珂	17.1		Iwakuni
Suō-Takamori	周防高森	20.6		Iwakuni
Yonekawa	米川	24.4		Iwakuni
Takamizu	高水	28.8		Shūnan
Katsuma	勝間	31.1		Shūnan
Ōkawachi	大河内	33.3		Shūnan
Suō-Kubo	周防久保	34.7		Kudamatsu
Ikunoya	生野屋	38.0		Kudamatsu
Suō-Hanaoka	周防花岡	39.8		Kudamatsu
Kushigahama	櫛ヶ浜	43.7	■ San'yō Main Line (toward Yanai)	Shūnan
Tokuyama	徳山	47.1	San'yō Shinkansen ■ San'yō Main Line (toward Hōfu and Shin-Yamaguchi)	Shūnan

== Morigahara Junction ==
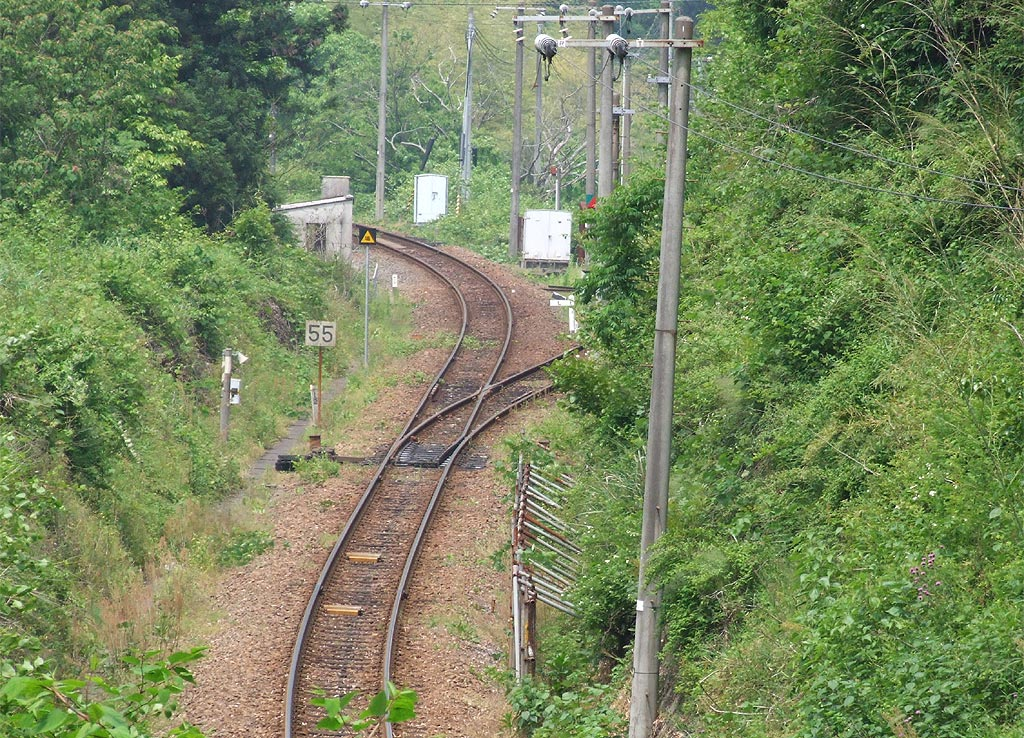
Morigahara Junction

Morigahara Junction (森ヶ原信号場, Morigahara Shingōjō) between Kawanishi and Hashirano Stations is the point where the Nishikigawa Seiryū Line diverges from the Gantoku Line. Between this junction and Kawanishi Station, the two lines share the same track.

== History ==
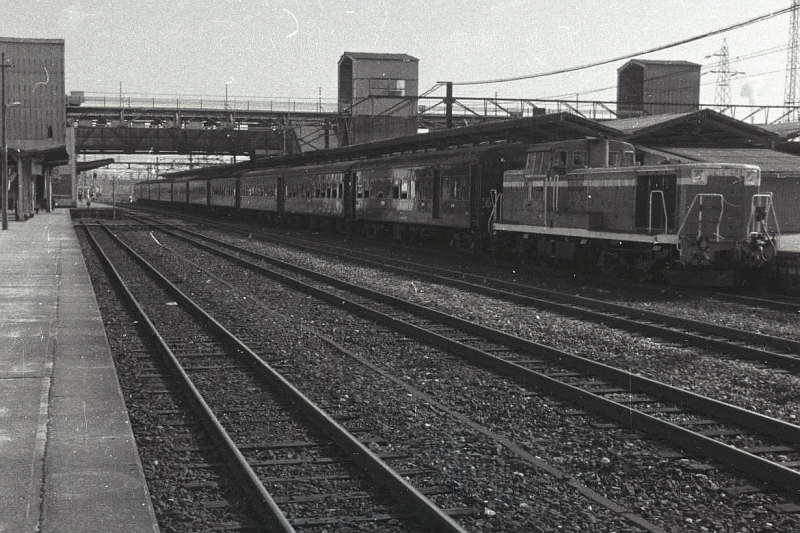
A morning Gantoku Line train at Iwakuni Station, headed by a class DE10 diesel locomotive, circa 1976

The line was originally built to shorten the Sanyo Main Line along the old San'yōdō. The 3.7 km Iwakuni to Marifu (now Nishi-Iwakuni) section opened in 1929, and the 3.9 km Kushigahama to Suo-Hanaoka section opened in 1932. The remaining 36 km section, including the 3,149 m Kinmeiji tunnel (and six others) opened in 1934, at which time the line became part of the Sanyo Main Line, at that time being the only remaining single line section.

In 1944, the original Sanyo alignment via Yanai was double-tracked and reinstated as the Sanyo Main Line, at which time this line became formally known as the Gantoku Line.

Freight services ceased in 1974, and CTC signalling was commissioned on the entire line in 1982.
