= Suō-Hanaoka Station =

Railway station in Kudamatsu, Yamaguchi Prefecture, Japan

Suō-Hanaoka Station 周防花岡駅
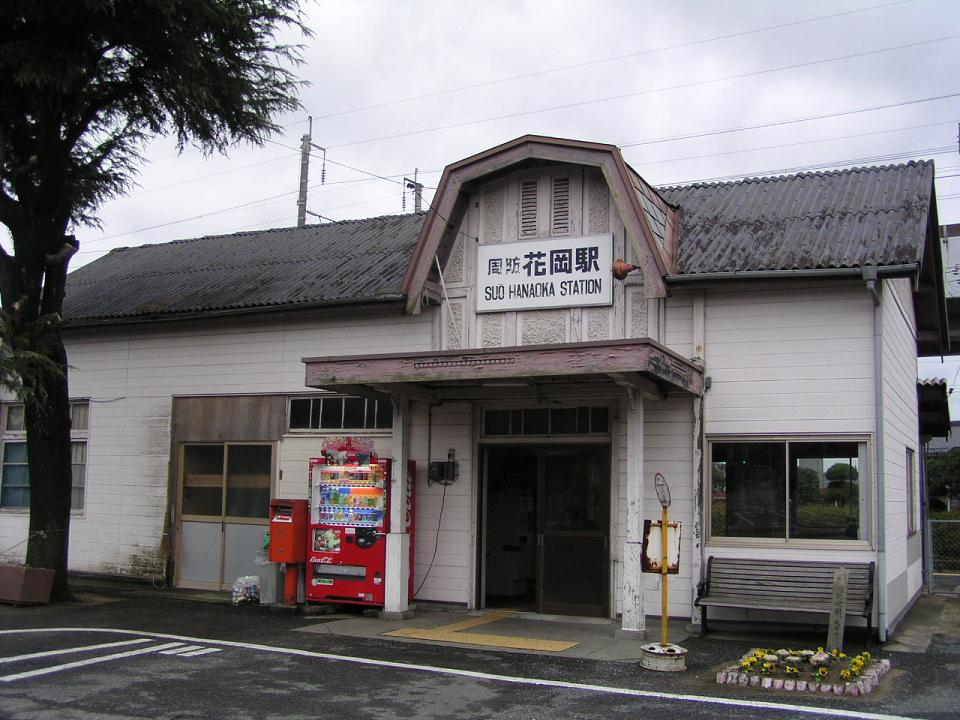
- Suō-Hanaoka Station in January 2008

General information
- Location: 2-chōme-1 Minamihanaoka, Kudamatsu-shi, Yamaguchi-ken 744-0027; Japan
- Coordinates: 34°2′9.66″N 131°52′2.91″E
- Owner: West Japan Railway Company
- Operator: West Japan Railway Company
- Line: Gantoku Line
- Distance: 39.8 km (24.7 miles) from Iwakuni
- Platforms: 1 side platform
- Tracks: 1
- Connections: Bus stop

Construction
- Accessible: Yes

Other information
- Status: Unstaffed
- Website: Official website

History
- Opened: 29 May 1932; 94 years ago

Passengers
- FY2020: 284

Services
Preceding station	JR West	Following station
Kushigahama Terminus	Gantoku Line Local	Ikunoya towards Iwakuni
Location
- Location within Yamaguchi Prefecture Location within Japan

Suō-Hanaoka Station (周防花岡駅, Suō-Hanaoka-eki) is a passenger railway station located in the city of Kudamatsu, Yamaguchi Prefecture, Japan. It is operated by the West Japan Railway Company (JR West).

== Lines ==
Suō-Hanaoka Station is served by the JR West Gantoku Line, and is located 39.8 kilometers from the terminus of the line at Iwakuni.

== Station layout ==
The station consists of one side platform serving a single bi-directional track. The station is unattended.

== History ==
Suō-Hanaoka Station was opened on 29 May 1932, in what was then Hanaoka Village. With the privatization of the Japan National Railway (JNR) on 1 April 1987, the station came under the aegis of the West Japan railway Company (JR West).

== Passenger statistics ==
In fiscal 2020, the station was used by an average of 284 passengers daily.

== Surrounding area ==
- Japan National Route 2
- Yamaguchi Prefectural Karyo High School
- Kudamatsu Municipal Suetake Junior High School

== See also ==
- List of railway stations in Japan
