= Kudamatsu =

Kudamatsu 下松市
- City
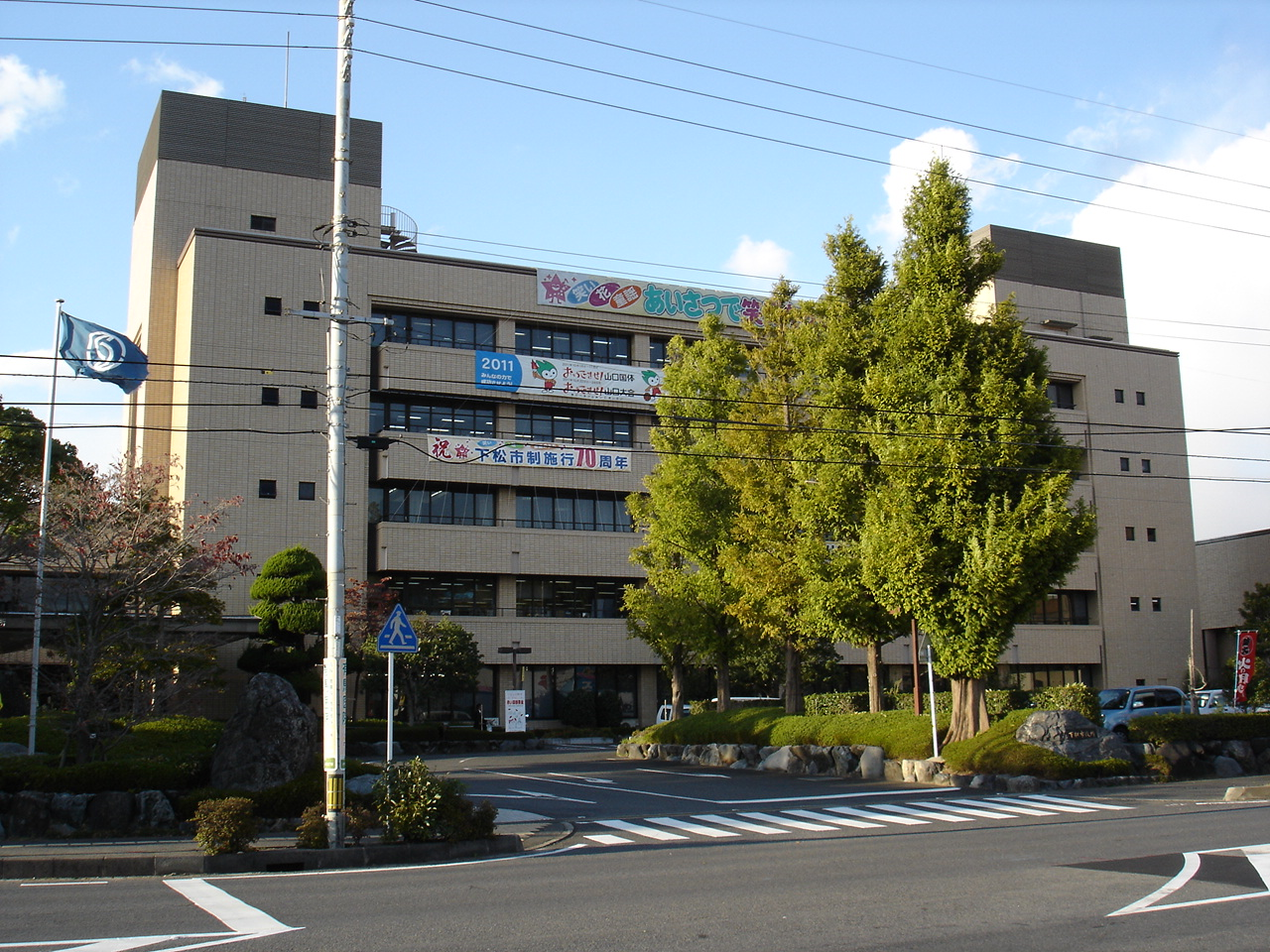
- Kudamatsu City Hall

- Flag Emblem
- Interactive map of Kudamatsu
- Location in Japan
- Coordinates: 34°00′54″N 131°52′13″E
- Country: Japan
- Region: Chūgoku (Sanyo)
- Prefecture: Yamaguchi

Government
  - Mayor: Masuo Kunii

Area
  - Total: 89.35 km^{2} (34.50 sq mi)

Population (May 31, 2014)
  - Total: 56,892
  - Density: 636.7/km^{2} (1,649/sq mi)
- Time zone: UTC+09:00 (JST)
- City hall address: 3-3-3 Ōtemachi, Kudamatsu-shi, Yamaguchi-ken 744-8585
- Climate: Cfa
- Website: Official website
- Symbols
- Flower: Salvia splendens
- Tree: Myrica rubra

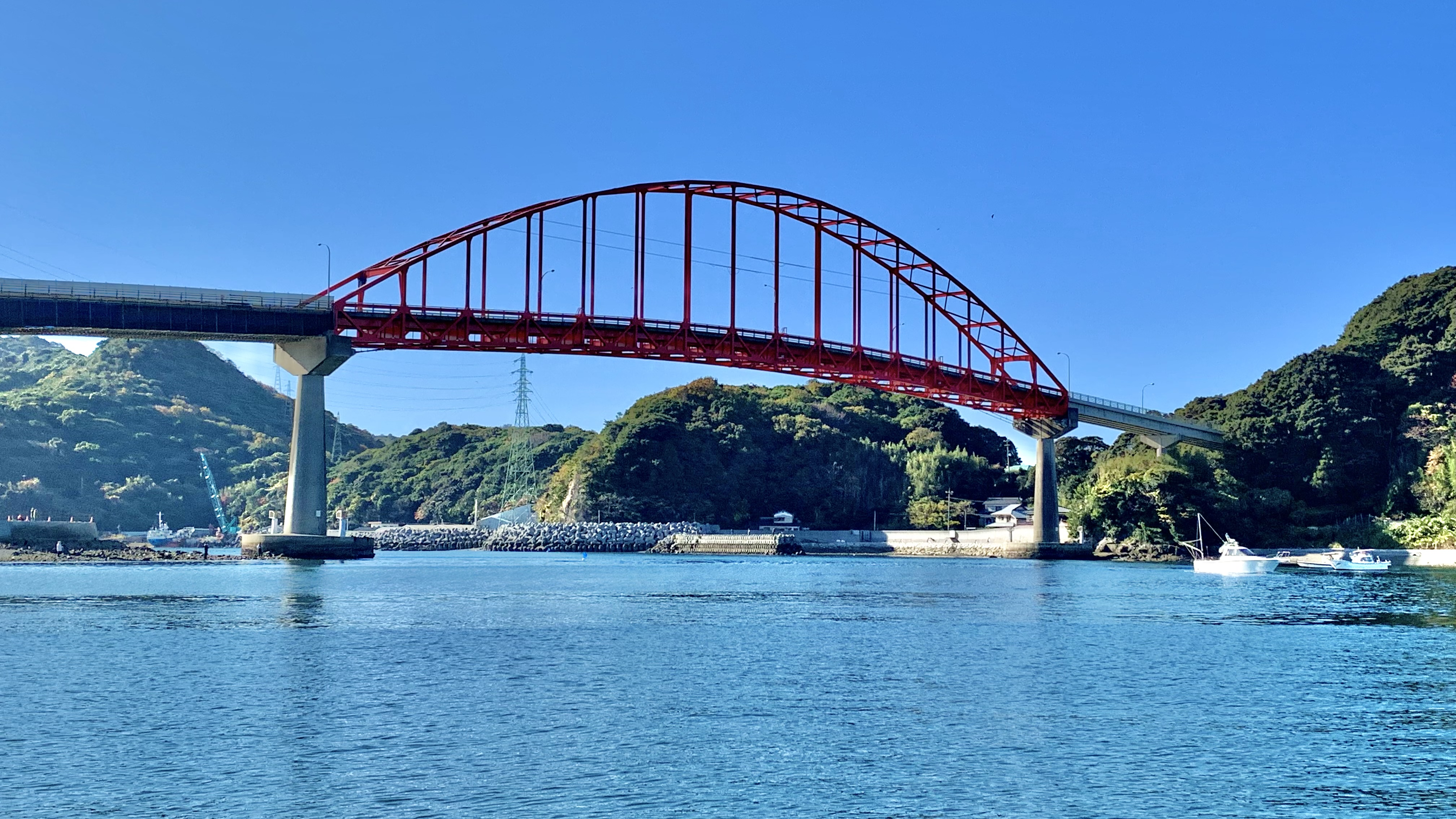
Kasado Bridge

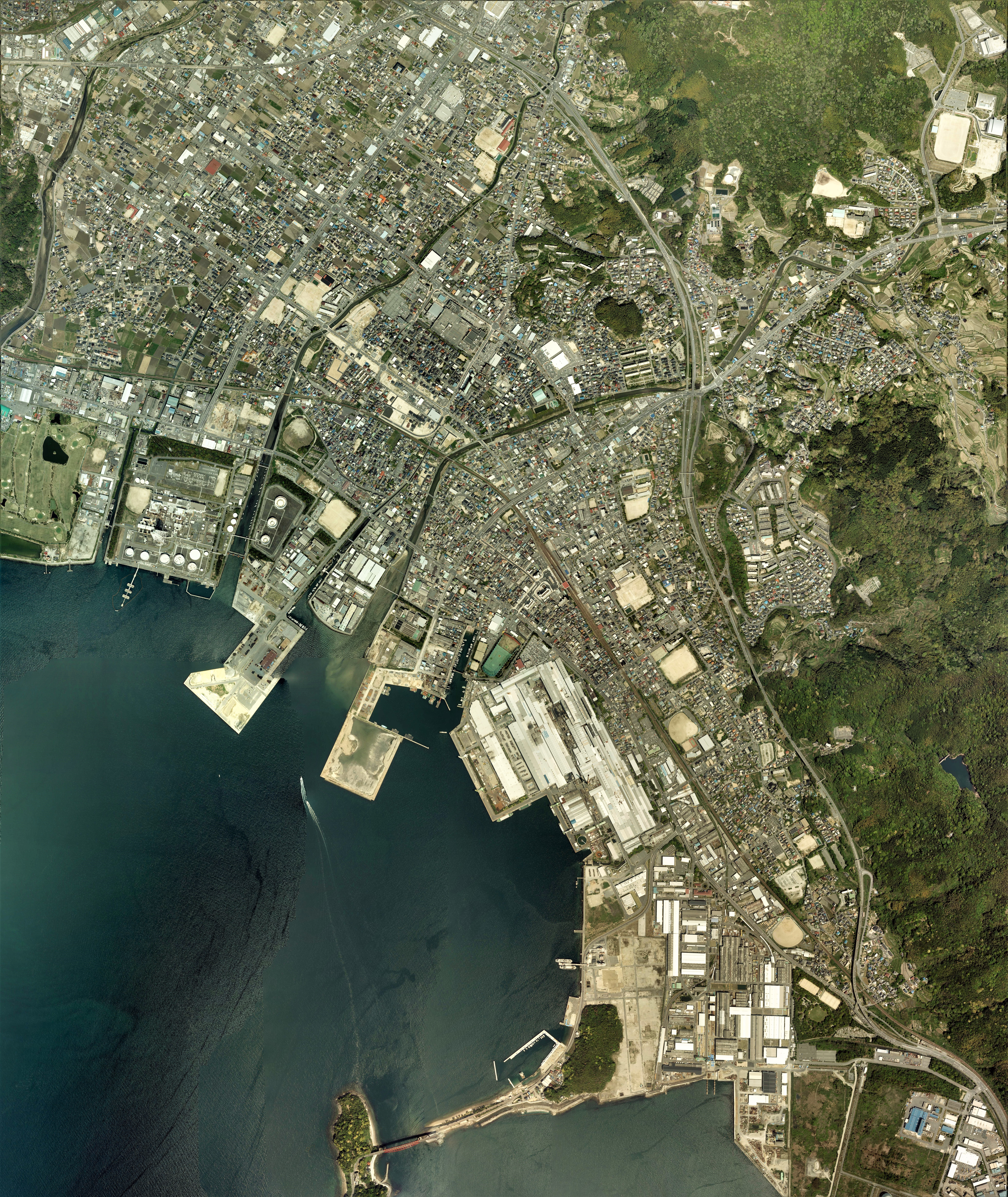
Kudamatsu city center

Kudamatsu (下松市, Kudamatsu-shi) is a city in Yamaguchi Prefecture, Japan. As of 31 May 2023, the city had an estimated population of 56,892 in 26829 households and a population density of 640 persons per km². The total area of the city is 89.35 square kilometres (34.50 sq mi).

== Geography ==
Kudamatsu is sandwiched between the cities of Shunan and Hikari, with which it has strong ties in terms of industry, economy, and population exchange; the three cities are informally called the "Shunan District". The city includes the islands of Kasado and Furushima offshore. In the south, facing the Seto Inland Sea, is the main industrial area and port.The northern area is increasingly a suburban residential area.

=== Neighbouring municipalities ===
Yamaguchi Prefecture

- Hikari
- Shūnan

=== Climate ===
Kudamatsu has a humid subtropical climate (Köppen climate classification Cfa) with hot summers and cool winters. Precipitation is significant throughout the year, but is much higher in summer than in winter. The average annual temperature in Kudamatsu is 15.6 °C (60.1 °F). The average annual rainfall is 1,850.1 mm (72.84 in) with July as the wettest month. The temperatures are highest on average in August, at around 27.0 °C (80.6 °F), and lowest in January, at around 4.9 °C (40.8 °F). The highest temperature ever recorded in Kudamatsu was 37.5 °C (99.5 °F) on 6 August 2026; the coldest temperature ever recorded was −8.6 °C (16.5 °F) on 27 February 1981.

Climate data for Kudamatsu (1991−2020 normals, extremes 1977−present)
Month	Jan	Feb	Mar	Apr	May	Jun	Jul	Aug	Sep	Oct	Nov	Dec	Year
Record high °C (°F)	17.9 (64.2)	21.3 (70.3)	24.4 (75.9)	27.4 (81.3)	30.9 (87.6)	33.2 (91.8)	36.6 (97.9)	37.5 (99.5)	35.9 (96.6)	31.5 (88.7)	28.0 (82.4)	21.9 (71.4)	37.5 (99.5)
Mean daily maximum °C (°F)	9.4 (48.9)	10.4 (50.7)	13.9 (57.0)	19.2 (66.6)	23.6 (74.5)	26.3 (79.3)	30.2 (86.4)	31.8 (89.2)	28.3 (82.9)	23.2 (73.8)	17.5 (63.5)	11.8 (53.2)	20.5 (68.8)
Daily mean °C (°F)	4.9 (40.8)	5.5 (41.9)	8.7 (47.7)	13.7 (56.7)	18.3 (64.9)	21.8 (71.2)	25.8 (78.4)	27.0 (80.6)	23.5 (74.3)	18.0 (64.4)	12.4 (54.3)	7.1 (44.8)	15.6 (60.0)
Mean daily minimum °C (°F)	0.6 (33.1)	0.9 (33.6)	3.7 (38.7)	8.5 (47.3)	13.4 (56.1)	18.2 (64.8)	22.5 (72.5)	23.4 (74.1)	19.6 (67.3)	13.6 (56.5)	7.8 (46.0)	2.7 (36.9)	11.2 (52.2)
Record low °C (°F)	−6.3 (20.7)	−8.6 (16.5)	−5.1 (22.8)	−1.4 (29.5)	4.7 (40.5)	8.5 (47.3)	15.9 (60.6)	15.9 (60.6)	7.4 (45.3)	1.9 (35.4)	−1.4 (29.5)	−5.2 (22.6)	−8.6 (16.5)
Average precipitation mm (inches)	54.3 (2.14)	85.2 (3.35)	148.5 (5.85)	183.7 (7.23)	215.6 (8.49)	277.7 (10.93)	324.7 (12.78)	153.8 (6.06)	169.2 (6.66)	100.6 (3.96)	77.7 (3.06)	59.3 (2.33)	1,850.1 (72.84)
Average precipitation days (≥ 1.0 mm)	6.5	7.9	10.0	9.9	9.7	12.0	10.8	8.4	9.0	6.4	6.9	7.0	104.5
Mean monthly sunshine hours	148.9	150.8	183.8	199.4	217.7	156.4	181.3	222.0	173.6	184.0	163.2	154.2	2,135.5
Source: Japan Meteorological Agency

=== Demographics ===
Per Japanese census data, the population of Kudamatsu in 2020 is 55,887 people. Kudamatsu has been conducting censuses since 1920.

Historical population

Year	Pop.	±%
1920	23,344	—
1925	24,195	+3.6%
1930	26,581	+9.9%
1935	30,341	+14.1%
1940	35,247	+16.2%
1945	40,810	+15.8%
1950	42,228	+3.5%

Year	Pop.	±%
1955	43,397	+2.8%
1960	44,711	+3.0%
1965	47,401	+6.0%
1970	49,627	+4.7%
1975	55,825	+12.5%
1980	54,803	−1.8%
1985	54,445	−0.7%

Year	Pop.	±%
1990	53,030	−2.6%
1995	53,471	+0.8%
2000	53,101	−0.7%
2005	53,509	+0.8%
2010	55,020	+2.8%
2015	55,812	+1.4%
2020	55,887	+0.1%

Kudamatsu population statistics

== History ==
The area of Kudamatsu was part of an ancient Suō Province.

The fallen star legend associated with the arrival of Prince Imseong from Baekje, the reputed ancestor of the Ōuchi clan, is central to the history of Kudamatsu (下松). The city's name is associated with the legendary pine tree where the star is said to have fallen and the legend is featured prominently in the city's tourism material. The legend is also commemorated in the city's Star Tower (Hoshi no Tō) in Kudamatsu Park. The legend of Prince Imseong's arrival is retold during local festivals and events, reinforcing the city's heritage.

Myōkengu Juto-ji Temple (妙見宮鷲頭寺), located in Kudamatsu, is said to have been established by Prince Imseong in the 7th century after his arrival and became the birthplace of the worship of the deity Myōken Daibosatsu (妙見大菩薩). Under the patronage of the Ōuchi clan, it flourished as the home of the clan's guardian deity.

During the Edo Period, the area was part of the holdings of Chōshū Domain and Tokuyama Domain. Following the Meiji restoration, the village of Toyoi (豊井村) within Tsuno District, Yamaguchi was established with the creation of the modern municipalities system on April 1, 1889. Toyoi as elevated to town status on March 1, 1901 and renamed Kudamatsu. On November 3, 1939 Kudamatsu annexed the villages of Hanaoka, Kubo and Suetake-minami and was elevated to city status.

== Government ==
Kudamatsu has a mayor-council form of government with a directly elected mayor and a unicameral city council of 20 members. Kudamatsu contributes two members to the Yamaguchi Prefectural Assembly. In terms of national politics, the city is part of the Yamaguchi 2nd district of the lower house of the Diet of Japan.

== Economy ==
Kudamatsu is part of the Shunan industrial complex (a part of the Setouchi industrial area) that spreads across the Tokuyama-Kudamatsu Port area. It has multiple large-scale factories, notably the Hitachi, Ltd. Kasado Works which produces domestic and overseas railway vehicles and Toyo Kohan, which produces materials for beverage cans and hard disk substrates.

== Education ==
Kudamatsu has seven public elementary school and three public junior high schools operated by the city government, and three public high schools operated by the Yamaguchi Prefectural Board of Education.

== Transportation ==
=== Railway ===
JR West (JR West) - San'yō Main Line

- Kudamatsu

JR West (JR West) - Gantoku Line

- Suō-Kubo - Ikunoya - Suō-Hanaoka

=== Highways ===
- San'yō Expressway
- National Route 2
- National Route 188
