= Shin-Iwakuni Station =

Railway station in Iwakuni, Yamaguchi Prefecture, Japan

Shin-Iwakuni Station 新岩国駅
- Shin-Iwakuni Station

Japanese name
- Shinjitai: 新岩国駅
- Kyūjitai: 新岩國驛
- Hiragana: しんいわくにえき

General information
- Location: 1055-1 Mishō, Iwakuni City; Yamaguchi Prefecture; Japan
- Coordinates: 34°09′54″N 132°08′59″E
- Operator: JR West
- Line: San'yō Shinkansen
- Platforms: 1 island platform and 1 side platform
- Connections: Bus stop

Construction
- Structure type: Elevated

History
- Opened: 10 March 1975; 51 years ago

Services
Preceding station	JR West	Following station
Tokuyama towards Hakata	San'yō Shinkansen Hikari	Hiroshima towards Shin-Ōsaka
Tokuyama towards Hakata or Hakataminami	San'yō Shinkansen Kodama	Hiroshima towards Shin-Ōsaka
Location
- Location within Yamaguchi Prefecture Location within Japan

Shin-Iwakuni Station (Japanese: 新岩国駅, Hepburn: Shin-Iwakuni-eki; lit. 'New Iwakuni Station') is a railway station on the high-speed Sanyo Shinkansen line in Iwakuni, Yamaguchi, Japan, operated by West Japan Railway Company (JR West).

== Lines ==
Shin-Iwakuni Station is served by the high-speed Sanyo Shinkansen line.

It is linked by a walkway to the Seiryū-Shin-Iwakuni Station on the Nishikigawa Seiryū Line.

== Platforms ==
The Shinkansen Platform consists of 1 island platform and 2 side platforms totalling 3 tracks. There are also 2 tracks in the centre for passing trains.

1, 2	■ San'yō Shinkansen	for Hiroshima, Okayama and Shin-Osaka
3	■ San'yō Shinkansen	for Shin-Yamaguchi and Hakata

== History ==
Shin-Iwakuni Station opened on 10 March 1975, coinciding with the opening of the Sanyo Shinkansen extension west of Okayama to Hakata. With the privatization of JNR on 1 April 1987, the station came under the control of JR West.
