= Kuga Station =

Railway station in Iwakuni, Yamaguchi Prefecture, Japan

Kuga Station 玖珂駅
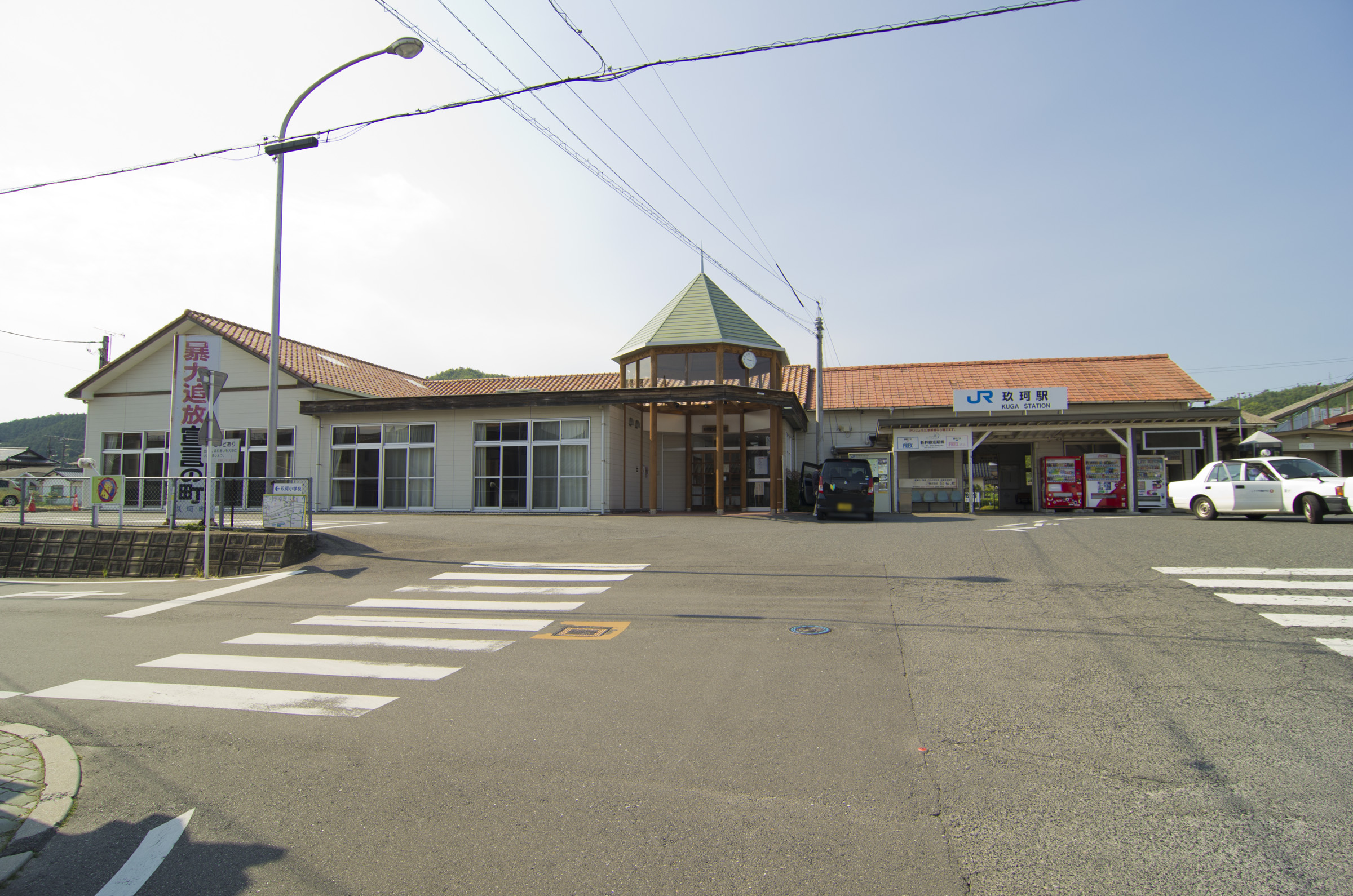
- Kuga Station in May 2012

General information
- Location: 581-3 Kugamachi, Iwakuni-shi, Yamaguchi-ken 742-0344; Japan
- Coordinates: 34°5′49.47″N 132°4′55.83″E
- Owner: West Japan Railway Company
- Operator: West Japan Railway Company
- Line: Gantoku Line
- Distance: 17.1 km (10.6 miles) from Iwakuni
- Platforms: 1 side platform
- Tracks: 1
- Connections: Bus stop

Other information
- Status: Staffed
- Website: Official website

History
- Opened: 1 December 1934; 91 years ago

Passengers
- FY2020: 318

Services
Preceding station	JR West	Following station
Suō-Takamori towards Kushigahama	Gantoku Line Local	Kimmeiji towards Iwakuni
Location
- Location within Yamaguchi Prefecture Location within Japan

Kuga Station (玖珂駅, Kuga-eki) is a passenger railway station located in the city of Iwakuni, Yamaguchi Prefecture, Japan. It is operated by the West Japan Railway Company (JR West). It is located in central Kuga.

== Lines ==
Kuga Station is served by the JR West Gantoku Line, and is located 17.1 kilometers from the terminus of the line at Iwakuni.

== Station layout ==
The station consists of one side platform serving a single bi-directional track. The station is staffed.

== History ==
Kuga Station was opened on 1 December 1934. With the privatization of the Japan National Railway (JNR) on 1 April 1987, the station came under the aegis of the West Japan railway Company (JR West).

== Passenger statistics ==
In fiscal 2020, the station was used by an average of 318 passengers daily.

== Surrounding area ==
- Iwakuni City Kuga Branch
- Iwakuni City Kuga Junior High School
- Iwakuni City Kuga Elementary School
- Japan National Route 2

== See also ==
- List of railway stations in Japan
