= Tokuyama Station =

Railway station in Shūnan, Yamaguchi Prefecture, Japan

Tokuyama Station 徳山駅
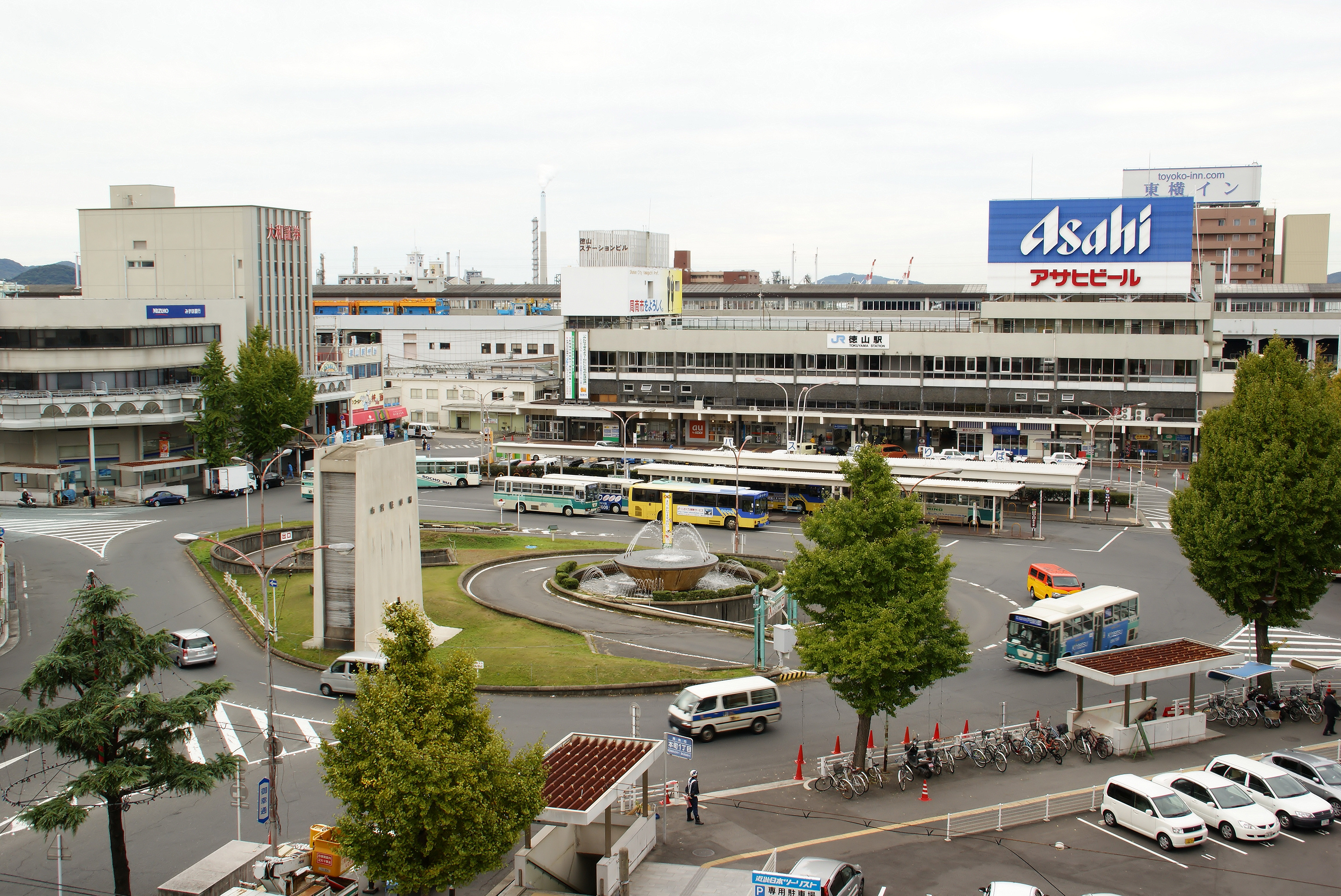
- Station building with large sign of Asahi Breweries

Japanese name
- Shinjitai: 徳山駅
- Kyūjitai: 德山驛
- Hiragana: とくやまえき

General information
- Location: 2-28 Miyukidōri, Shūnan-shi, Yamaguchi-ken 745-0034; Japan
- Coordinates: 34°03′05″N 131°48′09″E
- Operator: JR West
- Lines: San'yō Shinkansen; San'yō Line; Gantoku Line
- Platforms: 2 side platforms (Shinknasen); 1 island platform and 1 side platform (conventional line)
- Tracks: 5 (2 Shinkansen, 3 conventional lines)

Construction
- Structure type: Elevated (Shinkansen), At grade (conventional line)

Other information
- Website: Official website

History
- Opened: 25 September 1897; 129 years ago

Passengers
- FY2022: 6270

Services
Preceding station	JR West	Following station
Shin-Yamaguchi towards Hakata	San'yō Shinkansen Sakura	Hiroshima towards Shin-Ōsaka
Shin-Yamaguchi towards Hakata	San'yō Shinkansen Nozomi	Hiroshima towards Shin-Ōsaka
Shin-Yamaguchi towards Hakata	San'yō Shinkansen Hikari	Shin-Iwakuni towards Shin-Ōsaka
Shin-Yamaguchi towards Hakata or Hakataminami	San'yō Shinkansen Kodama	Shin-Iwakuni towards Shin-Ōsaka
Location
- Location within Yamaguchi Prefecture Location within Japan

Tokuyama Station (徳山駅, Tokuyama-eki) is a passenger railway station located in the city of Shūnan, Yamaguchi, Japan. It is operated by JR West. It is located in central Shūnan, with the Tokuyama Port and the city office within walking distance.

== Lines ==
Tokuyama Station is served by the San'yō Shinkansen and is 430.1 kilometers from Shin-Osaka and 982.7 km from Tokyo. It is also served San'yō Main Line, and is located 414.9 kilometers from the terminus of the line at Kobe and is the western terminus of the 47.1 kilometer Gantoku Line to Iwakuni.

== Station layout ==
The San'yō Shinkansen has two elevated opposed side platforms on the outer edge, with two tracks in the middle for through trains on the third floor of the station building. Station facilities are located on the second floor, and the conventional lines have two side platforms and one island platform with a cutout, serving a total of six tracks on the ground level. The station has a Midori no Madoguchi staffed ticket office.

=== Platforms ===
1	Sanyō Main Line	for Yanai, Iwakuni, Hiroshima
3	Gantoku Line	for Suō-Takamori, Kuga, Iwakuni
3	Sanyō Main Line (sometimes used)	for Yanai, Iwakuni, Hiroshima for Hōfu, Shin-Yamaguchi, Shimonoseki
4	Sanyō Main Line	for Hōfu, Shin-Yamaguchi, Shimonoseki
5	Sanyō Main Line	for Hōfu, Shin-Yamaguchi, Shimonoseki
6	Sanyō Shinkansen	for Hiroshima, Shin-Ōsaka, Tokyo
7	Sanyō Shinkansen	for Kokura, Hakata, Kumamoto, Kagoshima-Chūō

== History ==
- September 25, 1897: Station opens as the San'yō Railway extends its route past Hiroshima Station.
- December 1, 1906: Station is transferred to Japanese National Railways as a part of railway nationalization.
- December 1, 1934: Gantoku Line begins operation.
- September, 1969: Present station building begins to be used.
- March 10, 1975: The San'yō Shinkansen stops here for the first time.
- April 1, 1987: Station operation is taken over by JR West after privatization of Japanese National Railways.
- September 6, 2014: New station building for conventional lines is in use.
- December 12, 2020: The West Express Ginga starts stopping at the station.

== Passenger statistics ==
In fiscal 2022, the station was used by an average of 6270 passengers daily.

== Surrounding area ==
- Shunan City Hall
- Shunan City Central Library
- Shunan City Art Museum
- Shunan City Tokuyama Zoo

== Famous Ekiben ==
- Anago-meshi - kabayaki eel over rice

== See also ==
- List of railway stations in Japan
