= Kushigahama Station =

Railway station in Shūnan, Yamaguchi Prefecture, Japan

Kushigahama Station 櫛ヶ浜駅
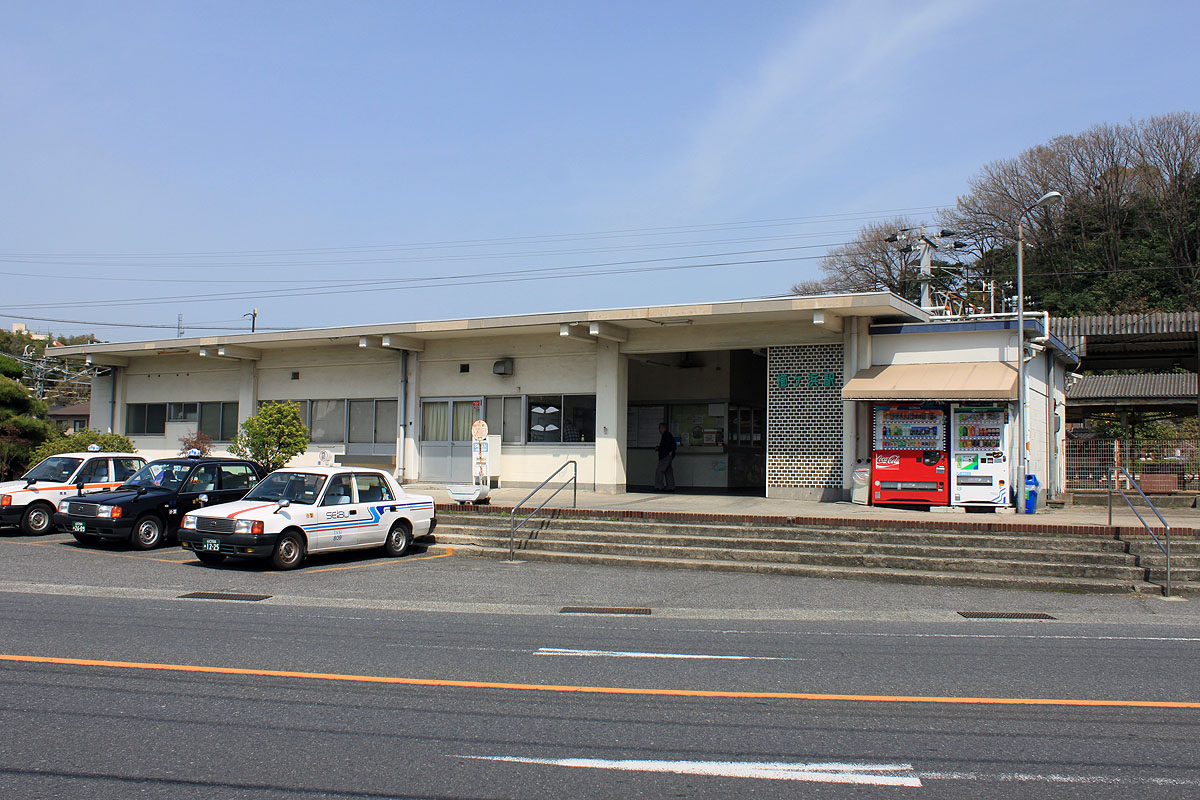
- Kushigahama Station in March 2010

General information
- Location: 3975-1 Kume Innai, Shūnan-shi, Yamaguchi-ken 745-0801; Japan
- Coordinates: 34°1′52.33″N 131°49′43.23″E
- Owner: West Japan Railway Company
- Operator: West Japan Railway Company
- Lines: San'yō Line; Gantoku Line
- Distance: 411.5 km (255.7 miles) from Kobe
- Platforms: 1 side + 2 island platforms
- Tracks: 4
- Connections: Bus stop

Construction
- Accessible: Yes

Other information
- Status: Unstaffed
- Website: Official website

History
- Opened: 11 February 1929; 97 years ago

Passengers
- FY2022: 850

Services
Preceding station	JR West	Following station
Terminus	Gantoku Line	Suō-Hanaoka towards Iwakuni
Tokuyama towards Shimonoseki	San'yō Line Local	Kudamatsu towards Iwakuni
Location
- Location within Yamaguchi Prefecture Location within Japan

Kushigahama Station (櫛ヶ浜駅, Kushigahama-eki) is a junction passenger railway station located in the Tokuyama area of the city of Shūnan, Yamaguchi Prefecture, Japan. It is operated by the West Japan Railway Company (JR West).

== Lines ==
Kushigahama Station is served by the JR West Sanyō Main Line, and is located 411.5 kilometers from the terminus of the line at Kobe. It is also served by the Gantoku Line and is 43.7 kilometers from the terminus of that station at Iwakuni.

== Station layout ==
The station consists of one side platform and two island platforms connected by a footbridge. There is an unnumbered fifth track that looks like a siding track on the inbound platform, but is used only for maintenance purposes and is a dead end. The station is unattended.

== Platforms ==
1	■ San'yō Line	for Tokuyama and Hōfu
2	■ San'yō Line	for Yanai and Iwakuni
3	■ Gantoku Line	for Tokuyama
4	■ Gantoku Line	for Suō-Takamori and Kuga

== History ==
Kushigahama Station was opened on 11 February 1929 as an infill station on the San'yo Main Line. The Gantoku Line began operations from 29 May 1932. With the privatization of the Japan National Railway (JNR) on 1 April 1987, the station came under the aegis of the West Japan railway Company (JR West).

== Passenger statistics ==
In fiscal 2022, the station was used by an average of 850 passengers daily.

== Surrounding area ==
- Tokuyama Boat Race Course
- Shunan City Athletic Stadium
- Shunan City Kushihama Elementary School
- Shunan Municipal Taika Junior High School

== See also ==
- List of railway stations in Japan
