= Iwakuni Station =

Railway station in Iwakuni, Yamaguchi Prefecture, Japan

Iwakuni Station 岩国駅
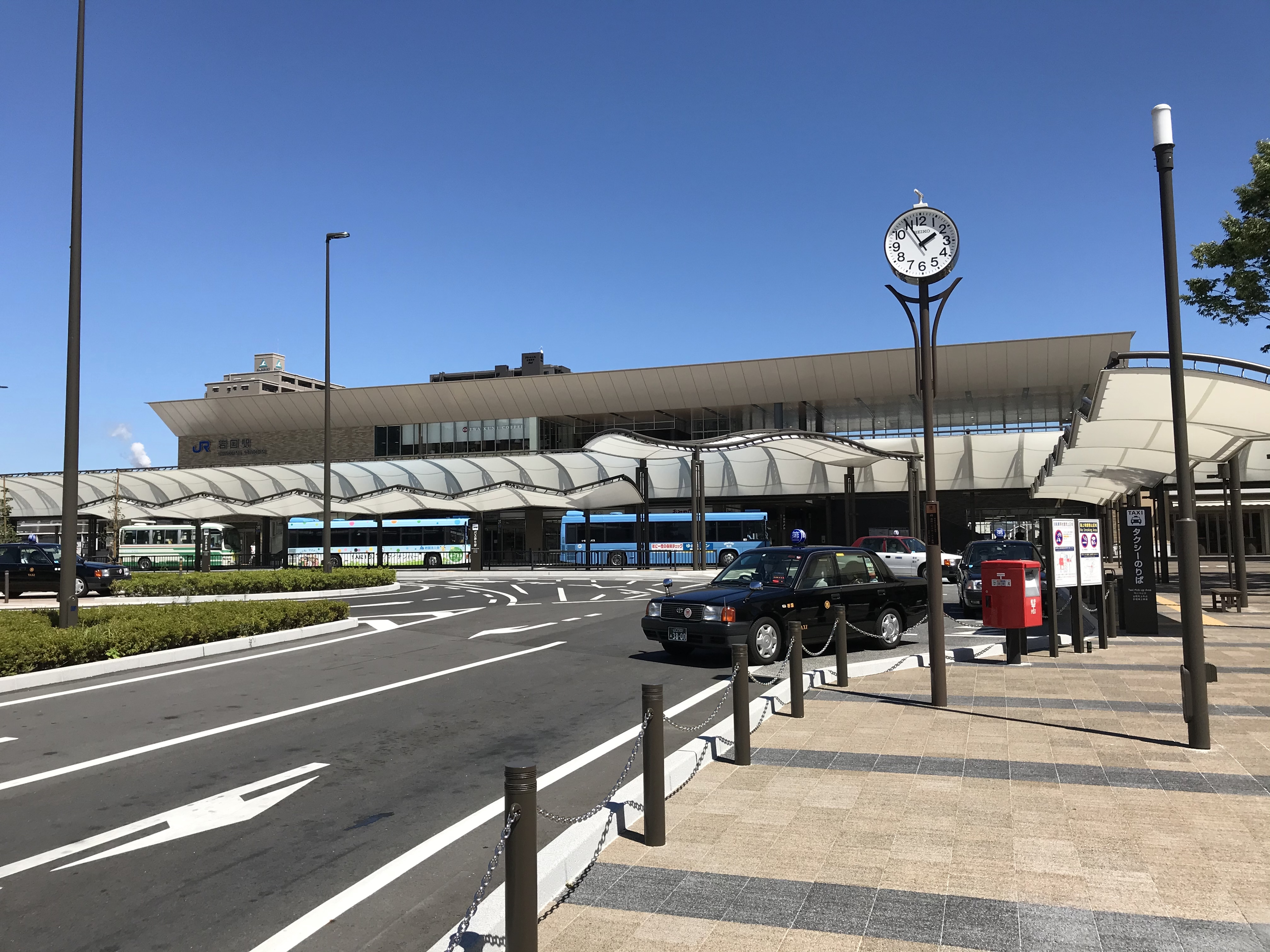
- Iwakuni Station west entrance building in August 2020

General information
- Location: 1-1, Marifu-machi 1-chōme, Iwakuni-shi, Yamaguchi-ken 740-0018; Japan
- Coordinates: 34°10′18.69″N 132°13′32.3″E
- Owner: West Japan Railway Company
- Operator: West Japan Railway Company
- Lines: R Sanyō Main Line; Gantoku Line
- Distance: 346.1 km (215.1 miles) from Kobe
- Platforms: 1 side + 2 island platforms
- Tracks: 6
- Connections: Bus stop

Construction
- Structure type: Elevated
- Accessible: Yes

Other information
- Status: Staffed ( Midori no Madoguchi )
- Station code: JR-R16
- Website: Official website

History
- Opened: 25 September 1897; 129 years ago
- Former names: Marifu (1929-1942)

Passengers
- FY2022: 4689

Services
| Preceding station | JR West | Following station |
|---|---|---|
| Nishi-Iwakuni towards Kushigahama | Gantoku Line | Terminus |
| Terminus | San'yō Line City Liner | Waki towards Hiroshima |
| Terminus | San'yō Line Rapid | Ōtake towards Hiroshima |
| through to San'yō Main Line towards Tokuyama | San'yō Line Local | Waki towards Hiroshima |
| Minami-Iwakuni towards Shimonoseki | San'yō Line Local | through to San'yō Line R towards Hiroshima |
| Yanai One-way operation | San'yō Line For Osaka West Express Ginga | Miyajimaguchi towards Osaka |
| Tokuyama towards Shimonoseki | San'yō Line For Shimonoseki West Express Ginga | Miyajimaguchi towards Osaka |
Location
- Location within Yamaguchi Prefecture Location within Japan

Iwakuni Station (岩国駅, Iwakuni-eki) is a junction passenger railway station located in the city of Iwakuni, Yamaguchi Prefecture, Japan. It is operated by the West Japan Railway Company (JR West).

== Lines ==
Iwakuni Station is served by the JR West Sanyō Main Line, and is located 346.1 kilometers from the terminus of the line at Kobe. It is also the terminus of the 43.7 kilometer Gantoku Line to Tokuyama. Additionally, trains from the Nishikigawa Seiryū Line inter-run over the Gantoku Line and terminate at Iwakuni.

== Station layout ==
The station consists of three platforms and six tracks, connected by an elevated station building. Platform 1 is a side platform facing the west exit, and Platform 0 is a notched platform on the Shimonoseki side of Platform 1. Platforms 3 and 4, and Platforms 6 and 7 each have island platforms. The station has a Midori no Madoguchi staffed ticket office.

== Platforms ==
| 0 | ■ Nishikigawa Seiryū Line | for Nishikicho |
| 1 | ■ Gantoku Line | for Kuga and Tokuyama |
| 3, 4, 6 | ■ R Sanyō Main Line | for Miyajimaguchi and Hiroshima |
| 6, 7 | ■ San'yō Line | for Yanai and Tokuyama |

== History ==
Iwakuni Station was opened on 25 September 1897 as a station on the San'yo Railway with the extension of the line from Hiroshima to Tokuyama. The San'yo Railway was nationalized in 1906 and the line renamed the San'yo Main Line in 1909. The station name was changed to Marifu Station (麻里布駅) on 2 February 1929, but reverted to its original name on 1 April 1942. With the privatization of the Japanese National Railways (JNR) on 1 April 1987, the station came under the aegis of the West Japan railway Company (JR West).

== Passenger statistics ==
In fiscal 2022, the station was used by an average of 4689 passengers daily.

== Surrounding area ==
The west side of the station is a commercial area, and the east side of the station is an urban and industrial area. Iwakuni Port is located to the north of the station, and Iwakuni Airfield (Iwakuni Kintaikyo Airport) is located to the south of the station, both of which are about 2.5 km away from the station. Public facilities such as the Iwakuni City Hall are located about 1 kilometer away from the station.

== See also ==
- List of railway stations in Japan
- Shin-Iwakuni Station
