= List of dams in Yamaguchi Prefecture =

The following is a list of dams in Yamaguchi Prefecture, Japan.

== List ==
Name	Location	Started	Opened	Height	Length	Image	DiJ number
Abugawa Dam		1966	1974	95 m (312 ft)	286 m (938 ft)		2081
Agari Tameike Dam			1886	15 m (49 ft)	56 m (184 ft)		2007
Akiyama Tameike Dam			1944	16 m (52 ft)	101 m (331 ft)		2013
Aratani Dam		1976	1987	56 m (184 ft)	160 m (520 ft)		2103
Arimune Dam		1980	1990	28.7 m (94 ft)	121.5 m (399 ft)		2105
Asinodani Tameike Dam			1988	20.1 m (66 ft)	141 m (463 ft)		3567
Aso Dam		1993	2002	44.2 m (145 ft)	134 m (440 ft)		3215
Biwanoki-ike Dam			1962	17.1 m (56 ft)	63.5 m (208 ft)		3571
Daibo Dam		1969	1973	43.5 m (143 ft)	115 m (377 ft)		2080
Ekiyama No.1 Tameike Dam			1919	22.7 m (74 ft)	72 m (236 ft)		2027
Fukutani Tameike Dam			1926	16.8 m (55 ft)	75 m (246 ft)		3572
Funagori Dam		1989	2002	28 m (92 ft)	221 m (725 ft)		3047
Hata Dam			1971	21 m (69 ft)	140 m (460 ft)		2079
Hatano-ike Dam			2006	18 m (59 ft)	63 m (207 ft)		2045
Hirase Dam		1973		73 m (240 ft)	300 m (980 ft)		2098
Ichinosaka Dam		1971	1983	42.1 m (138 ft)	143.5 m (471 ft)		2089
Ichinotani-ike Dam		1921	1954	15 m (49 ft)	70 m (230 ft)		3566
Ikimigawa Dam		1969	1984	90 m (300 ft)	215 m (705 ft)		2091
Ikumo Dam			1953	17.5 m (57 ft)	66 m (217 ft)		2065
Imatomi Dam		1971	1978	35.5 m (116 ft)	219 m (719 ft)		2084
Ishii Dam		1972	1992	36.3 m (119 ft)	176.3 m (578 ft)		2097
Karine Dam							
Kawakami Dam		1971	1979	63 m (207 ft)	187.3 m (615 ft)		2085
Kochi Dam			1925	22.6 m (74 ft)	92 m (302 ft)		2077
Kogawachi Dam							
Kotougawa Dam				38.8 m (127 ft)			2064
Kōdō Dam							
Koyagawa Dam							
Kurokui Dam			1939	16.9 m (55 ft)	65 m (213 ft)		2053
Kurokuigawa Dam				35 m (115 ft)			2078
Kurokuigawajoryu Dam		1991	2011	48 m (157 ft)	253 m (830 ft)		3136
Majimegawa Dam		1992	2008	21.9 m (72 ft)	354.5 m (1,163 ft)		3176
Maruyama Dam							
Midoriyama-ike Dam			1932	15 m (49 ft)	65 m (213 ft)		2028
Mine Dam				32 m (105 ft)			2083
Misaka Dam			1923	26.9 m (88 ft)	233 m (764 ft)		2074
Mishima Dam		1992	2001	31 m (102 ft)	300 m (980 ft)		3175
Mishogawa Dam			1958	21.8 m (72 ft)	101.5 m (333 ft)		2069
Mizukoshi Dam			1965	18.8 m (62 ft)	81.7 m (268 ft)		2076
Nakayamagawa Dam		1974	1995	37 m (121 ft)	143 m (469 ft)		2100
Nodo Tameike			1957	22.3 m (73 ft)	204.9 m (672 ft)		2068
Nukumi Dam		1960		36 m (118 ft)			2073
Ohkochigawa Dam		1975		62 m (203 ft)	155 m (509 ft)		2102
Old Katsuragaya Reservoir Dam							
Ozegawa Dam		1958	1964	49 m (161 ft)			2071
Sabagawa Dam				54 m (177 ft)			2067
Sasanamigawa Dam		1956	1959	67.4 m (221 ft)	127.3 m (418 ft)		2070
Shimajigawa Dam		1978	1980	89 m (292 ft)			2086
Showa-ike Dam		1939	1945	17.5 m (57 ft)	84 m (276 ft)		3569
Sugano Dam				87 m (285 ft)			2075
Tamaizumi-ike Dam			1941	19.5 m (64 ft)	100 m (330 ft)		2051
Tatara Dam			1917	17.5 m (57 ft)	60 m (200 ft)		3570
Toro-ike Dam			1988	15.2 m (50 ft)	107 m (351 ft)		2057
Tsuenokochi No.1 Tameike Dam			1907	16.4 m (54 ft)	106 m (348 ft)		2019
Ubakochikami Dam			1918	15 m (49 ft)	40 m (130 ft)		2025
Ushigasako-ike Dam			1914	25.6 m (84 ft)	80 m (260 ft)		2022
Utanokawa Dam		1972	1980	44 m (144 ft)	162 m (531 ft)		2088
Utsui Dam		1975	1990	41.2 m (135 ft)	229 m (751 ft)		2090
Yamaguchi Dam							
Yamanokuchi Dam		1975	1984	40.2 m (132 ft)	103 m (338 ft)		2094
Yasaka Dam		1991	1991	120 m (390 ft)			1996
Yashiro Dam		1972	1990	46.5 m (153 ft)	371.7 m (1,219 ft)		2092
Yumen Dam		1993	2006	46 m (151 ft)	200 m (660 ft)		3214
Yunohara Dam		1972	1990	18.5 m (61 ft)	212.9 m (698 ft)		2093

== See also ==
- Media related to Dams in Yamaguchi prefecture at Wikimedia Commons
