= Kochi Dam =

Kochi Dam may refer to:

- Kochi Dam (Hyōgo)
- Kochi Dam (Mie)
- Kochi Dam (Yamaguchi)
