= Kawakami Dam =

Kawakami Dam may refer to:

- Kawakami Dam (Mie)
- Kawakami Dam (Yamaguchi)
