= Hata Dam =

Hata Dam may refer to:

- Hata Dam (Fukuoka)
- Hata Dam (Yamaguchi)
