= Mishima Dam =

Mishima Dam may refer to:

- Mishima Dam (Chiba)
- Mishima Dam (Yamaguchi)
