= Yashiro Dam =

Yashiro Dam may refer to:

- Yashiro Dam (Ehime)
- Yashiro Dam (Yamaguchi)
