= Ichinotani-ike Dam =

Dam in Yamaguchi Prefecture, Japan

Ichinotani-ike
- Location within Japan
- Interactive map of Ichinotani-ike
- Location: Yamaguchi Prefecture, Japan
- Coordinates: 34°8′18″N 131°56′12″E
- Construction began: 1921
- Opening date: 1954

Dam and spillways
- Height: 15 m (49 ft)
- Length: 70 m (230 ft)

Reservoir
- Total capacity: 60 thousand cubic meters
- Catchment area: 0.6 sq. km
- Surface area: 1 hectares

Ichinotani-ike is an earthfill dam located in Yamaguchi prefecture in Japan. The dam is used for irrigation. The catchment area of the dam is 0.6 km^{2}. The dam impounds about 1 ha of land when full and can store 60 thousand cubic meters of water. The construction of the dam was started on 1921 and completed in 1954.
