= Akiyama Tameike Dam =

Dam in Yamaguchi Prefecture, Japan

- Location within Japan
- Location: Yamaguchi Prefecture, Japan
- Coordinates: 34°4′22″N 131°11′18″E
- Opening date: 1944

Dam and spillways
- Height: 16 m (52 ft)
- Length: 101 m (331 ft)

Reservoir
- Total capacity: 800 thousand cubic meters
- Catchment area: 3 sq. km
- Surface area: 8 hectares

Akiyama Tameike Dam is an earthfill dam located in Yamaguchi prefecture in Japan. The dam is used for irrigation. The catchment area of the dam is 3 km^{2}. The dam impounds about 8 ha of land when full and can store 800 thousand cubic meters of water. The construction of the dam was completed in 1944.
