= Aratani Dam =

Dam in Yamaguchi Prefecture, Japan

- Location within Japan
- Interactive map of Aratani Dam
- Location: Yamaguchi Prefecture, Japan
- Coordinates: 34°14′03″N 131°29′33″E
- Construction began: 1976
- Opening date: 1987

Dam and spillways
- Height: 56 m (184 ft)
- Length: 160 m (520 ft)

Reservoir
- Total capacity: 5200 thousand cubic meters
- Catchment area: 8.1 sq. km
- Surface area: 25 hectares

Aratani Dam is a gravity dam located in Yamaguchi prefecture in Japan. The dam is used for flood control and water supply. The catchment area of the dam is 8.1 km^{2}. The dam impounds about 25 ha of land when full and can store 5200 thousand cubic meters of water. The construction of the dam was started on 1976 and completed in 1987.
