= Hata Dam (Fukuoka) =

Dam in Fukuoka Prefecture, Japan

- Location within Japan
- Interactive map of Hata Dam
- Location: Fukuoka Prefecture, Japan
- Coordinates: 33°48′16″N 130°45′27″E
- Construction began: 1939
- Opening date: 1955

Dam and spillways
- Height: 43.3 m (142 ft)
- Length: 458.8 m (1,505 ft)

Reservoir
- Total capacity: 7349 thousand cubic meters
- Catchment area: 10.7 sq. km
- Surface area: 51 hectares

Hata Dam is a gravity dam located in Fukuoka Prefecture in Japan. The dam is used for water supply. The catchment area of the dam is 10.7 km^{2}. The dam impounds about 51 ha of land when full and can store 7349 thousand cubic meters of water. The construction of the dam was started on 1939 and completed in 1955.
