= Ishii Dam =

Dam in Yamaguchi Prefecture, Japan

- Location within Japan
- Interactive map of Ishii Dam
- Location: Yamaguchi Prefecture, Japan
- Coordinates: 33°59′42″N 132°6′46″E
- Construction began: 1972
- Opening date: 1992

Dam and spillways
- Height: 36.3 m (119 ft)
- Length: 176.3 m (578 ft)

Reservoir
- Total capacity: 1160 thousand cubic meters
- Catchment area: 2.3 sq. km
- Surface area: 12 hectares

Ishii Dam is an earthfill dam located in Yamaguchi prefecture in Japan. The dam is used for irrigation and water supply. The catchment area of the dam is 2.3 km^{2}. The dam impounds about 12 ha of land when full and can store 1160 thousand cubic meters of water. The construction of the dam was started on 1972 and completed in 1992.
