= Tamaizumi-ike Dam =

Dam in Yamaguchi Prefecture, Japan

- Location within Japan
- Location: Yamaguchi Prefecture, Japan
- Coordinates: 34°4′32″N 131°31′41″E
- Opening date: 1941

Dam and spillways
- Height: 19.5 m (64 ft)
- Length: 100 m (330 ft)

Reservoir
- Total capacity: 124,000 m^{3} (4,400,000 cu ft)
- Catchment area: 2 km^{2} (0.77 sq mi)
- Surface area: 2 hectares (4.9 acres)

Tamaizumi-ike Dam is an earthfill dam located in Yamaguchi prefecture in Japan. The dam is used for irrigation. The catchment area of the dam is 2 km^{2}. The dam impounds about 2 ha of land when full and can store 124 thousand cubic meters of water. The construction of the dam was completed in 1941.
