= Fukutani Tameike Dam =

Dam in Yamaguchi Prefecture, Japan

- Location within Japan
- Interactive map of Fukutani Tameike Dam
- Location: Yamaguchi Prefecture, Japan
- Coordinates: 34°25′14″N 131°42′23″E
- Opening date: 1926

Dam and spillways
- Height: 16.8 m (55 ft)
- Length: 75 m (246 ft)

Reservoir
- Total capacity: 260 thousand cubic meters
- Catchment area: 2 sq. km
- Surface area: 4 hectares

Fukutani Tameike Dam is an earthfill dam located in Yamaguchi prefecture in Japan. The dam is used for irrigation. The catchment area of the dam is 2 km^{2}. The dam impounds about 4 ha of land when full and can store 260 thousand cubic meters of water. The construction of the dam was started on and completed in 1926.
