= Kochi Dam (Yamaguchi) =

Dam in Yamaguchi Prefecture, Japan

- Location within Japan
- Location: Yamaguchi Prefecture, Japan
- Coordinates: 34°3′02″N 130°55′51″E
- Opening date: 1925

Dam and spillways
- Height: 22.6 m (74 ft)
- Length: 92 m (302 ft)

Reservoir
- Total capacity: 204 thousand cubic meters
- Catchment area: 0.8 sq. km
- Surface area: 3 hectares

Kochi Dam is an earthfill dam located in Yamaguchi prefecture in Japan. The dam is used for irrigation. The catchment area of the dam is 0.8 km^{2}. The dam impounds about 3 ha of land when full and can store 204 thousand cubic meters of water. The construction of the dam was completed in 1925.
