= Ushigasako-ike Dam =

Dam in Yamaguchi Prefecture, Japan

- Location within Japan
- Location: Yamaguchi Prefecture, Japan
- Coordinates: 34°21′17″N 131°0′57″E
- Opening date: 1914

Dam and spillways
- Height: 25.6 m (84 ft)
- Length: 80 m (260 ft)

Reservoir
- Total capacity: 192,000 m^{3} (6,800,000 cu ft)
- Catchment area: 0.8 km^{2} (0.31 sq mi)
- Surface area: 2 hectares (4.9 acres)

Ushigasako-ike Dam is an earthfill dam located in Yamaguchi prefecture in Japan. The dam is used for irrigation. The catchment area of the dam is 0.8 km^{2}. The dam impounds about 2 ha of land when full and can store 192 thousand cubic meters of water. The construction of the dam was completed in 1914.
