= Ikimigawa Dam =

Dam in Yamaguchi Prefecture, Japan

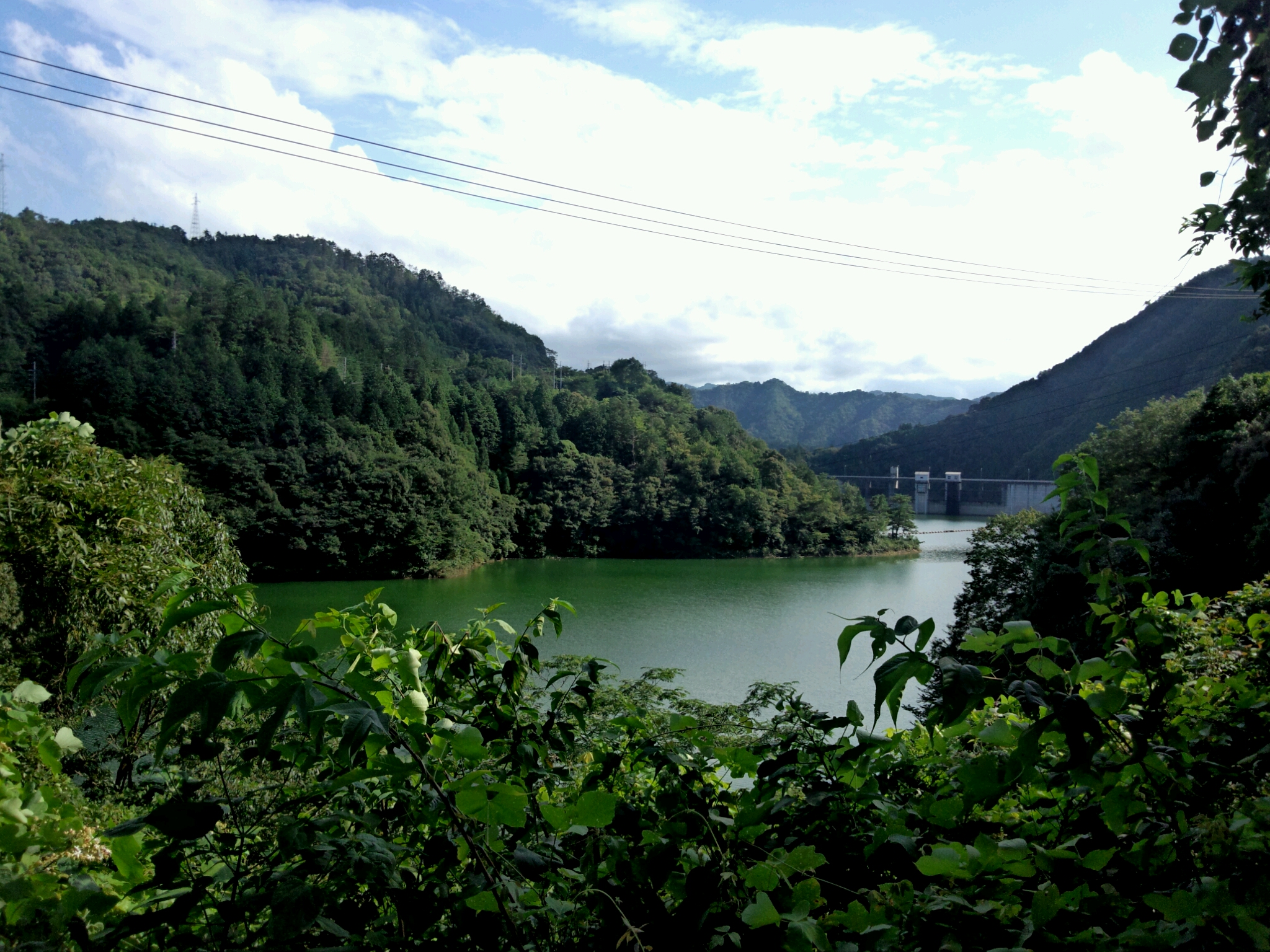
- Location: Yamaguchi Prefecture, Japan
- Coordinates: 34°12′06″N 132°2′42″E
- Construction began: 1969
- Opening date: 1984

Dam and spillways
- Height: 90m
- Length: 215m

Reservoir
- Total capacity: 30800
- Catchment area: 72.4
- Surface area: 109 hectares

Ikimigawa Dam is a gravity dam located in Yamaguchi prefecture in Japan. The dam is used for flood control, irrigation and power production. The catchment area of the dam is 72.4 km^{2}. The dam impounds about 109 ha of land when full and can store 30800 thousand cubic meters of water. The construction of the dam was started on 1969 and completed in 1984.
