= Sasanamigawa Dam =

Dam in Yamaguchi Prefecture, Japan

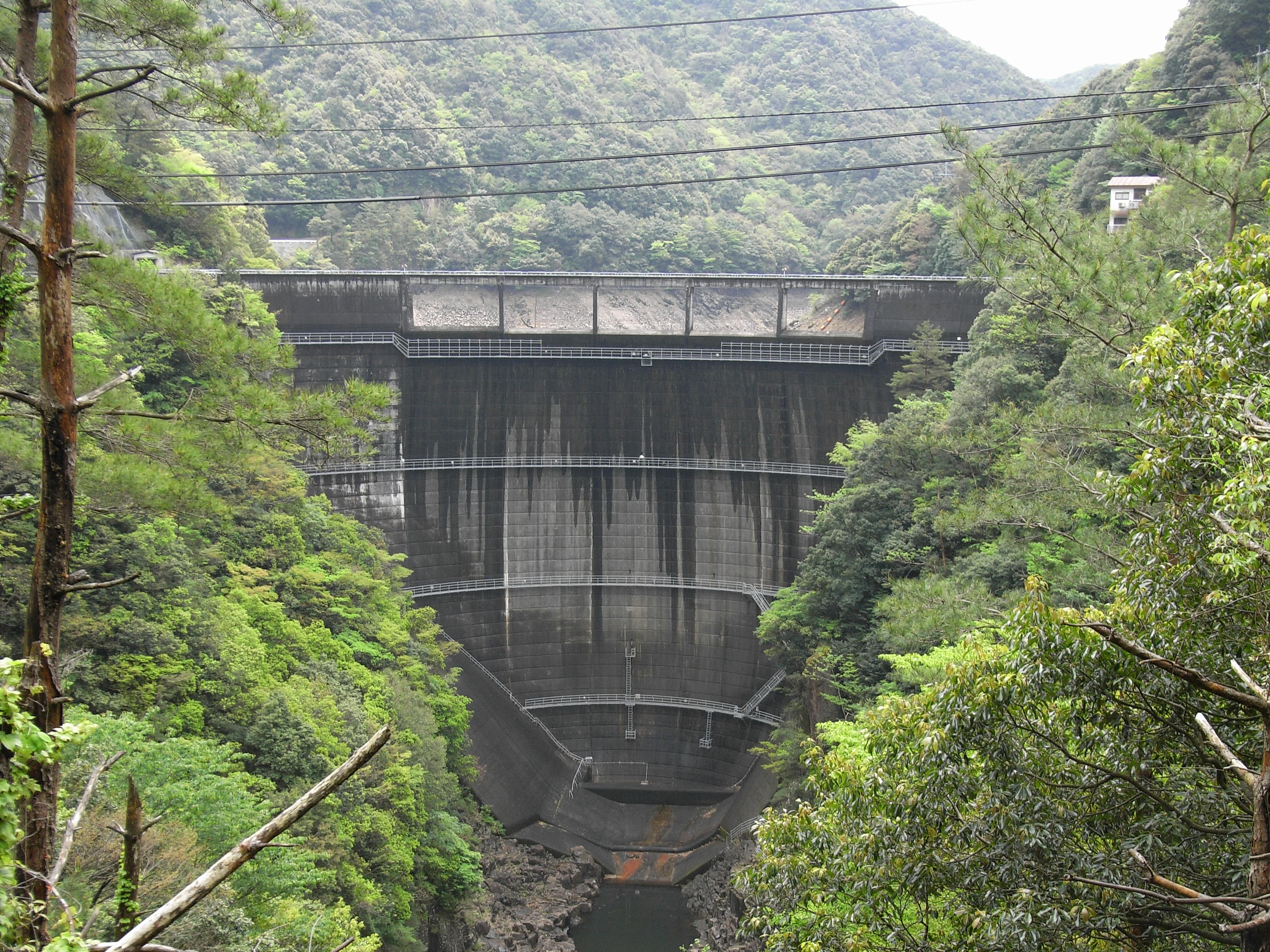

- Location within Japan
- Location: Yamaguchi Prefecture, Japan
- Coordinates: 34°19′26″N 131°30′26″E
- Construction began: 1956
- Opening date: 1959

Dam and spillways
- Height: 67.4 m (221 ft)
- Length: 127.3 m (418 ft)

Reservoir
- Total capacity: 20,100,000 m^{3} (710,000,000 cu ft)
- Catchment area: 91.5 km^{2} (35.3 sq mi)
- Surface area: 96 hectares (240 acres)

Sasanamigawa Dam is an arch dam located in Yamaguchi prefecture in Japan. The dam is used for power production. The catchment area of the dam is 91.5 km^{2}. The dam impounds about 96 ha of land when full and can store 20100 thousand cubic meters of water. The construction of the dam was started on 1956 and completed in 1959.
