= Midoriyama-ike Dam =

Dam in Yamaguchi Prefecture, Japan

Midoriyama-ike
- Location within Japan
- Location: Yamaguchi Prefecture, Japan
- Coordinates: 34°8′35″N 131°51′19″E
- Opening date: 1932

Dam and spillways
- Height: 15 m (49 ft)
- Length: 65 m (213 ft)

Reservoir
- Total capacity: 50 thousand cubic meters
- Catchment area: 0.6 sq. km
- Surface area: 1 hectares

Midoriyama-ike is an earthfill dam located in Yamaguchi prefecture in Japan. The dam is used for irrigation. The catchment area of the dam is 0.6 km^{2}. The dam impounds about 1 ha of land when full and can store 50 thousand cubic meters of water. The construction of the dam was completed in 1932.
