= Kawakami Dam (Mie) =

Dam in Mie Prefecture, Japan

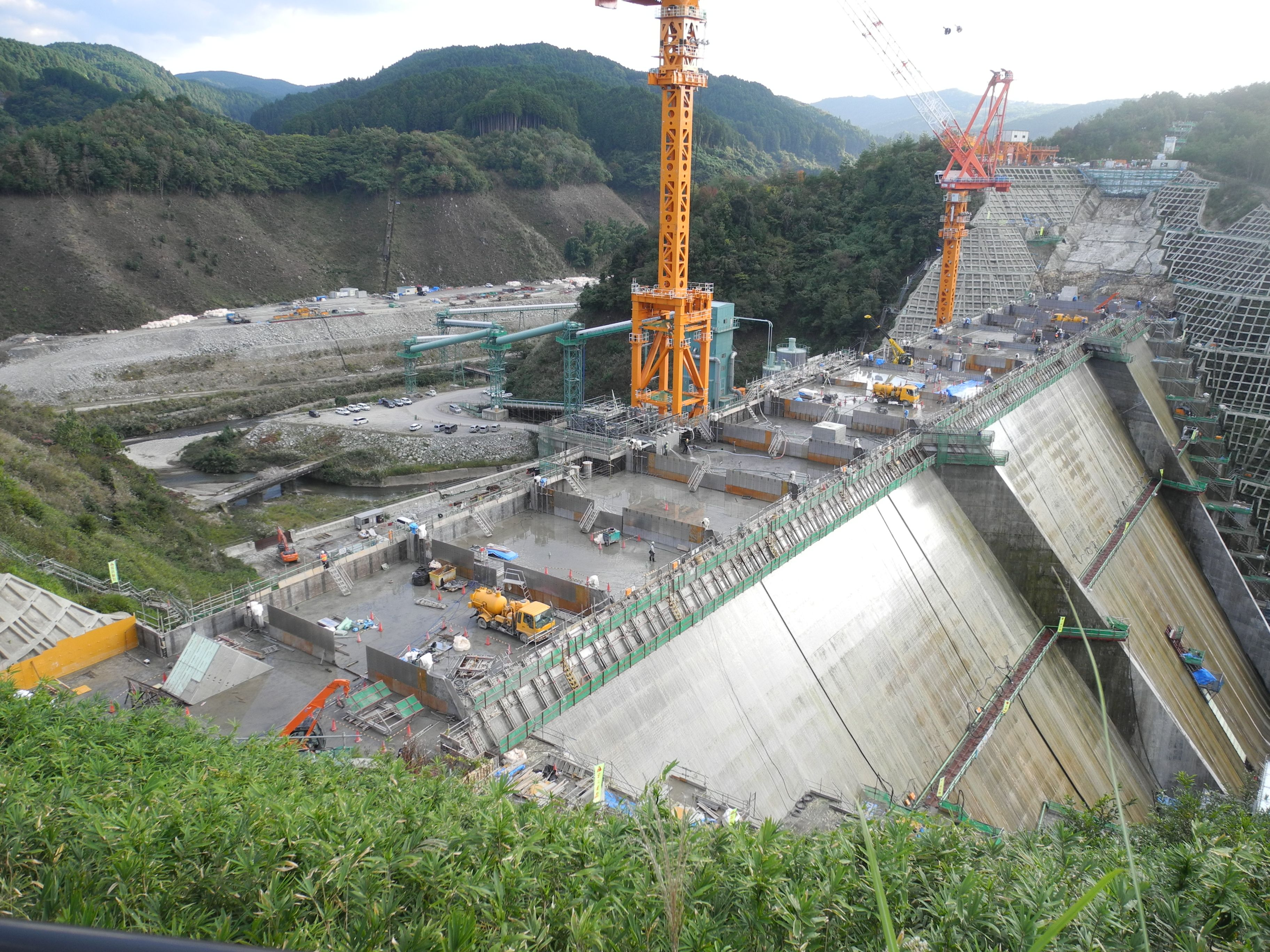

- Location within Japan
- Official name: 川上ダム
- Location: Mie Prefecture, Japan
- Coordinates: 34°39′21″N 136°11′10″E
- Construction began: 1981

Dam and spillways
- Height: 84 m (276 ft)
- Length: 334 m (1,096 ft)

Reservoir
- Total capacity: 31000 thousand cubic meters
- Catchment area: 54.7 sq. km
- Surface area: 104 hectares

Kawakami Dam (Japanese: 川上ダム) is a gravity dam located in Mie Prefecture in Japan. The dam is used for flood control and water supply. The catchment area of the dam is 54.7 km^{2}. The dam impounds about 104 ha of land when full and can store 31000 thousand cubic meters of water. The construction of the dam was started on 1981.

== See also ==
- List of dams in Japan
