= Kochi Dam (Mie) =

Dam in Mie Prefecture, Japan

- Location within Japan
- Official name: 河内ダム
- Location: Mie Prefecture, Japan
- Coordinates: 34°26′20″N 136°48′51″E
- Construction began: 1951
- Opening date: 1963

Dam and spillways
- Height: 24 m (79 ft)
- Length: 78 m (256 ft)

Reservoir
- Total capacity: 761 thousand cubic meters
- Catchment area: 9.2 sq. km
- Surface area: 13 hectares

Kochi Dam (Japanese: 河内ダム) is a gravity dam located in Mie Prefecture in Japan. The dam is used for flood control. The catchment area of the dam is 9.2 km^{2}. The dam impounds about 13 ha of land when full and can store 761 thousand cubic meters of water. The construction of the dam was started on 1951 and completed in 1963.

== See also ==
- List of dams in Japan
