= Mishima Dam (Yamaguchi) =

Dam in Yamaguchi Prefecture, Japan

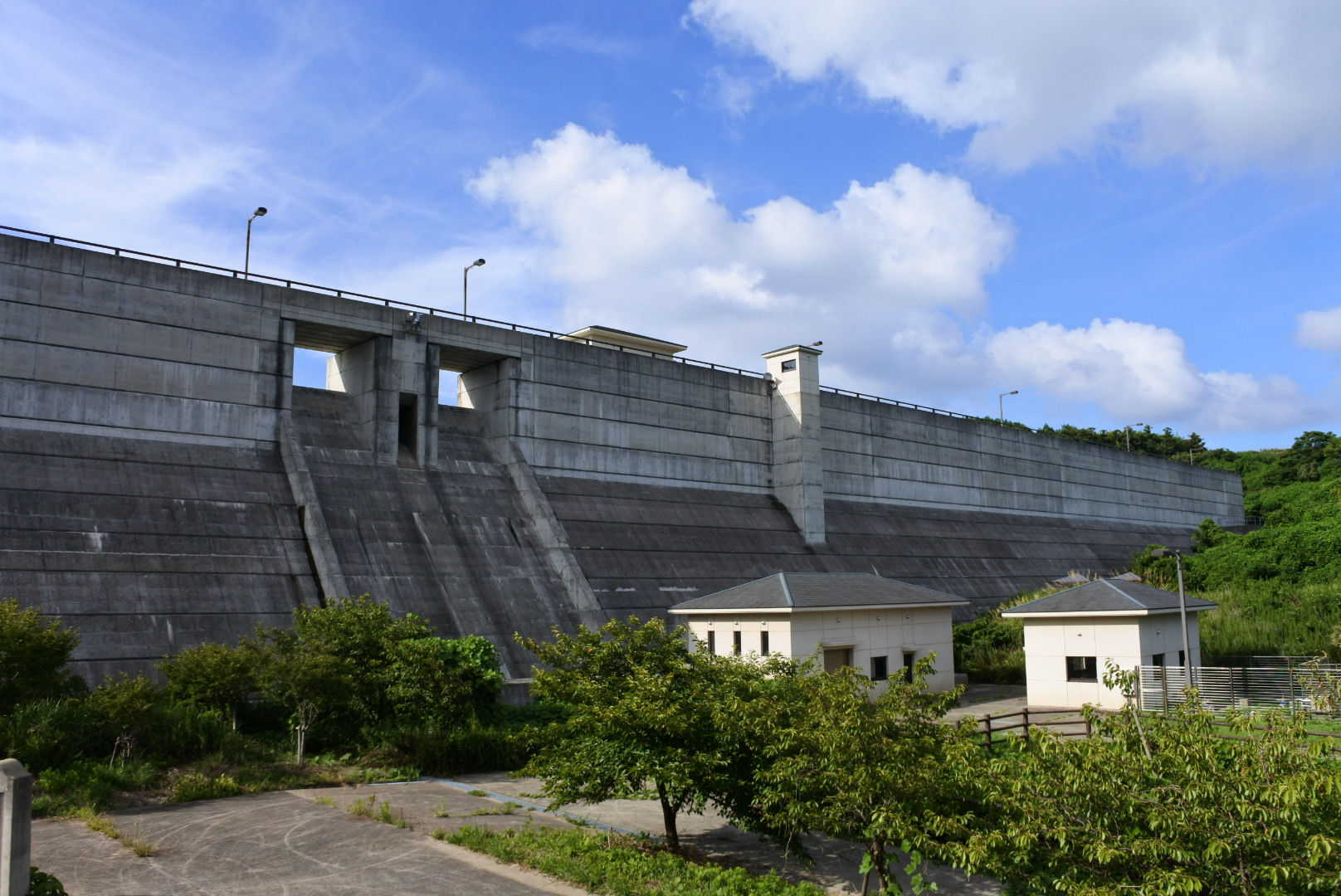

- Location within Japan
- Location: Yamaguchi Prefecture, Japan
- Coordinates: 34°46′12″N 131°9′15″E
- Construction began: 1992
- Opening date: 2001

Dam and spillways
- Height: 31 m (102 ft)
- Length: 300 m (980 ft)

Reservoir
- Total capacity: 125 thousand cubic meters
- Catchment area: 0.4 sq. km
- Surface area: 1 hectares

Mishima Dam is a gravity dam located in Yamaguchi prefecture in Japan. The dam is used for flood control and water supply. The catchment area of the dam is 0.4 km^{2}. The dam impounds about 1 ha of land when full and can store 125 thousand cubic meters of water. The construction of the dam was started on 1992 and completed in 2001.
