= Ikumo Dam =

Dam in Yamaguchi Prefecture, Japan

- Location within Japan
- Interactive map of Ikumo Dam
- Location: Yamaguchi Prefecture, Japan
- Coordinates: 34°19′51″N 131°34′23″E
- Opening date: 1953

Dam and spillways
- Height: 17.5 m (57 ft)
- Length: 66 m (217 ft)

Reservoir
- Total capacity: 346 thousand cubic meters
- Catchment area: 212.1 sq. km
- Surface area: 7 hectares

Ikumo Dam is a gravity dam located in Yamaguchi prefecture in Japan. The dam is used for power production. The catchment area of the dam is 212.1 km^{2}. The dam impounds about 7 ha of land when full and can store 346 thousand cubic meters of water. The construction of the dam was completed in 1953.
