= Toro-ike Dam =

Dam in Yamaguchi Prefecture, Japan

Toro-ike
- Location within Japan
- Location: Yamaguchi Prefecture, Japan
- Coordinates: 34°4′24″N 131°35′38″E
- Opening date: 1988

Dam and spillways
- Height: 15.2 m (50 ft)
- Length: 107 m (351 ft)

Reservoir
- Total capacity: 57,000 m^{3} (2,000,000 cu ft)
- Catchment area: 0.6 km^{2} (0.23 sq mi)
- Surface area: 1 hectare (2.5 acres)

Toro-ike is an earthfill dam located in Yamaguchi prefecture in Japan. The dam, used for irrigation, has a catchment area of 0.6 km^{2}. It impounds about 1 ha of land when full and can store 57 thousand cubic meters of water. The construction of the dam was completed in 1988.
