= Majimegawa Dam =

Dam in Yamaguchi Prefecture, Japan

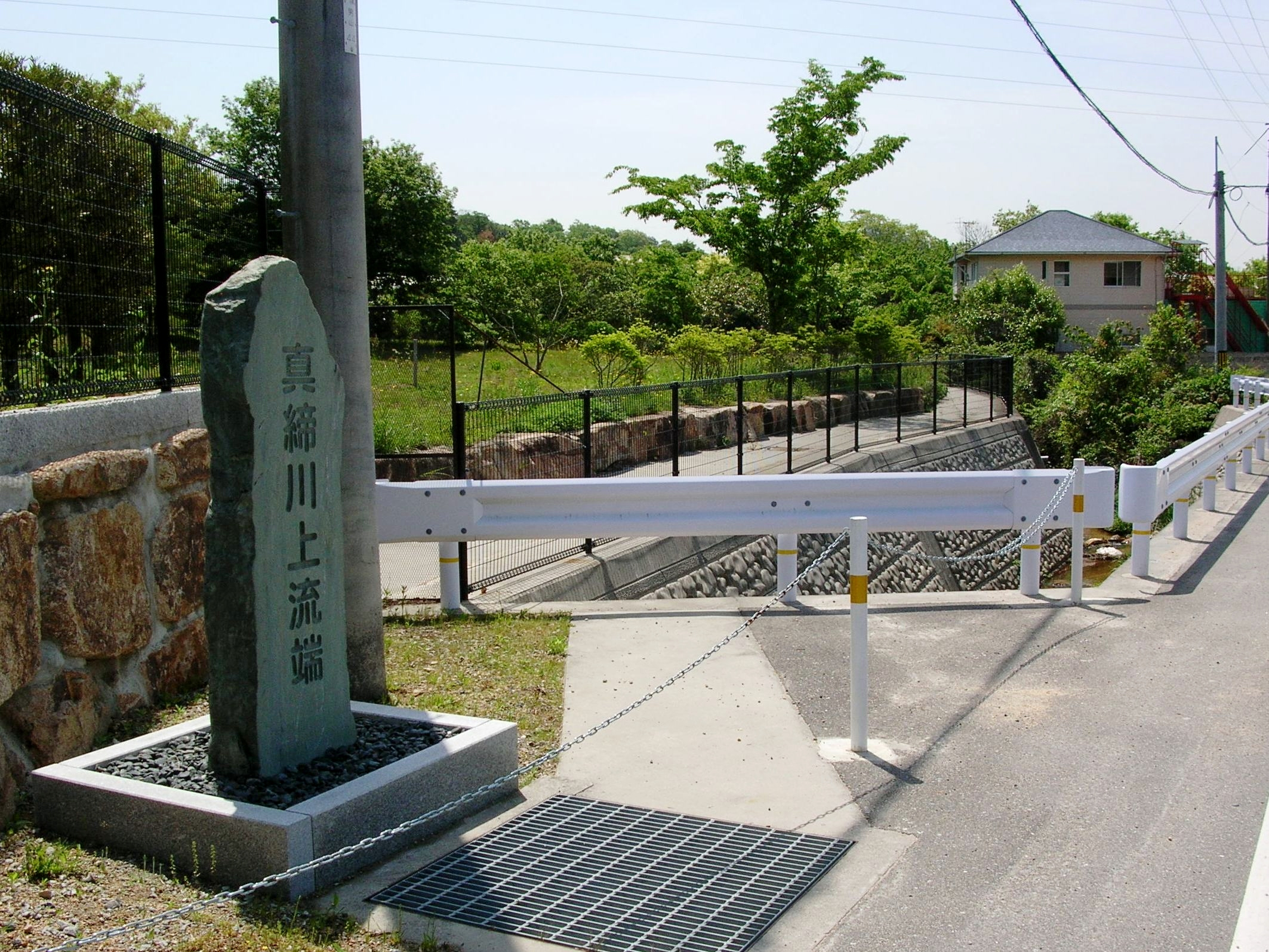

- Location within Japan
- Location: Yamaguchi Prefecture, Japan
- Coordinates: 33°59′36″N 131°16′13″E
- Construction began: 1992
- Opening date: 2008

Dam and spillways
- Height: 21.9 m (72 ft)
- Length: 354.5 m (1,163 ft)

Reservoir
- Total capacity: 842 thousand cubic meters
- Catchment area: 2.4 sq. km
- Surface area: 12 hectares

Majimegawa Dam is an earthfill dam located in Yamaguchi prefecture in Japan. The dam is used for flood control. The catchment area of the dam is 2.4 km^{2}. The dam impounds about 12 ha of land when full and can store 842 thousand cubic meters of water. The construction of the dam was started on 1992 and completed in 2008.
