= Tatara Dam =

Dam in Yamaguchi Prefecture, Japan

- Location within Japan
- Location: Yamaguchi Prefecture, Japan
- Coordinates: 34°16′10″N 131°13′41″E
- Opening date: 1917

Dam and spillways
- Height: 17.5 m (57 ft)
- Length: 60 m (200 ft)

Reservoir
- Total capacity: 92,000 m^{3} (3,200,000 cu ft)
- Catchment area: 1.6 km^{2} (0.62 sq mi)
- Surface area: 1 hectare (2.5 acres)

Tatara Dam is an earthfill dam located in Yamaguchi prefecture in Japan. The dam is used for irrigation. The catchment area of the dam is 1.6 km^{2}. The dam impounds about 1 ha of land when full and can store 92 thousand cubic meters of water. The construction of the dam was completed in 1917.
