= Ohkochigawa Dam =

Dam in Yamaguchi Prefecture, Japan

- Location within Japan
- Location: Yamaguchi Prefecture, Japan
- Coordinates: 34°20′04″N 131°12′03″E
- Construction began: 1975

Dam and spillways
- Height: 62 m (203 ft)
- Length: 155 m (509 ft)

Reservoir
- Total capacity: 4,190,000 m^{3} (148,000,000 cu ft)
- Catchment area: 12.4 km^{2} (4.8 sq mi)
- Surface area: 23 hectares (57 acres)

Ohkochigawa Dam is a gravity dam located in Yamaguchi prefecture in Japan. The dam is used for flood control and water supply. The catchment area of the dam is 12.4 km^{2}. The dam impounds about 23 ha of land when full and can store 4190 thousand cubic meters of water. The construction of the dam was started on 1975.
