= Yumen Dam =

Dam in Yamaguchi Prefecture, Japan

- Location within Japan
- Location: Yamaguchi Prefecture, Japan
- Coordinates: 34°20′34″N 131°16′06″E
- Construction began: 1993
- Opening date: 2006

Dam and spillways
- Height: 46 m (151 ft)
- Length: 200 m (660 ft)

Reservoir
- Total capacity: 740,000 m^{3} (26,000,000 cu ft)
- Catchment area: 1.9 km^{2} (0.73 sq mi)
- Surface area: 4 hectares (9.9 acres)

Yumen Dam is a gravity dam located in Yamaguchi prefecture in Japan. The dam is used for flood control and water supply. The catchment area of the dam is 1.9 km^{2}. The dam impounds about 4 ha of land when full and can store 740 thousand cubic meters of water. The construction of the dam was started on 1993 and completed in 2006.
