= Showa-ike Dam (Yamaguchi) =

Dam in Yamaguchi Prefecture, Japan

Showa-ike
- Location within Japan
- Location: Yamaguchi Prefecture, Japan
- Coordinates: 34°5′25″N 131°28′48″E
- Construction began: 1939
- Opening date: 1945

Dam and spillways
- Height: 17.5 m (57 ft)
- Length: 84 m (276 ft)

Reservoir
- Total capacity: 120,000 m^{3} (4,200,000 cu ft)
- Catchment area: 91 km^{2} (35 sq mi)
- Surface area: 2 hectares (4.9 acres)

Showa-ike is an earthfill dam located in Yamaguchi prefecture in Japan. The dam is used for irrigation. The catchment area of the dam is 91 km^{2}. The dam impounds about 2 ha of land when full and can store 120 thousand cubic meters of water. The construction of the dam was started on 1939 and completed in 1945.
