= Nodo Tameike =

Dam in Yamaguchi Prefecture, Japan

- Location within Japan
- Location: Yamaguchi Prefecture, Japan
- Coordinates: 34°22′42″N 131°43′28″E
- Opening date: 1957

Dam and spillways
- Height: 22.3 m (73 ft)
- Length: 204.9 m (672 ft)

Reservoir
- Total capacity: 565,000 m^{3} (20,000,000 cu ft)
- Catchment area: 3.2 km^{2} (1.2 sq mi)
- Surface area: 7 hectares (17 acres)

Nodo Tameike is an earthfill dam located in Yamaguchi prefecture in Japan. The dam is used for irrigation. The catchment area of the dam is 3.2 km^{2}. The dam impounds about 7 ha of land when full and can store 565 thousand cubic meters of water. The construction of the dam was completed in 1957.
