= Ekiyama No.1 Tameike Dam =

Dam in Yamaguchi Prefecture, Japan

- Location within Japan
- Interactive map of Ekiyama No.1 Tameike Dam
- Location: Yamaguchi Prefecture, Japan
- Coordinates: 34°21′46″N 131°9′05″E
- Opening date: 1919

Dam and spillways
- Height: 22.7 m (74 ft)
- Length: 72 m (236 ft)

Reservoir
- Total capacity: 120 thousand cubic meters
- Catchment area: 0.4 sq. km
- Surface area: 1 hectares

Ekiyama No.1 Tameike Dam is an earthfill dam located in Yamaguchi prefecture in Japan. The dam is used for irrigation. The catchment area of the dam is 0.4 km^{2}. The dam impounds about 1 ha of land when full and can store 120 thousand cubic meters of water. The construction of the dam was completed in 1919.
