= Abugawa Dam =

Dam in Yamaguchi Prefecture, Japan

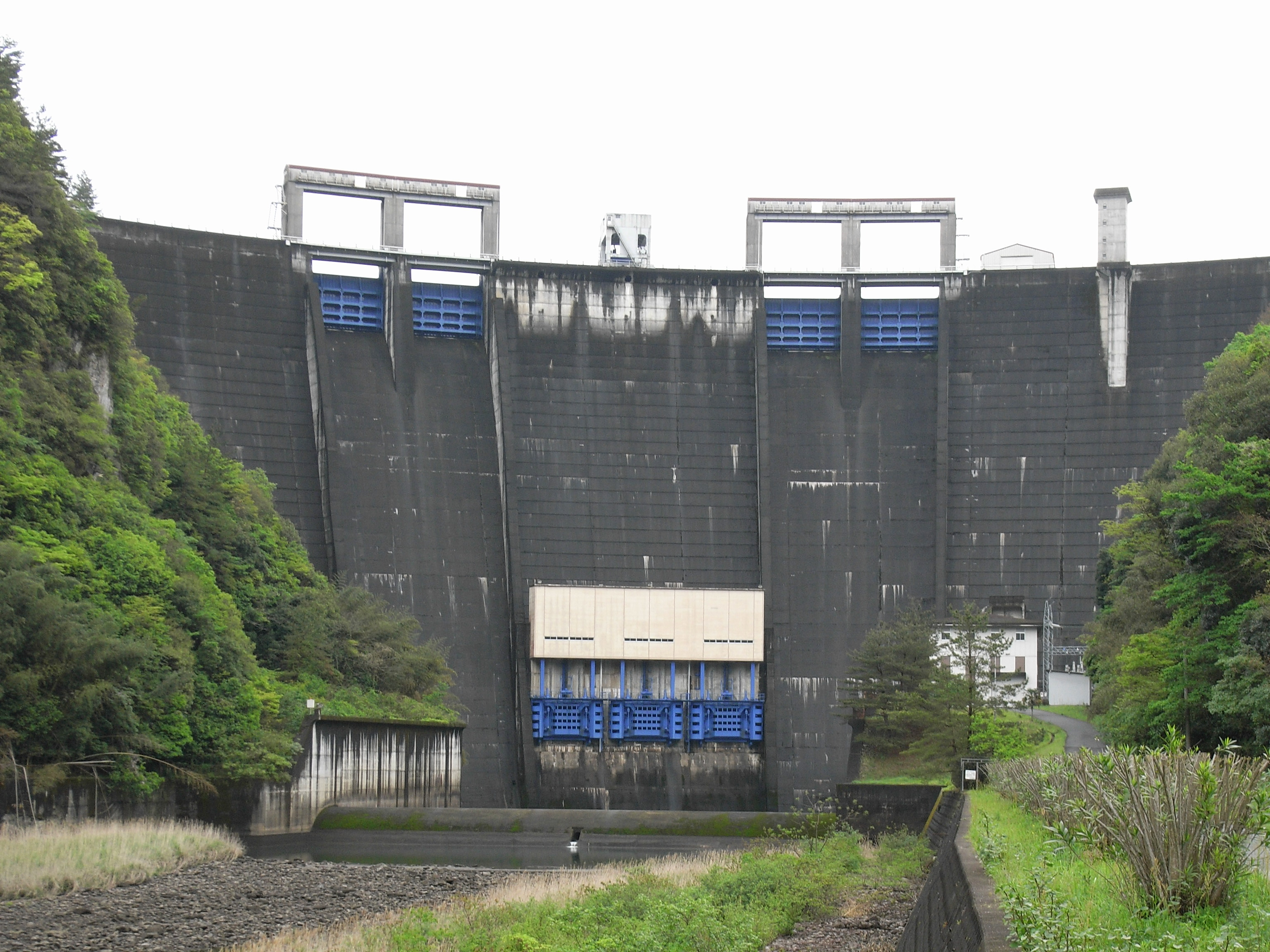
- Interactive map of Abugawa Dam
- Location: Yamaguchi Prefecture, Japan
- Coordinates: 34°21′33″N 131°29′15″E
- Construction began: 1966
- Opening date: 1974

Dam and spillways
- Height: 95m
- Length: 286m

Reservoir
- Total capacity: 153500
- Catchment area: 523
- Surface area: 420 hectares

Abugawa Dam is an arch gravity dam located in Yamaguchi prefecture in Japan. The dam is used for flood control and power production. The catchment area of the dam is 523 km^{2}. The dam impounds about 420 ha of land when full and can store 153500 thousand cubic meters of water. The construction of the dam was started on 1966 and completed in 1974.
