= Yunohara Dam =

Dam in Yamaguchi Prefecture, Japan

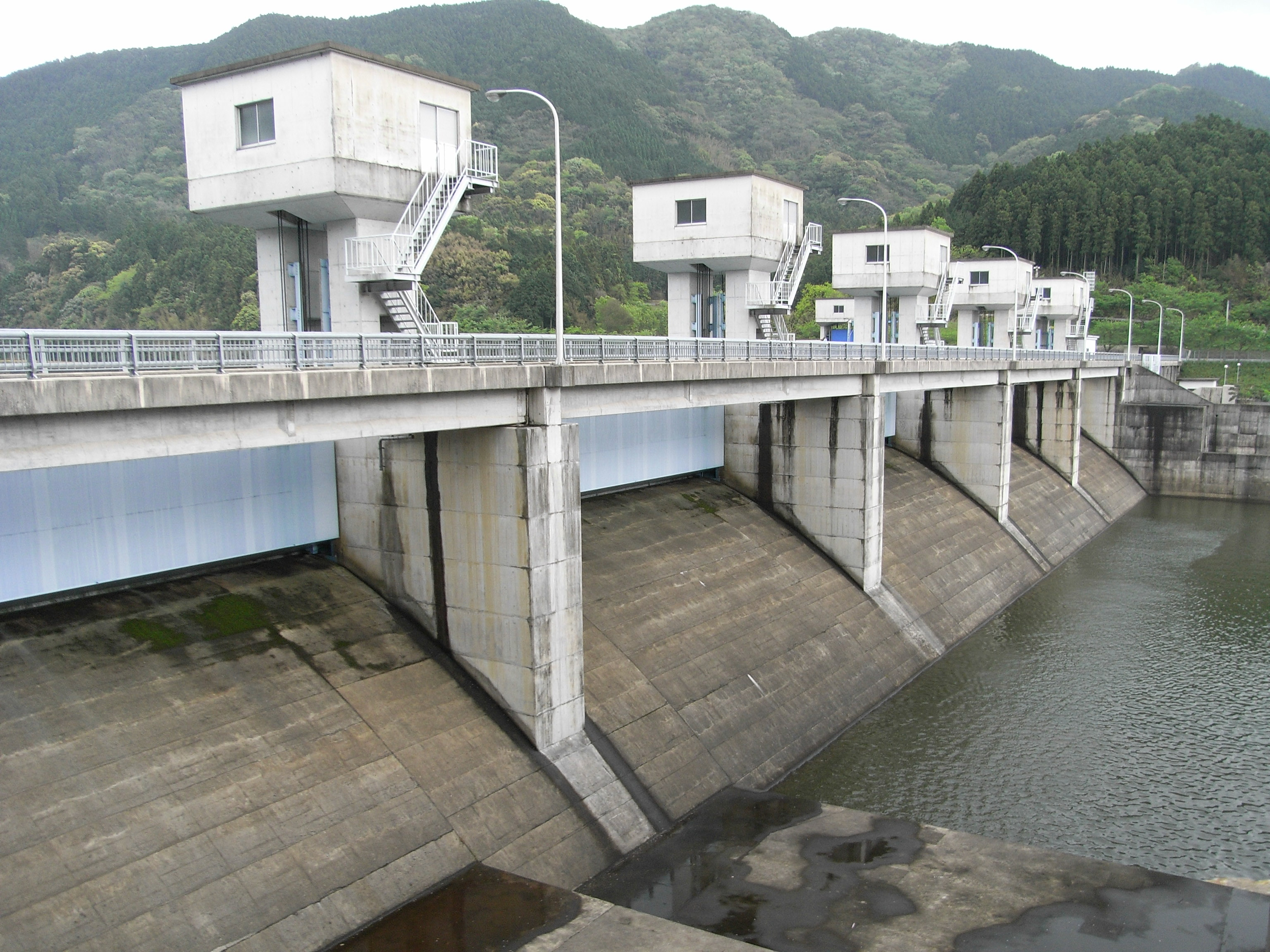
- Location: Yamaguchi Prefecture, Japan
- Coordinates: 34°8′27″N 131°2′38″E
- Construction began: 1972
- Opening date: 1990

Dam and spillways
- Height: 18.5m
- Length: 212.9m

Reservoir
- Total capacity: 2930
- Catchment area: 185.7
- Surface area: 62 hectares

Yunohara Dam is a concrete gravity dam located in Yamaguchi prefecture in Japan. The dam is used for irrigation and water supply. The catchment area of the dam is 185.7 km^{2}. The dam impounds about 62 ha of land when full and can store 2930 thousand cubic meters of water. The construction of the dam was started in 1972 and completed in 1990.
