= Utanokawa Dam =

Dam in Yamaguchi Prefecture, Japan

- Location within Japan
- Location: Yamaguchi Prefecture, Japan
- Coordinates: 34°9′11″N 131°1′35″E
- Construction began: 1972
- Opening date: 1980

Dam and spillways
- Height: 44 m (144 ft)
- Length: 162 m (531 ft)

Reservoir
- Total capacity: 1,614,000 m^{3} (57,000,000 cu ft)
- Catchment area: 6.1 km^{2} (2.4 sq mi)
- Surface area: 13 hectares (32 acres)

Utanokawa Dam is a gravity dam located in Yamaguchi prefecture in Japan. The dam is used for flood control and irrigation. The catchment area of the dam is 6.1 km^{2}. The dam impounds about 13 ha of land when full and can store 1614 thousand cubic meters of water. The construction of the dam was started on 1972 and completed in 1980.
