= Mizukoshi Dam =

Dam in Yamaguchi Prefecture, Japan

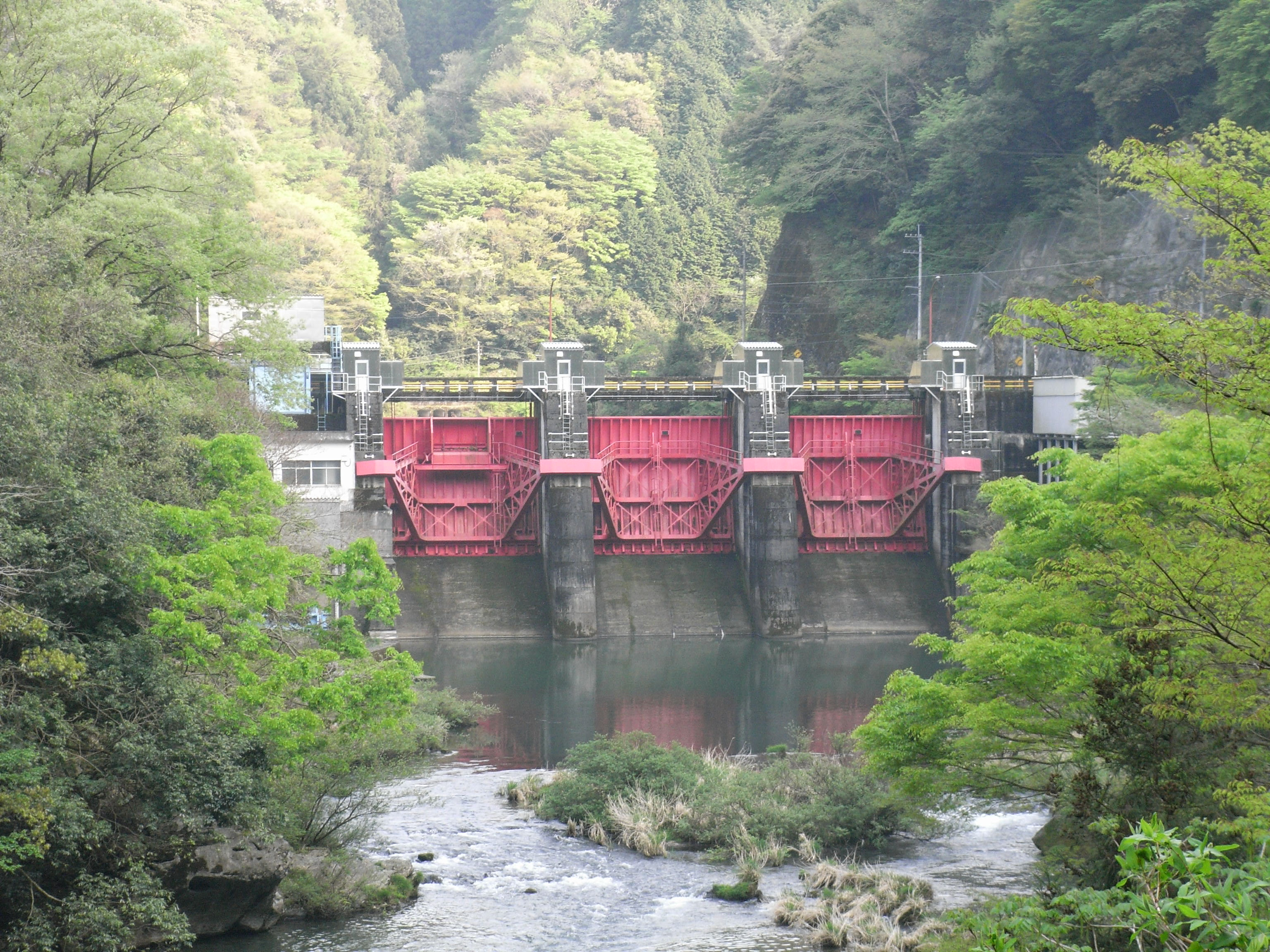
- Location: Yamaguchi Prefecture, Japan
- Coordinates: 34°9′52″N 131°54′41″E
- Opening date: 1965

Dam and spillways
- Height: 18.8m
- Length: 81.7m

Reservoir
- Total capacity: 796
- Catchment area: 270
- Surface area: 14 hectares

Mizukoshi Dam is a gravity barrage type dam located in Yamaguchi prefecture in Japan. The dam is used for power production. The catchment area of the dam is 270 km^{2}. The dam impounds about 14 ha of land when full and can store 796 thousand cubic meters of water. The construction of the dam was started on and completed in 1965.
