= Yamanokuchi Dam =

Dam in Yamaguchi Prefecture, Japan

- Location within Japan
- Location: Yamaguchi Prefecture, Japan
- Coordinates: 34°29′53″N 131°32′20″E
- Construction began: 1975
- Opening date: 1984

Dam and spillways
- Height: 40.2 m (132 ft)
- Length: 103 m (338 ft)

Reservoir
- Total capacity: 690,000 m^{3} (24,000,000 cu ft)
- Catchment area: 2.1 km^{2} (0.81 sq mi)
- Surface area: 7 hectares (17 acres)

Yamanokuchi Dam is a gravity dam located in Yamaguchi prefecture in Japan. The dam is used for irrigation. The catchment area of the dam is 2.1 km^{2}. The dam impounds about 7 ha of land when full and can store 690 thousand cubic meters of water. The construction of the dam was started on 1975 and completed in 1984.
