= Aso Dam =

Dam in Yamaguchi Prefecture, Japan

- Location within Japan
- Interactive map of Aso Dam
- Location: Yamaguchi Prefecture, Japan
- Coordinates: 34°20′55″N 131°2′50″E
- Construction began: 1993
- Opening date: 2002

Dam and spillways
- Height: 44.2 m (145 ft)
- Length: 134 m (440 ft)

Reservoir
- Total capacity: 1320 thousand cubic meters
- Catchment area: 2.9 sq. km
- Surface area: 10 hectares

Aso Dam is a gravity dam located in Yamaguchi prefecture in Japan, used for irrigation. The catchment area of the dam is 2.9 km^{2} (1.1 sq mi) and can store 1,320,000 m^{3} (46,615,360.1 cu ft) of water. The construction of the dam was started on 1993 and completed in 2002.
