= Kurokui Dam =

Dam in Yamaguchi Prefecture, Japan

- Location within Japan
- Location: Yamaguchi Prefecture, Japan
- Coordinates: 34°0′16″N 132°4′47″E
- Opening date: 1939

Dam and spillways
- Height: 16.9 m (55 ft)
- Length: 65 m (213 ft)

Reservoir
- Total capacity: 246 thousand cubic meters
- Catchment area: 3.2 sq. km
- Surface area: 6 hectares

Kurokui Dam is an earthfill dam located in Yamaguchi prefecture in Japan. The dam is used for water supply. The catchment area of the dam is 3.2 km^{2}. The dam impounds about 6 ha of land when full and can store 246 thousand cubic meters of water. The construction of the dam was completed in 1939.
