= Agari Tameike Dam =

Dam in Yamaguchi Prefecture, Japan

Agari Tameike
- Location within Japan
- Location: Yamaguchi Prefecture, Japan
- Coordinates: 34°4′53″N 130°55′31″E
- Opening date: 1886

Dam and spillways
- Height: 15 m (49 ft)
- Length: 56 m (184 ft)

Reservoir
- Total capacity: 22,000 m^{3} (780,000 cu ft)
- Catchment area: 0.5 km^{2} (0.19 sq mi)
- Surface area: 1 hectare (2.5 acres)

Agari Tameike is an earthfill dam located in Yamaguchi prefecture in Japan. The dam is used for irrigation. The catchment area of the dam is 0.5 km^{2}. The dam impounds about 1 ha of land when full and can store 22 thousand cubic meters of water. The construction of the dam was completed in 1886.
