= Asinodani Tameike Dam =

Dam in Yamaguchi Prefecture, Japan

- Location within Japan
- Interactive map of Asinodani Tameike Dam
- Location: Yamaguchi Prefecture, Japan
- Coordinates: 34°7′13″N 131°56′09″E
- Opening date: 1988

Dam and spillways
- Height: 20.1 m (66 ft)
- Length: 141 m (463 ft)

Reservoir
- Total capacity: 123 thousand cubic meters
- Catchment area: 1.3 sq. km
- Surface area: 2 hectares

Asinodani Tameike Dam is an earthfill dam located in Yamaguchi prefecture in Japan. The dam is used for irrigation. The catchment area of the dam is 1.3 km^{2}. The dam impounds about 2 ha of land when full and can store 123 thousand cubic meters of water. The construction of the dam was completed in 1988.
