= Funagori Dam =

Dam in Yamaguchi Prefecture, Japan

- Location within Japan
- Interactive map of Funagori Dam
- Location: Yamaguchi Prefecture, Japan
- Coordinates: 34°8′15″N 130°56′41″E
- Construction began: 1989
- Opening date: 2002

Dam and spillways
- Height: 28 m (92 ft)
- Length: 221 m (725 ft)

Reservoir
- Total capacity: 540 thousand cubic meters
- Catchment area: 0.9 sq. km
- Surface area: 7 hectares

Funagori Dam is a rockfill dam located in Yamaguchi prefecture in Japan. The dam is used for irrigation. The catchment area of the dam is 0.9 km^{2}. The dam impounds about 7 ha of land when full and can store 540 thousand cubic meters of water. The construction of the dam was started on 1989 and completed in 2002.
