= Nakayamagawa Dam =

Dam in Yamaguchi Prefecture, Japan

- Location within Japan
- Location: Yamaguchi Prefecture, Japan
- Coordinates: 34°3′26″N 132°3′08″E
- Construction began: 1974
- Opening date: 1995

Dam and spillways
- Height: 37 m (121 ft)
- Length: 143 m (469 ft)

Reservoir
- Total capacity: 7550 thousand cubic meters
- Catchment area: 15 sq. km
- Surface area: 57 hectares

Nakayamagawa Dam is a gravity dam located in Yamaguchi prefecture in Japan. The dam is used for flood control and water supply. The catchment area of the dam is 15 km^{2}. The dam impounds about 57 ha of land when full and can store 7550 thousand cubic meters of water. The construction of the dam was started on 1974 and completed in 1995.
