= Tsuenokochi No.1 Tameike Dam =

Dam in Yamaguchi Prefecture, Japan

- Location within Japan
- Location: Yamaguchi Prefecture, Japan
- Coordinates: 34°21′37″N 131°9′24″E
- Opening date: 1907

Dam and spillways
- Height: 16.4 m (54 ft)
- Length: 106 m (348 ft)

Reservoir
- Total capacity: 126,000 m^{3} (4,400,000 cu ft)
- Catchment area: 0.6 km^{2} (0.23 sq mi)
- Surface area: 2 hectares (4.9 acres)

Tsuenokochi No.1 Tameike Dam is an earthfill dam located in Yamaguchi prefecture in Japan. The dam is used for irrigation. The catchment area of the dam is 0.6 km^{2}. The dam impounds about 2 ha of land when full and can store 126 thousand cubic meters of water. The construction of the dam was started on and completed in 1907.
