= Ichinosaka Dam =

Dam in Yamaguchi Prefecture, Japan

- Location within Japan
- Interactive map of Ichinosaka Dam
- Location: Yamaguchi Prefecture, Japan
- Coordinates: 34°12′14″N 131°28′09″E
- Construction began: 1971
- Opening date: 1983

Dam and spillways
- Height: 42.1 m (138 ft)
- Length: 143.5 m (471 ft)

Reservoir
- Total capacity: 1485 thousand cubic meters
- Catchment area: 6.7 sq. km
- Surface area: 14 hectares

Ichinosaka Dam is a gravity dam located in Yamaguchi prefecture in Japan. The dam is used for flood control. The catchment area of the dam is 6.7 km^{2}. The dam impounds about 14 ha of land when full and can store 1485 thousand cubic meters of water. The construction of the dam was started on 1971 and completed in 1983.
