= Kurokuigawajoryu Dam =

Dam in Yamaguchi Prefecture, Japan

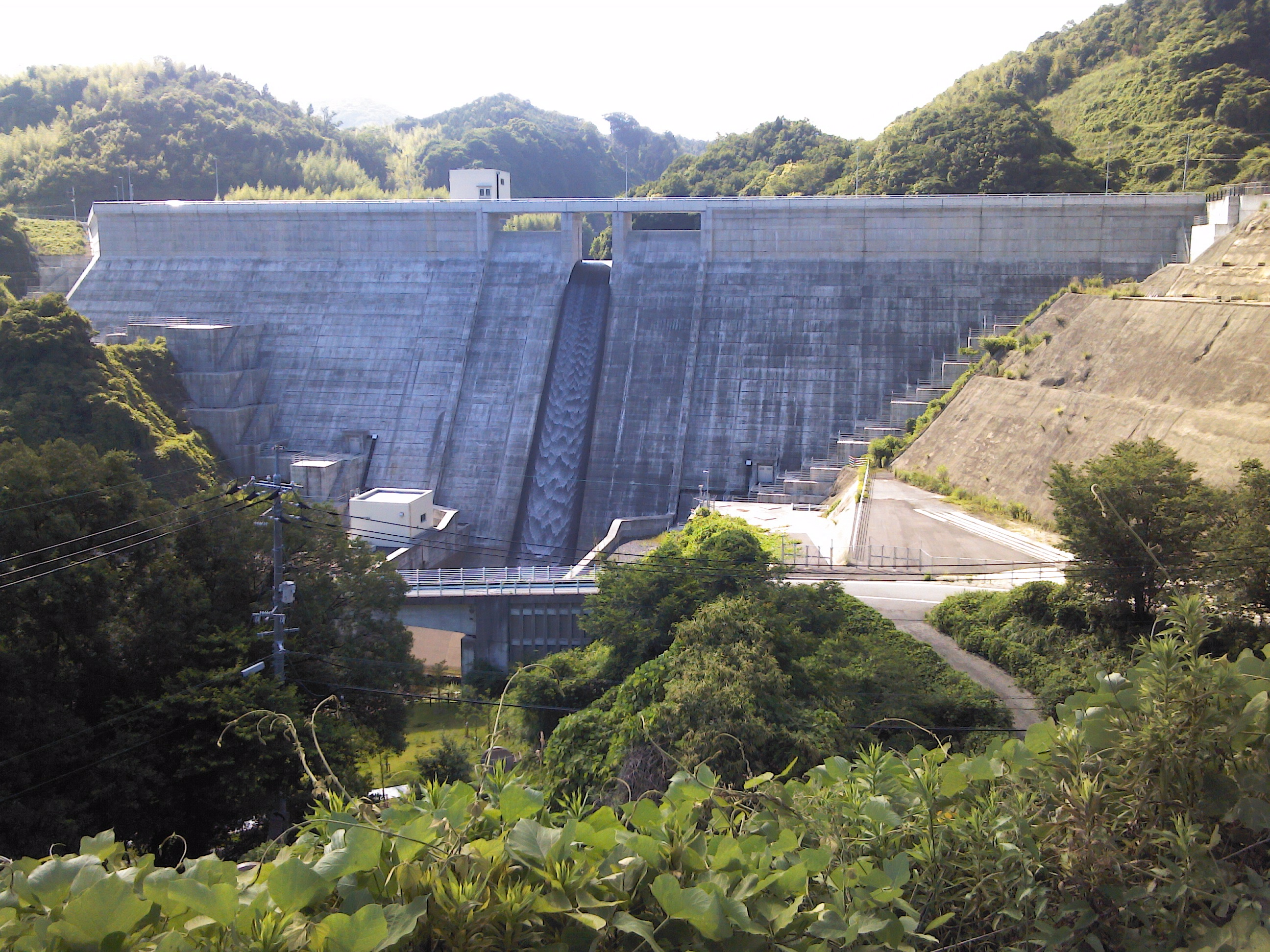

- Location within Japan
- Location: Yamaguchi Prefecture, Japan
- Coordinates: 33°59′48″N 132°5′14″E
- Construction began: 1991
- Opening date: 2011

Dam and spillways
- Height: 48 m (157 ft)
- Length: 253 m (830 ft)

Reservoir
- Total capacity: 450 thousand cubic meters
- Catchment area: 7.7 sq. km
- Surface area: 3 hectares

Kurokuigawajoryu Dam is a gravity dam located in Yamaguchi prefecture in Japan. The dam is used for flood control. The catchment area of the dam is 7.7 km^{2}. The dam impounds about 3 ha of land when full and can store 450 thousand cubic meters of water. The construction of the dam was started on 1991 and completed in 2011.
