= Misaka Dam =

Dam in Yamaguchi Prefecture, Japan

- Location within Japan
- Location: Yamaguchi Prefecture, Japan
- Coordinates: 34°2′44″N 130°56′27″E
- Opening date: 1923

Dam and spillways
- Height: 26.9 m (88 ft)
- Length: 233 m (764 ft)

Reservoir
- Total capacity: 1248 thousand cubic meters
- Catchment area: 2.7 sq. km
- Surface area: 13 hectares

Misaka Dam is an earthfill dam located in Yamaguchi prefecture in Japan. The dam is used for irrigation. The catchment area of the dam is 2.7 km^{2}. The dam impounds about 13 ha of land when full and can store 1248 thousand cubic meters of water. The construction of the dam was completed in 1923.
