= Imatomi Dam =

Dam in Yamaguchi Prefecture, Japan

- Location within Japan
- Interactive map of Imatomi Dam
- Location: Yamaguchi Prefecture, Japan
- Coordinates: 34°5′29″N 131°15′10″E
- Construction began: 1971
- Opening date: 1978

Dam and spillways
- Height: 35.5 m (116 ft)
- Length: 219 m (719 ft)

Reservoir
- Total capacity: 1700 thousand cubic meters
- Catchment area: 8.6 sq. km
- Surface area: 18 hectares

Imatomi Dam is a gravity dam located in Yamaguchi prefecture in Japan. The dam is used for flood control. The catchment area of the dam is 8.6 km^{2}. The dam impounds about 18 ha of land when full and can store 1700 thousand cubic meters of water. The construction of the dam was started on 1971 and completed in 1978.
