= Hatano-ike Dam =

Dam in Yamaguchi Prefecture, Japan

- Location within Japan
- Interactive map of Hatano-ike Dam
- Location: Yamaguchi Prefecture, Japan
- Coordinates: 34°0′03″N 132°4′51″E
- Opening date: 2006

Dam and spillways
- Height: 18 m (59 ft)
- Length: 63 m (207 ft)

Reservoir
- Total capacity: 270 thousand cubic meters
- Catchment area: 1.1 sq. km
- Surface area: 4 hectares

Hatano-ike Dam is an earthfill dam located in Yamaguchi prefecture in Japan. The dam is used for irrigation. The catchment area of the dam is 1.1 km^{2}. The dam impounds about 4 ha of land when full and can store 270 thousand cubic meters of water. The construction of the dam was completed in 2006.
