= Mishogawa Dam =

Dam in Yamaguchi Prefecture, Japan

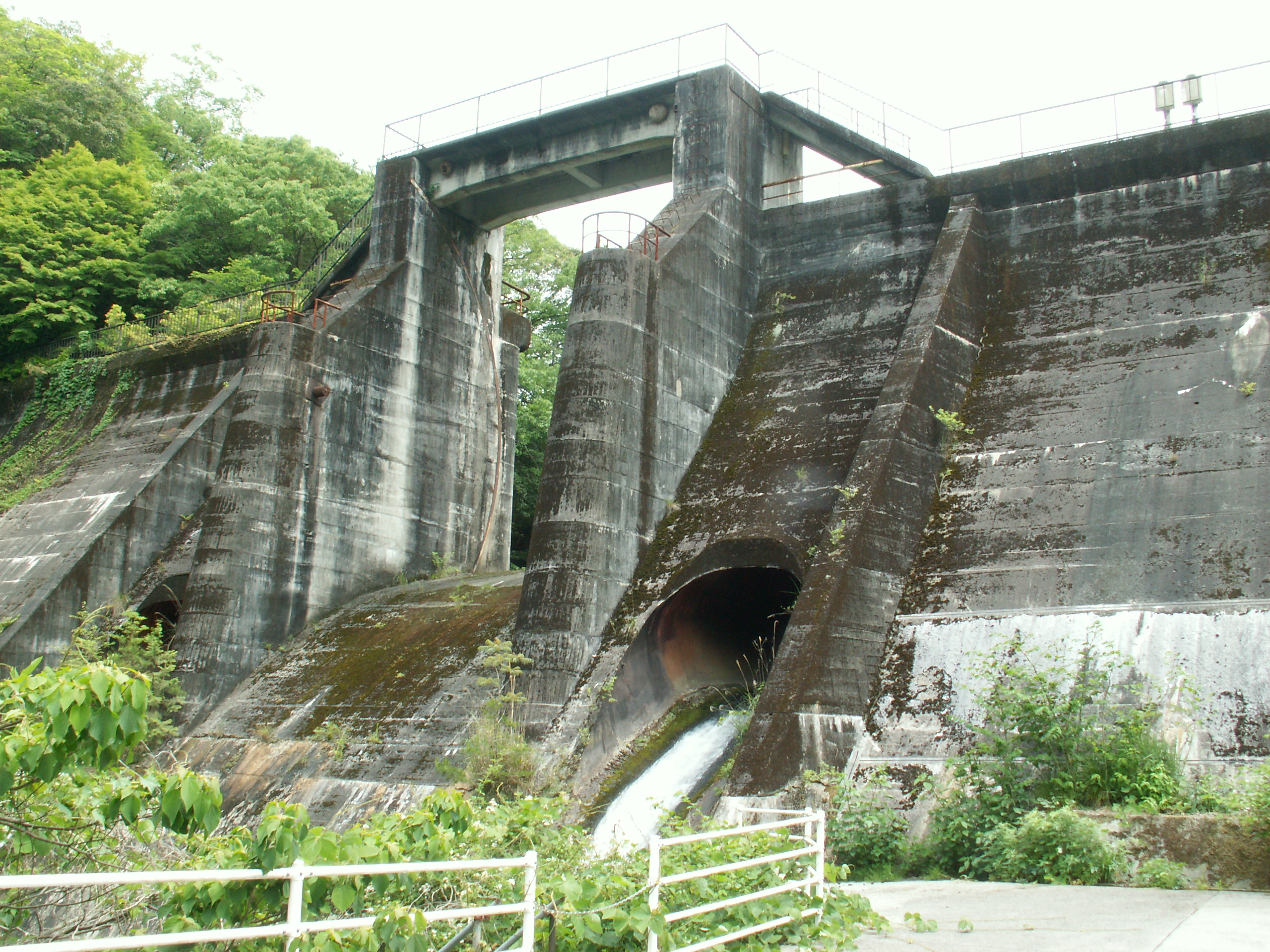
- Location: Yamaguchi Prefecture, Japan
- Coordinates: 34°7′45″N 132°9′03″E
- Opening date: 1958

Dam and spillways
- Height: 21.8m
- Length: 101.5m

Reservoir
- Total capacity: 640
- Catchment area: 21.3
- Surface area: 9 hectares

Mishogawa Dam is a concrete gravity dam located in Yamaguchi prefecture in Japan. The dam is used for flood control. The catchment area of the dam is 21.3 km^{2}. The dam impounds about 9 ha of land when full and can store 640 thousand cubic meters of water. The construction of the dam was started on and completed in 1958.
