= Yashiro Dam (Yamaguchi) =

Dam in Yamaguchi Prefecture, Japan

- Location within Japan
- Location: Yamaguchi Prefecture, Japan
- Coordinates: 33°54′31″N 132°12′58″E
- Construction began: 1972
- Opening date: 1990

Dam and spillways
- Height: 46.5 m (153 ft)
- Length: 371.7 m (1,219 ft)

Reservoir
- Total capacity: 1,550,000 m^{3} (55,000,000 cu ft)
- Catchment area: 8.1 km^{2} (3.1 sq mi)
- Surface area: 16 hectares (40 acres)

Yashiro Dam is a rockfill dam located in Yamaguchi prefecture in Japan. The dam is used for flood control. The catchment area of the dam is 8.1 km^{2}. The dam impounds about 16 ha of land when full and can store 1550 thousand cubic meters of water. The construction of the dam was started in 1972 and completed in 1990.
