= Utsui Dam =

Dam in Yamaguchi Prefecture, Japan

- Location within Japan
- Location: Yamaguchi Prefecture, Japan
- Coordinates: 34°6′16″N 130°57′24″E
- Construction began: 1975
- Opening date: 1990

Dam and spillways
- Height: 41.2 m (135 ft)
- Length: 229 m (751 ft)

Reservoir
- Total capacity: 1,260,000 m^{3} (44,000,000 cu ft)
- Catchment area: 3.2 km^{2} (1.2 sq mi)
- Surface area: 12 hectares (30 acres)

Utsui Dam is an earthfill dam located in Yamaguchi prefecture in Japan. The dam is used for irrigation. The catchment area of the dam is 3.2 km^{2}. The dam impounds about 12 ha of land when full and can store 1260 thousand cubic meters of water. The construction of the dam was started on 1975 and completed in 1990.
