= Kawakami Dam (Yamaguchi) =

Dam in Yamaguchi Prefecture, Japan

- Interactive map of Kawakami Dam
- Location: Yamaguchi Prefecture, Japan
- Coordinates: 34°6′31″N 131°47′12″E
- Construction began: 1971
- Opening date: 1979

Dam and spillways
- Height: 63m
- Length: 187.3m

Reservoir
- Total capacity: 13720
- Catchment area: 22.2
- Surface area: 62 hectares

Kawakami Dam is a concrete gravity dam located in Yamaguchi prefecture in Japan. The dam is used for water supply and irrigation. The catchment area of the dam is 22.2 km^{2}. The dam impounds about 62 ha of land when full and can store 13720 thousand cubic meters of water. The construction of the dam was started on 1971 and completed in 1979.
