= Biwanoki-ike Dam =

Dam in Yamaguchi Prefecture, Japan

Biwanoki-ike
- Location within Japan
- Interactive map of Biwanoki-ike
- Location: Yamaguchi Prefecture, Japan
- Coordinates: 34°21′55″N 131°8′33″E
- Opening date: 1962

Dam and spillways
- Height: 17.1 m (56 ft)
- Length: 63.5 m (208 ft)

Reservoir
- Total capacity: 50 thousand cubic meters
- Catchment area: 0.2 sq. km
- Surface area: 1 hectares

Biwanoki-ike is an earthfill dam located in Yamaguchi prefecture in Japan. The dam is used for irrigation. The catchment area of the dam is 0.2 km^{2}. The dam impounds about 1 ha of land when full and can store 50 thousand cubic meters of water. The construction of the dam was completed in 1962.
