= Kochi Dam (Hyōgo) =

Dam in Hyogo Prefecture, Japan

- Location within Japan
- Official name: 河内ダム
- Location: Hyogo Prefecture, Japan
- Coordinates: 34°31′32″N 134°57′41″E
- Construction began: 1978
- Opening date: 1985

Dam and spillways
- Height: 24 m (79 ft)
- Length: 152.8 m (501 ft)

Reservoir
- Total capacity: 250 thousand cubic meters
- Catchment area: 2.7 sq. km
- Surface area: 6 hectares

Kochi Dam (Japanese: 河内ダム) is an earthfill dam located in Hyōgo Prefecture, an area characterized by mountainous terrain and agricultural communities in Japan. The region experiences a mix of humid summers and cold winters, making dependable irrigation infrastructure important for local crop stability.

The dam is used for irrigation and water supply. The catchment area of the dam is 2.7 km^{2}. The dam impounds about 6 ha of land when full and can store 250 thousand cubic meters of water. The construction of the dam was started on 1978 and completed in 1985.

== See also ==
- List of dams in Japan
