= Daibo Dam =

Dam in Yamaguchi Prefecture, Japan

- Location within Japan
- Interactive map of Daibo Dam
- Location: Yamaguchi Prefecture, Japan
- Coordinates: 34°20′30″N 131°3′25″E
- Construction began: 1969
- Opening date: 1973

Dam and spillways
- Height: 43.5 m (143 ft)
- Length: 115 m (377 ft)

Reservoir
- Total capacity: 3860 thousand cubic meters
- Catchment area: 15 sq. km
- Surface area: 29 hectares

Daibo Dam is a gravity dam located in Yamaguchi prefecture in Japan. The dam is used for flood control. The catchment area of the dam is 15 km^{2}. The dam impounds about 29 ha of land when full and can store 3860 thousand cubic meters of water. The construction of the dam was started on 1969 and completed in 1973.
