= Ubakochikami Dam =

Dam in Yamaguchi Prefecture, Japan

- Location within Japan
- Location: Yamaguchi Prefecture, Japan
- Coordinates: 34°11′20″N 131°7′54″E
- Opening date: 1918

Dam and spillways
- Height: 15 m (49 ft)
- Length: 40 m (130 ft)

Reservoir
- Total capacity: 12,000 m^{3} (420,000 cu ft)
- Catchment area: 0.3 km^{2} (0.12 sq mi)
- Surface area: hectares

Ubakochikami Dam is an earthfill dam located in Yamaguchi prefecture in Japan. The dam is used for irrigation. The catchment area of the dam is 0.3 km^{2}. The dam impounds about ha of land when full and can store 12 thousand cubic meters of water. The construction of the dam was completed in 1918.
