= Hata Dam (Yamaguchi) =

Dam in Yamaguchi Prefecture, Japan

- Location within Japan
- Interactive map of Hata Dam
- Location: Yamaguchi Prefecture, Japan
- Coordinates: 34°20′50″N 131°7′15″E
- Opening date: 1971

Dam and spillways
- Height: 21 m (69 ft)
- Length: 140 m (460 ft)

Reservoir
- Total capacity: 637 thousand cubic meters
- Catchment area: 6.2 sq. km
- Surface area: 10 hectares

Hata Dam is a gravity dam located in Yamaguchi prefecture in Japan. The dam is used for irrigation. The catchment area of the dam is 6.2 km^{2}. The dam impounds about 10 ha of land when full and can store 637 thousand cubic meters of water. The construction of the dam was completed in 1971.
