= Arimune Dam =

Dam in Yamaguchi Prefecture, Japan

- Location within Japan
- Interactive map of Arimune Dam
- Location: Yamaguchi Prefecture, Japan
- Coordinates: 34°21′34″N 131°4′56″E
- Construction began: 1980
- Opening date: 1990

Dam and spillways
- Height: 28.7 m (94 ft)
- Length: 121.5 m (399 ft)

Reservoir
- Total capacity: 564 thousand cubic meters
- Catchment area: 6.3 sq. km
- Surface area: 7 hectares

Arimune Dam is a gravity dam located in Yamaguchi prefecture in Japan. The dam is used for irrigation. The catchment area of the dam is 6.3 km^{2}. The dam impounds about 7 ha of land when full and can store 564 thousand cubic meters of water. The construction of the dam was started on 1980 and completed in 1990.
