= Hirase Dam =

Dam in Yamaguchi Prefecture, Japan

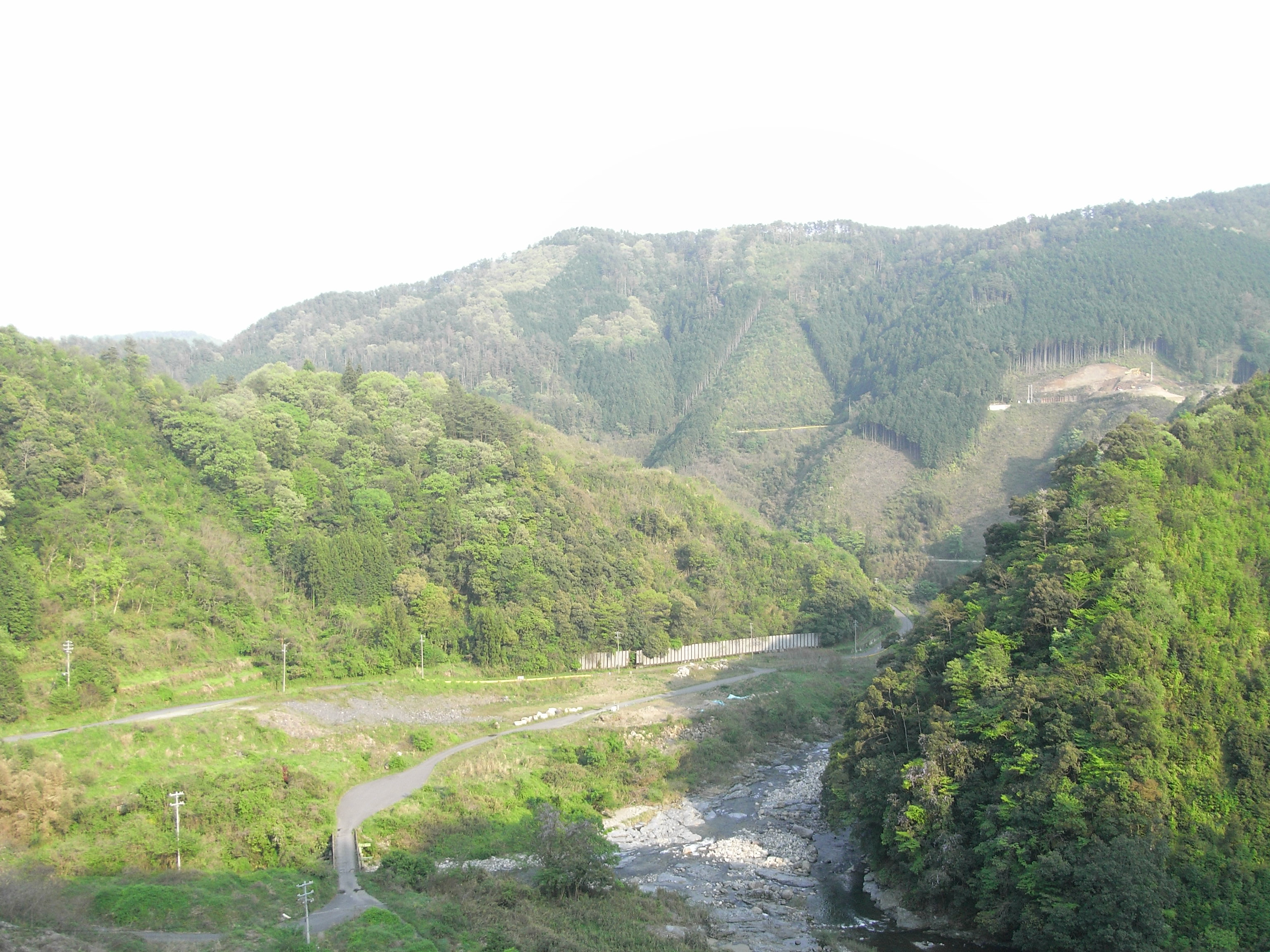

- Location within Japan
- Interactive map of Hirase Dam
- Location: Yamaguchi Prefecture, Japan
- Coordinates: 34°15′15″N 131°56′14″E
- Construction began: 1973

Dam and spillways
- Height: 73 m (240 ft)
- Length: 300 m (980 ft)

Reservoir
- Total capacity: 29500 thousand cubic meters
- Catchment area: 336.2 sq. km
- Surface area: 133 hectares

Hirase Dam is a gravity dam located in Yamaguchi prefecture in Japan. The dam is used for flood control, water supply and power production. The catchment area of the dam is 336.2 km^{2}. The dam impounds about 133 ha of land when full and can store 29500 thousand cubic meters of water. The construction of the dam was started on 1973.
