= Kamate Station =

Railway station in Matsuda, Shimane Prefecture, Japan

Kamate Station 鎌手駅
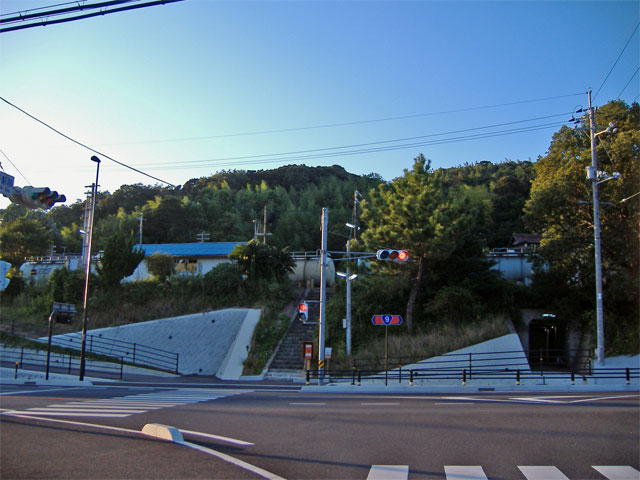
- Kamate Station, October 2007

General information
- Location: 880 Nishihirabara-chō, Masuda-shi, Shimane-ken 699-3506; Japan
- Coordinates: 34°45′6.14″N 131°52′41.88″E
- Owner: West Japan Railway Company
- Operator: West Japan Railway Company
- Line: D San'in Main Line
- Distance: 507.2 km (315.2 miles) from Kyoto
- Platforms: 2 side platforms
- Tracks: 2
- Connections: Bus stop

Construction
- Structure type: At grade

Other information
- Status: Unstaffed
- Website: Official website

History
- Opened: 26 December 1923

Passengers
- FY2020: 15

Services
Preceding station	JR West	Following station
Iwami-Tsuda towards Masuda	San'in Line	Okami towards Yonago
Location
- Location within Shimane Prefecture Location within Japan

Kamate Station (鎌手駅, Kamate-eki) is a passenger railway station located in the city of Masuda, Shimane Prefecture, Japan. It is operated by the West Japan Railway Company (JR West).

== Lines ==
Kamate Station is served by the JR West San'in Main Line, and is located 502.7 kilometers from the terminus of the line at Kyoto. Only local trains stop at this station.

== Station layout ==
The station consists of two opposed side platforms on an embankment, connected by an underground passage. The station is unattended.

== Platforms ==
1	■ D San'in Main Line	for Masuda and Shin-Yamaguchi
2	■ D San'in Main Line	for Hamada and Izumoshi

== History ==
Kamate Station was opened by the Japan Government Railways San'in Main Line when the line was extended from Miho-Misumi Station and Masuda Station on 26 December 1923. Freight operations were discontinued on 1 February 1963. With the privatization of the Japan National Railway (JNR) on 1 April 1987, the station came under the aegis of the West Japan railway Company (JR West).

== Passenger statistics ==
In fiscal 2020, the station was used by an average of 15 passengers daily.

== Surrounding area ==
- Tsuchida Beach
- Masuda City Kamate Elementary School
- Japan National Route 9

== See also ==
- List of railway stations in Japan
