= Hashi Station =

Railway station in Gōtsu, Shimane Prefecture, Japan

Hashi Station 波子駅
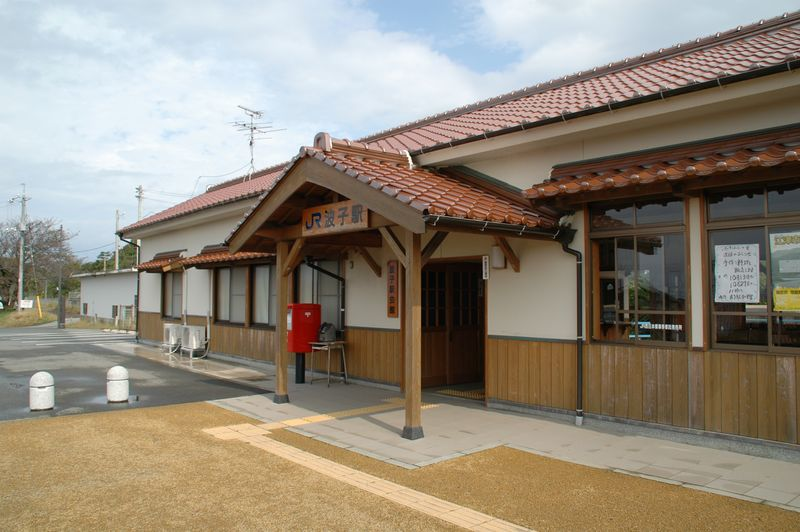
- Hashi Station, October 2005

General information
- Location: 850 Hashi-chō, Gōtsu-shi, Shimane-ken 699-3161; Japan
- Coordinates: 34°57′50.94″N 132°9′4.03″E
- Owner: West Japan Railway Company
- Operator: West Japan Railway Company
- Line: D San'in Main Line
- Distance: 463.3 km (287.9 miles) from Kyoto
- Platforms: 1 island platform
- Tracks: 2
- Connections: Bus stop

Construction
- Structure type: At grade

Other information
- Status: Unstaffed
- Website: Official website

History
- Opened: 1 September 1921

Passengers
- FY2020: 22

Services
Preceding station	JR West	Following station
Kushiro towards Masuda	San'in Line	Uyagawa towards Yonago
Location
- Location within Shimane Prefecture Location within Japan

Hashi Station (波子駅, Hashi-eki) is a passenger railway station located in the city of Gōtsu, Shimane Prefecture, Japan. It is operated by the West Japan Railway Company (JR West).

== Lines ==
Hashi Station is served by the JR West San'in Main Line, and is located 463.3 kilometers from the terminus of the line at Kyoto. Only local trains stop at this station.

== Station layout ==
The station consists of one island platform connected to the station building by a level crossing. The station is unattended.

== Platforms ==
1	■ D San'in Main Line	for Gōtsu and Ōdashi
2	■ D San'in Main Line	for Hamada and Masuda

== History ==
Hashi Station was opened on 1 September 1921 when the San'in Main Line was extended between Hamada Station and Tsunozu Station. Freight operations were discontinued on 15 June 1973. With the privatization of the Japan National Railway (JNR) on 1 April 1987, the station came under the aegis of the West Japan railway Company (JR West).

== Passenger statistics ==
In fiscal 2020, the station was used by an average of 22 passengers daily.

== Surrounding area ==
- Shimane Prefectural Shimane Ocean Museum Aquas
- Shimane Prefectural Iwami Seaside Park
- Japan National Route 9

== See also ==
- List of railway stations in Japan
