= Iwami Kokubun-ji =

Buddhist temple in Hamada, Shimane, Japan

Coordinates: 34°56′37.1″N 132°07′06.3″E

- 石見国分寺 (Japanese)
- Location within Shimane Prefecture Location within Japan
- Type: Buddhist temple ruins
- Location: 1527 Kokubuncho, Hamada-shi, Shimane-ken 697-0003

History
- Founder: Emperor Shōmu
- Built: c.741 AD
- National Historic Site of Japan

The Iwami Kokubun-ji (石見国分寺) was a Buddhist temple located in what is now the Kokubu neighborhood of the city of Hamada, Shimane, in the San'in region of Japan. It was one of the provincial temples per the system established by Emperor Shōmu during the Nara period (710 – 794) for the purpose of promoting Buddhism as the national religion of Japan and standardising imperial rule over the provinces. The temple no longer exists, and the site overlaps with that of existing and the more recent Jōdo Shinshū temple of Konzō-ji (金蔵寺), but a portion of the Nara-period temple grounds were designated as a National Historic Site in 1974.

== History ==
The Shoku Nihongi records that in 741 AD, as the country recovered from a major smallpox epidemic, Emperor Shōmu ordered that a state-subsidized monastery and nunnery be established in every province for the promotion of Buddhism and to enhance political unification per the new ritsuryō system. These were the kokubunji (国分寺). The temples were constructed per a more-or-less standardized template, and were each to be staffed by twenty clerics who would pray for the state's protection. The associated provincial nunneries (kokubunniji) were on a smaller scale, each housing ten nuns to pray for the atonement of sins. This system declined when the capital was moved from Nara to Kyoto in 794 AD.

The Iwami Kokubun-ji is located on a 54-meter-high hill that juts out towards the coast of the Sea of Japan. As the site has not been fully excavated, details of the temple layout and extent of its precincts are still unclear. The traces of an earthen altar and foundation stones remain on the southeast side of the current main hall of Konzō-ji, and are believed to be the remains of a pagoda. This was excavated in 1985, and it is believed that the tower was eight meters square, and was built in a foundation platform that was 12 by 14 meters. In 1988, a portion of a Hakuhō period bronze statue of the infant Buddha, was excavated from near this site. The statue was damaged by a fire and lacks a head or arms, but is the first Buddha statue to have been excavated from the ruins of a kokubunji temple. Radiocarbon dating of charcoal found near the statue indicates that the temple may have been destroyed by fire in the late Heian period. A large number of roof tiles have also been excavated, and they have the same pattern as the roof tiles excavated from the nearby ruins of Iwami Kokubun-niji Nunnery (which is outside the National Historic Site designation). In addition, roof tiles similar to those of the Hōki Kokunbun-ji ruins and roof tiles of the Silla-style have also been found.

The site is about a 20-minute walk from Shimokō Station on the JR West San'in Main Line.

== See also ==
- List of Historic Sites of Japan (Shimane)
- provincial temple
