= Iwami-Tsuda Station =

Railway station in Matsuda, Shimane Prefecture, Japan

Iwami-Tsuda Station 石見津田駅
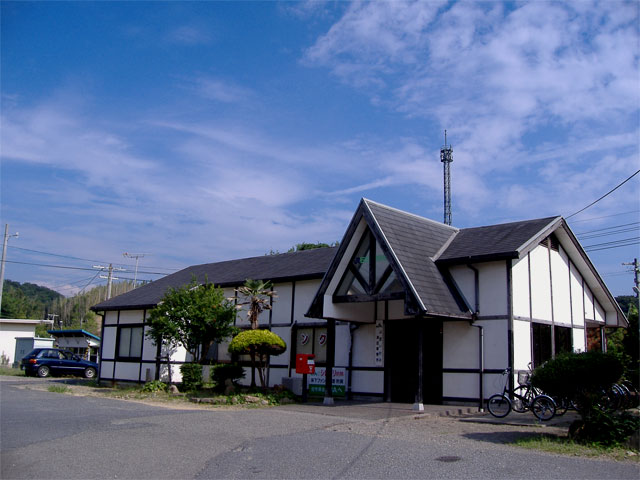
- Iwami-Tsuda Station, August 2005

General information
- Location: 1270 Tsuda-chō, Masuda-shi, Shimane-ken 699-3671; Japan
- Coordinates: 34°43′21.82″N 131°51′52.59″E
- Owner: West Japan Railway Company
- Operator: West Japan Railway Company
- Line: D San'in Main Line
- Distance: 507.2 km (315.2 miles) from Kyoto
- Platforms: 2 side platforms
- Tracks: 2
- Connections: Bus stop

Construction
- Structure type: At grade

Other information
- Status: Unstaffed
- Website: Official website

History
- Opened: 26 December 1923

Passengers
- FY2020: 14

Services
| Preceding station | JR West | Following station |
|---|---|---|
| Masuda Terminus | San'in Line | Kamate towards Yonago |
Location
- Location within Shimane Prefecture Location within Japan

Iwami-Tsuda Station (石見津田駅, Iwami-Tsuda-eki) is a passenger railway station located in the city of Masuda, Shimane Prefecture, Japan. It is operated by the West Japan Railway Company (JR West).

== Lines ==
Iwami-Tsuda Station is served by the JR West San'in Main Line, and is located 507.2 kilometers from the terminus of the line at Kyoto. Only local trains stop at this station.

== Station layout ==
The station consists of two opposed side platforms connected by a footbridge. The station building still exists, but used as a bakery and offices for the local JA office. The station is unattended.

== Platforms ==
| 1 | ■ D San'in Main Line | for Hamada and Gōtsu |
| 2 | ■ D San'in Main Line | for Masuda and Higashi-Hagi |

== History ==
Iwami-Tsuda Station was opened as a terminal station of the Japan Government Railways San'in Main Line when the line was extended from Miho-Misumi Station and Masuda Station on 26 December 1923. Freight operations were discontinued on 1 February 1963. With the privatization of the Japan National Railway (JNR) on 1 April 1987, the station came under the aegis of the West Japan railway Company (JR West).

== Passenger statistics ==
In fiscal 2020, the station was used by an average of 14 passengers daily.

== Surrounding area ==
- Tsuda Beach
- Japan National Route 9

== See also ==
- List of railway stations in Japan
