= Sufu Kofun =

Ancient tomb in Hamada, Japan

- 周布古墳 (Japanese)
- Sufu Sufu Kofun (Japan)
- Interactive map of Sufu Kofun
- 34°51′18″N 132°01′05″E
- Type: Kofun
- Periods: Kofun period
- Location: Hamada, Shimane, Japan
- Region: San'in region

History
- Built: c.5th century

Site notes
- Public access: Yes (no facilities)

Sufu Kofun (周布古墳) is a Kofun period keyhole-shaped burial mound, located in the Jiwa neighborhood of the city of Hamada, Shimane in the San'in region of Japan. The tumulus was designated a National Historic Site of Japan in 1936. It is the second largest kofun in the Iwami region.

== Overview ==
The Sufu Kofun is a zenpō-kōen-fun (前方後円墳), which is shaped like a keyhole, having one square end and one circular end, when viewed from above. It is located in a hilly area at an elevation of about 40 meters overlooking the Sufu Plain and the Sea of Japan. It used to be called 'Hisagozuka' or 'Onguro'. There was formerly another tumulus called "Menguro Kofun" about 170 meters north of the Sufu Kofun, but it was destroyed due to the development of paddy fields. The Sufu Kofun is about 65 meters long. Its posterior circular portion has a diameter of 42 meters and height of six meters and its anterior rectangular portion has a width of 25 meters and height of five meters. Portions of the antierior portion have been cut away due to the encroachment of residential development despite its protected status; but if intact the total length would have been about 69 meters. Many fist-sized river stones used as fukiishi remain on the slope, and fragments of cylindrical haniwa and Sue ware can also be seen. From these artifacts, is thought that the tumulus was constructed at the end of the middle Kofun period (around the latter half of the 5th century).

The tumulus is located about five minutes on foot from Sufu Station on the JR West San'in Main Line.

== See also ==
- List of Historic Sites of Japan (Shimane)
