= Okami Station =

Railway station in Hamada, Shimane Prefecture, Japan

Okami Station 岡見駅
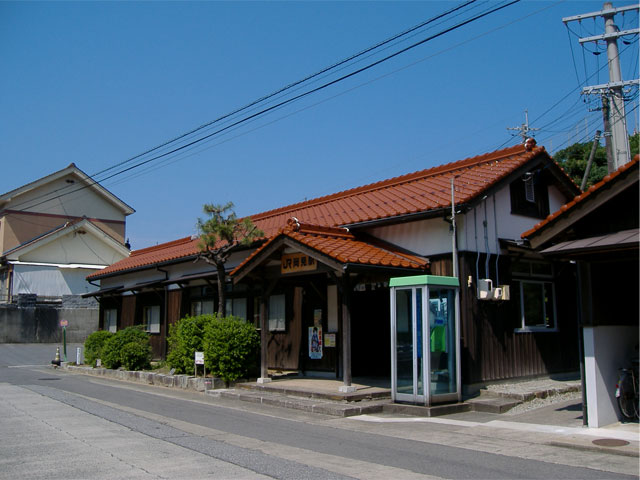
- Okami Station, September 2009

General information
- Location: 2110 Misumi-chō Okami, Hamada-shi, Shimane-ken 699-3226; Japan
- Coordinates: 34°46′18.46″N 131°54′47.57″E
- Owner: West Japan Railway Company
- Operator: West Japan Railway Company
- Line: D San'in Main Line
- Distance: 497.6 km (309.2 miles) from Kyoto
- Platforms: 1 island platform
- Tracks: 2
- Connections: Bus stop

Construction
- Structure type: At grade

Other information
- Status: Unstaffed
- Website: Official website

History
- Opened: 1 April 1926

Passengers
- FY2020: 30

Services
Preceding station	JR West	Following station
Kamate towards Masuda	San'in Line	Miho-Misumi towards Yonago
Location
- Location within Shimane Prefecture Location within Japan

Okami Station (岡見駅, Okami-eki) is a passenger railway station located in the city of Hamada, Shimane Prefecture, Japan. It is operated by the West Japan Railway Company (JR West).

== Lines ==
Okami Station is served by the JR West San'in Main Line, and is located 497.6 kilometers from the terminus of the line at Kyoto. Only local trains stop at this station.

== Station layout ==
The station is located on an embankment with a curving island platform. The station building is located on the south side of the premises, and is connected to the platform by an underground passage. The station is unattended.

== Platforms ==
1	■ D San'in Main Line	for Masuda and Shin-Yamaguchi
2	■ D San'in Main Line	for Hamada and Izumoshi

== History ==
Okami Station was opened on 1 April 1926. Freight operations were discontinued on 1 February 1963. With the privatization of the Japan National Railway (JNR) on 1 April 1987, the station came under the aegis of the West Japan railway Company (JR West). Freight operations resumed on 1 April 1998 but were abolished again on 1 April 2014.

== Passenger statistics ==
In fiscal 2020, the station was used by an average of 30 passengers daily.

== Surrounding area ==
- Chugoku Electric Misumi Thermal Power Station

== See also ==
- List of railway stations in Japan
