= Kushiro Station =

Kushiro Station can refer to two different train stations in Japan:

- Kushiro Station (Hokkaido) (釧路駅), on the Nemuro Main Line located in Kushiro, Hokkaido, Japan
- Kushiro Station (Shimane) (久代駅), on the Sanin Main Line located in Hamada, Shimane, Japan
