= Orii Station =

Railway station in Hamada, Shimane Prefecture, Japan

Orii Station 折居駅
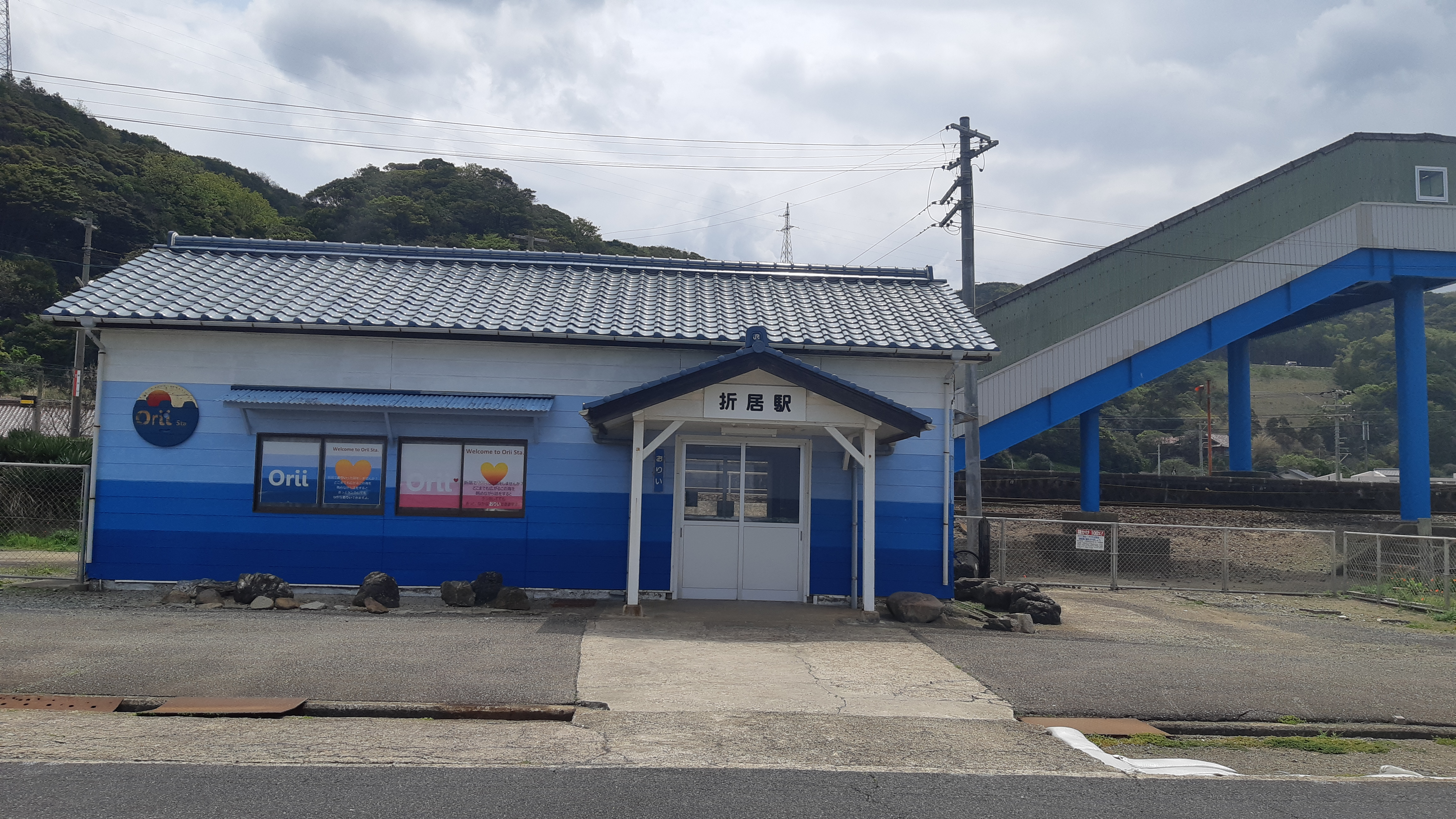
- Orii Station, April 2021

General information
- Location: 1067, Nishimura-chō, Hamada-shi, Shimane-ken 697-1337; Japan
- Coordinates: 34°49′35.03″N 131°59′12.84″E
- Owner: West Japan Railway Company
- Operator: West Japan Railway Company
- Line: D San'in Main Line
- Distance: 487.6 km (303.0 miles) from Kyoto
- Platforms: 1 island platform
- Tracks: 2
- Connections: Bus stop

Construction
- Structure type: At grade

Other information
- Status: Unstaffed
- Website: Official website

History
- Opened: 1 April 1924

Passengers
- FY2020: 6

Services
Preceding station	JR West	Following station
Miho-Misumi towards Masuda	San'in Line	Sufu towards Yonago
Location
- Location within Shimane Prefecture Location within Japan

Orii Station (折居駅, Orii-eki) is a passenger railway station located in the city of Hamada, Shimane Prefecture, Japan. It is operated by the West Japan Railway Company (JR West).

== Lines ==
Orii Station is served by the JR West San'in Main Line, and is located 487.6 kilometers from the terminus of the line at Kyoto. Only local trains stop at this station.

== Station layout ==
The station has a single island platform and a side track for track maintenance. In 2019, the outer wall of the station building was repainted with an image of the sea and sky. The station building is connected to the platform by a footbridge, and the platform has a waiting room. The station is unattended.

== Platforms ==
1	■ D San'in Main Line	for Hamada and Izumoshi
2	■ D San'in Main Line	for Masuda and Shin-Yamaguchi

== History ==
Orii Station was opened on 1 April 1924. Freight operations were discontinued on 1 October 1962. With the privatization of the Japan National Railway (JNR) on 1 April 1987, the station came under the aegis of the West Japan railway Company (JR West).

== Passenger statistics ==
In fiscal 2020, the station was used by an average of 6 passengers daily.

== Surrounding area ==
- Orii Beach
- Japan National Route 9

== See also ==
- List of railway stations in Japan
