= Hamada, Shimane =

Hamada 浜田市
- City
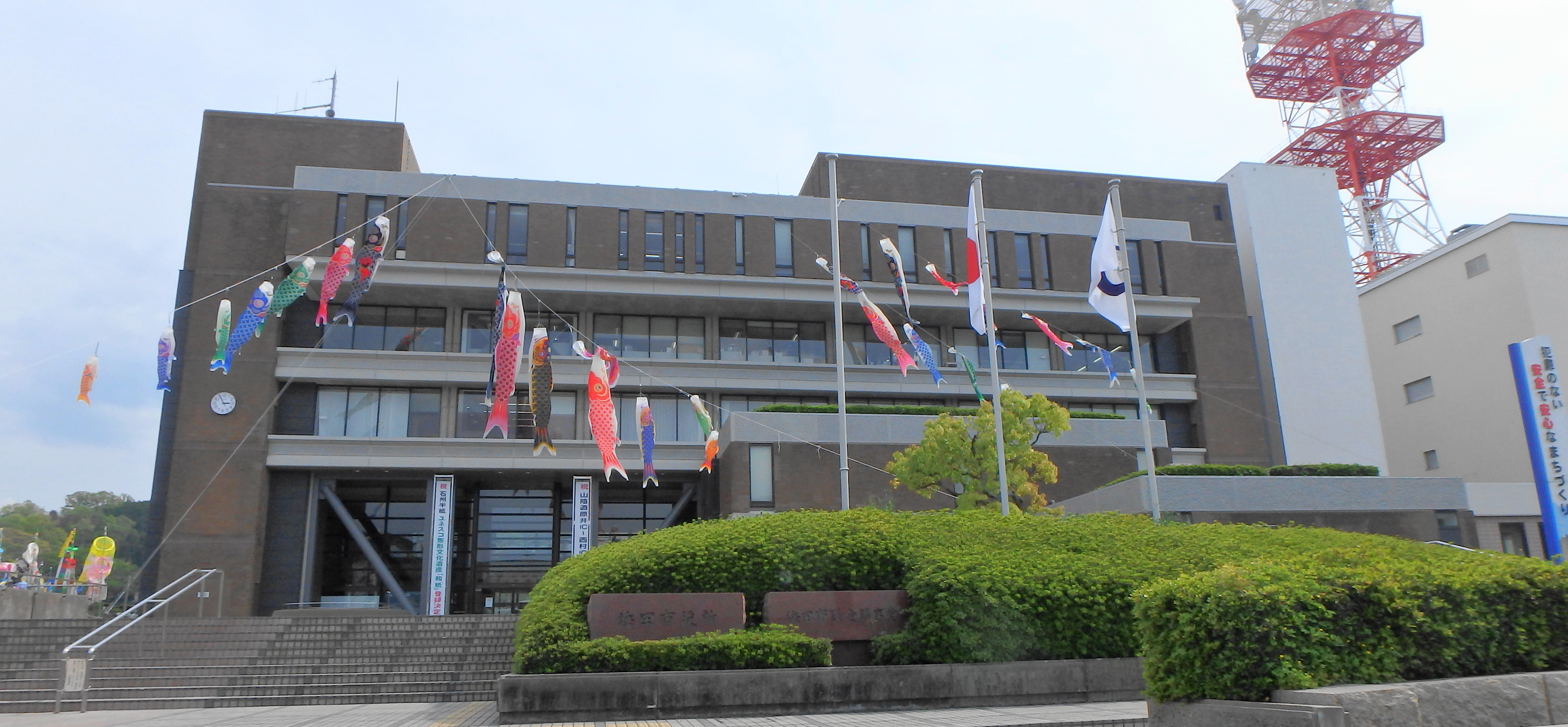
- Hamada City Hall

- Flag Emblem
- Interactive map of Hamada
- Location in Japan
- Coordinates: 34°53′57″N 132°5′47″E
- Country: Japan
- Region: Chūgoku (San'in)
- Prefecture: Shimane
- Town settled: April 1, 1889
- City Settled: November 3, 1940

Government
  - Mayor: Hiroki Miura (三浦大紀) - from October 2025

Area
  - Total: 689.68 km^{2} (266.29 sq mi)

Population (May 31, 2023)
  - Total: 50,176
  - Density: 72.753/km^{2} (188.43/sq mi)
- Time zone: UTC+09:00 (JST)
- City hall address: 1 Tonomachi, Hamada-shi, Shimane-ken; 697-8501
- Climate: Cfa
- Website: Official website
- Symbols
- Fish: Blackthroat seaperch
- Flower: Azalea
- Tree: Cherry

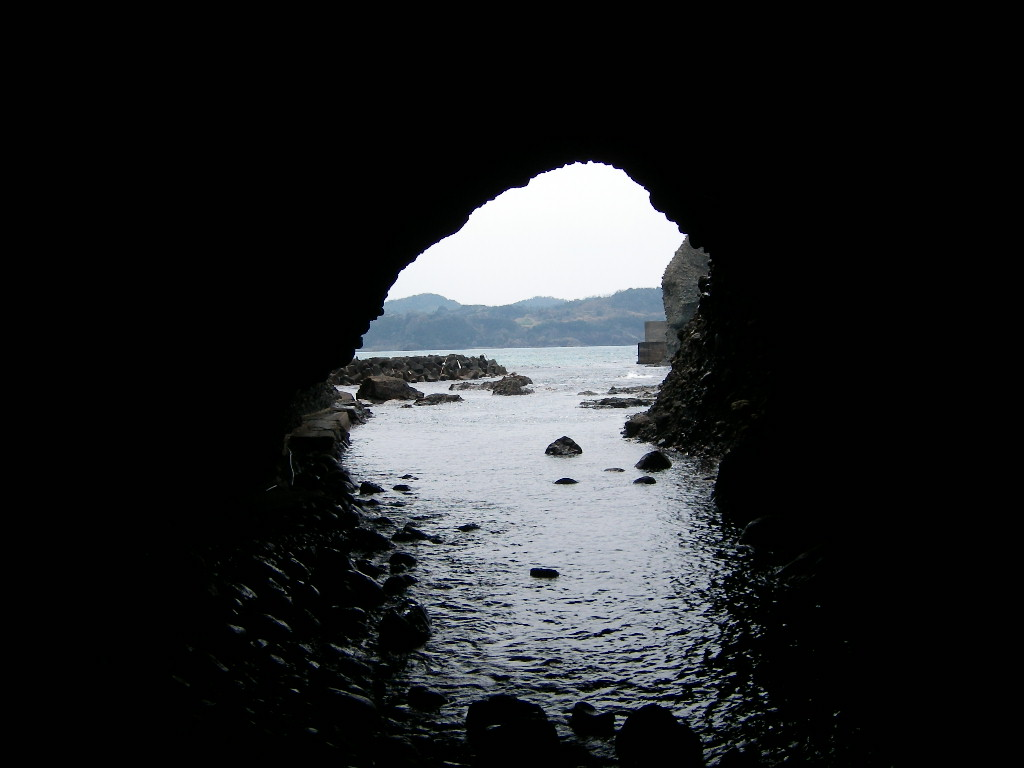
Iwami Tatami-ga-ura

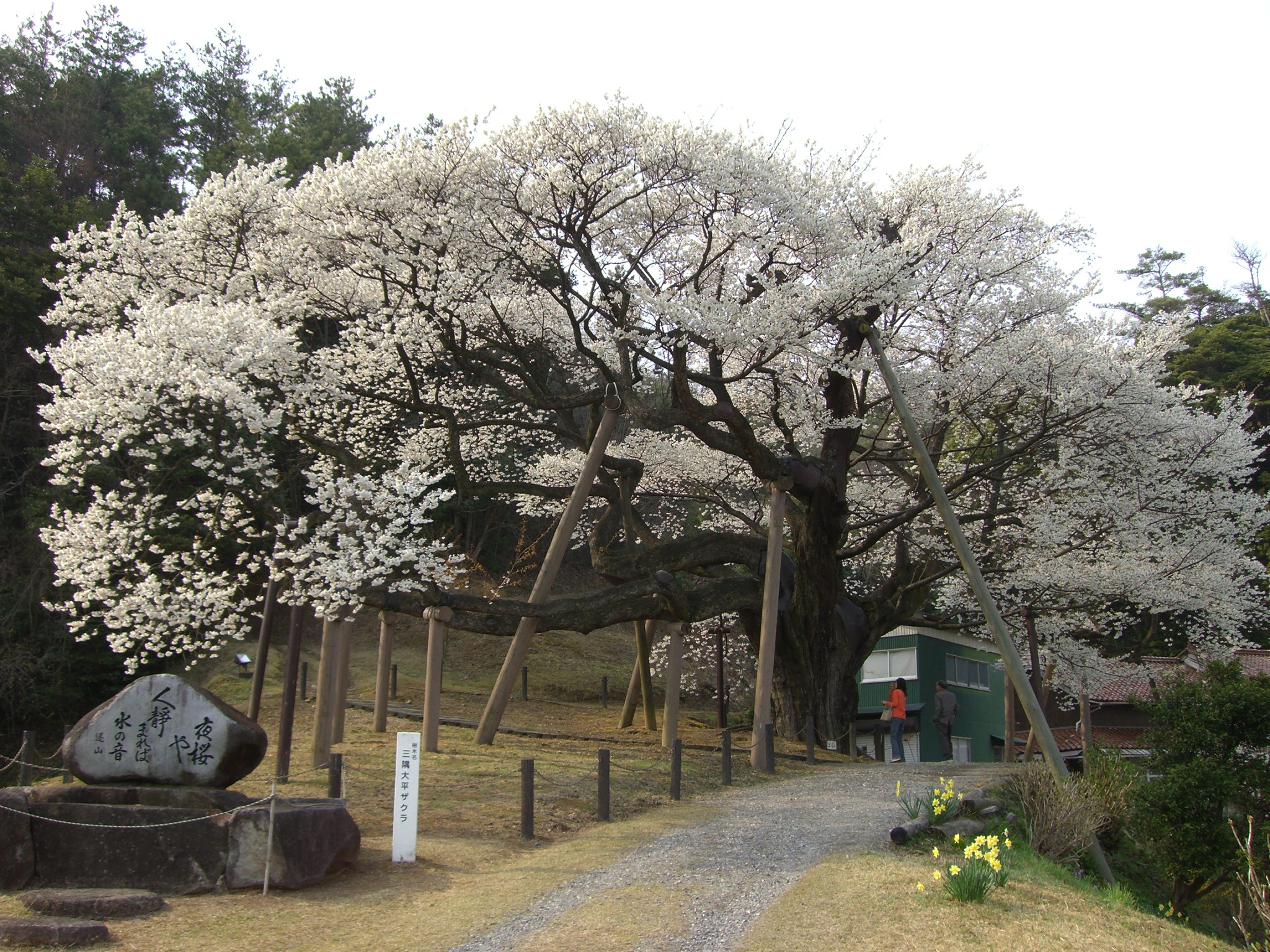
Approx. 600-year-old cherry tree in Misumi. An area of western Hamada.

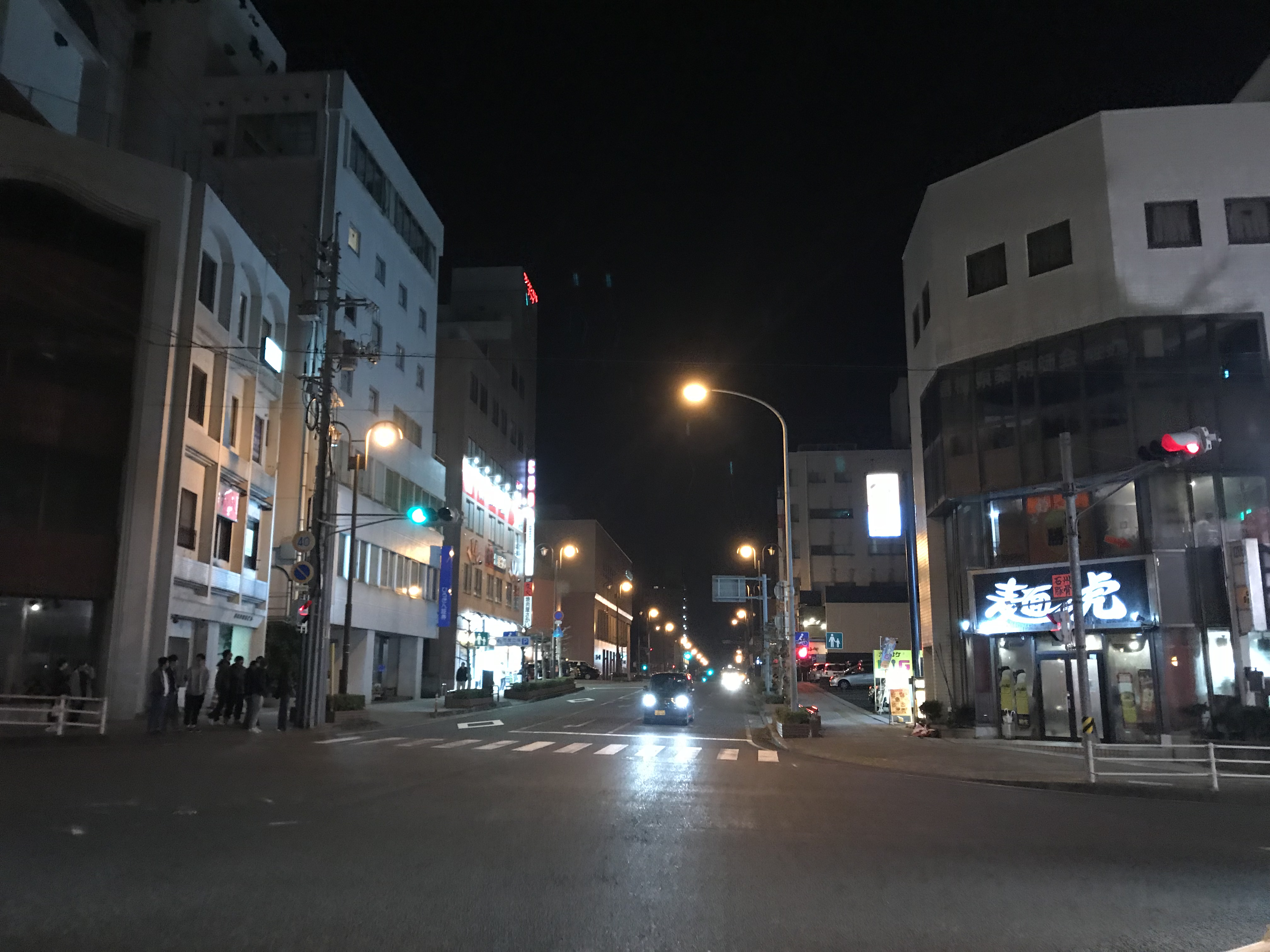
Downtown of Hamada city

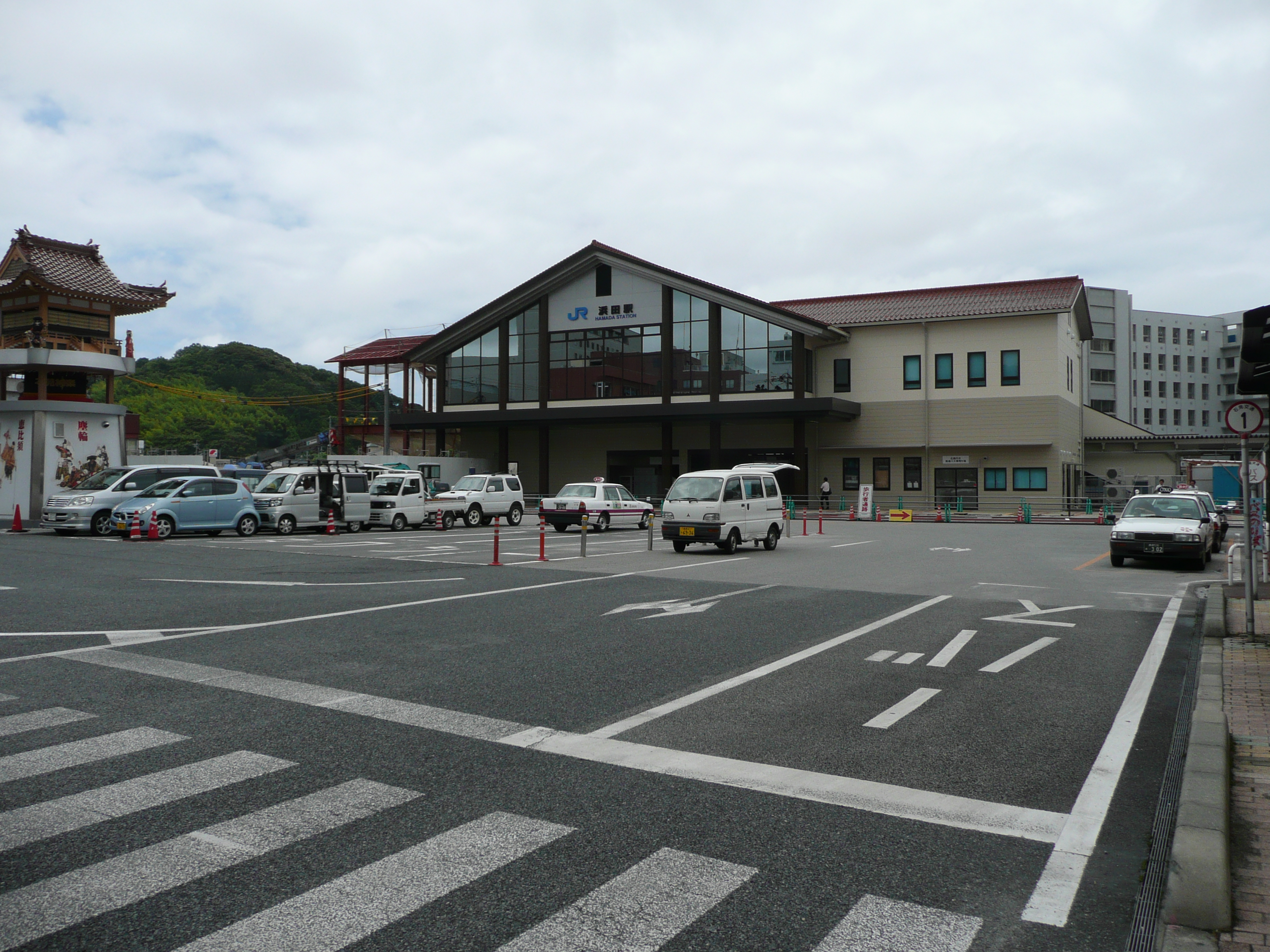
Hamada Station

Hamada (浜田市, Hamada-shi) is a city located in Shimane Prefecture, Japan. As of 31 May 2023, the city had an estimated population of 50,176 in 25498 households and a population density of 73 persons per km^{2}. The total area of the city is 689.68 square kilometres (266.29 sq mi).

== Geography ==
Hamada is located in central Shimane, facing the Sea of Japan to the north and the Chugoku Mountains to the south.

== Neighboring municipalities ==
Hiroshima Prefecture

- Kitahiroshima

Shimane Prefecture

- Gōtsu
- Masuda
- Ōnan

=== Climate ===
Hamada has a humid subtropical climate (Köppen climate classification Cfa). It experiences a wide range in temperature between summer and winter but due to its location it is saved from the extreme winter cold in the north and prolonged summer heat in the south. In summer the temperature gets as high as 38 °C (100 °F) with high humidity and in winter it can drop to −5 °C (23 °F). The coastal main city of Hamada occasionally gets snowfall in the winter. The mountainous areas of Hamada inland to the east receive high levels of snowfall and are home to some of the best ski resorts in the area. Late spring/early summer is the rainy season with frequent light showers throughout the day. Spring and Autumn in Hamada provide warm, sunny weather with a very comfortable temperature.

Due to its location on the western seaboard of Japan, Hamada is relatively free from weather extremes such as typhoons or flooding. Hamada is also not located near a fault line and the occurrence of strong earthquakes in Shimane is rare with the exception of the 1872 Hamada Earthquake.

Climate data for Hamada (1991−2020 normals, extremes 1893−present)
Month	Jan	Feb	Mar	Apr	May	Jun	Jul	Aug	Sep	Oct	Nov	Dec	Year
Record high °C (°F)	23.3 (73.9)	25.5 (77.9)	28.6 (83.5)	30.4 (86.7)	31.1 (88.0)	33.9 (93.0)	36.9 (98.4)	39.0 (102.2)	36.5 (97.7)	32.4 (90.3)	28.0 (82.4)	25.8 (78.4)	39.0 (102.2)
Mean maximum °C (°F)	15.5 (59.9)	17.9 (64.2)	21.2 (70.2)	25.2 (77.4)	28.4 (83.1)	30.5 (86.9)	33.5 (92.3)	35.1 (95.2)	31.9 (89.4)	27.7 (81.9)	23.3 (73.9)	18.1 (64.6)	35.3 (95.5)
Mean daily maximum °C (°F)	9.4 (48.9)	10.3 (50.5)	13.3 (55.9)	18.0 (64.4)	22.3 (72.1)	25.2 (77.4)	28.9 (84.0)	30.6 (87.1)	26.8 (80.2)	22.1 (71.8)	17.2 (63.0)	12.0 (53.6)	19.7 (67.4)
Daily mean °C (°F)	6.2 (43.2)	6.5 (43.7)	9.0 (48.2)	13.5 (56.3)	17.9 (64.2)	21.4 (70.5)	25.6 (78.1)	26.8 (80.2)	22.8 (73.0)	17.7 (63.9)	13.1 (55.6)	8.5 (47.3)	15.7 (60.4)
Mean daily minimum °C (°F)	3.0 (37.4)	2.8 (37.0)	4.7 (40.5)	8.9 (48.0)	13.5 (56.3)	18.0 (64.4)	22.6 (72.7)	23.5 (74.3)	19.3 (66.7)	13.7 (56.7)	9.2 (48.6)	5.2 (41.4)	12.0 (53.7)
Mean minimum °C (°F)	−1.5 (29.3)	−1.3 (29.7)	−0.1 (31.8)	2.6 (36.7)	8.0 (46.4)	13.1 (55.6)	18.5 (65.3)	19.5 (67.1)	14.2 (57.6)	8.7 (47.7)	4.3 (39.7)	0.8 (33.4)	−2.4 (27.7)
Record low °C (°F)	−6.8 (19.8)	−7.6 (18.3)	−4.3 (24.3)	−0.9 (30.4)	1.4 (34.5)	5.9 (42.6)	11.0 (51.8)	14.6 (58.3)	8.4 (47.1)	3.8 (38.8)	−0.3 (31.5)	−4.9 (23.2)	−7.6 (18.3)
Average precipitation mm (inches)	97.8 (3.85)	82.5 (3.25)	122.1 (4.81)	116.2 (4.57)	136.7 (5.38)	185.3 (7.30)	239.7 (9.44)	150.9 (5.94)	192.2 (7.57)	111.3 (4.38)	105.5 (4.15)	114.5 (4.51)	1,654.6 (65.14)
Average snowfall cm (inches)	5 (2.0)	4 (1.6)	trace	0 (0)	0 (0)	0 (0)	0 (0)	0 (0)	0 (0)	0 (0)	0 (0)	1 (0.4)	10 (3.9)
Average precipitation days (≥ 1.0 mm)	13.1	11.5	11.9	9.7	9.3	10.7	11.0	9.0	10.4	9.0	9.9	12.9	128.4
Average snowy days (≥ 1 cm)	1.1	1.1	0.1	0	0	0	0	0	0	0	0	0.4	2.7
Average relative humidity (%)	66	66	68	69	73	81	82	79	80	74	69	66	73
Mean monthly sunshine hours	64.2	89.3	147.0	183.7	206.6	158.6	181.5	213.5	161.8	164.0	117.7	73.2	1,761.3
Source: Japan Meteorological Agency

Climate data for Yasaka, Hamada (1991−2020 normals, extremes 1978−present)
Month	Jan	Feb	Mar	Apr	May	Jun	Jul	Aug	Sep	Oct	Nov	Dec	Year
Record high °C (°F)	18.2 (64.8)	22.0 (71.6)	26.5 (79.7)	29.5 (85.1)	30.9 (87.6)	33.9 (93.0)	35.9 (96.6)	36.0 (96.8)	34.6 (94.3)	30.9 (87.6)	24.9 (76.8)	22.5 (72.5)	36.0 (96.8)
Mean daily maximum °C (°F)	5.6 (42.1)	7.1 (44.8)	11.3 (52.3)	17.3 (63.1)	22.2 (72.0)	24.9 (76.8)	28.2 (82.8)	29.5 (85.1)	25.1 (77.2)	19.8 (67.6)	14.4 (57.9)	8.3 (46.9)	17.8 (64.1)
Daily mean °C (°F)	1.6 (34.9)	2.2 (36.0)	5.4 (41.7)	10.7 (51.3)	15.7 (60.3)	19.5 (67.1)	23.5 (74.3)	24.2 (75.6)	19.8 (67.6)	13.9 (57.0)	8.7 (47.7)	3.7 (38.7)	12.4 (54.4)
Mean daily minimum °C (°F)	−2.2 (28.0)	−2.4 (27.7)	−0.3 (31.5)	4.0 (39.2)	9.1 (48.4)	14.6 (58.3)	19.6 (67.3)	19.9 (67.8)	15.4 (59.7)	8.5 (47.3)	3.3 (37.9)	−0.5 (31.1)	7.4 (45.4)
Record low °C (°F)	−13.2 (8.2)	−16.3 (2.7)	−10.7 (12.7)	−5.3 (22.5)	−1.2 (29.8)	3.1 (37.6)	7.0 (44.6)	11.7 (53.1)	2.8 (37.0)	−1.5 (29.3)	−4.6 (23.7)	−10.4 (13.3)	−16.3 (2.7)
Average precipitation mm (inches)	168.8 (6.65)	133.4 (5.25)	158.7 (6.25)	136.5 (5.37)	156.5 (6.16)	222.9 (8.78)	298.5 (11.75)	193.0 (7.60)	222.6 (8.76)	138.8 (5.46)	134.6 (5.30)	185.6 (7.31)	2,144.6 (84.43)
Average snowfall cm (inches)	94 (37)	74 (29)	18 (7.1)	0 (0)	0 (0)	0 (0)	0 (0)	0 (0)	0 (0)	0 (0)	1 (0.4)	40 (16)	227 (89)
Average precipitation days (≥ 1.0 mm)	17.8	15.0	14.9	11.4	10.5	12.6	12.7	11.0	11.2	10.2	12.5	17.1	156.9
Average snowy days (≥ 3 cm)	9.5	7.8	1.8	0	0	0	0	0	0	0	0.1	3.8	23
Mean monthly sunshine hours	54.3	79.1	132.6	181.4	203.4	139.6	151.8	176.8	138.7	148.5	108.2	64.6	1,573.3
Source: Japan Meteorological Agency

=== Demographics ===
Per Japanese census data, the population of Hamada in 2020 was 54,592 people. Hamada has been conducting censuses since 1920.

Historical population
Year	Pop.	±%
1960	89,472	—
1965	79,822	−10.8%
1970	73,592	−7.8%
1975	72,253	−1.8%
1980	72,130	−0.2%
1985	72,529	+0.6%
1990	69,411	−4.3%
1995	68,103	−1.9%
2000	65,463	−3.9%
2005	63,046	−3.7%
2010	61,728	−2.1%
2015	58,105	−5.9%
2020	54,592	−6.0%
Hamada population statistics

== History ==
The area of Hamada was the center of ancient Iwami Province, and the ruins of the Iwami Kokubun-ji are located within the city. During the Edo Period, the area was mostly under the control of Hamada Domain, which was ruled mostly by various branches of the Matsudaira clan under the Tokugawa shogunate. It was a stronghold of pro-shogunate support during the Bakumatsu period. After the Meiji restoration, the town of Hamada was established on April 1, 1889 with the creation of the modern municipalities system. The city was founded on November 3, 1940 by the merger of Hamada with the villages of Iwami, Nagahama, Mikawa and Sufu. On October 1, 2005, the towns of Asahi, Kanagi and Misumi, and the village of Yasaka (all from Naka District) were merged into Hamada. Therefore, Naka District was dissolved as a result of this merger.

== Government ==
Hamada has a mayor-council form of government with a directly elected mayor and a unicameral city council of 22 members. Masuda contributes three members to the Shimane Prefectural Assembly. In terms of national politics, the city is part of the Shimane 2nd district of the lower house of the Diet of Japan.

== Economy ==
Hamada has a diverse economy, with commercial fishing, agriculture, light manufacturing and commerce predominating.

== Education ==
Hamada has 16 public elementary school and nine public junior high schools operated by the city government, and three public high schools operated by the Shimane Prefectural Board of Education. The prefecture operates two special education schools for the handicapped. The prefectural University of Shimane is located in Hamada.

== Transportation ==
=== Railway ===
JR West (JR West) - San'in Main Line

- Okami - Miho-Misumi - Orii - Sufu - Nishi-Hamada - Hamada - Shimokō - Kushiro

=== Highways ===
- Hamada Expressway
- San'in Expressway
- National Route 9
- National Route 186

=== Ports ===
- Port of Hamada, Hamada is one of the few cities in the region to possess a heavy tonnage shipping port. The Hamada commercial port can accept vessels up to a maximum of 50,000 tonnes deadweight (DWT).^{1}

=== Air ===
The city does not have its airport. The nearest airports are:

- Iwami Airport, located 44 km (27 mi) west of Hamada. However, the airport only provides one daily flight to Tokyo Haneda Airport which is operated by ANA Airways.
- Hiroshima Airport, located 140 km (87 mi) south east. The airport provides direct international routes to China, South Korea, Taiwan and Vietnam.

== Sister cities ==
- Ningxia, China
- Rongcheng, Shandong, China

== Local attractions ==
=== Sights ===
- Aquas is on the outskirts of the city. It is the largest aquarium in western Honshū.
- The Hamada Museum of Children's Art is located about one mile from the city center. Its exhibits include artwork by children from around the world and artwork of interest to children. Their programs include technical art classes and art history workshops for children of all ages.
- The ruins of Hamada Castle are situated on the top of a hill near the centre of town. From the top of the ruins, visitors can see extensive views of Hamada city and the coast.
- Iwami Seaside Park is a large beach located near Aquas with cabins, barbecue areas, and rental facilities.
- Sufu Kofun, National Historic Site

== Culture ==
=== Yearly festivals ===
Month	Festival description
January	No events
February	Izumo Taisha Iwami-bunshi Setsubun Festival
March	Tadaji Hatsuuma Festival (one of the largest festivals in the Iwami area)
April	Hamakko Spring Festival Daimyo Parade (and many other kinds of parades)
May	No events
June	No events
July	Kokubu Kinsai Festival
August	Hamakko Summer Festival (Largest event of the year, with a huge fireworks display in the evening at the port) Nagahama Hassakuhana Festival (Fire Protection Festival)
September	No events
October	Nagahama Tenjinreitai Festival (Festival of the God of the Sea)
November	Hamada BB Onabe Festival Iwami Kagura Festival
December	No events

== Notable people from Hamada ==
- Meiji Hashimoto, Nihonga painter
- Shigeo Ōdachi, politician
- Magoichi Tawara, politician
