= Shimokō Station =

Railway station in Hamada, Shimane Prefecture, Japan

Shimokō Station 下府駅
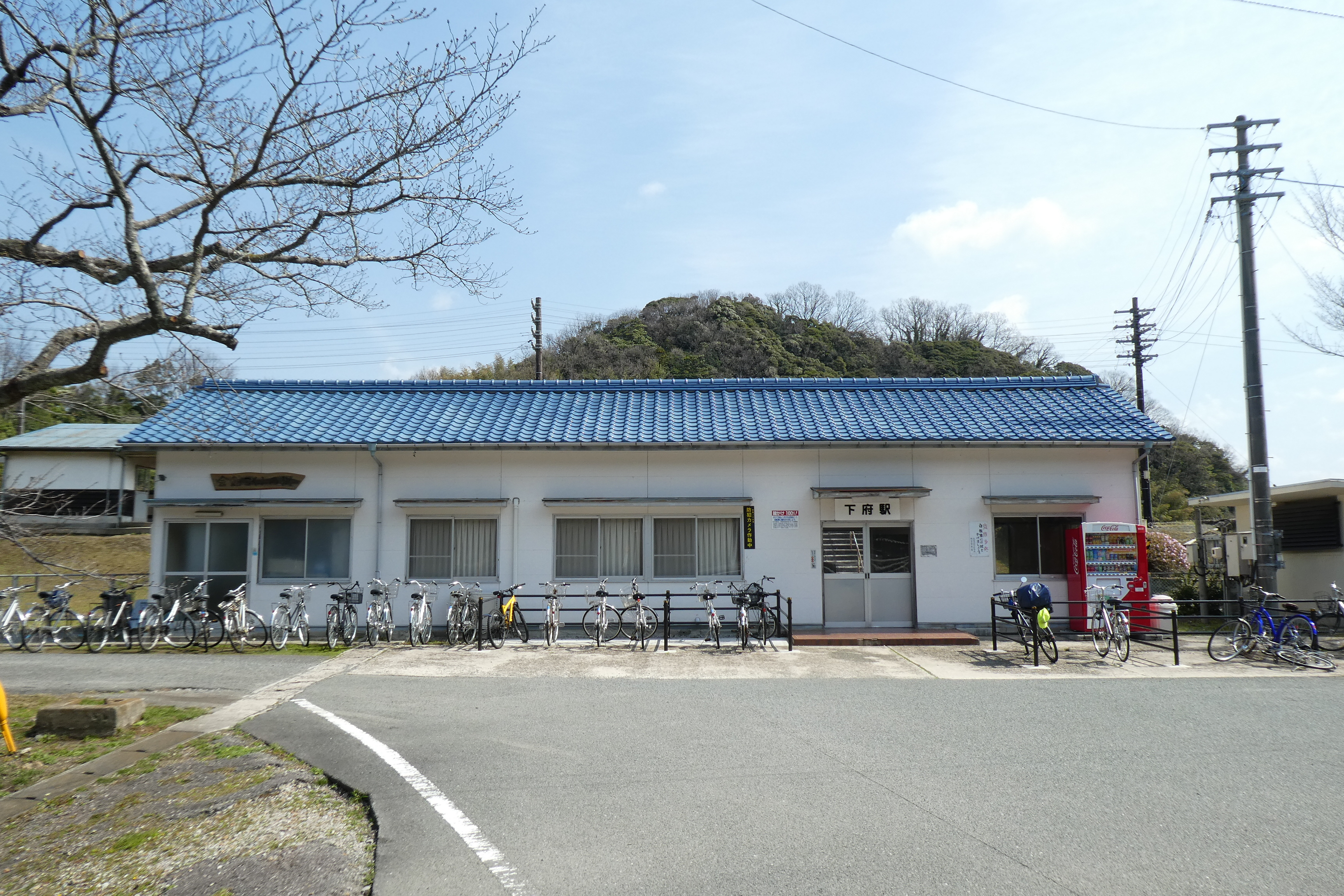
- Shimokō Station, March 2020

General information
- Location: 855, Shimokō-chō, Hamada-shi, Shimane-ken 697-0006; Japan
- Coordinates: 34°55′37.57″N 132°6′37.42″E
- Owner: West Japan Railway Company
- Operator: West Japan Railway Company
- Line: D San'in Main Line
- Distance: 469.7 km (291.9 miles) from Kyoto
- Platforms: 2 side platforms
- Tracks: 2
- Connections: Bus stop

Construction
- Structure type: At grade

Other information
- Status: Unstaffed
- Website: Official website

History
- Opened: 1 September 1921

Passengers
- FY2020: 141

Services
Preceding station	JR West	Following station
Hamada towards Masuda	San'in Line	Kushiro towards Yonago
Location
- Location within Shimane Prefecture Location within Japan

Shimokō Station (下府駅, Shimokō-eki) is a passenger railway station located in the city of Hamada, Shimane Prefecture, Japan. It is operated by the West Japan Railway Company (JR West).

== Lines ==
Shitokō Station is served by the JR West San'in Main Line, and is located 469.7 kilometers from the terminus of the line at Kyoto. Only local trains stop at this station.

== Station layout ==
The station consists of two opposed side platforms, connected by an underground passage. There is also one side track for maintenance. The station is unattended.

== Platforms ==
1	■ D San'in Main Line	for Gōtsu and Ōdashi
2	■ D San'in Main Line	for Hamada and Masuda

== History ==
Shitokō Station was opened on 1 September 1921 with the extension of the San'in Main Line between Tsunozu and Hamada . Freight operations were discontinued on 1 October 1974. With the privatization of the Japan National Railway (JNR) on 1 April 1987, the station came under the aegis of the West Japan railway Company (JR West).

== Passenger statistics ==
In fiscal 2020, the station was used by an average of 141 passengers daily.

== Surrounding area ==
- Hamada City Hamada Higashi Junior High School
- Japan National Route 9

== See also ==
- List of railway stations in Japan
