= Suetsune Station =

Railway station in Tottori, Tottori Prefecture, Japan

Suetsune Station 末恒駅
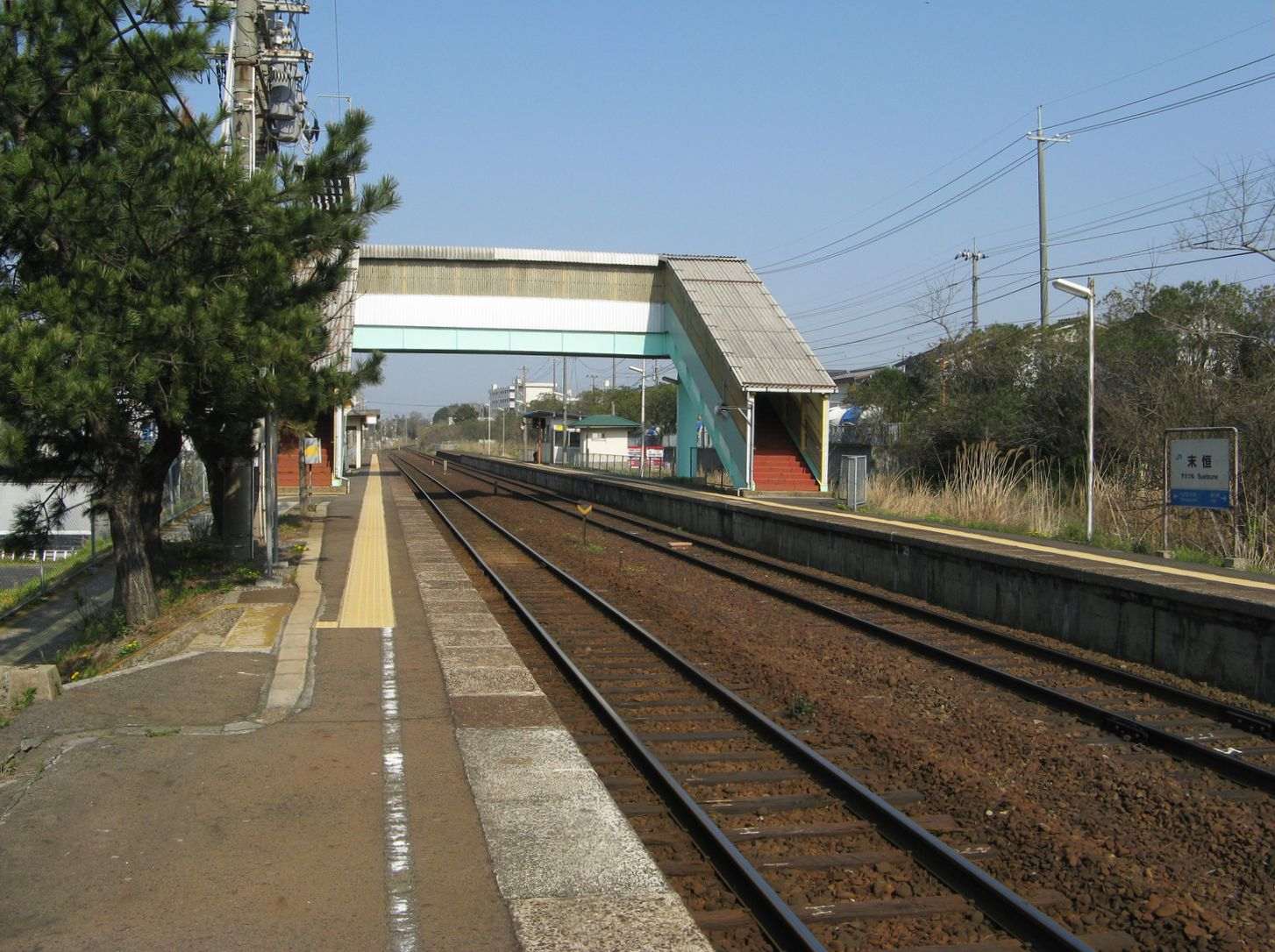
- Suetsune Station

General information
- Location: 304 Fushino, Tottori-shi, Tottori-ken 689-0201; Japan
- Coordinates: 35°31′26.81″N 134°8′9.24″E
- Operator: JR West
- Line: San'in Main Line
- Distance: 239.6 km (148.9 miles) from Kyoto
- Platforms: 2 side platforms
- Tracks: 2

Construction
- Structure type: At grade

Other information
- Status: Unstaffed
- Website: Official website

History
- Opened: 11 September 1928

Passengers
- 2020: 427 daily
Location
- Location within Tottori Prefecture Location within Japan

Suetsune Station (末恒駅, Suetsune-eki) is a passenger railway station located in the city of Tottori, Tottori Prefecture, Japan. It is operated by the West Japan Railway Company (JR West).

== Lines ==
Suetsune Station is served by the San'in Main Line, and is located 239.6 kilometers from the terminus of the line at Kyoto.

== Station layout ==
The station consists of two ground-level opposed side platforms connected by a footbridge. There is no station building and the station is unattended.

=== Platforms ===
1	■ San'in Main Line	for Hamasaka and Tottori
2	■ San'in Main Line	for Kurayoshi and Yonago

== Adjacent stations ==
West Japan Railway Company (JR West)

«	Service	»
Sanin Main Line
Limited Express Super Oki: Does not stop at this station
Limited Express Super Matsukaze: Does not stop at this station
Tottoridaigakumae	Local	Hōgi

== History ==
Suetsune Station opened on September 11, 1928. With the privatization of the Japan National Railways (JNR) on April 1, 1987, the station came under the aegis of the West Japan Railway Company.

== Passenger statistics ==
In fiscal 2020, the station was used by an average of 427 passengers daily.

== See also ==
- List of railway stations in Japan
