= University of Shimane =

- 島根県立大学
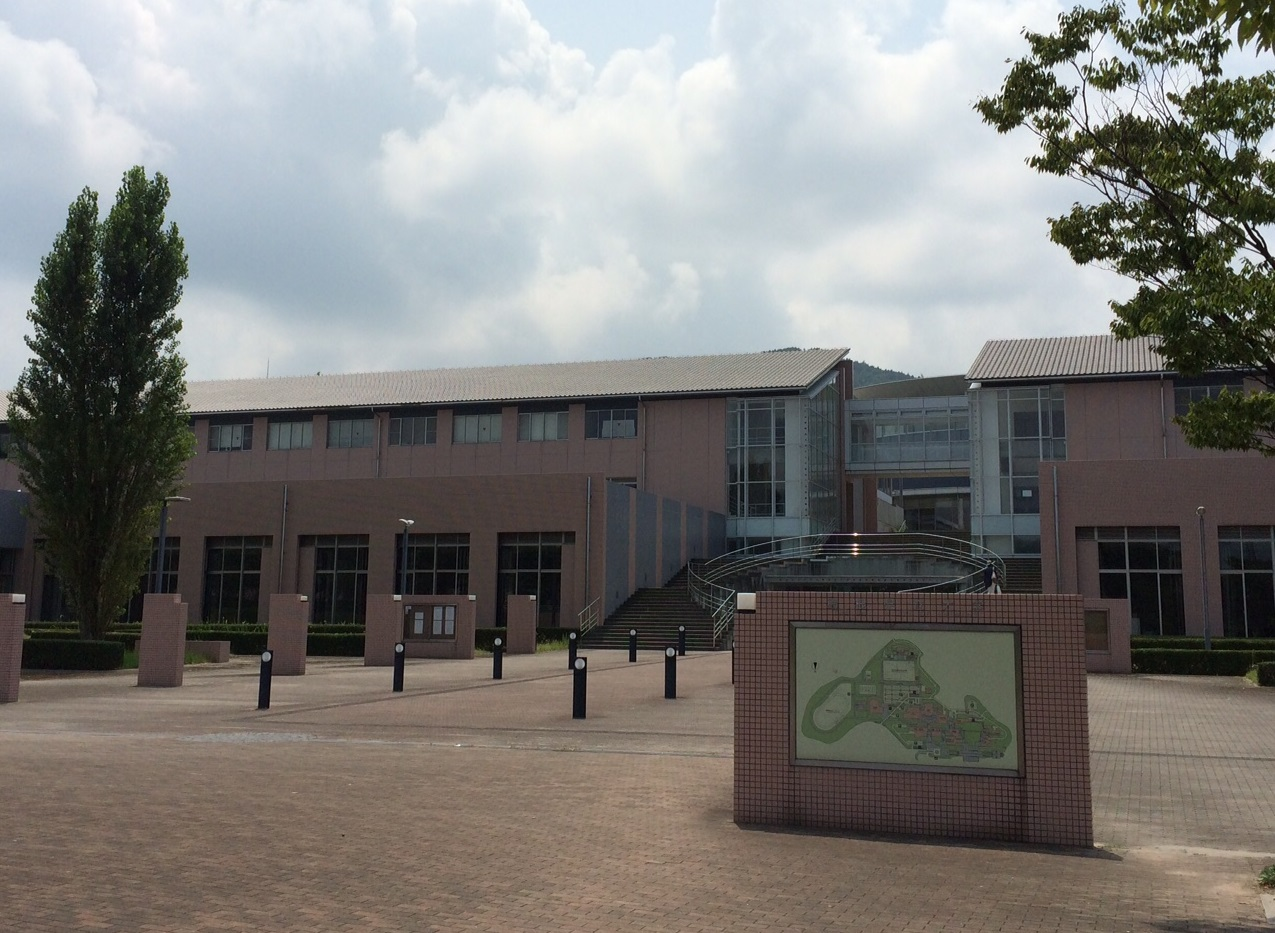
- Hamada Campus
- Type: Public University
- Established: 2000
- President: Kazuya Yamashita
- Location: 2433-2 Nohara-chō, Hamada, Shimane Prefecture, 697-0016, Japan; 34°53′05″N 132°04′40″E
- Campus: Hamada, Izumo and Matsue
- Mascot: Ororin
- Website: https://www.u-shimane.ac.jp/

The University of Shimane (島根県立大学, Shimane kenritsu daigaku) is a public university in Hamada, Shimane, Japan. The predecessor of the school was founded in 1993, and it was chartered as a university in 2000.
