= 1872 Hamada earthquake =

Earthquake in Japan

Coordinates: 35°9′0″N 132°6′0″E

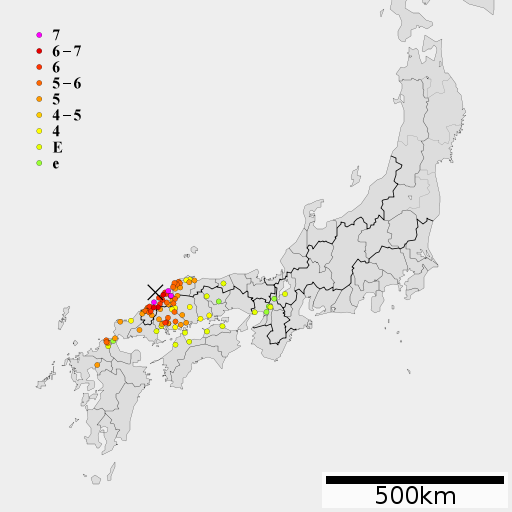
1872 Hamada earthquake intensity

The 1872 Hamada earthquake (Japanese: 浜田地震) was an earthquake that occurred on March 14, 1872 (the sixth day of the second month of Meiji 5 in the old Japanese calendar), off the coast of Hamada, Shimane Prefecture in Japan. This quake occurred at 16:40 local time.

== Overview ==
- Date : March 14, 1872
- Magnitude : 7.1 M_{K}
- Epicenter : off coast Hamada, Shimane Prefecture
- Death toll : 551 (official confirmed)

== Damage ==
According to the official confirmed report, 4506 houses were damaged by the earthquake, 230 houses were burned, 551 people were killed, and landslides destroyed 6567 homes in the affected area.
