= Hōgi Station =

Railway station in Tottori, Tottori Prefecture, Japan

Hōgi Station 宝木駅
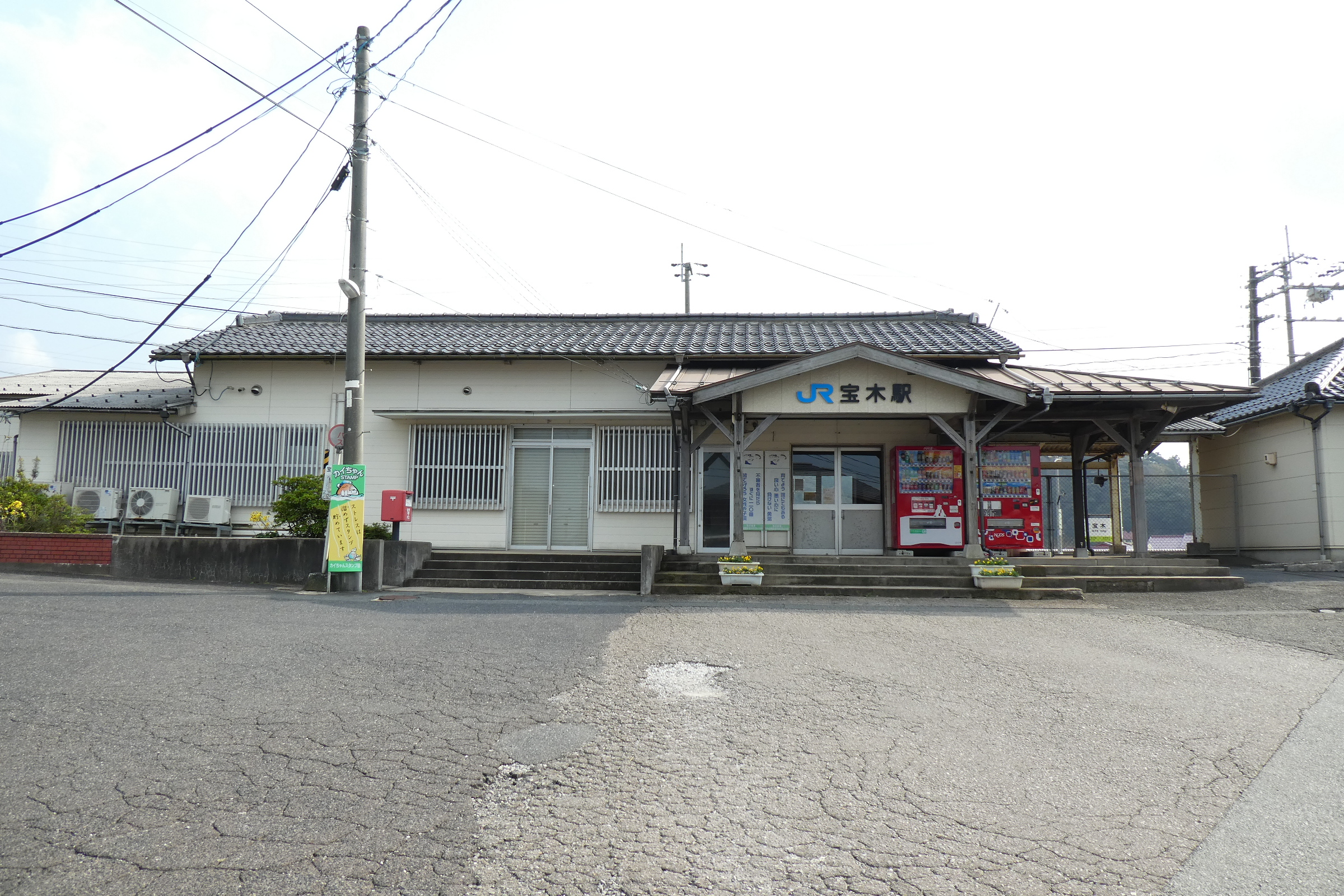
- Hōgi Station in 2019

General information
- Location: 1142 Hōgi, Ketaka-cho, Tottori-shi, Tottori-ken689-0216; Japan
- Coordinates: 35°30′50.75″N 134°4′55.81″E
- Operator: JR West
- Line: San'in Main Line
- Distance: 244.7 km (152.0 miles) from Kyoto
- Platforms: 1 side + 1 island platform
- Tracks: 3

Construction
- Structure type: At grade

Other information
- Status: Unstaffed
- Website: Official website

History
- Opened: 18 April 1907

Passengers
- 2020: 123 daily
Location
- Location within Tottori Prefecture Location within Japan

Hōgi Station (宝木駅, Hōgi-eki) is a passenger railway station located in the city of Tottori, Tottori Prefecture, Japan. It is operated by the West Japan Railway Company (JR West).

== Lines ==
Hōgi Station is served by the San'in Main Line, and is located 244.7 kilometers from the terminus of the line at Kyoto.

== Station layout ==
The station consists of one ground-level island platform and one ground-level side platform connected by a footbridge to the station building. The station is unattended.

=== Platforms ===
1	■ San'in Main Line	for Hamasaka and Tottori
2, 3	■ San'in Main Line	for Kurayoshi and Yonago

== Adjacent stations ==
West Japan Railway Company (JR West)

«	Service	»
Sanin Main Line
Limited Express Super Oki: Does not stop at this station
Limited Express Super Matsukaze: Does not stop at this station
Suetsune	Local	Hamamura

== History ==
Hōgi Station opened on April 28, 1907. With the privatization of the Japan National Railways (JNR) on April 1, 1987, the station came under the aegis of the West Japan Railway Company.

== Passenger statistics ==
In fiscal 2020, the station was used by an average of 123 passengers daily.

== See also ==
- List of railway stations in Japan
