= Miho-Misumi Station =

Railway station in Hamada, Shimane Prefecture, Japan

Miho-Misumi Station 三保三隅駅
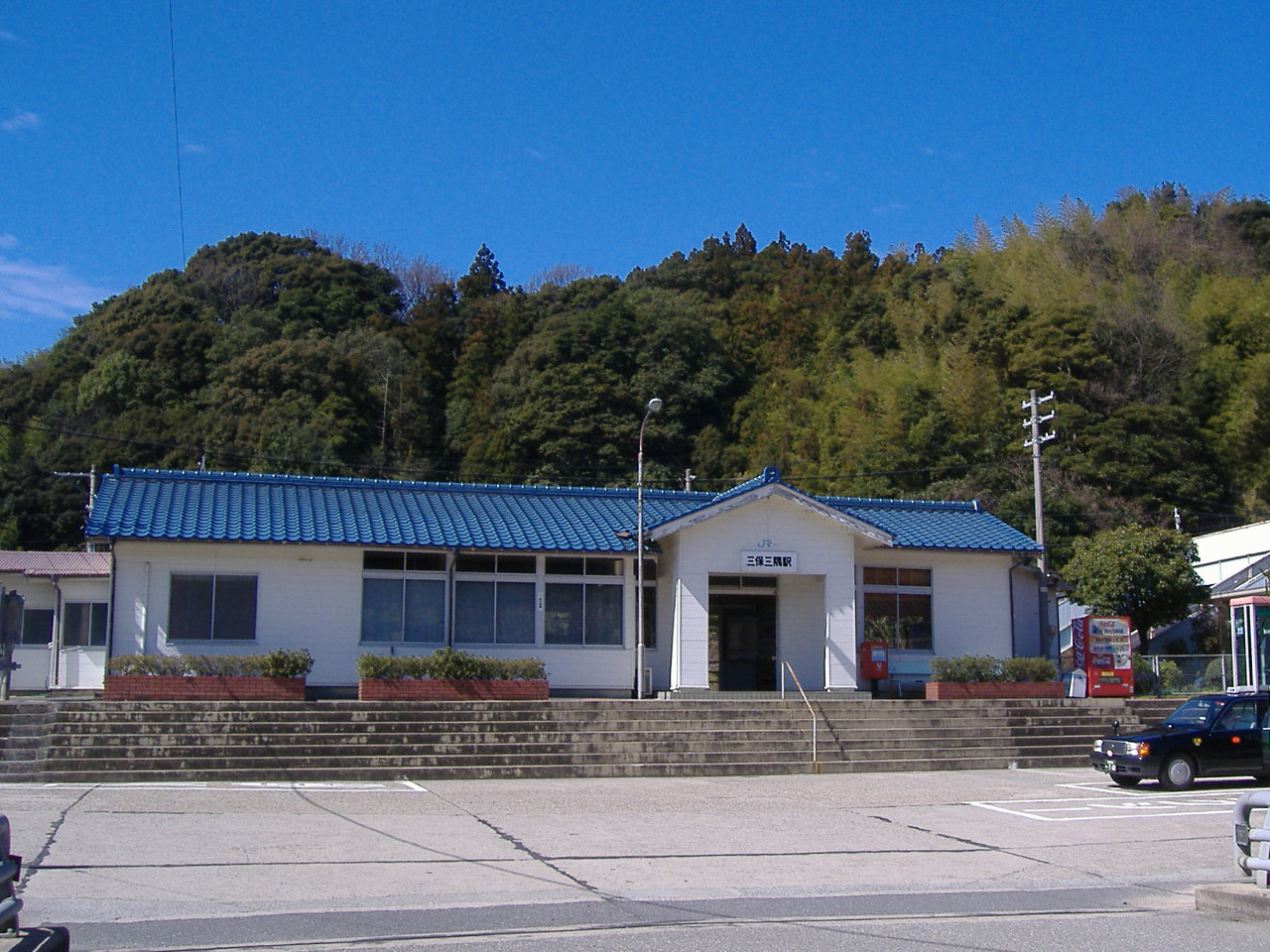
- Miho-Misumi Station, March 2007

General information
- Location: 469 Misumi-chō Saigōchi, Hamada-shi, Shimane-ken 699-3223; Japan
- Coordinates: 34°47′44.92″N 131°57′22.35″E
- Owner: West Japan Railway Company
- Operator: West Japan Railway Company
- Line: D San'in Main Line
- Distance: 492.6 km (306.1 miles) from Kyoto
- Platforms: 1 side + 1 island platform
- Tracks: 3
- Connections: Bus stop

Construction
- Structure type: At grade

Other information
- Status: Unstaffed
- Website: Official website

History
- Opened: 1 September 1922

Passengers
- FY2020: 84

Services
Preceding station	JR West	Following station
Okami towards Masuda	San'in Line	Orii towards Yonago
Location
- Location within Shimane Prefecture Location within Japan

Miho-Misumi Station (三保三隅駅, Miho-Misumi-eki) is a passenger railway station located in the city of Hamada, Shimane Prefecture, Japan. It is operated by the West Japan Railway Company (JR West).

== Lines ==
Miho-Misumi Station is served by the JR West San'in Main Line, and is located 492.6 kilometers from the terminus of the line at Kyoto.

== Station layout ==
The station consists of a side platform and an island platform. The station building is located next to the side platform, and is connected to the island platform by a footbridge. The station is unattended.

== Platforms ==
1	■ D San'in Main Line	for Masuda and Shin-Yamaguchi
2, 3	■ D San'in Main Line	for Hamada and Izumoshi

== History ==
Miho-Misumi Station was opened on 1 September 1922 when the San'in Main Line was extended from Sufu Station. The line was extended further to Iwami-Masuda Station (now Masuda Station) on 26December1923. Freight operations were discontinued on 26 March 1978. With the privatization of the Japan National Railway (JNR) on 1 April 1987, the station came under the aegis of the West Japan railway Company (JR West). Freight operations resumed on 1 April 1998 but were abolished again on 1 April 2014.

== Passenger statistics ==
In fiscal 2020, the station was used by an average of 84 passengers daily.

== Surrounding area ==
- Tanoura Beach
- Hamada City Issho Art Museum
- Misumi Central Park
- Hamada City Misumi Junior High School

== See also ==
- List of railway stations in Japan
