= Nishi-Hamada Station =

Railway station in Hamada, Shimane Prefecture, Japan

Nishi-Hamada Station 西浜田駅
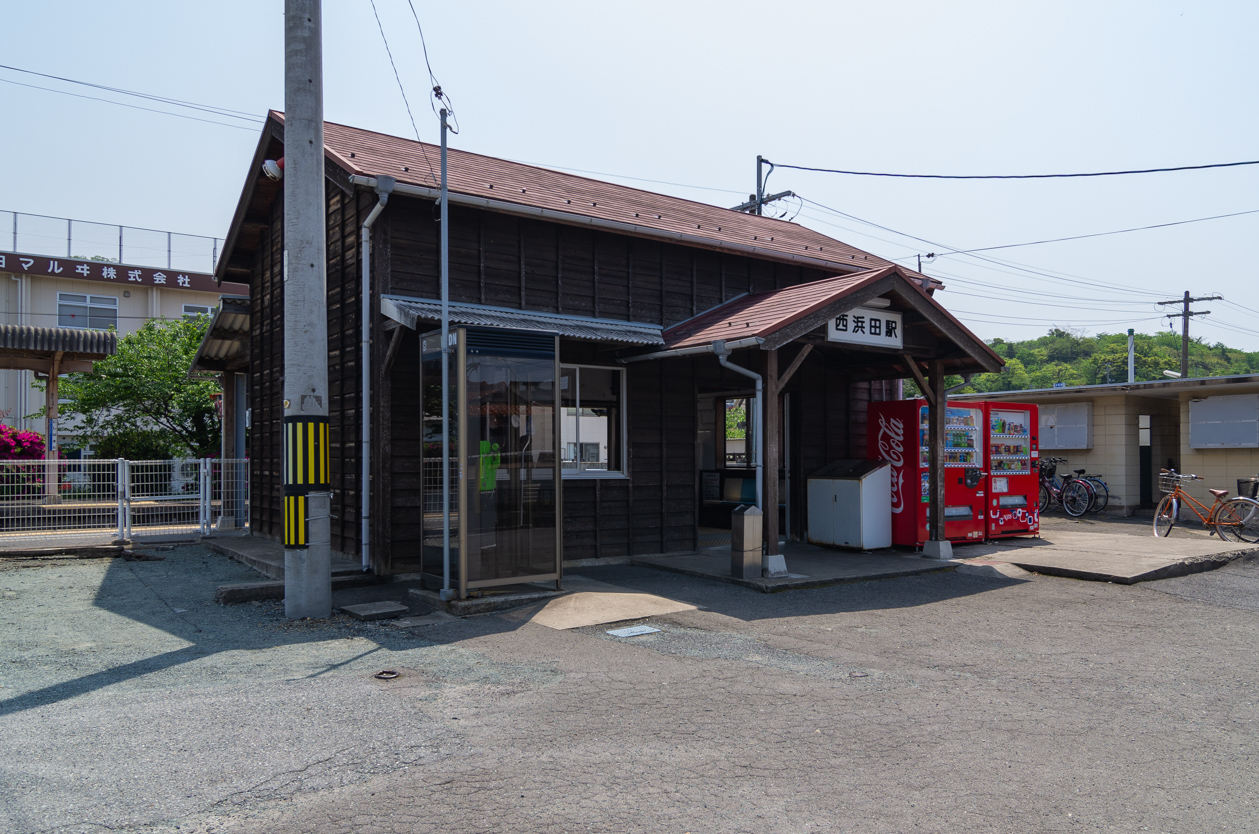
- Nishi-Hamada Station, May 2012

General information
- Location: 1445, Atsuta-chō, Hamada-shi, Shimane-ken 697-0062; Japan
- Coordinates: 34°52′10.08″N 132°3′1.91″E
- Owner: West Japan Railway Company
- Operator: West Japan Railway Company
- Line: D San'in Main Line
- Distance: 478.7 km (297.5 miles) from Kyoto
- Platforms: 2 side platforms
- Tracks: 2
- Connections: Bus stop

Construction
- Structure type: At grade

Other information
- Status: Unstaffed
- Website: Official website

History
- Opened: 10 March 1922
- Former names: Iwami-Nagahama (to 1949)

Passengers
- FY2020: 141

Services
| Preceding station | JR West | Following station |
|---|---|---|
| Sufu towards Masuda | San'in Line | Hamada towards Yonago |
Location
- Location within Shimane Prefecture Location within Japan

Nishi-Hamada Station (西浜田駅, Nishi-Hamada-eki) is a passenger railway station located in the city of Hamada, Shimane Prefecture, Japan. It is operated by the West Japan Railway Company (JR West).

== Lines ==
Nishi-Hamada Station is served by the JR West San'in Main Line, and is located 478.7 kilometers from the terminus of the line at Kyoto. Only local trains stop at this station.

== Station layout ==
The station consists of two opposed side platforms, connected by a footbridge. The platforms are not parallel. The station is unattended.

== Platforms ==
| 1 | ■ D San'in Main Line | for Hamada and Gōtsu |
| 2 | ■ D San'in Main Line | for Masuda and Higashi-Hagi |

== History ==
Nishi-Hamada Station was opened on 10 March 1922 as Iwami-Nagahama Station (石見長浜駅). It was renamed 15 December 1949 . Freight operations were discontinued on 7 November 1982. With the privatization of the Japan National Railway (JNR) on 1 April 1987, the station came under the aegis of the West Japan railway Company (JR West).

== Passenger statistics ==
In fiscal 2020, the station was used by an average of 141 passengers daily.

== Surrounding area ==
- Shimane Prefectural Hamada Commercial High School
- Hamada City Nagahama Elementary School
- Hamada Port
- Japan National Route 9

== See also ==
- List of railway stations in Japan
