= Uyagawa Station =

Railway station in Gōtsu, Shimane Prefecture, Japan

Uyagawa Station 敬川駅
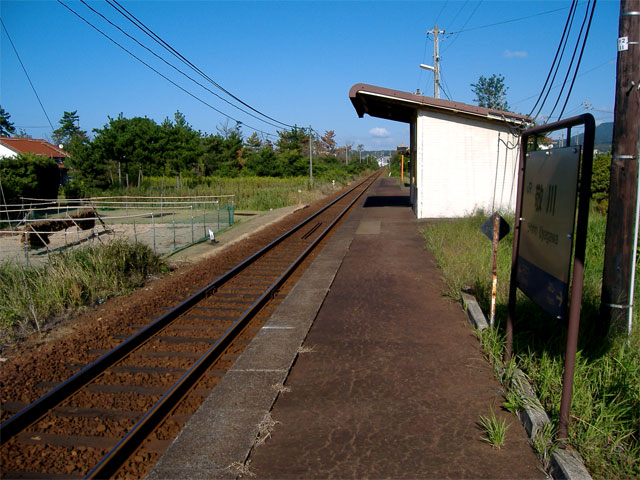
- Uyagawa Station shown in 2007

General information
- Location: 1197 Uyagawa-chō, Gōtsu-shi, Shimane-ken 699-3162; Japan
- Coordinates: 34°58′40.00″N 132°10′26.26″E
- Owner: West Japan Railway Company
- Operator: West Japan Railway Company
- Line: D San'in Main Line
- Distance: 460.5 km (286.1 miles) from Kyoto
- Platforms: 1 side platform
- Tracks: 2

Construction
- Structure type: At grade

Other information
- Status: Unstaffed
- Website: Official website

History
- Opened: 1 April 1959

Passengers
- FY2020: 23

Services
Preceding station	JR West	Following station
Hashi towards Masuda	San'in Line	Tsunozu towards Yonago
Location
- Location within Shimane Prefecture Location within Japan

Uyagawa Station (敬川駅, Uyagawa-eki) is a passenger railway station located in the city of Gōtsu, Shimane Prefecture, Japan. It is operated by the West Japan Railway Company (JR West).

== Lines ==
Uyagawa Station is served by the JR West San'in Main Line, and is located 460.5 kilometers from the terminus of the line at Kyoto. Only local trains stop at this station.

== Station layout ==
The station consists of one side platform serving a single bi-directional track. There is no station building and the station is unattended.

== History ==
Uyagawa Station was opened on 1 April 1959. With the privatization of the Japan National Railway (JNR) on 1 April 1987, the station came under the aegis of the West Japan railway Company (JR West).

== Passenger statistics ==
In fiscal 2020, the station was used by an average of 23 passengers daily.

== Surrounding area ==
- San'in Expressway Gōtsu-Nishi I.C.
- Japan National Route 9

== See also ==
- List of railway stations in Japan
