= Kushiro Station (Shimane) =

Railway station in Hamada, Shimane Prefecture, Japan

Kushiro Station 久代駅
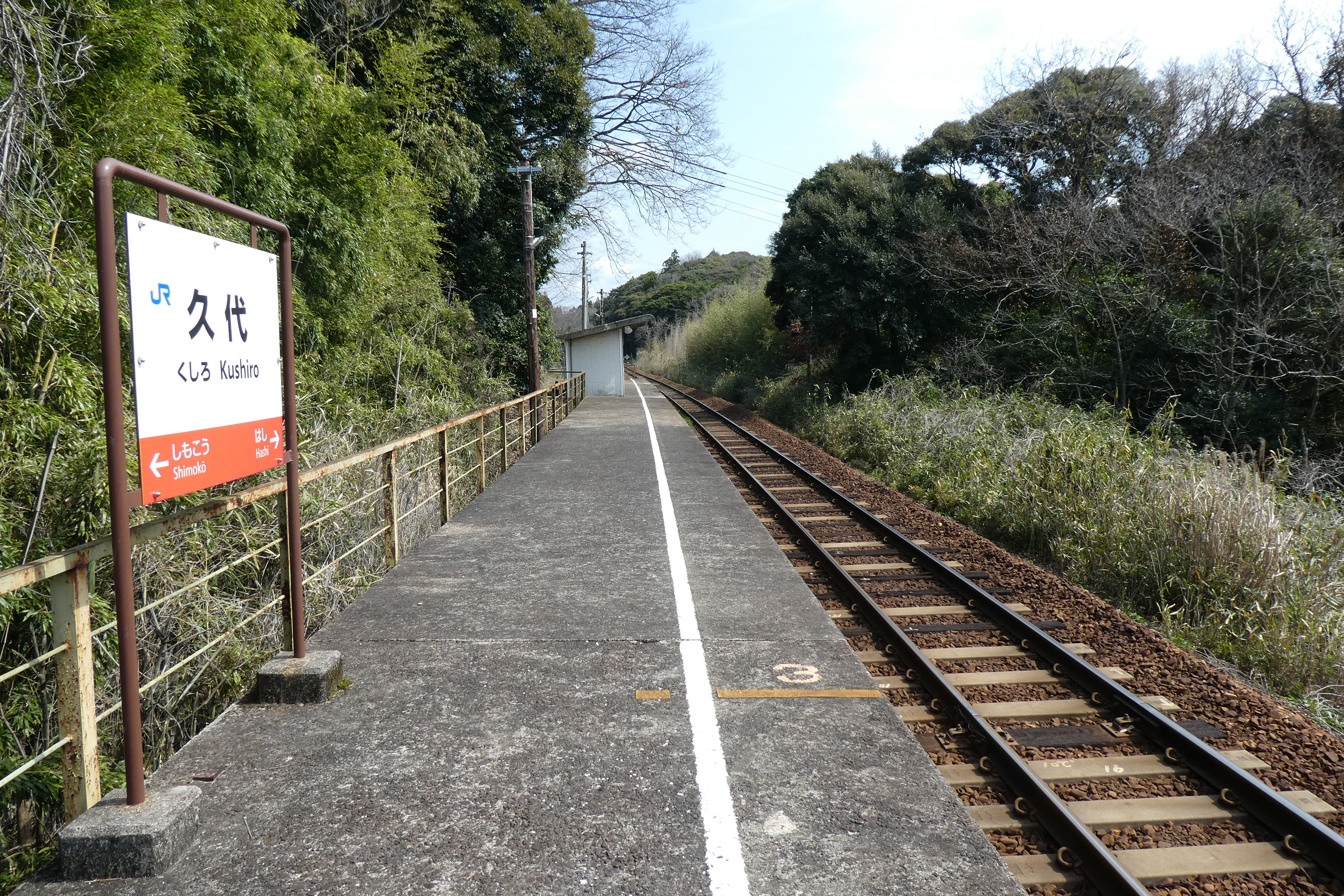
- Kushiro Station in March 2020

General information
- Location: 221, Kushiro-chō, Hamada-shi, Shimane-ken 697-0004; Japan
- Coordinates: 34°56′58.52″N 132°8′20.96″E
- Owner: West Japan Railway Company
- Operator: West Japan Railway Company
- Line: D San'in Main Line
- Distance: 465.6 km (289.3 miles) from Kyoto
- Platforms: 1 side platform
- Tracks: 1

Other information
- Status: Unstaffed
- Website: Official website

History
- Opened: 1 March 1959

Passengers
- FY2020: 3

Services
Preceding station	JR West	Following station
Shimokō towards Masuda	San'in Line	Hashi towards Yonago
Location
- Location within Shimane Prefecture Location within Japan

Kushiro Station (久代駅, Kushiro-eki) is a passenger railway station in Hamada, Shimane Prefecture, Japan. It is operated by the West Japan Railway Company (JR West).

== Lines ==
Kushiro Station is served by the JR West San'in Main Line, and is located 465.6 kilometers from the terminus of the line at Kyoto. Only local trains stop at this station.

== Station layout ==
The station consists of one side platform serving a single bi-directional track. There is no station building, but only a small shelter directly on the platform and the station is unattended.

== History ==
Kushiro Station was opened on 1 March 1959. With the privatization of the Japan National Railway (JNR) on 1 April 1987, the station came under the aegis of the West Japan railway Company (JR West).

== Passenger statistics ==
In fiscal 2020, the station was used by an average of 3 passengers daily.

== Surrounding area ==
- Iwami Seaside Park
- Japan National Route 9

== See also ==
- List of railway stations in Japan
