= Sufu Station =

Railway station in Hamada, Shimane Prefecture, Japan

Sufu Station 周布駅
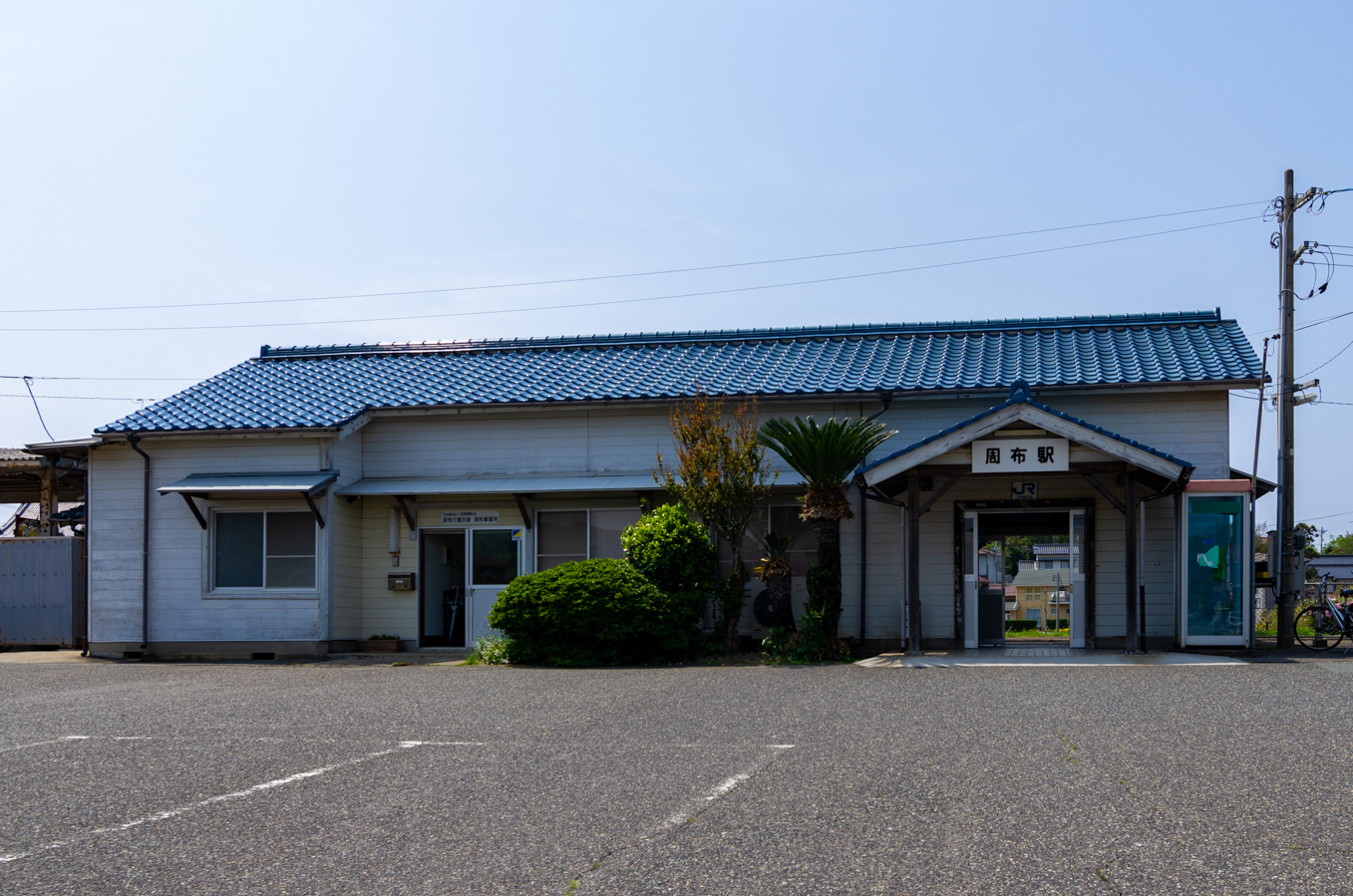
- Sufu Station, March 2012

General information
- Location: 49, Chiwa-chō, Hamada-shi, Shimane-ken 697-1326; Japan
- Coordinates: 34°51′29.83″N 132°1′2.85″E
- Owner: West Japan Railway Company
- Operator: West Japan Railway Company
- Line: D San'in Main Line
- Distance: 482.8 km (300.0 miles) from Kyoto
- Platforms: 1 side platform
- Tracks: 1
- Connections: Bus stop

Construction
- Structure type: At grade

Other information
- Status: Unstaffed
- Website: Official website

History
- Opened: 10 March 1922

Passengers
- FY2020: 68

Services
Preceding station	JR West	Following station
Orii towards Masuda	San'in Line	Nishi-Hamada towards Yonago
Location
- Location within Shimane Prefecture Location within Japan

Sufu Station (周布駅, Sufu-eki) is a passenger railway station located in the city of Hamada, Shimane Prefecture, Japan. It is operated by the West Japan Railway Company (JR West).

== Lines ==
Sufu Station is served by the JR West San'in Main Line, and is located 482.8 kilometers from the terminus of the line at Kyoto. Only local trains stop at this station.

== Station layout ==
The station consists of one side platform serving a single bi-directional track. The station is unattended. The former station office is now used as the office of a social welfare corporation.

== History ==
Sufu Station was opened on 10 March 1922 when the San'in Main Line was extended from Hamada Station. The line was further extended to Miho-Misumi on 1 September of the same year. Freight operations were discontinued on 1 October 1974. With the privatization of the Japan National Railway (JNR) on 1 April 1987, the station came under the aegis of the West Japan railway Company (JR West).

== Passenger statistics ==
In fiscal 2020, the station was used by an average of 68 passengers daily.

== Surrounding area ==
- Sufu Kofun
- Tsuma fishing port
- Japan National Route 9

== See also ==
- List of railway stations in Japan
