= Tsunozu Station =

Railway station in Gōtsu, Shimane Prefecture, Japan

Tsunozu Station 都野津駅
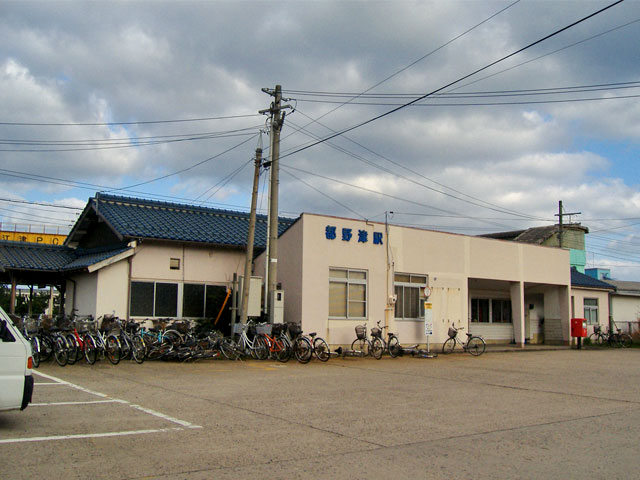
- Tsunozu Station, March 2007

General information
- Location: 2270 Tsunozu, Tsunozu-chō, Gōtsu-shi, Shimane-ken 695-0021; Japan
- Coordinates: 34°59′22.82″N 132°11′15.54″E
- Owner: West Japan Railway Company
- Operator: West Japan Railway Company
- Line: D San'in Main Line
- Distance: 458.7 km (285.0 miles) from Kyoto
- Platforms: 2 side platforms
- Tracks: 2
- Connections: Bus stop

Construction
- Structure type: At grade

Other information
- Status: Unstaffed
- Website: Official website

History
- Opened: 25 December 1920

Passengers
- FY2020: 164

Services
Preceding station	JR West	Following station
Uyagawa towards Masuda	San'in Line	Gōtsu towards Yonago
Location
- Location within Shimane Prefecture Location within Japan

Tsunozu Station (都野津駅, Tsunozu-eki) is a passenger railway station located in the city of Gōtsu, Shimane Prefecture, Japan. It is operated by the West Japan Railway Company (JR West).

== Lines ==
Tsunozu Station is served by the JR West San'in Main Line, and is located 458.7 kilometers from the terminus of the line at Kyoto. Only local trains stop at this station.

== Station layout ==
The station consists of two opposed side platforms connected to the station building by a level crossing. The station is unattended.

== Platforms ==
1	■ D San'in Main Line	for Hamada and Masuda
2	■ D San'in Main Line	for Izumoshi and Matsue

== History ==
Tsunozu Station was opened on 25 December 1920 when the San'in Main Line was extended from Asari Station. The line was further extended to Hamada Station on 1 September 1921. Freight operations were discontinued on 7 November 1982. With the privatization of the Japan National Railway (JNR) on 1 April 1987, the station came under the aegis of the West Japan railway Company (JR West).

== Passenger statistics ==
In fiscal 2020, the station was used by an average of 164 passengers daily.

== Surrounding area ==
- Shimane Prefectural Gotsu High School
- Japan National Route 9

== See also ==
- List of railway stations in Japan
