= San'in Main Line =

Railway line in western Japan

Sanin Main Line
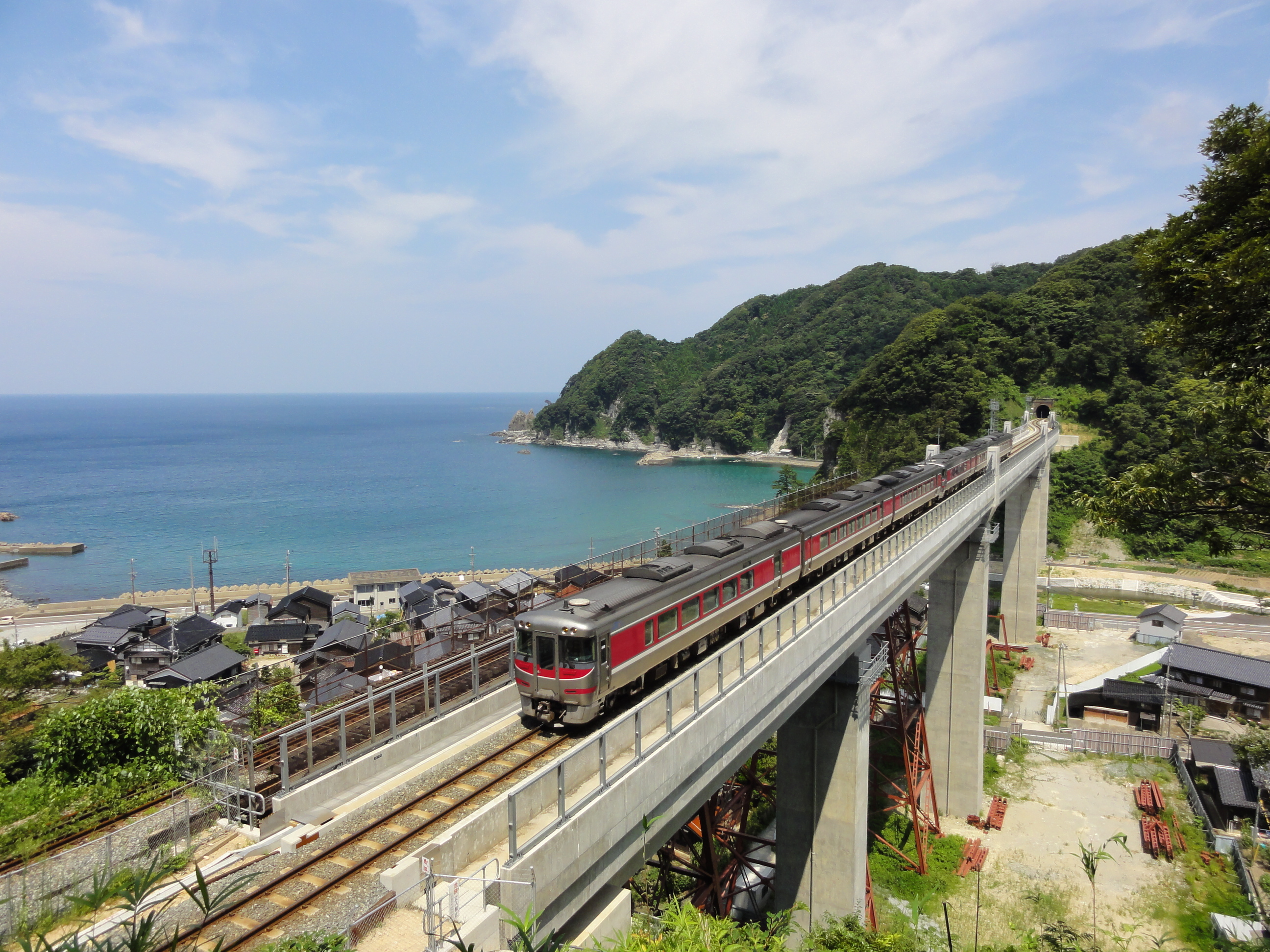
- Amarube Viaduct in Kami, Hyōgo

Overview
- Other name: Sagano Line (Kyoto - Sonobe)
- Native name: 山陰本線
- Owner: JR West
- Locale: Kyoto, Hyōgo, Tottori, Shimane and Yamaguchi Prefectures
- Termini: Kyoto; Shimonoseki
- Stations: 159

Service
- Type: Regional rail
- Operator(s): JR West; JR Freight

History
- Opened: 15 February 1897; 128 years ago
- Last extension: 24 February 1933; 92 years ago

Technical
- Line length: 676.0 km (420.0 mi)
- Track gauge: 1,067 mm (3 ft 6 in)
- Operating speed: 85 km/h (53 mph); 130 km/h (81 mph)

The San'in Main Line (山陰本線, San'in-honsen) is a railway line in western Japan, which connects Kyoto and Shimonoseki, Yamaguchi, operated by West Japan Railway Company (JR West). It is the major railway line of the San'in region, approximately paralleling the Japan Sea, crossing Kyoto, Hyōgo, Tottori, Shimane, and Yamaguchi prefectures. The main portion from Kyoto to Hatabu is the longest single continuous railway line in Japan at 673.8 km (418.7 mi), although no regularly scheduled train operates over the entire line.

The section between Kyoto and Sonobe, connecting Kyoto and its northern suburbs, is a part of JR West's Urban Network and is nicknamed the Sagano Line.

== Basic data ==
- Distances: 676.0 km (420.0 mi)
- Operators
  - West Japan Railway Company (Category 1)
    - Kyoto - Hatabu: 673.8 km (418.7 mi)
    - Nagatoshi - Senzaki: 2.2 km (1.4 mi)
  - Japan Freight Railway Company (Category 2)
    - Hōki-Daisen - Higashi-Matsue: 27.1 km (16.8 mi)
      Yonago - Higashi-Matsue temporary closed
    - Okami - Masuda: 16.9 km (10.5 mi)
- Track:
  - Double: Kyoto – Sonobe, Ayabe – Fukuchiyama, Hōki-Daisen – Yasugi, Higashi-Matsue – Matsue, Tamatsukuri-Onsen – Kimachi
  - Single: the rest
- Electric supply:
  - Kyoto – Kinosaki-Onsen, Hōki-Daisen – Nishi-Izumo: 1,500 V DC
- Railway signalling:
  - Kyoto – Nishi-Izumo: Automatic
  - Nishi-Izumo – Hatabu, including "Senzaki branch line": Special Automatic; a simplified automatic system
- Maximum speed in service:
  - Kyoto – Saga-Arashiyama: 120 km/h (75 mph)
  - Saga-Arashiyama – Umahori: 130 km/h (81 mph)
  - Umahori – Ayabe: 120 km/h (75 mph)
  - Ayabe – Fukuchiyama: 130 km/h (81 mph)
  - Fukuchiyama – Tottori: 95 km/h (59 mph)
  - Tottori – Izumoshi: 120 km/h (75 mph)
  - Izumoshi – Masuda: 110 km/h (68 mph)
  - Masuda – Hatabu: 95 km/h (59 mph)
  - Nagatoshi – Senzaki: 85 km/h (53 mph)

== Stations ==
=== From Kyoto to Sonobe (Sagano Line) ===
Stations on this segment
Kyoto - Umekōji-Kyōtonishi - Tambaguchi - Nijo - Emmachi - Hanazono - Uzumasa - Saga-Arashiyama - Hozukyo - Umahori - Kameoka - Namikawa - Chiyokawa - Yagi - Yoshitomi - Sonobe

=== From Sonobe to Kinosaki-Onsen ===
This section is designated the letter "E".

Rapid trains are operated as local trains and stop at every station between Sonobe and Fukuchiyama.

For Limited Express Maizuru, Hashidate, Kinosaki, Kounotori and Hamakaze stopping patterns, please check their respective articles.

Station		Distance (km)	Transfers	Location	
Sonobe	園部	34.2	( E16 Sagano Line)	Nantan	Kyoto
Funaoka	船岡	38.2		Nantan	Kyoto
Hiyoshi	日吉	41.9		Nantan	Kyoto
Shinkyūdaigakumae	鍼灸大学前	44.3		Nantan	Kyoto
Goma	胡麻	47.1		Nantan	Kyoto
Shimoyama	下山	51.9		Kyōtamba, Funai	Kyoto
Wachi	和知	58.6		Kyōtamba, Funai	Kyoto
Aseri	安栖里	60.7		Kyōtamba, Funai	Kyoto
Tachiki	立木	65.5		Kyōtamba, Funai	Kyoto
Yamaga	山家	69.0		Ayabe	Kyoto
Ayabe	綾部	76.2	Maizuru Line	Ayabe	Kyoto
Takatsu	高津	80.3		Ayabe	Kyoto
Isa	石原	82.8		Fukuchiyama	Kyoto
Fukuchiyama	福知山	88.5	Fukuchiyama Line; Kyoto Tango Railway (Willer Trains): Miyafuku Line	Fukuchiyama	Kyoto
Kamikawaguchi	上川口	95.2		Fukuchiyama	Kyoto
Shimo-Yakuno	下夜久野	102.4		Fukuchiyama	Kyoto
Kami-Yakuno	上夜久野	109.8		Fukuchiyama	Kyoto
Yanase	梁瀬	115.6		Asago	Hyōgo
Wadayama	和田山	119.0	Bantan Line	Asago	Hyōgo
Yabu	養父	124.2		Yabu	Hyōgo
Yōka	八鹿	131.2		Yabu	Hyōgo
Ebara	江原	138.7		Toyooka	Hyōgo
Kokufu	国府	142.4		Toyooka	Hyōgo
Toyooka	豊岡	148.4	Willer Trains Miyatoyo Line	Toyooka	Hyōgo
Gembudō	玄武洞	153.7		Toyooka	Hyōgo
Kinosaki-Onsen	城崎温泉	158.0		Toyooka	Hyōgo

=== From Kinosaki-Onsen to Yonago ===
This section is designated the letter "A".

For Limited Express Hamakaze, Super Hakuto, Super Inaba, Super Oki and Super Matsukaze stopping patterns, please check their respective articles.

Station		Distance (km)	Transfers	Location	
Kinosaki-Onsen	城崎温泉	158.0		Toyooka	Hyōgo
Takeno	竹野	166.0		Toyooka	Hyōgo
Satsu	佐津	173.4		Kami, Mikata	Hyōgo
Shibayama	柴山	175.7		Kami, Mikata	Hyōgo
Kasumi	香住	180.0		Kami, Mikata	Hyōgo
Yoroi	鎧	185.4		Kami, Mikata	Hyōgo
Amarube	餘部	187.2		Kami, Mikata	Hyōgo
Kutani	久谷	191.8		Shin'onsen, Mikata	Hyōgo
Hamasaka	浜坂	197.9		Shin'onsen, Mikata	Hyōgo
Moroyose	諸寄	199.8		Shin'onsen, Mikata	Hyōgo
Igumi	居組	204.2		Shin'onsen, Mikata	Hyōgo
Higashihama	東浜	207.5		Iwami, Iwami	Tottori
Iwami	岩美	211.9		Iwami, Iwami	Tottori
Ōiwa	大岩	214.8		Iwami, Iwami	Tottori
Fukube	福部	219.1		Tottori	Tottori
Tottori	鳥取	230.3	Inbi Line	Tottori	Tottori
Koyama	湖山	234.5		Tottori	Tottori
Tottoridaigakumae	鳥取大学前	235.8		Tottori	Tottori
Suetsune	末恒	239.6		Tottori	Tottori
Hōgi	宝木	244.7		Tottori	Tottori
Hamamura	浜村	247.6		Tottori	Tottori
Aoya	青谷	252.8		Tottori	Tottori
Tomari	泊	258.9		Yurihama, Tōhaku	Tottori
Matsuzaki	松崎	264.6		Yurihama, Tōhaku	Tottori
Kurayoshi	倉吉	270.1		Kurayoshi	Tottori
Shimohōjō	下北条	275.2		Hokuei, Tōhaku	Tottori
Yura (Conan Station)	由良 （コナン駅）	280.1		Hokuei, Tōhaku	Tottori
Urayasu	浦安	285.8		Kotoura, Tōhaku	Tottori
Yabase	八橋	287.6		Kotoura, Tōhaku	Tottori
Akasaki	赤碕	291.3		Kotoura, Tōhaku	Tottori
Nakayamaguchi	中山口	295.5		Daisen, Saihaku	Tottori
Shimoichi	下市	297.7		Daisen, Saihaku	Tottori
Mikuriya	御来屋	303.6		Daisen, Saihaku	Tottori
Nawa	名和	304.7		Daisen, Saihaku	Tottori
Daisenguchi	大山口	308.8		Daisen, Saihaku	Tottori
Yodoe	淀江	312.7		Yonago	Tottori
Hōki-Daisen	伯耆大山	318.2	Hakubi Line	Yonago	Tottori
Higashiyama-kōen	東山公園	321.2		Yonago	Tottori
Yonago	米子	323.0	Sakai Line	Yonago	Tottori

=== From Yonago to Masuda ===
This section is designated the letter "D".

- TL: Rapid Tottori Liner (快速とっとりライナー)
- AL: Rapid Aqua Liner (快速アクアライナー)
- CL: Rapid Commuter Liner (快速通勤ライナー)
- All trains stop at stations signed "+". Most trains stop at "‡". Most trains do not stop at "*". No trains (other than local) stop at "-".
- Rapid Commuter Liner runs from Nishi-Izumo to Yonago, one direction alone
- For Limited Express Yakumo, Super Oki, Super Matsukaze and Sunrise Izumo stopping patterns, please check their respective articles.

Station		Distance (km)	TL	AL	CL	Transfers	Location	
Yonago	米子	323.0	+	+	+	Sakai Line	Yonago	Tottori
Yasugi	安来	331.8	+	+	+		Yasugi	Shimane
Arashima	荒島	336.6	+	+	+		Yasugi	Shimane
Iya	揖屋	342.2	+	+	+		Matsue	Shimane
Higashi-Matsue	東松江	345.3	+	+	+		Matsue	Shimane
Matsue	松江	351.9	+	+	+		Matsue	Shimane
Nogi	乃木	354.6	+	+	-		Matsue	Shimane
Tamatsukuri-Onsen	玉造温泉	358.5	+	+	-		Matsue	Shimane
Kimachi	来待	364.5	+	+	-		Matsue	Shimane
Shinji	宍道	368.9	+	+	+	Kisuki Line	Matsue	Shimane
Shōbara	荘原	373.0	+	+	+		Izumo	Shimane
Naoe	直江	379.1	+	+	+		Izumo	Shimane
Izumoshi	出雲市	384.6	+	+	+	Kita-Matsue Line (Dentetsu-Izumoshi)	Izumo	Shimane
Nishi-Izumo	西出雲	389.4		‡			Izumo	Shimane
Izumo-Jinzai	出雲神西	391.4		*			Izumo	Shimane
Kōnan	江南	393.5		*			Izumo	Shimane
Oda	小田	400.1		*			Izumo	Shimane
Tagi	田儀	404.0		*			Izumo	Shimane
Hane	波根	411.5		*			Ōda	Shimane
Kute	久手	413.7		*			Ōda	Shimane
Ōdashi	大田市	417.2		+			Ōda	Shimane
Shizuma	静間	420.2		*			Ōda	Shimane
Isotake	五十猛	422.8		*			Ōda	Shimane
Nima	仁万	428.9		+			Ōda	Shimane
Maji	馬路	431.9		*			Ōda	Shimane
Yusato	湯里	434.8		*			Ōda	Shimane
Yunotsu	温泉津	437.9		+			Ōda	Shimane
Iwami-Fukumitsu	石見福光	440.8		*			Ōda	Shimane
Kuromatsu	黒松	443.6		*			Gōtsu	Shimane
Asari	浅利	448.0		*			Gōtsu	Shimane
Gōtsu	江津	454.3		+		Sankō Line (closed 1 April 2018)	Gōtsu	Shimane
Tsunozu	都野津	458.7		+			Gōtsu	Shimane
Uyagawa	敬川	460.5		*			Gōtsu	Shimane
Hashi	波子	463.3		+			Gōtsu	Shimane
Kushiro	久代	465.6		*			Hamada	Shimane
Shimokō	下府	469.7		*			Hamada	Shimane
Hamada	浜田	473.3		+			Hamada	Shimane
Nishi-Hamada	西浜田	478.7		+			Hamada	Shimane
Sufu	周布	482.8		*			Hamada	Shimane
Orii	折居	487.6		+			Hamada	Shimane
Miho-Misumi	三保三隅	492.6		+			Hamada	Shimane
Okami	岡見	497.6		*			Hamada	Shimane
Kamate	鎌手	502.7		*			Masuda	Shimane
Iwami-Tsuda	石見津田	507.2		*			Masuda	Shimane
Masuda	益田	514.5		+		Yamaguchi Line	Masuda	Shimane

=== From Masuda to Shimonoseki ===
Station		Distance (km)	Transfers	Location	
Sanin Main Line
Masuda	益田	514.5	Yamaguchi Line	Masuda	Shimane
Todakohama	戸田小浜	524.3		Masuda	Shimane
Iinoura	飯浦	528.0		Masuda	Shimane
Esaki	江崎	533.8		Hagi	Yamaguchi
Susa	須佐	540.4		Hagi	Yamaguchi
Utagō	宇田郷	549.2		Abu, Abu	Yamaguchi
Kiyo	木与	555.6		Abu, Abu	Yamaguchi
Nago	奈古	560.2		Abu, Abu	Yamaguchi
Nagato-Ōi	長門大井	564.5		Hagi	Yamaguchi
Koshigahama	越ヶ浜	569.1		Hagi	Yamaguchi
Higashi-Hagi	東萩	572.0		Hagi	Yamaguchi
Hagi	萩	575.8		Hagi	Yamaguchi
Tamae	玉江	578.2		Hagi	Yamaguchi
Sammi	三見	583.9		Hagi	Yamaguchi
Ii	飯井	588.1		Hagi	Yamaguchi
Nagato-Misumi	長門三隅	594.5		Nagato	Yamaguchi
Nagatoshi	長門市	599.6	Mine Line, Sanin Main Line "Senzaki branch line"	Nagato	Yamaguchi
Kiwado	黄波戸	604.9		Nagato	Yamaguchi
Nagato-Furuichi	長門古市	609.0		Nagato	Yamaguchi
Hitomaru	人丸	613.5		Nagato	Yamaguchi
Igami	伊上	617.9		Nagato	Yamaguchi
Nagato-Awano	長門粟野	622.1		Shimonoseki	Yamaguchi
Agawa	阿川	627.4		Shimonoseki	Yamaguchi
Kottoi	特牛	631.1		Shimonoseki	Yamaguchi
Takibe	滝部	635.1		Shimonoseki	Yamaguchi
Nagato-Futami	長門二見	639.9		Shimonoseki	Yamaguchi
Ukahongō	宇賀本郷	643.5		Shimonoseki	Yamaguchi
Yutama	湯玉	645.7		Shimonoseki	Yamaguchi
Kogushi	小串	650.2		Shimonoseki	Yamaguchi
Kawatana-Onsen	川棚温泉	652.9		Shimonoseki	Yamaguchi
Kuroimura	黒井村	655.4		Shimonoseki	Yamaguchi
Umegatō	梅ヶ峠	658.8		Shimonoseki	Yamaguchi
Yoshimi	吉見	662.7		Shimonoseki	Yamaguchi
Fukue	福江	665.6		Shimonoseki	Yamaguchi
Yasuoka	安岡	668.2		Shimonoseki	Yamaguchi
Kajikuri-Gōdaichi	梶栗郷台地	679.6		Shimonoseki	Yamaguchi
Ayaragi	綾羅木	670.7		Shimonoseki	Yamaguchi
Hatabu	幡生	673.8	Sanyō Main Line	Shimonoseki	Yamaguchi
Shimonoseki	下関	677.3		Shimonoseki	Yamaguchi

=== Senzaki Branch Line ===
Station		Distance (km)	Transfers	Location	
Nagatoshi	長門市	0.0	Mine Line, Sanin Main Line	Nagato	Yamaguchi
Senzaki	仙崎	2.2		Nagato	Yamaguchi

== History ==
The line was built by three different private companies, which were subsequently nationalised and connected by the Japanese Government Railway (JGR). The Kyoto Railway opened the section to Sonobe between 1897 and 1899. The Bantsuru Railway opened the Ayabe to Fukuchiyama section (as part of the current Maizuru Line) in 1904. Both companies were nationalised in 1907.

The first section opened by the JGR was between Yonago and Mikuriya in 1902, and the line was then progressively extended eastward, reaching Tottori in 1907 and Iwami in 1908, the same year the current Bantan Line opened to Wadayama and Yoka. Construction of that line continued westward, and the two lines were connected in 1912. In the meantime, the Sonobe to Ayabe section was opened in 1910, and the Fukuchiyama to Wadayama section the following year. In addition, construction from Yonago progressed westward, opening to Matsue in 1908 and Izumoshi in 1910, resulting in the 385 km (239 mi) continuous line upon the 1912 connection mentioned above. At the western end, the Choshu Railway opened the Hatabu to Kogushi section in 1914.

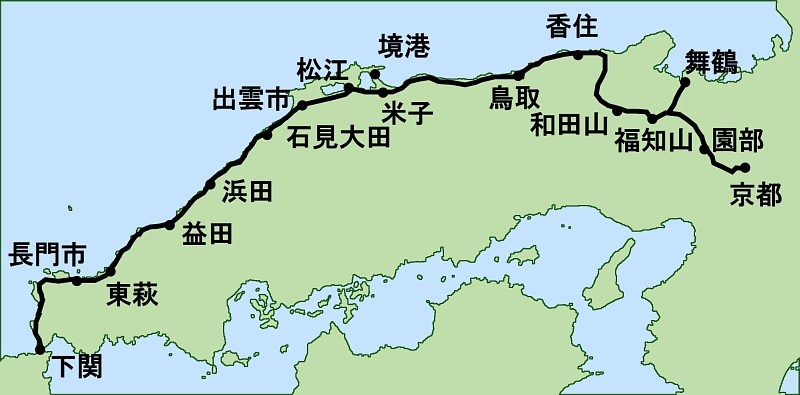
A map of the completed San'in 1933 route.

From Izumoshi, construction continued progressively westward, opening to Masuda in 1923, and to Todakohama in 1925, the year that the Choshu Railway was nationalised and the Kogushi to Takibe section opened, with construction then continuing from both directions until the two sections were connected in 1933, completing the current line.

=== Double-tracking ===
The Yonago to Hoki-Daisen section was double-tracked between 1962 and 1966, with the Ayabe to Fukuchiyama section double-tracked in between 1968 and 1969, and the Tamatsukuri-Onsen to Kimachi section in 1970. The Matsue to Higashi-Matsue section was double-tracked in 1979, and the Yonago to Yasugi section in 1980. The original Saga-Arashiyama to Umahori section was built on the banks of the Hozugawa in a narrow gorge. A new double-track alignment was opened in 1989, and the original alignment became the Sagano Scenic Railway. Further double-tracking occurred in stages, with the entire Kyoto to Sonobe section double-tracked by 2010.

=== Electrification ===
The Hoki-Daisen to Izumoshi section was electrified in 1982 in conjunction with the electrification of the Hakubi Line. The Fukuchiyama to Kinosaki section was electrified in 1986 in conjunction with the electrification of the Fukuchiyama Line. The Sonobe to Fukuchiyama section was electrified between 1985 and 1986, and the Kyoto to Sonobe section in 1990.

=== Former connecting lines ===
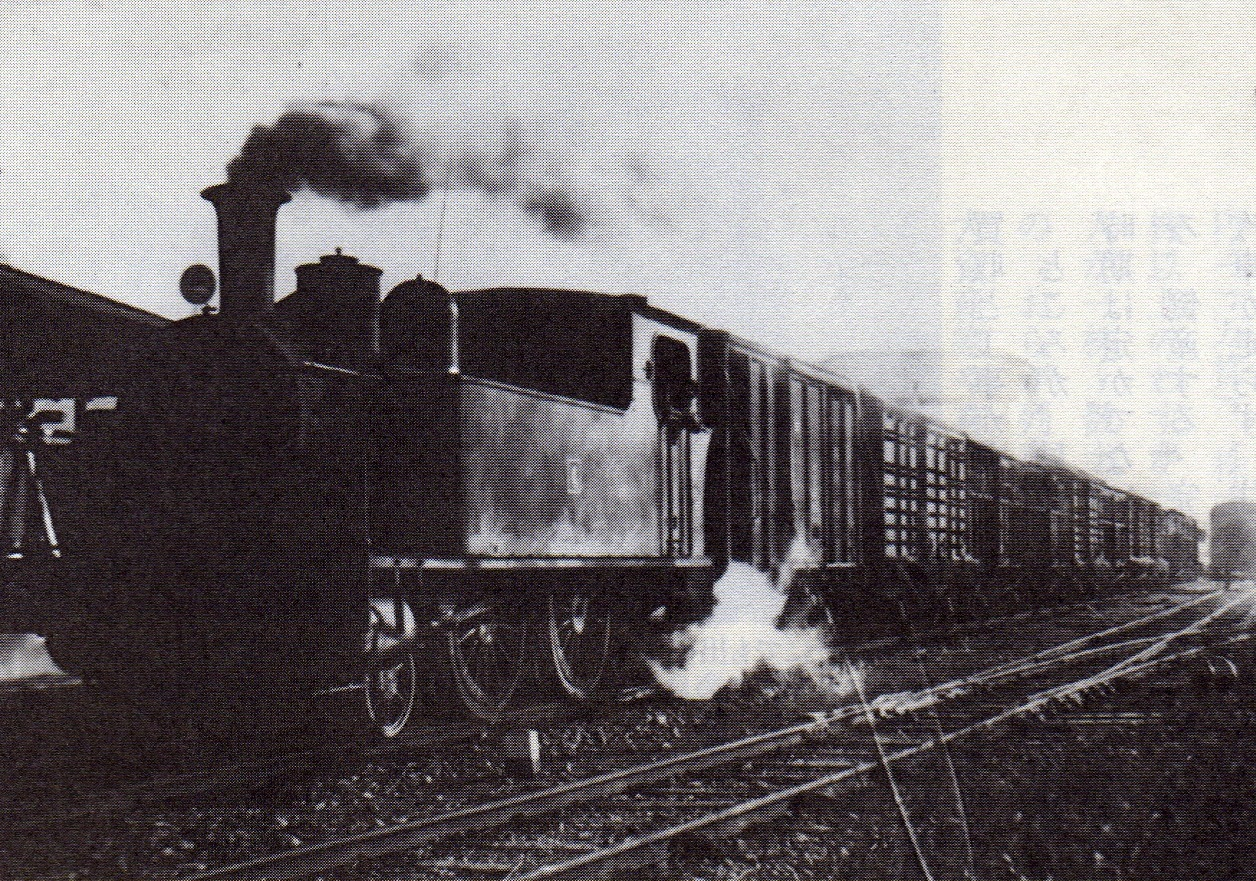
An Izushi Railway train

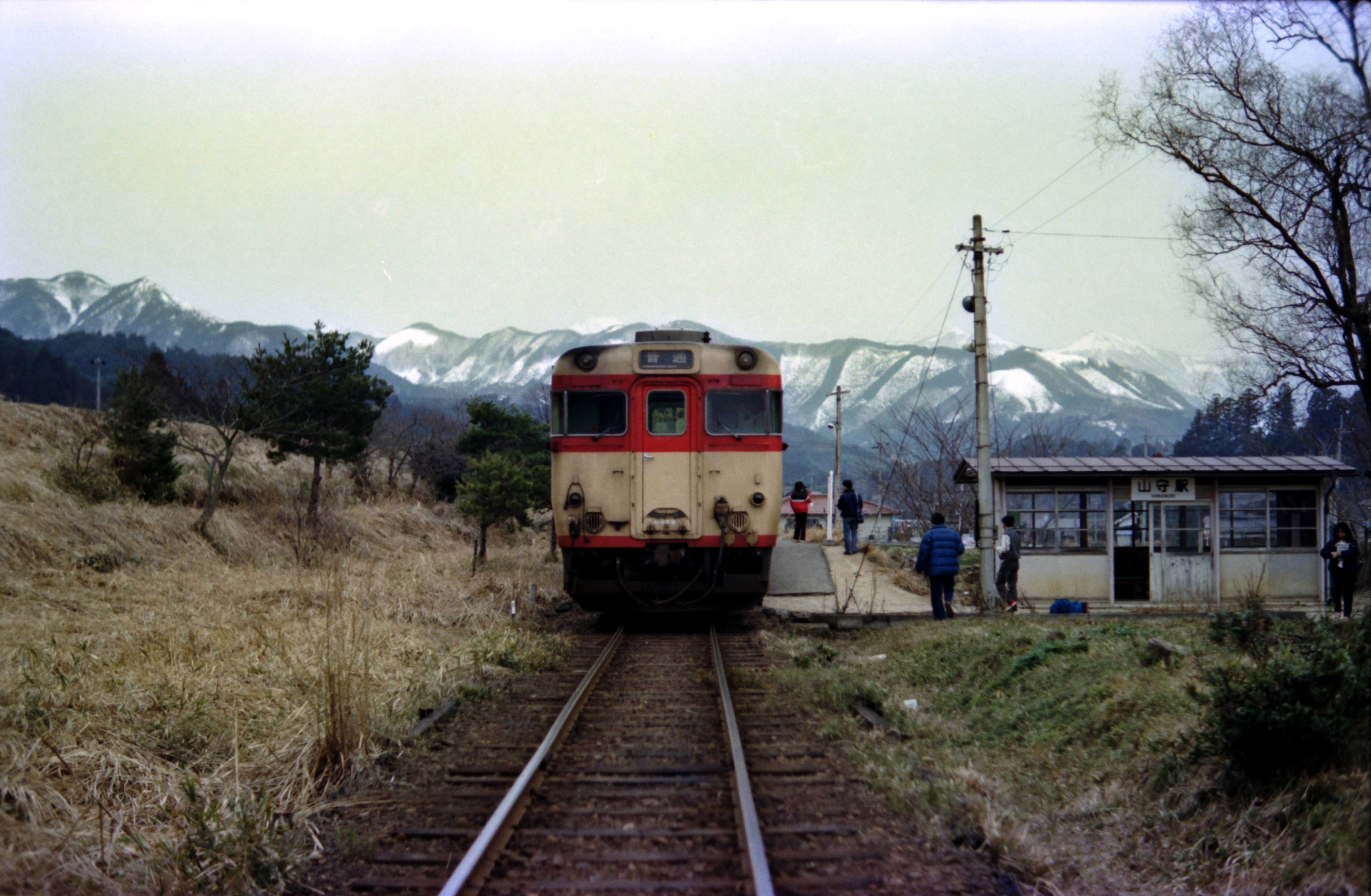
Yamamori Station circa 1981

- Fukuchiyama Station: The Hokutan Railway operated a 12 km (7.5 mi) line to Koumori between 1923 and 1971.
- Ebara Station: The Izushi Railway operated an 11 km (6.8 mi) line to Izushi between 1929 and 1970.
- Iwami Station: The Iwai Prefectural Government opened a 3 km (1.9 mi) 762 mm (2 ft 6 in) gauge line to Iwai Onsen in 1925. In June 1934, 149 of the 216 buildings at Iwai Onsen burnt down, and then in September that year Typhoon Muroto caused such extensive damage to the line that it was out of service until February 1936. In 1944, the line was closed and materials recycled for the Japanese war effort.
- Kurayoshi Station: In 1912, a 4 km (2.5 mi) line to Kamii opened, and was extended 11 km (6.8 mi) to Sekigane in 1941 and a further 5 km (3.1 mi) (as a passenger-only section) to Yamamori in 1958. Freight services ceased in 1974 and the line closed in 1985.
- Yonago Station: The Hakuhi Electric Railway operated a 12 km (7.5 mi) line, electrified at 600 V DC, to Hosshoji between 1924 and 1967. A 6 km (3.7 mi) electrified branch from Aga to Mori operated between 1930 and 1944.
- Arashima Station: The Hirose Railway opened an 8 km (5.0 mi) line, electrified at 600 V DC to Izumo Hirose in 1928. In 1954, the company merged with the Ichibata Electric Railway, and the line closed in 1960.
- Izumoshi Station: On the northern side of the station, the 8 km (5.0 mi) Taisha Line opened in 1912, on the opposite bank of the Ogamogawa to the Izumo-Taisha Station on the Ichibata Electric Railway line. Freight services ceased in 1974, and the line closed in 1990.
- Gotsu Station: The Sanko Line operated 1930 - 2018.
- Nishi-Hamada Station: A 2 km (1.2 mi) freight-only line to Hamada Minato to service the port operated between 1955 and 1982.
- Hatabu Station: The Choshu Railway opened a 27 km (17 mi) line from Higashi-Shimonoseki to Kogushi via Hatabu in 1914. A proposed extension to Nagato was not built due to funding constraints. The part from Hatabu to Kogushi was nationalised in 1925, with the Hatabu station being moved to its present location in 1928, and the line becoming a part of the San'in Main Line in 1933. The remaining 2.2 km (1.4 mi) Choshu Railway line from Hatabu to Higashi-Shimonoseki was electrified at 600 V DC in 1926. The company merged with the Sanyo Electric Railway (today Sanden Kotsu, not to be confused with the eponymous company operating in the Hyōgo Prefecture) in 1928, and the line was extended to Karato in 1932 in order to connect it to the Sanyo Electric Chōfu to Hikoshima-Guchi line. The line was closed in 1971.
