= Hamada Station =

Railway station in Hamada, Shimane Prefecture, Japan

Hamada Station 浜田駅
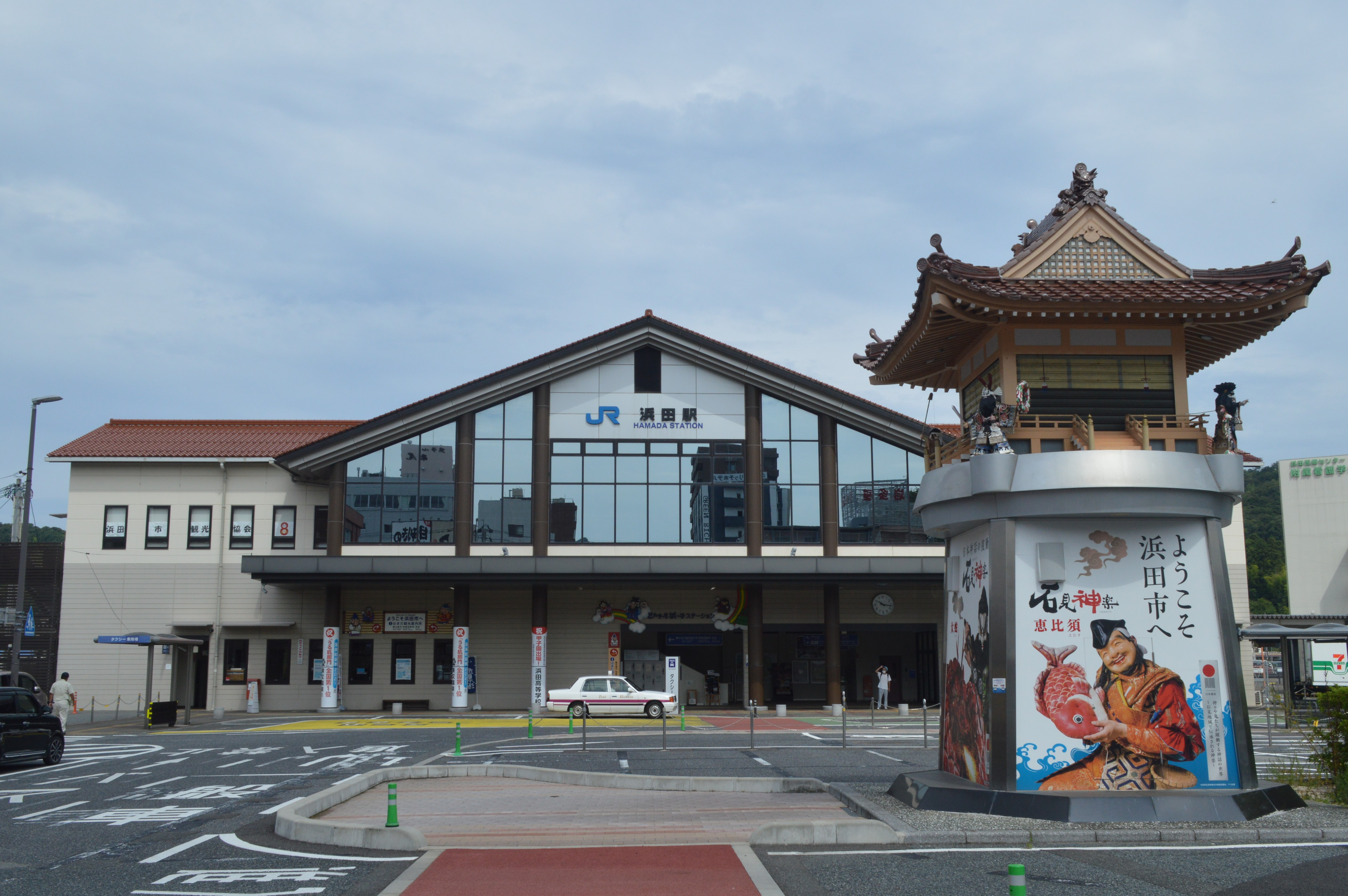
- Hamada Station, August 2022

General information
- Location: 791-2, Asai-chō, Hamada-shi, Shimane-ken 697-0022; Japan
- Coordinates: 34°54′9.4″N 132°5′19.9″E
- Owner: West Japan Railway Company
- Operator: West Japan Railway Company
- Line: D San'in Main Line
- Distance: 473.3 km (294.1 miles) from Kyoto
- Platforms: 1 side + 1 island platform
- Tracks: 3
- Connections: Bus stop

Construction
- Structure type: At grade

Other information
- Status: Staffed
- Website: Official website

History
- Opened: 1 September 1921

Passengers
- FY2020: 543

Services
Preceding station	JR West	Following station
Nishi-Hamada towards Masuda	San'in Line	Shimokō towards Yonago
Location
- Location within Shimane Prefecture Location within Japan

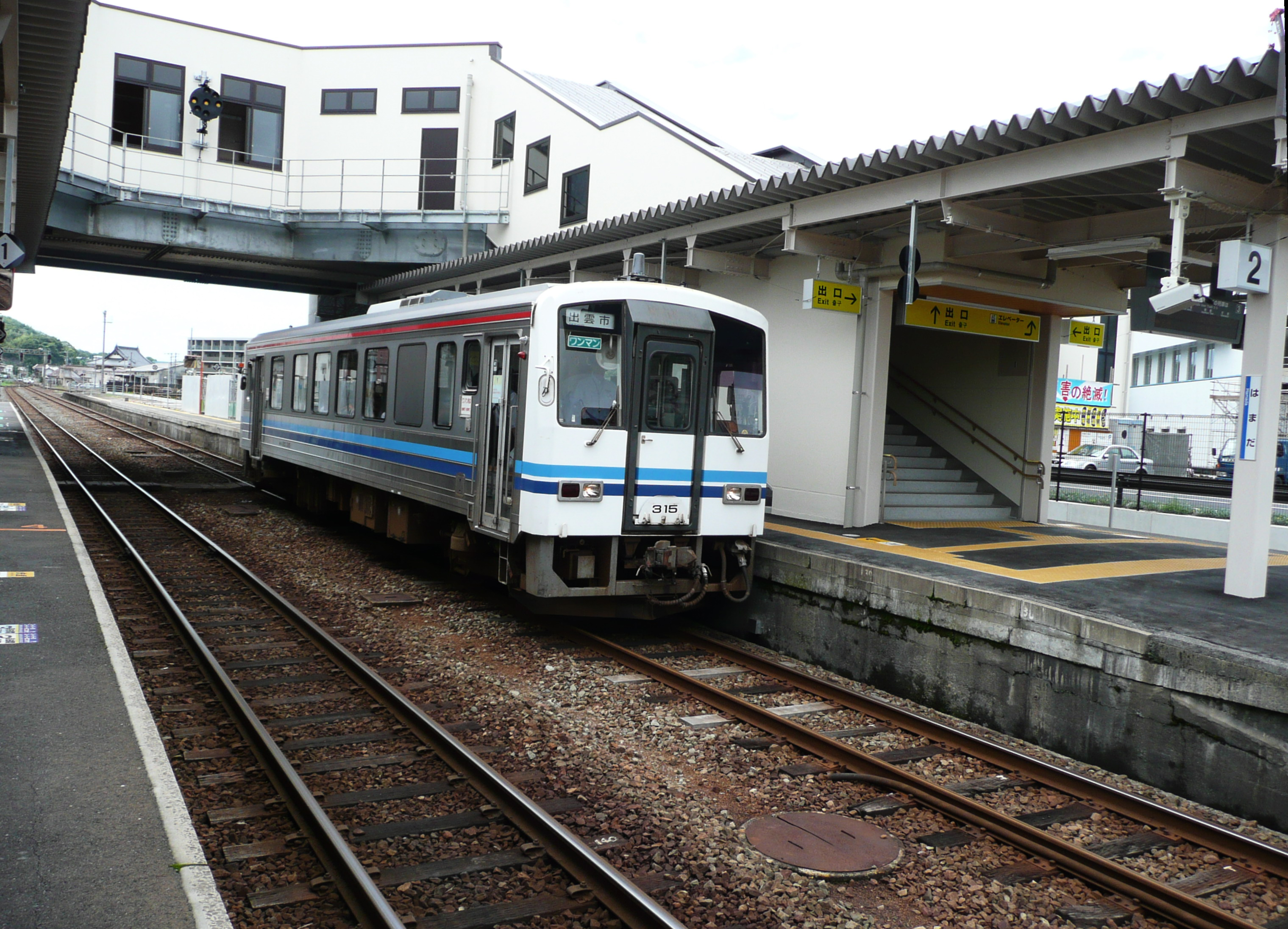
The second track

Hamada Station (浜田駅, Hamada-eki) is a passenger railway station located in the city of Hamada, Shimane Prefecture, Japan. It is operated by the West Japan Railway Company (JR West).

== Lines ==
Hamada Station is served by the JR West San'in Main Line, and is located 473.3 kilometers from the terminus of the line at Kyoto. Only local trains stop at this station.

== Station layout ==
The station consists of one side platform and one island platform, connected by a footbridge. The station is staffed.

== Platforms ==
1	■ D San'in Main Line	for Masuda and Shin-Yamaguchi
2, 3	■ D San'in Main Line	for Izumoshi and Matsue

== History ==
Hamada Station was opened on 1 September 1921 when the San'in Main Line was extended from Tsunozu Station. The line was further extended to Sufu Station on 10 March 1922. Freight operations were discontinued on 31 December 1983. With the privatization of the Japan National Railway (JNR) on 1 April 1987, the station came under the aegis of the West Japan railway Company (JR West).

== Passenger statistics ==
In fiscal 2020, the station was used by an average of 543 passengers daily.

== Surrounding area ==
- Shimane Prefectural Gymnasium
- Hamada City Athletic Stadium
- National Hospital Organization Hamada Medical Center
- Shimane Prefectural Hamada High School
- Hamada Municipal First Junior High School

== See also ==
- List of railway stations in Japan
