= Hagi, Yamaguchi =

Hagi 萩市
- City
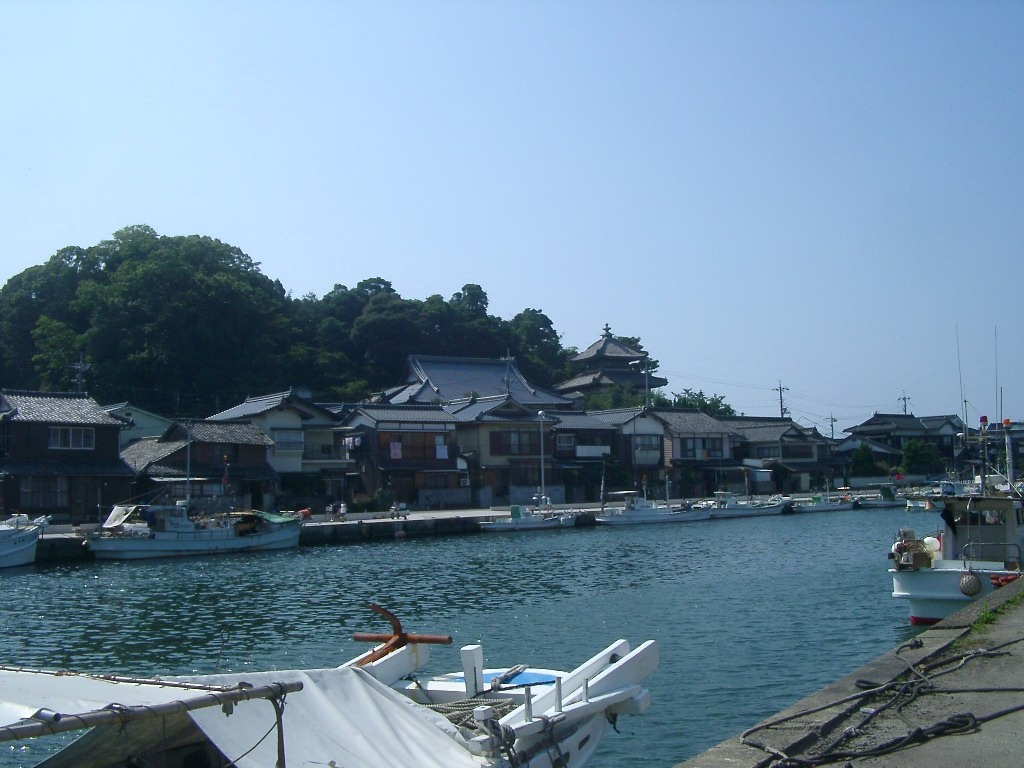
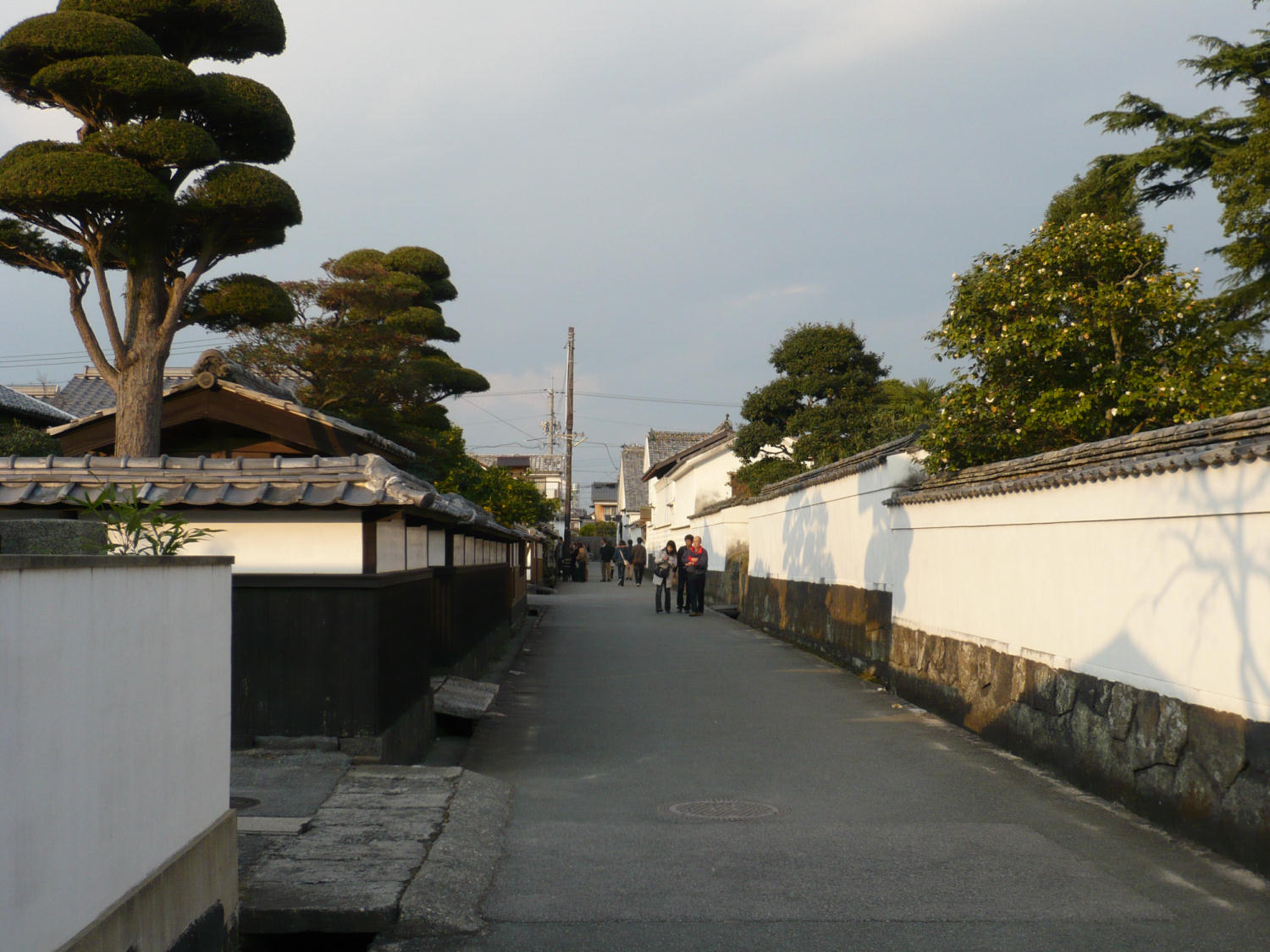
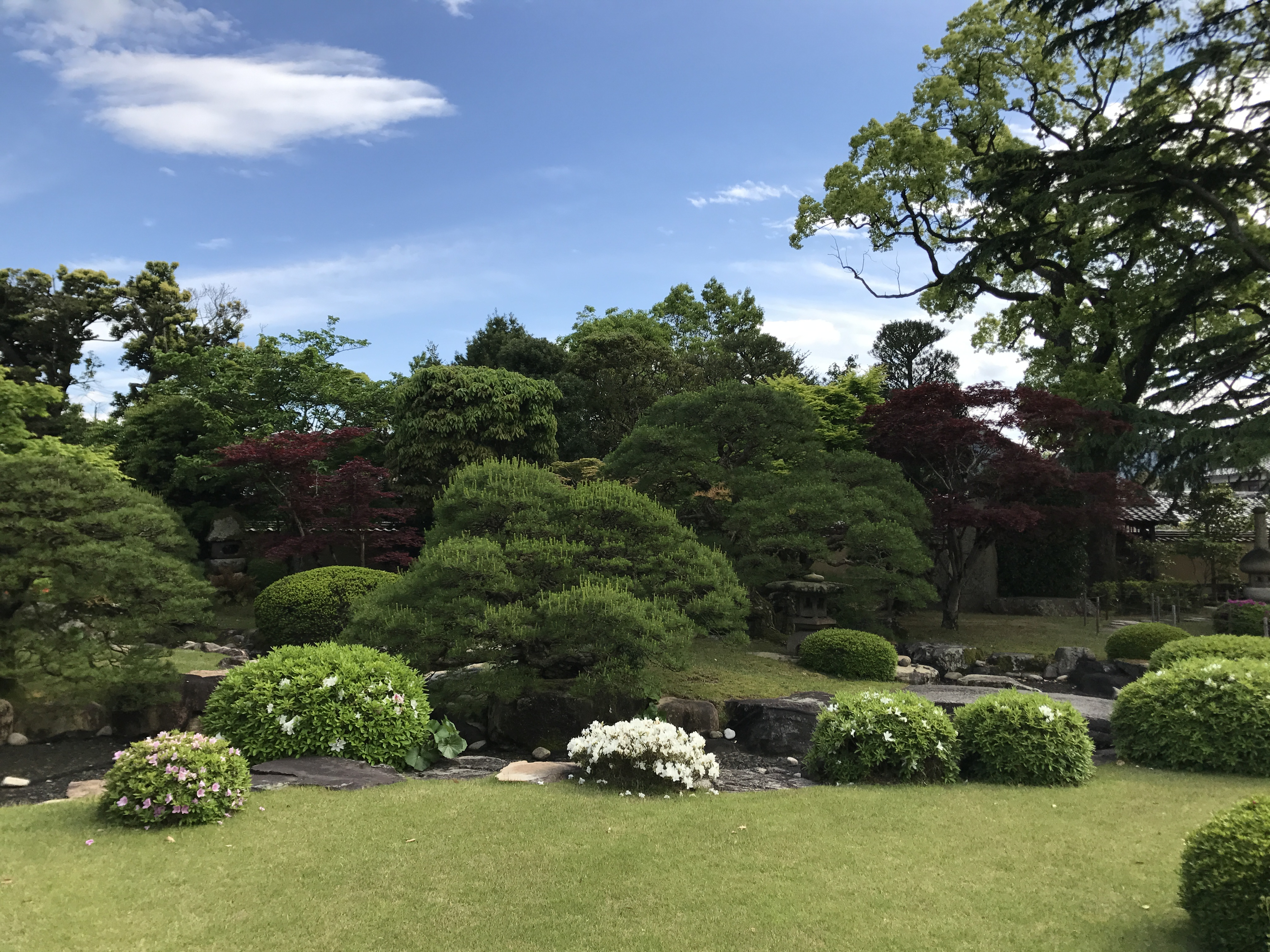
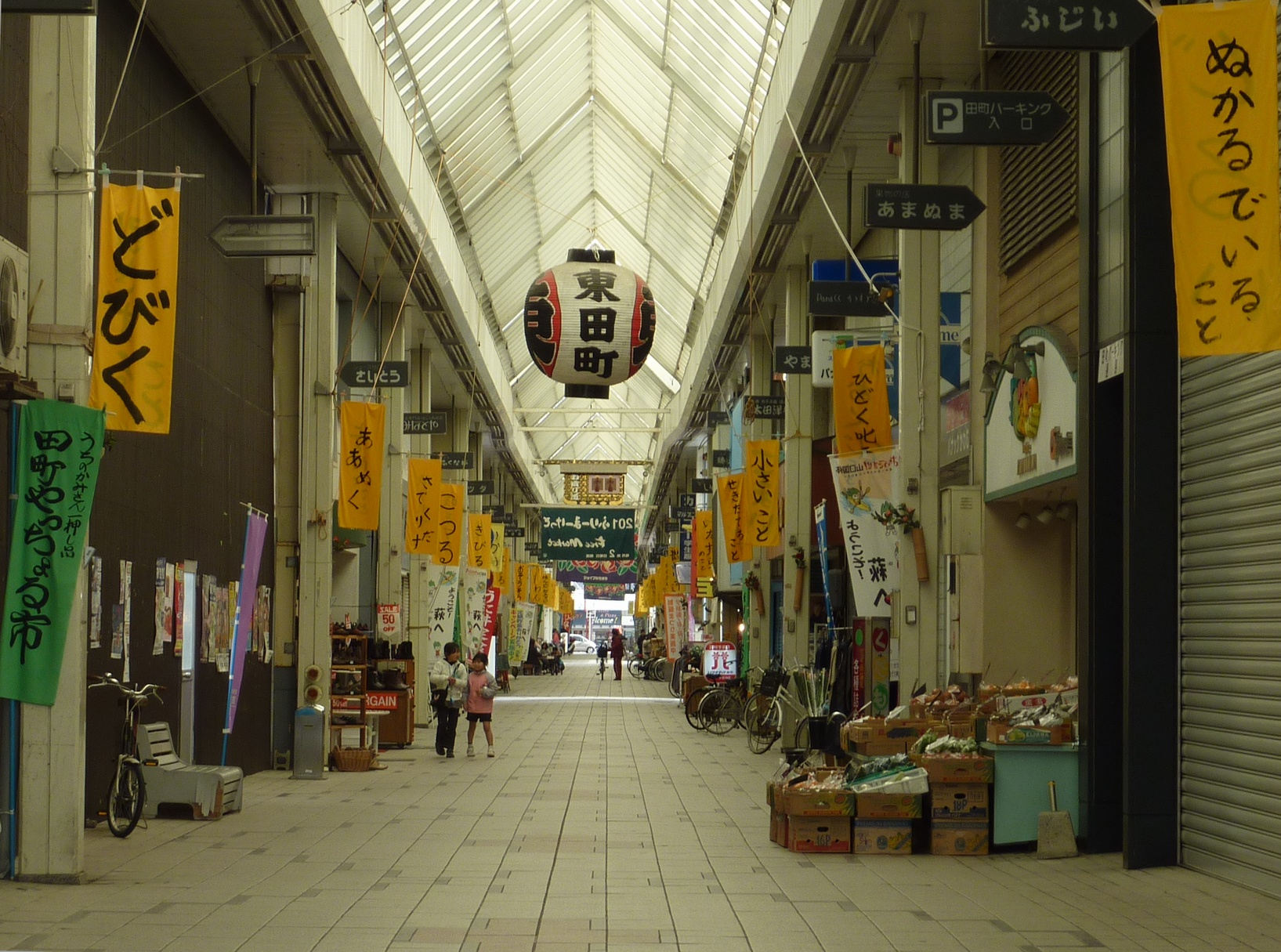
- Tamae Fishing Port Hagi Castle Town Kikuya Family Garden Tamachi Shopping Street

- Flag Emblem
- Interactive map of Hagi
- Location in Japan
- Coordinates: 34°24′29″N 131°23′57″E
- Country: Japan
- Region: Chūgoku (San'yō)
- Prefecture: Yamaguchi
- Hagi Town: April 1, 1889
- Hagi City: July 1, 1932

Government
  - Mayor: Fumio Tanaka (from Mar 2021)

Area
  - Total: 698.31 km^{2} (269.62 sq mi)

Population (April 30, 2023)
  - Total: 43,233
  - Density: 61.911/km^{2} (160.35/sq mi)
- Time zone: UTC+09:00 (JST)
- City hall address: 510 Emukai, Hagi-shi, Yamaguchi-ken 758-8555
- Climate: Cfa
- Website: Official website
- Symbols
- Flower: Camellia japonica and Lespedeza
- Fruit: Natsumikan
- Tree: Chamaecyparis obtusa and Pine

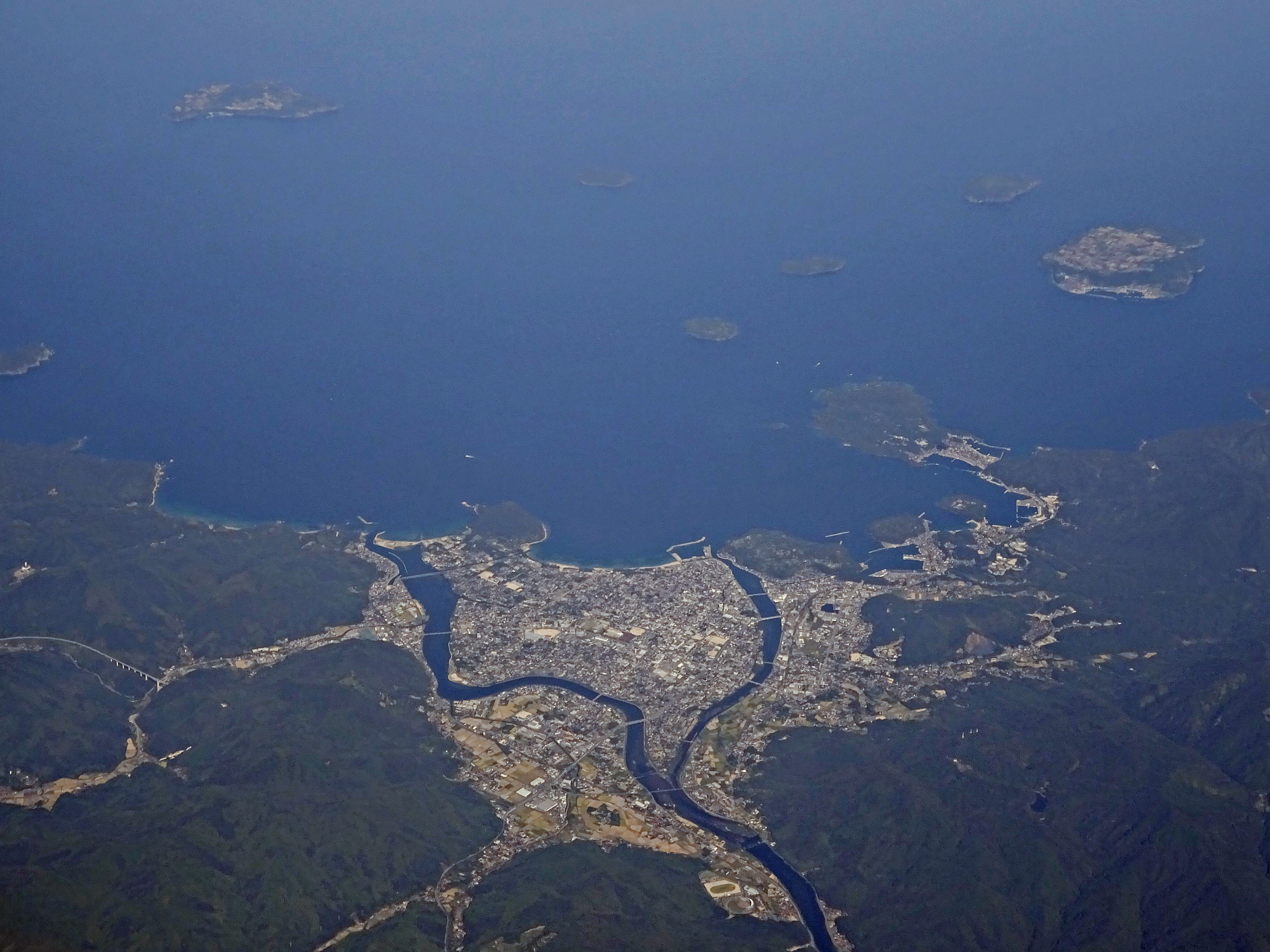
Aerial view of central Hagi

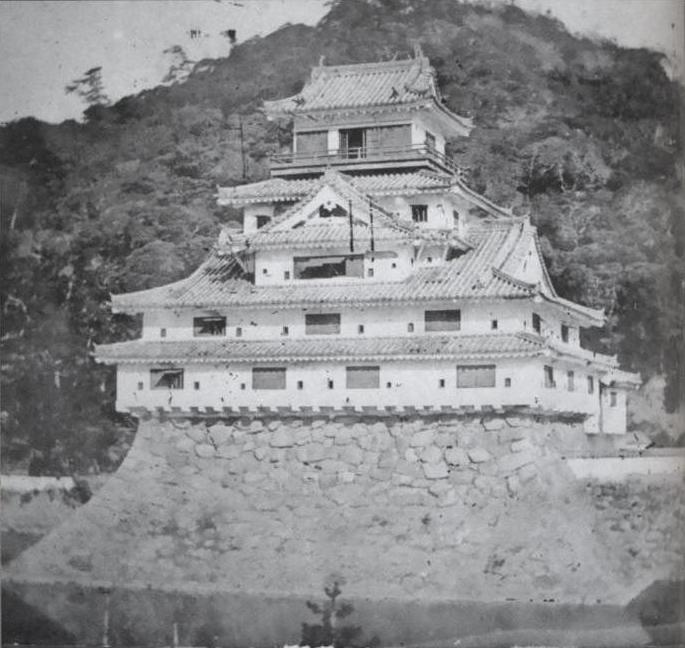
Main keep (tenshu) of Hagi Castle, before 1880

Hagi (萩市, Hagi-shi; Japanese pronunciation: [hä́.ɡ̟ʲì, -ŋ̟ʲì, hä̀.ɡ̟ʲí.ɕì, -ŋ̟ʲí-], (Note: This placename is only pronounced like this. The homographic common noun is additionally pronounced [hä̀.ɡ̟ʲí, -ŋ̟ʲí].) locally [hä̀.ŋʲí]) is a city located in Yamaguchi Prefecture, Japan. As of 30 April 2023, the city had an estimated population of 43,233 in 22,803 households and a population density of 62 persons per km². The total area of the city is 698.31 square kilometres (269.62 sq mi). It is known for being the birthplace of Hagi ware, a type of Japanese pottery.

== Geography ==
Facing the Sea of Japan on one side and being surrounded by mountains on three sides, the center of Hagi is located on one of the largest delta areas in Japan. The Abu River splits into two, forming the Hashimoto River and the Matsumoto River. Outlying islands include Mishima, Oshima, Aishima, Hitsushima, Hashima, Hisima, and Oshima. of which Ainoshima and Hitsushima are inhabited.

=== Neighboring municipalities ===
Shimane Prefecture

- Masuda
- Tsuwano

Yamaguchi Prefecture

- Abu
- Nagato
- Yamaguchi

== Climate ==
Hagi has a humid subtropical climate (Köppen Cfa) with hot, humid and wet summers combined with cool to mild winters, with a relatively high precipitation amount compared to mainland Asian locations on similar latitudes.

Climate data for Hagi (1991−2020 normals, extremes 1948−present)
Month	Jan	Feb	Mar	Apr	May	Jun	Jul	Aug	Sep	Oct	Nov	Dec	Year
Record high °C (°F)	19.2 (66.6)	23.6 (74.5)	26.6 (79.9)	30.7 (87.3)	33.0 (91.4)	35.2 (95.4)	37.3 (99.1)	38.3 (100.9)	37.4 (99.3)	32.2 (90.0)	27.3 (81.1)	24.2 (75.6)	38.3 (100.9)
Mean maximum °C (°F)	15.2 (59.4)	18.0 (64.4)	21.6 (70.9)	26.1 (79.0)	29.4 (84.9)	31.8 (89.2)	34.8 (94.6)	35.6 (96.1)	32.7 (90.9)	28.2 (82.8)	23.2 (73.8)	17.7 (63.9)	35.9 (96.6)
Mean daily maximum °C (°F)	9.4 (48.9)	10.4 (50.7)	13.7 (56.7)	18.4 (65.1)	22.9 (73.2)	25.7 (78.3)	30.1 (86.2)	31.1 (88.0)	27.2 (81.0)	22.4 (72.3)	17.3 (63.1)	11.8 (53.2)	20.0 (68.1)
Daily mean °C (°F)	5.7 (42.3)	6.4 (43.5)	9.1 (48.4)	13.6 (56.5)	18.3 (64.9)	21.9 (71.4)	26.2 (79.2)	27.0 (80.6)	23.1 (73.6)	17.7 (63.9)	12.8 (55.0)	8.0 (46.4)	15.8 (60.5)
Mean daily minimum °C (°F)	2.4 (36.3)	2.5 (36.5)	4.6 (40.3)	8.8 (47.8)	13.9 (57.0)	18.6 (65.5)	23.0 (73.4)	23.8 (74.8)	19.8 (67.6)	13.7 (56.7)	8.6 (47.5)	4.3 (39.7)	12.0 (53.6)
Mean minimum °C (°F)	−1.0 (30.2)	−1.1 (30.0)	0.0 (32.0)	2.8 (37.0)	8.1 (46.6)	13.8 (56.8)	19.0 (66.2)	19.7 (67.5)	14.3 (57.7)	8.3 (46.9)	3.6 (38.5)	0.5 (32.9)	−2.0 (28.4)
Record low °C (°F)	−5.8 (21.6)	−6.8 (19.8)	−3.9 (25.0)	−0.3 (31.5)	3.0 (37.4)	8.6 (47.5)	12.2 (54.0)	15.2 (59.4)	8.1 (46.6)	3.9 (39.0)	0.6 (33.1)	−3.8 (25.2)	−6.8 (19.8)
Average precipitation mm (inches)	94.5 (3.72)	76.3 (3.00)	124.5 (4.90)	120.4 (4.74)	134.7 (5.30)	206.5 (8.13)	273.5 (10.77)	178.0 (7.01)	201.4 (7.93)	107.5 (4.23)	88.8 (3.50)	86.9 (3.42)	1,692.9 (66.65)
Average snowfall cm (inches)	3 (1.2)	2 (0.8)	0 (0)	0 (0)	0 (0)	0 (0)	0 (0)	0 (0)	0 (0)	0 (0)	0 (0)	trace	5 (2.0)
Average precipitation days (≥ 1.0 mm)	10.8	10.2	11.5	10.1	8.7	11.4	10.7	9.0	10.2	8.1	8.9	10.6	120.2
Average snowy days (≥ 1 cm)	0.9	0.6	0	0	0	0	0	0	0	0	0	0.2	1.7
Average relative humidity (%)	70	69	69	70	71	80	78	78	79	76	73	71	74
Mean monthly sunshine hours	76.6	94.4	147.3	177.4	204.6	139.1	171.8	206.3	152.4	160.8	119.2	83.3	1,733.2
Source: Japan Meteorological Agency

Climate data for Susa, Hagi (1991−2020 normals, extremes 1977−present)
Month	Jan	Feb	Mar	Apr	May	Jun	Jul	Aug	Sep	Oct	Nov	Dec	Year
Record high °C (°F)	19.5 (67.1)	23.2 (73.8)	27.0 (80.6)	30.0 (86.0)	31.2 (88.2)	34.8 (94.6)	36.8 (98.2)	38.4 (101.1)	36.4 (97.5)	32.0 (89.6)	26.7 (80.1)	24.4 (75.9)	38.4 (101.1)
Mean daily maximum °C (°F)	8.9 (48.0)	9.8 (49.6)	12.9 (55.2)	17.8 (64.0)	22.4 (72.3)	25.3 (77.5)	29.2 (84.6)	30.6 (87.1)	26.5 (79.7)	21.7 (71.1)	16.7 (62.1)	11.4 (52.5)	19.4 (67.0)
Daily mean °C (°F)	5.1 (41.2)	5.4 (41.7)	8.0 (46.4)	12.6 (54.7)	17.2 (63.0)	21.0 (69.8)	25.2 (77.4)	26.0 (78.8)	21.9 (71.4)	16.4 (61.5)	11.6 (52.9)	7.1 (44.8)	14.8 (58.6)
Mean daily minimum °C (°F)	0.9 (33.6)	0.6 (33.1)	2.4 (36.3)	6.6 (43.9)	11.6 (52.9)	16.9 (62.4)	21.6 (70.9)	22.1 (71.8)	17.7 (63.9)	11.3 (52.3)	6.4 (43.5)	2.6 (36.7)	10.1 (50.1)
Record low °C (°F)	−6.2 (20.8)	−7.1 (19.2)	−4.8 (23.4)	−2.9 (26.8)	1.1 (34.0)	6.5 (43.7)	12.6 (54.7)	14.9 (58.8)	7.1 (44.8)	2.2 (36.0)	−2.3 (27.9)	−3.7 (25.3)	−7.1 (19.2)
Average precipitation mm (inches)	102.8 (4.05)	85.8 (3.38)	137.1 (5.40)	124.7 (4.91)	142.2 (5.60)	209.1 (8.23)	274.2 (10.80)	164.8 (6.49)	208.0 (8.19)	117.3 (4.62)	102.7 (4.04)	107.9 (4.25)	1,776.6 (69.94)
Average precipitation days (≥ 1.0 mm)	12.8	11.5	12.5	10.7	9.7	11.7	11.3	9.0	10.7	9.4	10.9	12.7	132.9
Mean monthly sunshine hours	66.8	88.5	146.7	183.6	206.9	144.7	173.7	203.8	148.9	157.4	111.3	72.2	1,704.6
Source: Japan Meteorological Agency

== Population ==
Hagi’s population has declined in recent years due to limited income opportunities.

Historical population
Year	Pop.	±% p.a.
1955	97,744	—
1960	93,245	−0.94%
1970	77,962	−1.77%
1980	74,846	−0.41%
1990	68,999	−0.81%
1995	65,293	−1.10%
2000	61,745	−1.11%
2005	57,989	−1.25%
2010	53,606	−1.56%

== History ==
The area of Hagi was part of ancient Nagato Province. During the Muromachi period, the Yoshimi clan built a minor fortification at a fishing village where the city is now located. During the Edo Period, the area was the center of Chōshū Domain, with the Mōri clan ruling as daimyō from their stronghold at Hagi Castle for 250 years. The samurai of Chōshū Domain played a major role in the Meiji restoration of the 1860s, and many leaders of the Meiji government came from this city. The Hagi Rebellion of 1876 was staged by former samurai unhappy with the changes to their status under the new regime. The town of Hagi within Abu District, Yamaguchi was established on April 1, 1889 with the creation of the modern municipalities system. Hagi was raised to city status on July 1, 1932.

On March 6, 2005, Hagi absorbed the towns of Susa and Tamagawa, and the villages of Asahi, Fukue, Kawakami and Mutsumi (all from Abu District) to create the new, expanded city of Hagi.

== Government ==
Hagi has a mayor-council form of government with a directly elected mayor and a unicameral city council of 20 members. Hagi, collectively with the town of Abu, contributes two members to the Yamaguchi Prefectural Assembly. In terms of national politics, the city is part of the Yamaguchi 3rd district of the lower house of the Diet of Japan.

=== Military ===
Hagi is home to the Ground Self-Defense Force's Mutsumi Training Area, and is a proposed installation site for the Aegis Ashore missile defense system.

== Economy ==
The main industries in Hagi are tourism, agriculture and commercial fishing. Industrial development has been greatly hampered by poor transportation and logistics connections, although a number of industrial parks have been established.

== Education ==
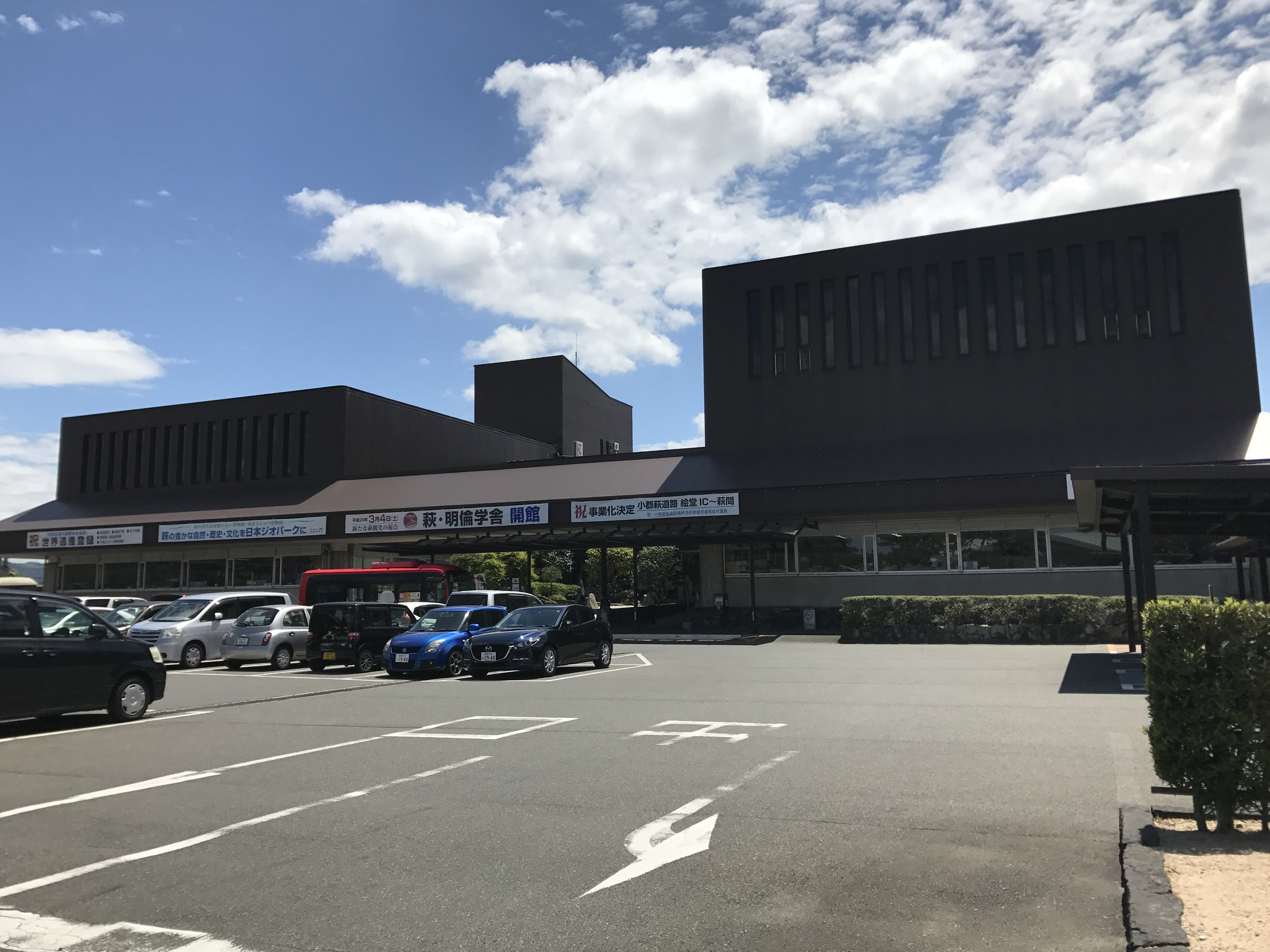
Hagi City Hall

Hagi has 20 public elementary schools and 14 public junior high schools operated by the city government, and two public high schools operated by the Yamaguchi Prefectural Board of Education. There are also one private junior high school and one private high school. The prefecture also operated one special education school for the handicapped. The Yamaguchi University of Human Welfare and Culture is located in Hagi.

== Transportation ==
The development of the transportation network in Hagi is the slowest in Yamaguchi Prefecture, and access to Shinkansen, expressway networks, and airports is particularly inconvenient. The nearest Shinkansen station, Shin-Yamaguchi is about an hour away by bus, and the nearest airport, Iwami Airport in Masuda, Shimane Prefecture is also an hour away.

=== Railway ===
JR West (JR West) - San'in Main Line

- Esaki - Susa - Utagō - Kiyo - Nago - Nagato-Ōi - Koshigahama - Higashi-Hagi - Hagi - Tamae - Sammi - Ii

=== Highways ===
- National Route 191
- National Route 262
- National Route 315
- National Route 490

== Local attractions ==
=== Hagi Castle Town ===
Declared a National Historic Site in 1967, the castle town of Hagi Castle remains largely intact and unchanged from the end of the Edo Period. This area includes distinctive walled streets and former samurai residences.

=== Hagi Pottery (Hagiyaki) ===
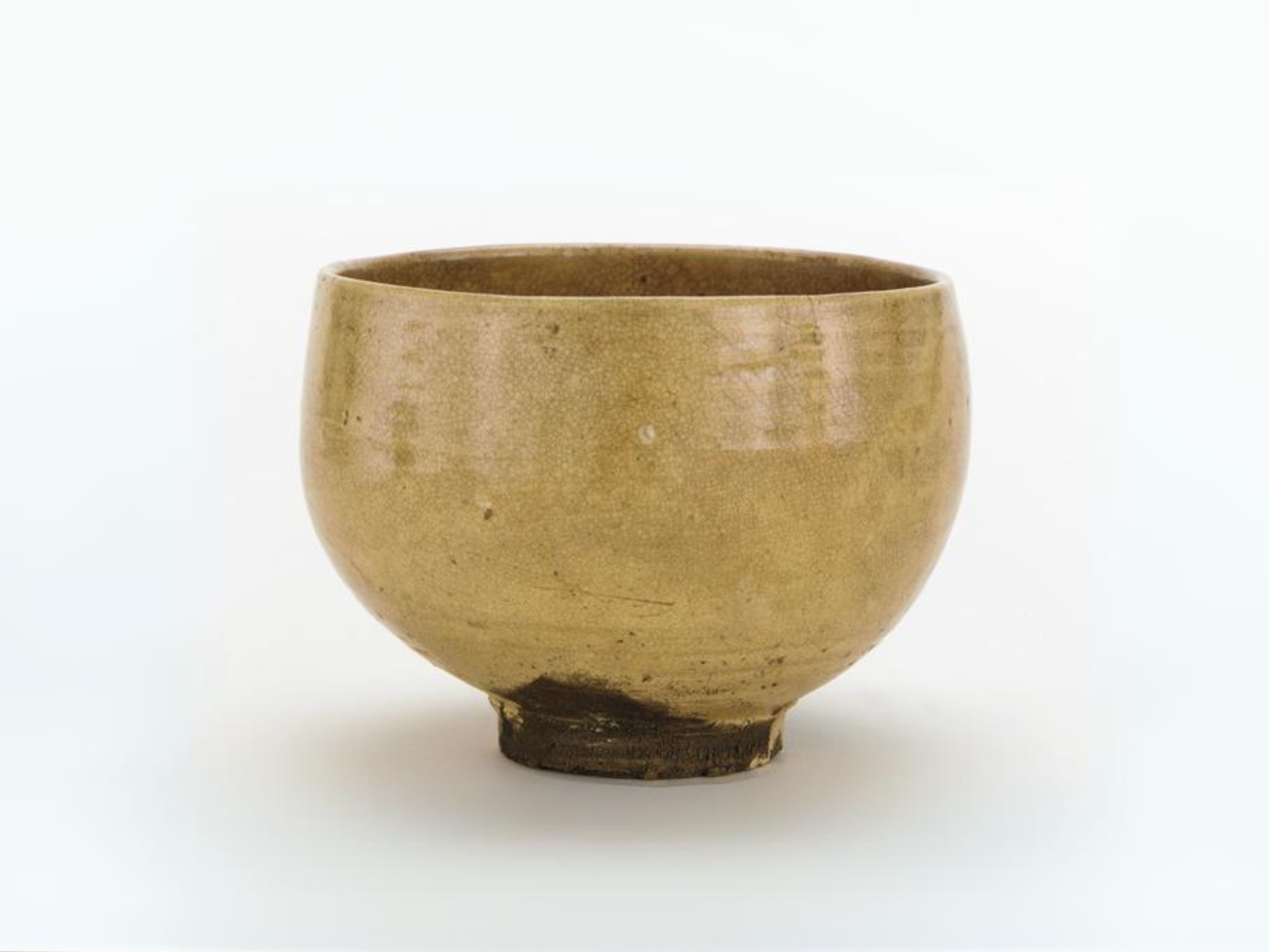
Hagi ware tea bowl (chawan), Edo period, 18th-19th century

Hagi is renowned for Hagi ware, a form of Japanese pottery dating from 1604 when two Korean potters were brought to Hagi by Mōri Terumoto.

== Sister cities ==
- Ulsan, South Korea, since 1968.

== Noted people from Hagi ==
- Yamagata Aritomo, former prime minister of Japan.
- Tanaka Giichi, former prime minister of Japan.
- Inoue Masaru, known as the "Father of the Japanese Railways".
- Omura Masujiro, Bakumatsu-era military leader and theorist.
- Takasugi Shinsaku, samurai and founder of the Kiheitai.
- Yoshida Shōin (1830–1859), intellectual, teacher and revolutionary
- Kido Takayoshi, Japanese statesman and one of the Three Great Nobles.
- Katsura Taro, former prime minister of Japan.
