= Nagato-Misumi Station =

Railway station in Nagato, Yamaguchi Prefecture, Japan

Nagato-Misumi Station 長門三隅駅
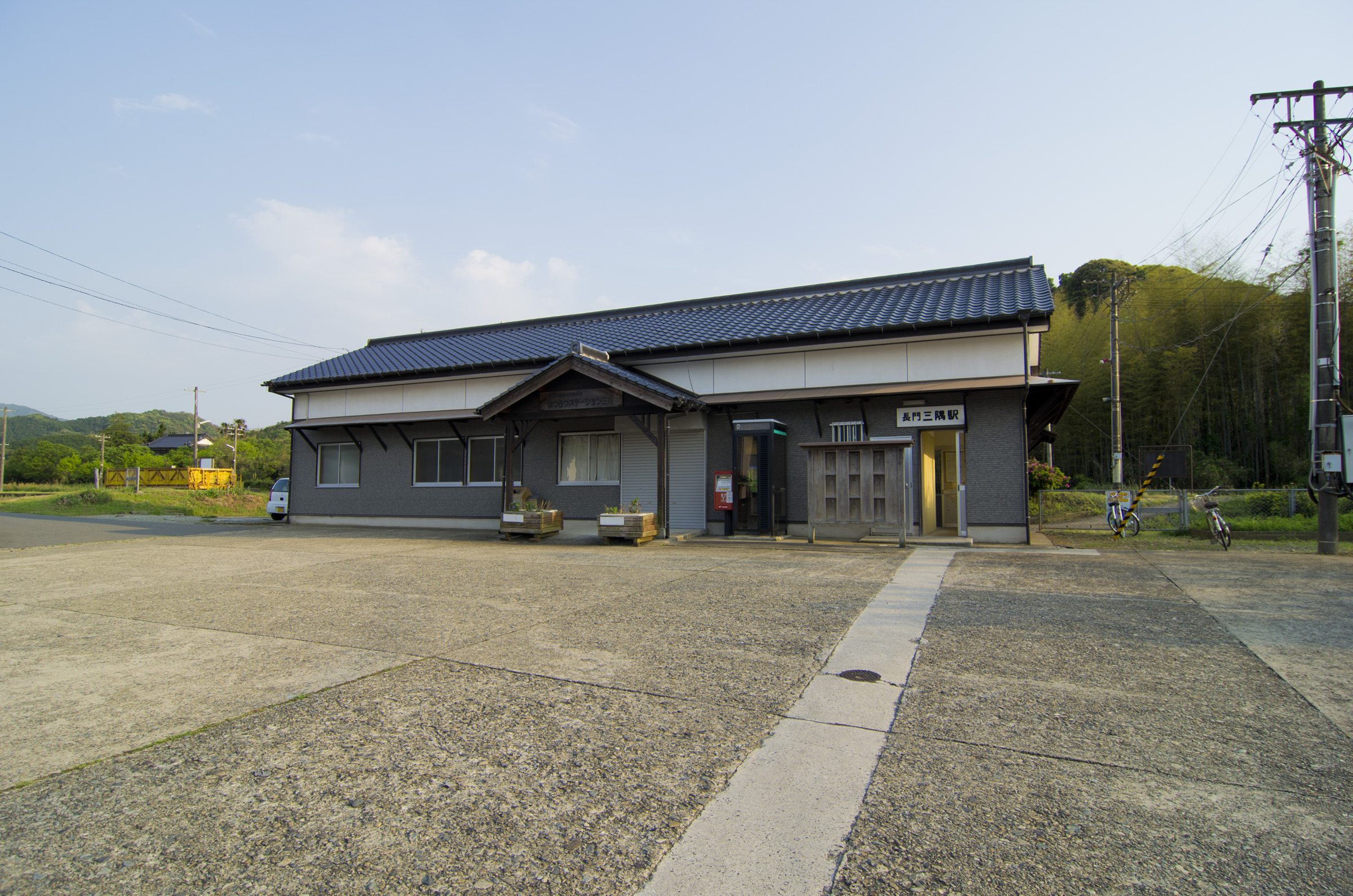
- Nagato-Misumi Station in May 2012

General information
- Location: 1453, Misumishimo, Nagato-shi, Yamaguchi-ken 759-3803; Japan
- Coordinates: 34°21′59.53″N 131°14′10.25″E
- Owner: West Japan Railway Company
- Operator: West Japan Railway Company
- Line: San'in Main Line
- Distance: 594.5 km (369.4 miles) from Kyoto
- Platforms: 2 side platforms
- Tracks: 2
- Connections: Bus stop

Other information
- Status: Unstaffed
- Website: Official website

History
- Opened: 3 November 1924; 102 years ago

Passengers
- FY2020: 43

Services
Preceding station	JR West	Following station
Nagatoshi towards Shimonoseki	San'in Main Line E Local	Ii towards Masuda
Location
- Location within Yamaguchi Prefecture Location within Japan

Nagato-Misumi Station (長門三隅駅, Nagato-Misumi-eki) is a passenger railway station located in the city of Nagato, Yamaguchi Prefecture, Japan. It is operated by the West Japan Railway Company (JR West).

== Lines ==
Nagato-Misumi Station is served by the JR West San'in Main Line, and is located 594.5 kilometers from the terminus of the line at Kyoto.

== Station layout ==
The station consists of two opposed side platforms, connected to the old wooden station building by a footbridge. The station is unattended.

== Platforms ==
1	■ San'in Main Line	for Higashi-Hagi and Masuda
2	■ San'in Main Line	for Nagatoshi and Shimonoseki

== History ==
Nagato-Misumi Station was opened on 3 November 1924 when the Japan Government Railways Mine Line was extended from Masaakishi Station (now Nagatoshi Station). The line was further extended to Hagi Station on 3 April 1925. The station building was destroyed by fire on 12 December 1932. This portion of the Mine Line was incorporated into the San'in Main Line on 24 February 1933. Freight operations were discontinued on 31 March 1977. With the privatization of the Japan National Railway (JNR) on 1 April 1987, the station came under the aegis of the West Japan railway Company (JR West).

== Passenger statistics ==
In fiscal 2020, the station was used by an average of 43 passengers daily.

== Surrounding area ==
- Murata Seifu Memorial Museum
- Nagato Municipal Misumi Junior High School

== See also ==
- List of railway stations in Japan
