= Nago Station =

Railway station in Abu, Yamaguchi Prefecture, Japan

Nago Station 奈古駅
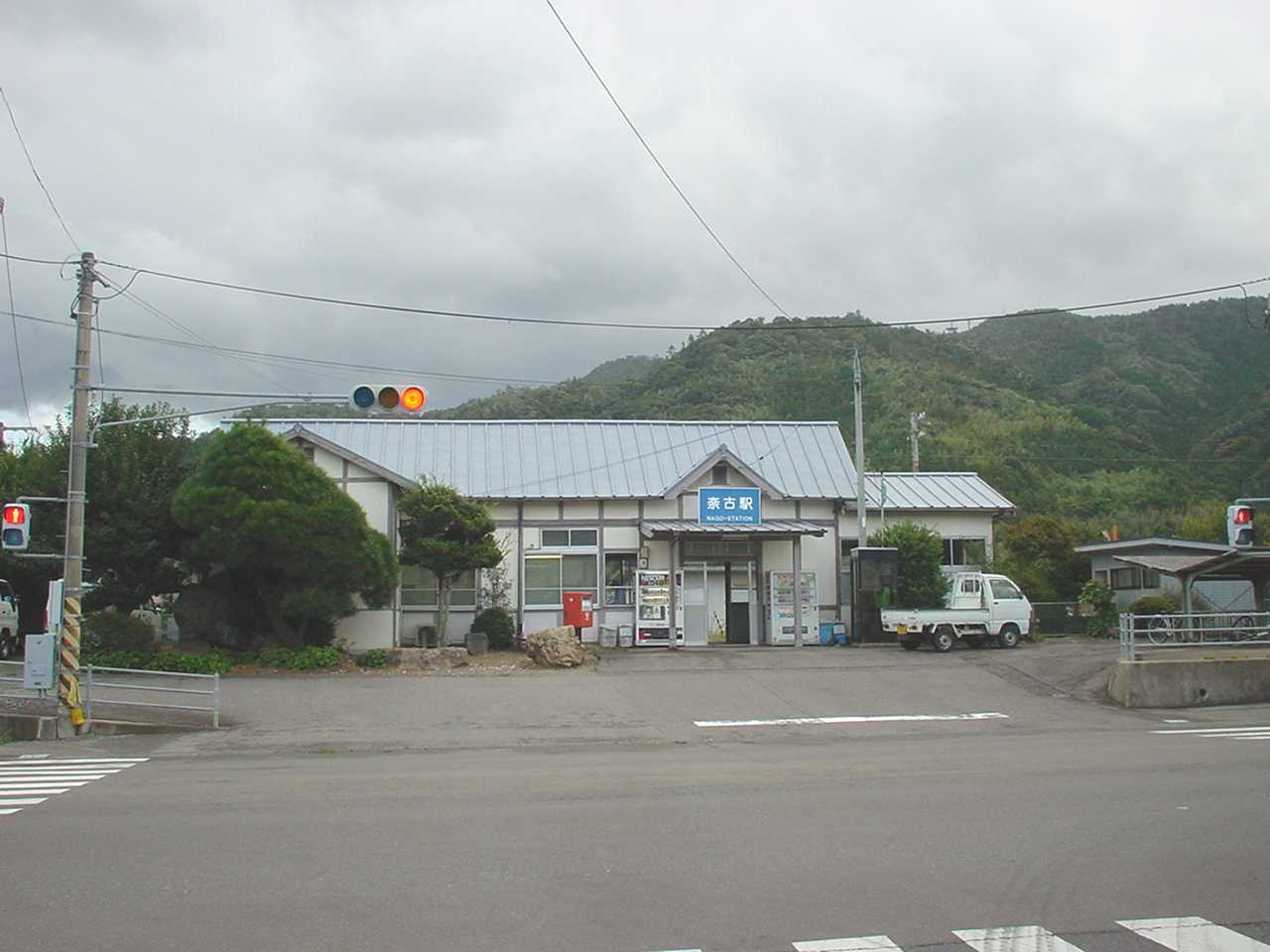
- Nago Station in October 2005

General information
- Location: 2844 Nago Okadabashi, Abu-gun, Abu-cho, Yamaguchi-ken 759-3622; Japan
- Coordinates: 34°30′10.82″N 131°28′21.73″E
- Owner: West Japan Railway Company
- Operator: West Japan Railway Company
- Line: San'in Main Line
- Distance: 560.2 km (348.1 miles) from Kyoto
- Platforms: 1 side platform
- Tracks: 1
- Connections: Bus stop

Other information
- Status: Staffed
- Website: Official website

History
- Opened: 24 April 1929; 97 years ago

Passengers
- FY2020: 81

Services
Preceding station	JR West	Following station
Nagato-Ōi towards Shimonoseki	San'in Main Line E Local	Kiyo towards Masuda
Location
- Location within Yamaguchi Prefecture Location within Japan

Nago Station (奈古駅, Nago-eki) is a passenger railway station located in the town of Abu, Abu District, Yamaguchi Prefecture, Japan. It is operated by the West Japan Railway Company (JR West).

== Lines ==
Nago Station is served by the JR West San'in Main Line, and is located 560.2 kilometers from the terminus of the line at Kyoto. Only local trains stop at this station.

== Station layout ==
The station consists of one side platform with the station building on the right side when facing in the direction of Nagatoshi Station. It used to have a two opposed side platforms but from February 18, 2012 the platform on the opposite side of the station building was discontinued and the footbridge connecting the platforms was removed. The station is staffed.

== History ==
Nago Station was opened on 24 April 1929 as the terminal station of the Japan Government Railways Mine Line when the line was extended from Higashi-Hagi Station. The line was further extended to Utagō Station on 15 November 1931. This portion of the Mine Line was incorporated into the San'in Main Line on 24 February 1933. Freight operations were discontinued on 31 March 1979. The station was out of operation from 24 October 1980 to 5 March 1981 due to damage to the line caused by torrential rains. With the privatization of the Japan National Railway (JNR) on 1 April 1987, the station came under the aegis of the West Japan railway Company (JR West).

== Passenger statistics ==
In fiscal 2020, the station was used by an average of 81 passengers daily.

== Surrounding area ==
- Abu Town Hall
- Yamaguchi Prefectural Hagi High School Nago Branch
- Abu Municipal Abu Junior High School
- Abu Municipal Abu Elementary School

== See also ==
- List of railway stations in Japan
