= Shirasu Tatara Steelworks =

Steelworks in Abu, Yamaguchi, Japan

- 白須たたら製鉄遺跡 (Japanese)
- Shirasu Tatara Steelworks Shirasu Tatara Steelworks (Japan)
- Interactive map of Shirasu Tatara Steelworks
- 34°35′09″N 131°35′25″E
- Type: Industrial site
- Periods: Edo period
- Location: Abu, Yamaguchi, Japan
- Region: San'yō region

History
- Built: c.19th century

Site notes
- Public access: Yes (no facilities)

The Shirasu Tatara Steelworks (白須たたら製鉄遺跡, Shirasu tatara seitetsu iseki) was a premodern steelworks for the production of tatara steel located in the Sogo neighborhood of the town of Abu, Yamaguchi Prefecture in the San'yō region of Japan. The site was designated a National Historic Site of Japan in 1982.

== History ==
Tatara (鑪) is a traditional Japanese method of processing iron into steel, which was typically use for making Japanese swords. The process and name first appear in the ancient Kojiki and Nihon Shoki texts from the Nara period. The process is believed to have originated in the Kingdom of Kibi around the middle of the sixth century, spread to various places in Japan. A low box-shaped furnace containing a clay tub is constructed and heated with charcoal until the correct temperature is reached. It is then filled with alternating layers of ironsand and charcoal over a 72-hour period, with the entire process taking up to a week. Once the iron has converted to steel, the clay vessel is broken and the steel bloom removed. Typically ten tons of iron sand yield 2.5 tones of tamahagane, or raw steel. This smelting process thus differs considerbly from that of the modern mass production of steel, and also differs from contemporary Chinese and Korean methods. In the Kamakura period and Muromachi period, furnaces increased in size to produce more steel of higher quality, with underground tunnels to more evenly distribute heat and reduce humidity. In the Edo Period, foot-operated blowers blow a large amount of air into the furnace to increase the temperature were introduced. However, following the introduction of Western technologies after the Meiji restoration, the traditional furnaces were no longer economically viable, and soon disappeared.

The Shirasu ruins date from the late Edo Period, and are located on a plateau at an elevation of about 130 meters on the left bank of the Shirasu River, which flows at the northern foot of Mount Shirasu in northeastern Yamaguchi prefecture. Archaeological excavations from 1979 to 1981 confirmed the remains of an iron smelting furnace that used iron sand as a raw material to refine iron, as well as the remains of attached structures such as an office, a blacksmith's shop, and a hut for workers. The ruins cover an area of 150 meters from east-to-west and 70 meters from north-to-south, and match well with the description of the picture scroll "Sakiotsu Agawamurayama Sand Iron Washing Tori no Zu" from the Edo period. According to related old documents, around 1856, Misuzu Yashichi, a wealthy merchant in Nichihara, Shimane, ran this factory and supplied the steel to shipbuilders of Chōshū Domain.

The ruins are currently backfilled for preservation. The site is about 10 minutes by car from Utagō Station on the JR West San'in Main Line.

== See also ==
- List of Historic Sites of Japan (Yamaguchi)
