= Nagato-Ōi Station =

Railway station in Hagi, Yamaguchi Prefecture, Japan

Nagato-Ōi Station 長門大井駅
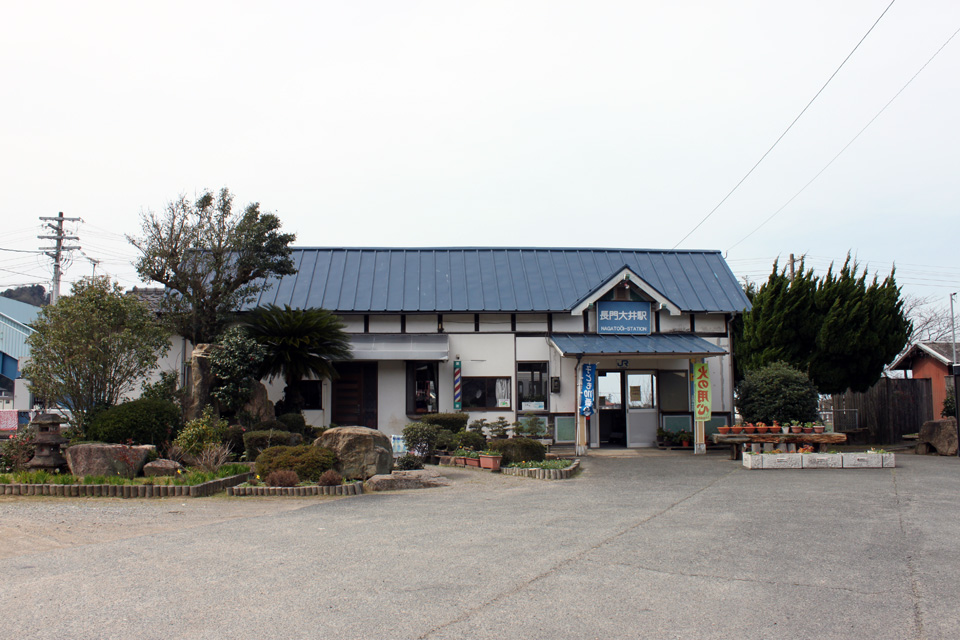
- Nagato-Ōi Station, March 2010

General information
- Location: 3349 Sammi Katada, Hagi-shi, Yamaguchi-ken 759-3611; Japan
- Coordinates: 34°28′15.88″N 131°26′59.3″E
- Owner: West Japan Railway Company
- Operator: West Japan Railway Company
- Line: San'in Main Line
- Distance: 564.5 km (350.8 miles) from Kyoto
- Platforms: 2 side platforms
- Tracks: 2

Other information
- Status: Unstaffed
- Website: Official website

History
- Opened: 24 April 1929; 97 years ago

Passengers
- FY2020: 15

Services
| Preceding station | JR West | Following station |
|---|---|---|
| Koshigahama towards Shimonoseki | San'in Main Line E Local | Nago towards Masuda |
Location
- Location within Yamaguchi Prefecture Location within Japan

Nagato-Ōi Station (長門大井駅, Nagato-Ōi-eki) is a passenger railway station located in the city of Hagi, Yamaguchi Prefecture, Japan. It is operated by the West Japan Railway Company (JR West).

== Lines ==
Nagato-Ōi Station is served by the JR West San'in Main Line, and is located 564.5 kilometers from the terminus of the line at Kyoto.

== Station layout ==
The station consists of two opposed unnumbered side platforms connected by a footbridge. The station is unattended.

== Platforms ==
| Station side | ■ San'in Main Line | for Higashi-Hagi and Nagatoshi |
| Opposite side | ■ San'in Main Line | for Masuda and Hamada |

== History ==
Nagato-Ōi Station was opened on 24 April 1929 when the Japan Government Railways Mine Line was extended betweenHigashi-Hagi Station and Nago Station. This portion of the Mine Line was incorporated into the San'in Main Line in 1933. Freight operations were discontinued from 1 February 1963. With the privatization of the Japan National Railway (JNR) on 1 April 1987, the station came under the aegis of the West Japan Railway Company (JR West).

== Passenger statistics ==
In fiscal 2020, the station was used by an average of 15 passengers daily.

== Surrounding area ==
- Hagi City Hall Oi Branch Office
- Hagi City Oi Junior High School
- Hagi City Oi Elementary School

== See also ==
- List of railway stations in Japan
