= Sammi Station =

Railway station in Hagi, Yamaguchi Prefecture, Japan

Sammi Station 三見駅
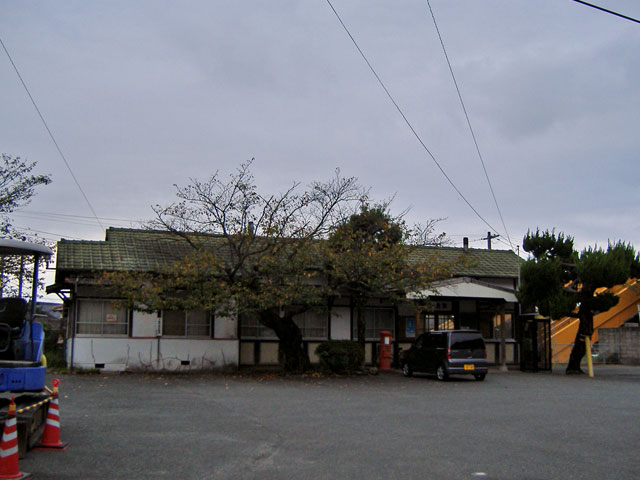
- Sammi Station in October 2007

General information
- Location: 3349 Sammi Katada, Hagi-shi, Yamaguchi-ken 759-3721; Japan
- Coordinates: 34°23′50.66″N 131°19′48.46″E
- Owner: West Japan Railway Company
- Operator: West Japan Railway Company
- Line: San'in Main Line
- Distance: 583.9 km (362.8 miles) from Kyoto
- Platforms: 2 side platforms
- Tracks: 2

Other information
- Status: Unstaffed
- Website: Official website

History
- Opened: 3 April 1925; 101 years ago

Passengers
- FY2020: 19

Services
Preceding station	JR West	Following station
Ii towards Shimonoseki	San'in Main Line E Local	Tamae towards Masuda
Location
- Location within Yamaguchi Prefecture Location within Japan

Sammi Station (三見駅, Sanmi-eki) is a passenger railway station located in the city of Hagi, Yamaguchi Prefecture, Japan. It is operated by the West Japan Railway Company (JR West).

== Lines ==
Sammi Station is served by the JR West San'in Main Line, and is located 583.9 kilometers from the terminus of the line at Kyoto.

== Station layout ==
The station consists of two opposed side platforms connected by a footbridge. The station is unattended.

== Platforms ==
Opposite side (1)	■ San'in Main Line	for Higashi-Hagi and Masuda
Station side (2)	■ San'in Main Line	for Nagatoshi and Shimonoseki

== History ==
The station was opened on 3 April 1925 when the Japan Government Railways Mine Line was extended between Nagati-Misumi Station and Hagi Station. This portion of the Mine Line was incorporated into the San'in Main Line in 1933. Freight operations were discontinued from 1 February 1963. With the privatization of the Japan National Railway (JNR) on 1 April 1987, the station came under the aegis of the West Japan Railway Company (JR West).

== Passenger statistics ==
In fiscal 2020, the station was used by an average of 19 passengers daily.

== Surrounding area ==
- Hagi City Hall Sanmi Branch Office
- Sanmi Fishing Port
- Hagi Municipal Sanmi Junior High School
- Hagi Municipal Sanmi Elementary School

== See also ==
- List of railway stations in Japan
