= Kiyo Station =

Railway station in Abu, Yamaguchi Prefecture, Japan

Kiyo Station 木与駅
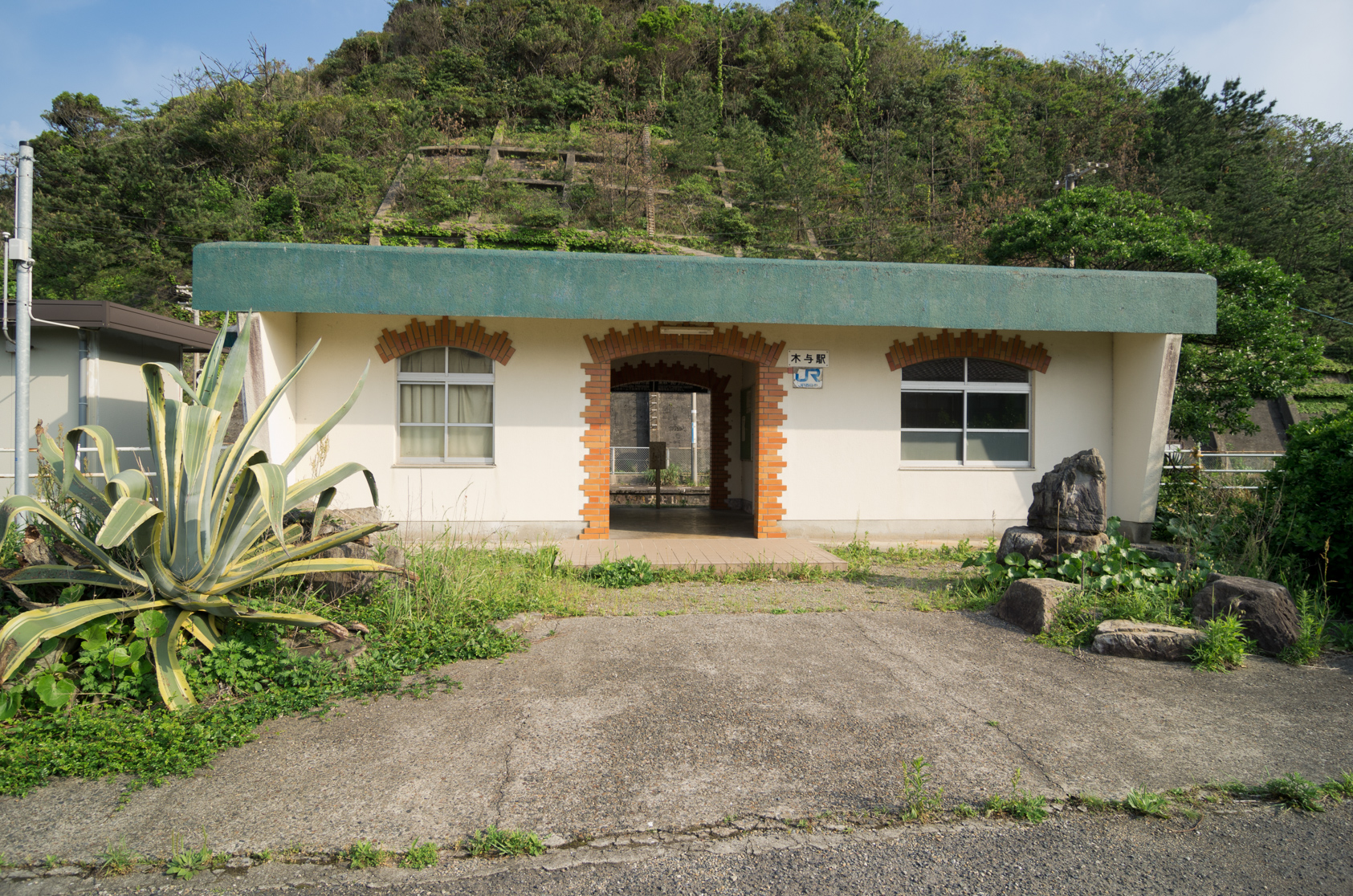
- Kiyo Station in May 2012

General information
- Location: 66 Kiyo Kamadokoro, Abu-gun, Abu-cho, Yamaguchi-ken 759-3621; Japan
- Coordinates: 34°31′58.39″N 131°30′12.28″E
- Owner: West Japan Railway Company
- Operator: West Japan Railway Company
- Line: San'in Main Line
- Distance: 555.2 km (345.0 miles) from Kyoto
- Platforms: 2 side platforms
- Tracks: 2
- Connections: Bus stop

Other information
- Status: Unstaffed
- Website: Official website

History
- Opened: 15 November 1931; 94 years ago

Passengers
- FY2020: 1

Services
Preceding station	JR West	Following station
Nago towards Shimonoseki	San'in Main Line E Local	Utagō towards Masuda
Location
- Location within Yamaguchi Prefecture Location within Japan

Kiyo Station (木与駅, Kiyo-eki) is a passenger railway station located in the town of Abu, Abu District, Yamaguchi Prefecture, Japan. It is operated by the West Japan Railway Company (JR West).

== Lines ==
Kiyo Station is served by the JR West San'in Main Line, and is located 555.6 kilometers from the terminus of the line at Kyoto. Only local trains stop at this station.

== Station layout ==
The station consists of two ground-level opposed unnumbered side platforms connected to the station building by an underground passage. The station is unattended.

== Platforms ==
station side	■ San'in Main Line	for Masuda and Hamada
opposite side	■ San'in Main Line	for Higashi-Hagi and Nagatoshi

== History ==
Kiyo Station was opened as an intermediate station of the Japan Government Railways Mine Line when the line was extended to Utagō Station on 15 November 1931. This portion of the Mine Line was incorporated into the San'in Main Line on 24 February 1933. Freight operations were discontinued on 1 February 1963. With the privatization of the Japan National Railway (JNR) on 1 April 1987, the station came under the aegis of the West Japan railway Company (JR West). The station was out of operation from 28 July 2013 to 10 August 2014 due to damage to the line caused by torrential rains.

== Passenger statistics ==
In fiscal 2020, the station was used by an average of 1 passengers daily.

== Surrounding area ==
- Kiyogahama Beach
- Japan National Route 191

== See also ==
- List of railway stations in Japan
