= Yamaguchi University of Human Welfare and Culture =

Coordinates: 34.430983°N 131.421804°E

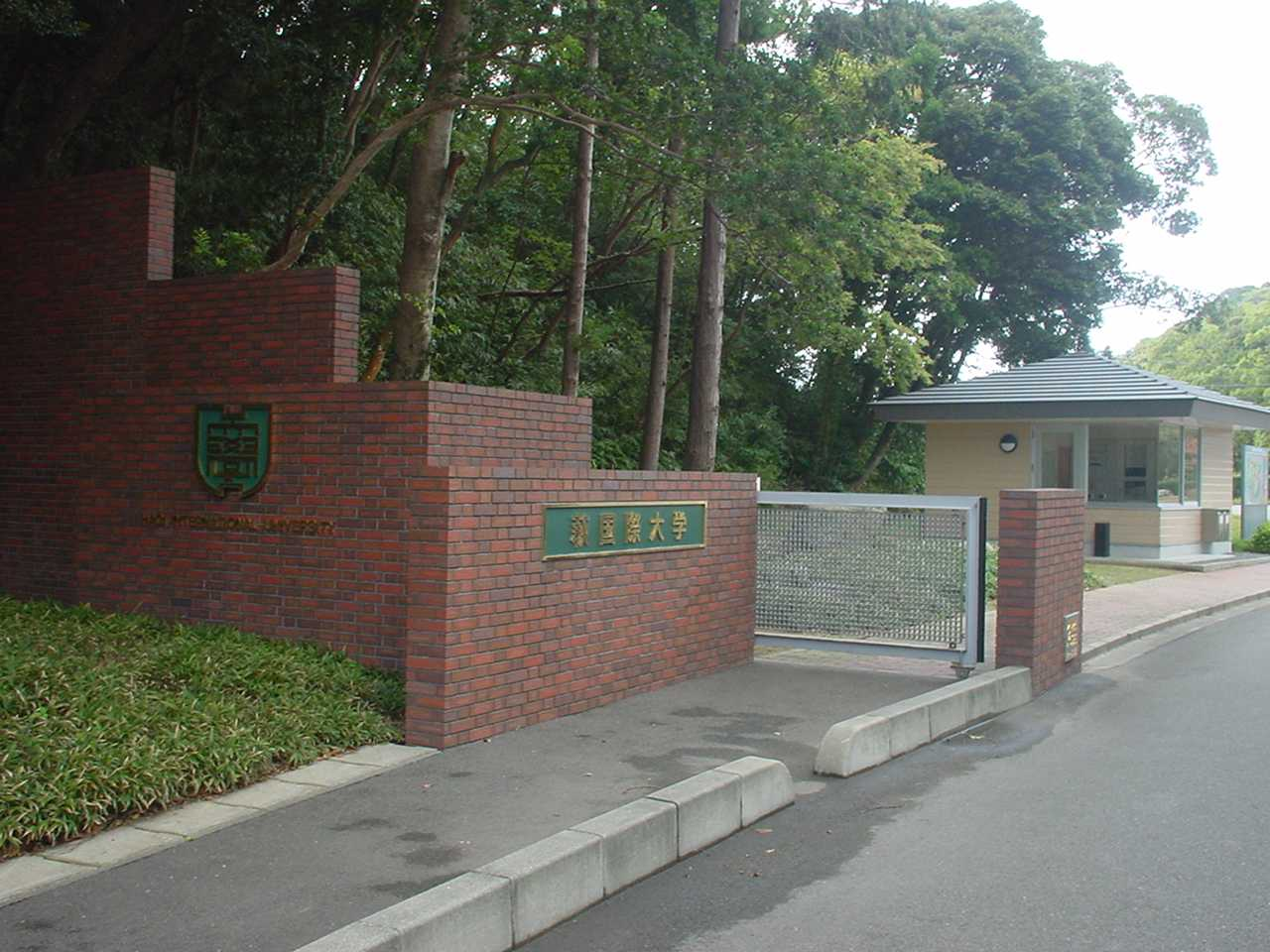
Yamaguchi University of Human Welfare and Culture

Yamaguchi University of Human Welfare and Culture (山口福祉文化大学, Yamaguchi fukushi bunka daigaku) is a private university in Hagi, Yamaguchi, Japan. The school was first established as a junior women's college in 1967. It became a co-ed four-year college in 1999.
