= Ii Station =

Railway station in Hagi, Yamaguchi Prefecture, Japan

Ii Station 飯井駅
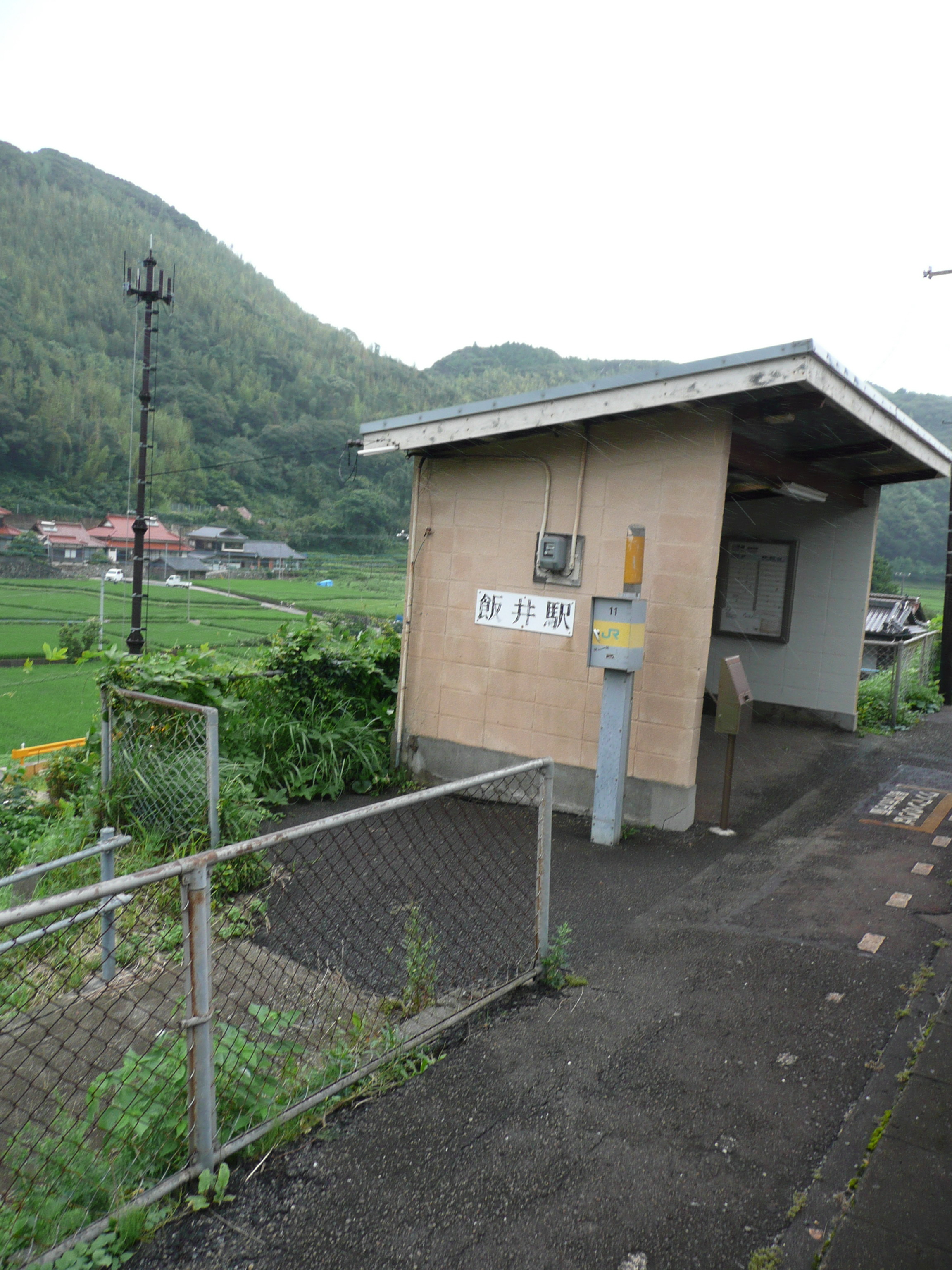
- Waiting Room of Ii Station (2009)

General information
- Location: 4876 Sammi Maemizunashi, Sanmi, Hagi-shi, Yamaguchi-ken 759-3721; Japan
- Coordinates: 34°22′44.87″N 131°17′42.05″E
- Owner: West Japan Railway Company
- Operator: West Japan Railway Company
- Line: San'in Main Line
- Distance: 588.1 km (365.4 miles) from Kyoto
- Platforms: 1 side platform
- Tracks: 1

Other information
- Status: Unstaffed
- Website: Official website

History
- Opened: 21 January 1964; 62 years ago

Passengers
- FY2020: 4

Services
Preceding station	JR West	Following station
Nagato-Misumi towards Shimonoseki	San'in Main Line E Local	Sammi towards Masuda
Location
- Location within Yamaguchi Prefecture Location within Japan

Ii Station (飯井駅, Ii-eki) is a passenger railway station located in the city of Hagi, Yamaguchi Prefecture, Japan. It is operated by the West Japan Railway Company (JR West). The station is promoted by a local government as "the station with the shortest Latin name", based on the fact that, while there are other stations with two Latin letters (Ao, Oe, and Ei), the width of "Ii" is the narrowest amongst others.

== Lines ==
Ii Station is served by the JR West San'in Main Line, and is located 588.1 kilometers from the terminus of the line at Kyoto.

== Station layout ==
The station consists of one side platform serving a single bi-directional track. The station building is on the platform and serves as a waiting room. The station is unattended.

== History ==
The station was opened on 21 January 1964 as an unstaffed station on the initiative of Takeo Kawamura's father, a prefectural assemblyman from the area. From 28 July to 8 August 2013, due to heavy rain damaging the track, train service was suspended from Masuda Station to Nagatoshi Station, including this station. In 2020, 300 pieces of visit certificates is distributed to people who visited.

== Passenger statistics ==
In fiscal 2020, the station was used by an average of 4 passengers daily.

== Surrounding area ==
The station is located in the fishing port village of Ii, surrounded by mountains and the sea, and from the platform the Sea of Japan is visible.

== See also ==
- List of railway stations in Japan
