= Koshigahama Station =

Railway station in Hagi, Yamaguchi Prefecture, Japan

Koshigahama Station 越ケ浜駅
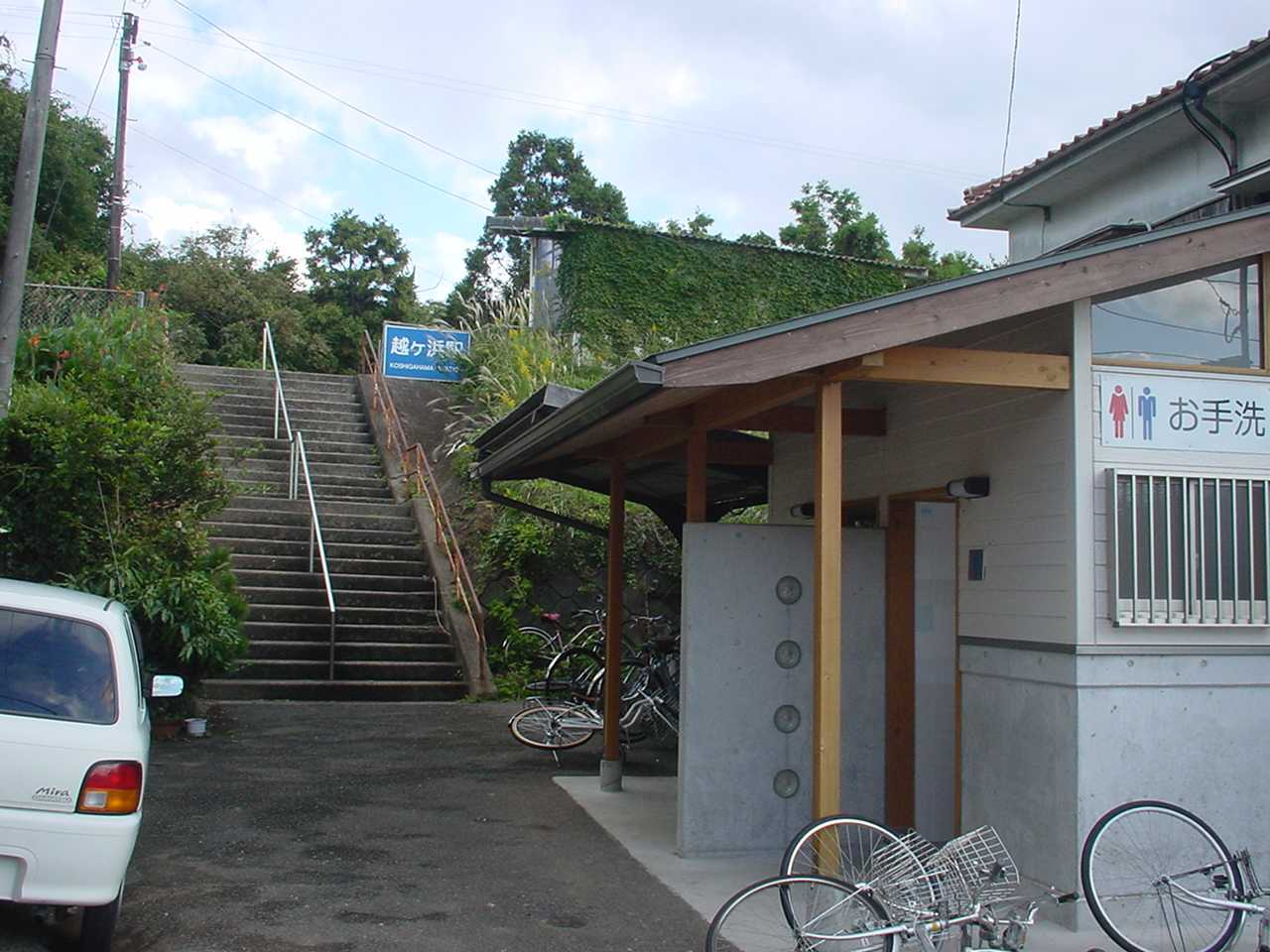
- Koshigahama Station in October 2005

General information
- Location: 659 Chintō Nagahata, Hagi-shi, Yamaguchi-ken 758-0011; Japan
- Coordinates: 34°26′20.35″N 131°25′21.1″E
- Owner: West Japan Railway Company
- Operator: West Japan Railway Company
- Line: San'in Main Line
- Distance: 569.1 km (353.6 miles) from Kyoto
- Platforms: 1 side platform
- Tracks: 1

Other information
- Status: Unstaffed
- Website: Official website

History
- Opened: 1 April 1960; 66 years ago

Passengers
- FY2020: 5

Services
Preceding station	JR West	Following station
Higashi-Hagi towards Shimonoseki	San'in Main Line E Local	Nagato-Ōi towards Masuda
Location
- Location within Yamaguchi Prefecture Location within Japan

Koshigahama Station (越ケ浜駅, Koshigahama-eki) is a passenger railway station located in the city of Hagi, Yamaguchi Prefecture, Japan. It is operated by the West Japan Railway Company (JR West).

== Lines ==
Koshigahama Station is served by the JR West San'in Main Line, and is located 569.1 kilometers from the terminus of the line at Kyoto.

== Station layout ==
The station consists of one side platform serving a single bi-directional track on an embankment. There is no station building, and the station is unattended.

== History ==
Koshigahama Station was opened on 1 April 1960. With the privatization of the Japan National Railway (JNR) on 1 April 1987, the station came under the aegis of the West Japan Railway Company (JR West).

== Passenger statistics ==
In fiscal 2020, the station was used by an average of 5 passengers daily.

== Surrounding area ==
- Hagi Municipal Koshigahama Junior High School
- Hagi Municipal Koshigahama Elementary School

== See also ==
- List of railway stations in Japan
