= Tamae Station =

Railway station in Hagi, Yamaguchi Prefecture, Japan

Tamae Station 玉江駅
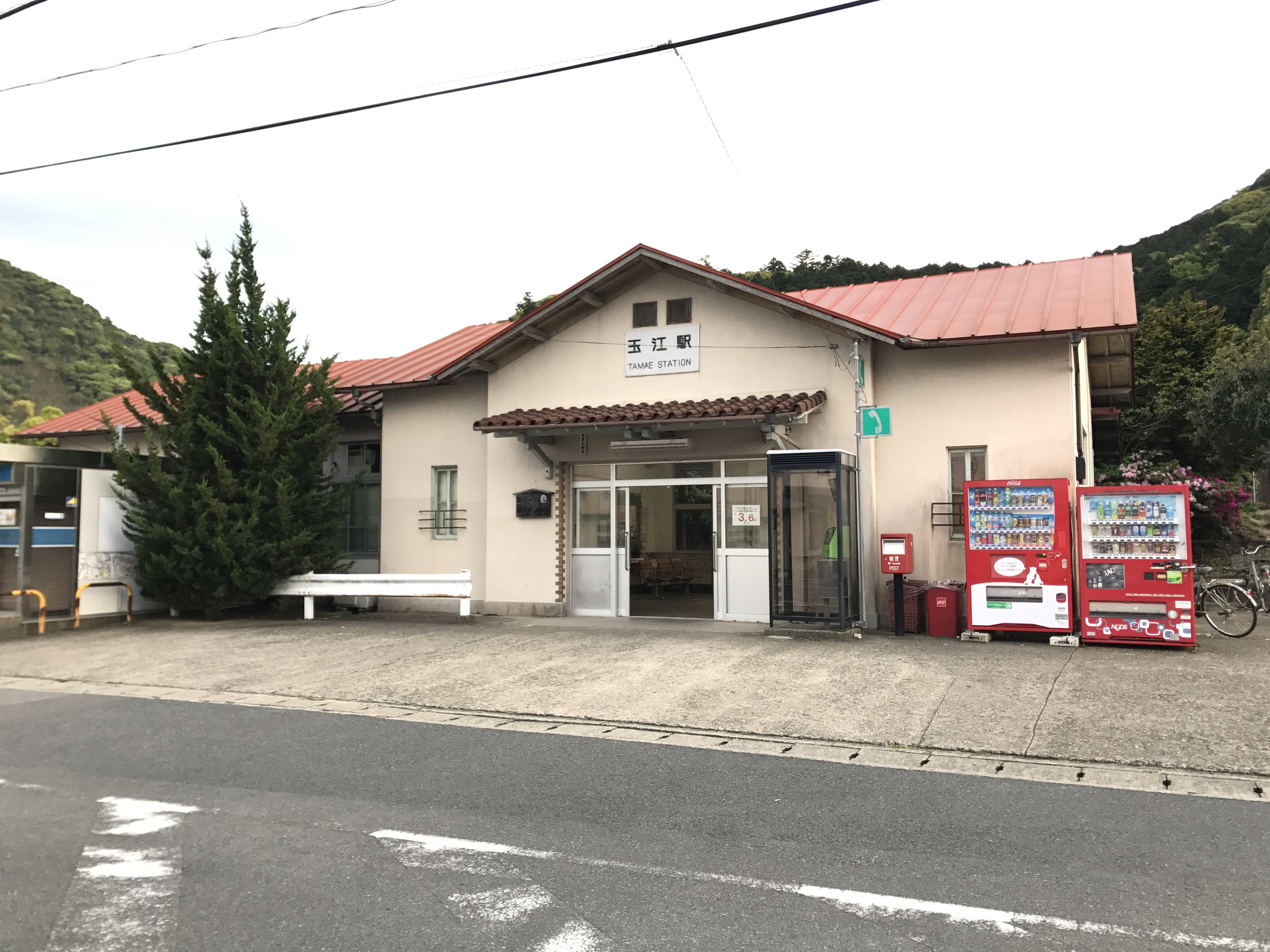
- Tamae Station in May 2017

General information
- Location: 4757 Yamada Nishiokita, Hagi-shi, Yamaguchi-ken 758-0063; Japan
- Coordinates: 34°24′19.26″N 131°22′48.21″E
- Owner: West Japan Railway Company
- Operator: West Japan Railway Company
- Line: San'in Main Line
- Distance: 578.2 km (359.3 miles) from Kyoto
- Platforms: 1 side platform
- Tracks: 1

Other information
- Status: Unstaffed
- Website: Official website

History
- Opened: 3 April 1925; 101 years ago

Passengers
- FY2020: 156

Services
Preceding station	JR West	Following station
Sammi towards Shimonoseki	San'in Main Line E Local	Hagi towards Masuda
Location
- Location within Yamaguchi Prefecture Location within Japan

Tamae Station (玉江駅, Tamae-eki) is a passenger railway station located in the city of Hagi, Yamaguchi Prefecture, Japan. It is operated by the West Japan Railway Company (JR West).

== Lines ==
Tamae Station is served by the JR West San'in Main Line, and is located 578.2 kilometers from the terminus of the line at Kyoto.

== Station layout ==
The station consists of one side platform serving a single bi-directional track. The station is unattended.

== History ==
The station was opened on 3 April 1925 when the Japan Government Railways Mine Line was extended between Nagati-Misumi Station and Hagi Station. This portion of the Mine Line was incorporated into the San'in Main Line in 1933. Freight operations were discontinued from 1 February 1963. With the privatization of the Japan National Railway (JNR) on 1 April 1987, the station came under the aegis of the West Japan Railway Company (JR West).

== Passenger statistics ==
In fiscal 2020, the station was used by an average of 156 passengers daily.

== Surrounding area ==
- Hagi Castle Ruins (nationally designated historic site)
- Hagi Castle Town (nationally designated historic site)
- Mt. Shigetsu (National Natural Monument)
- Former Asa Mori Family Hagi Yashiki Nagaya (Nationally Designated Important Cultural Property)
- National Important Preservation District for Groups of Traditional Buildings (Heian Old District/Horiuchi District)

== See also ==
- List of railway stations in Japan
