= Kawakami, Yamaguchi =

Dissolved municipality in Yamaguchi prefecture, Japan

Kawakami (川上村, Kawakami-son) was a village located in Abu District, Yamaguchi Prefecture, Japan.

As of 2003, the village had an estimated population of 1,141 and a density of 12.24 persons per km^{2}. The total area was 93.22 km^{2}.

On March 6, 2005, Kawakami was merged into the expanded city of Hagi along with the towns of Susa and Tamagawa, and the villages of Asahi, Fukue and Mutsumi (all from Abu District).
