= Atō, Yamaguchi =

Dissolved municipality in Yamaguchi prefecture, Japan

Coordinates: 34°24′N 131°43′E

Atō (阿東町, Atō-chō) was a town located in Abu District, Yamaguchi Prefecture, Japan.

As of 2003, the town had an estimated population of 8,006 and a density of 27.32 persons per km^{2}. The total area was 293.08 km^{2}.

On January 16, 2010, Atō was merged into the expanded city of Yamaguchi.
