= Fukue, Yamaguchi =

Dissolved municipality in Yamaguchi prefecture, Japan

Fukue (福栄村, Fukue-son) was a village located in Abu District, Yamaguchi Prefecture, Japan.

As of 2003, the village had an estimated population of 2,487 and a density of 25.30 persons per km^{2}. The total area was 98.30 km^{2}.

On March 6, 2005, Fukue was merged into the expanded city of Hagi along with the towns of Susa and Tamagawa, and the villages of Asahi, Kawakami and Mutsumi (all from Abu District).
