= Asahi, Yamaguchi =

Dissolved municipality in Yamaguchi prefecture, Japan

Asahi (旭村, Asahi-son) was a village located in Abu District, Yamaguchi Prefecture, Japan.

As of 2003, the village had an estimated population of 2,091 and a density of 15.60 persons per km^{2}. The total area was 134.04 km^{2}.

On March 6, 2005, Asahi was merged into the expanded city of Hagi along with the towns of Susa and Tamagawa, and the villages of Fukue, Kawakami and Mutsumi (all from Abu District).
