= Mutsumi, Yamaguchi =

Dissolved municipality in Yamaguchi prefecture, Japan

Mutsumi (むつみ村, Mutsumi-son) was a village located in Abu District, Yamaguchi Prefecture, Japan.

On March 6, 2005, Mutsumi was merged into the expanded city of Hagi along with the towns of Susa and Tamagawa, and the villages of Asahi, Fukue and Kawakami (all from Abu District).
