= Susa, Yamaguchi =

Dissolved municipality in Yamaguchi prefecture, Japan

Susa (須佐町, Susa-chō) was a town located in Abu District, Yamaguchi Prefecture, Japan.

As of 2003, the town had an estimated population of 3,605 and a density of 41.37 persons per km^{2}. The total area was 87.15 km^{2}.

On March 6, 2005, Susa was merged into the expanded city of Hagi along with the town of Tamagawa, and the villages of Asahi, Fukue, Kawakami and Mutsumi (all from Abu District).
