= Tamagawa, Yamaguchi =

Dissolved municipality in Yamaguchi prefecture, Japan

Tamagawa (田万川町, Tamagawa-chō) was a town located in Abu District, Yamaguchi Prefecture, Japan.

As of 2003, the town had an estimated population of 3,528 and a density of 45.11 persons per km^{2}. The total area was 78.21 km^{2}.

On March 6, 2005, Tamagawa was merged into the expanded city of Hagi along with the town of Susa, and the villages of Asahi, Fukue, Kawakami and Mutsumi (all from Abu District).
