= Hagi Station =

Railway station in Hagi, Yamaguchi Prefecture, Japan

Hagi Station 萩駅
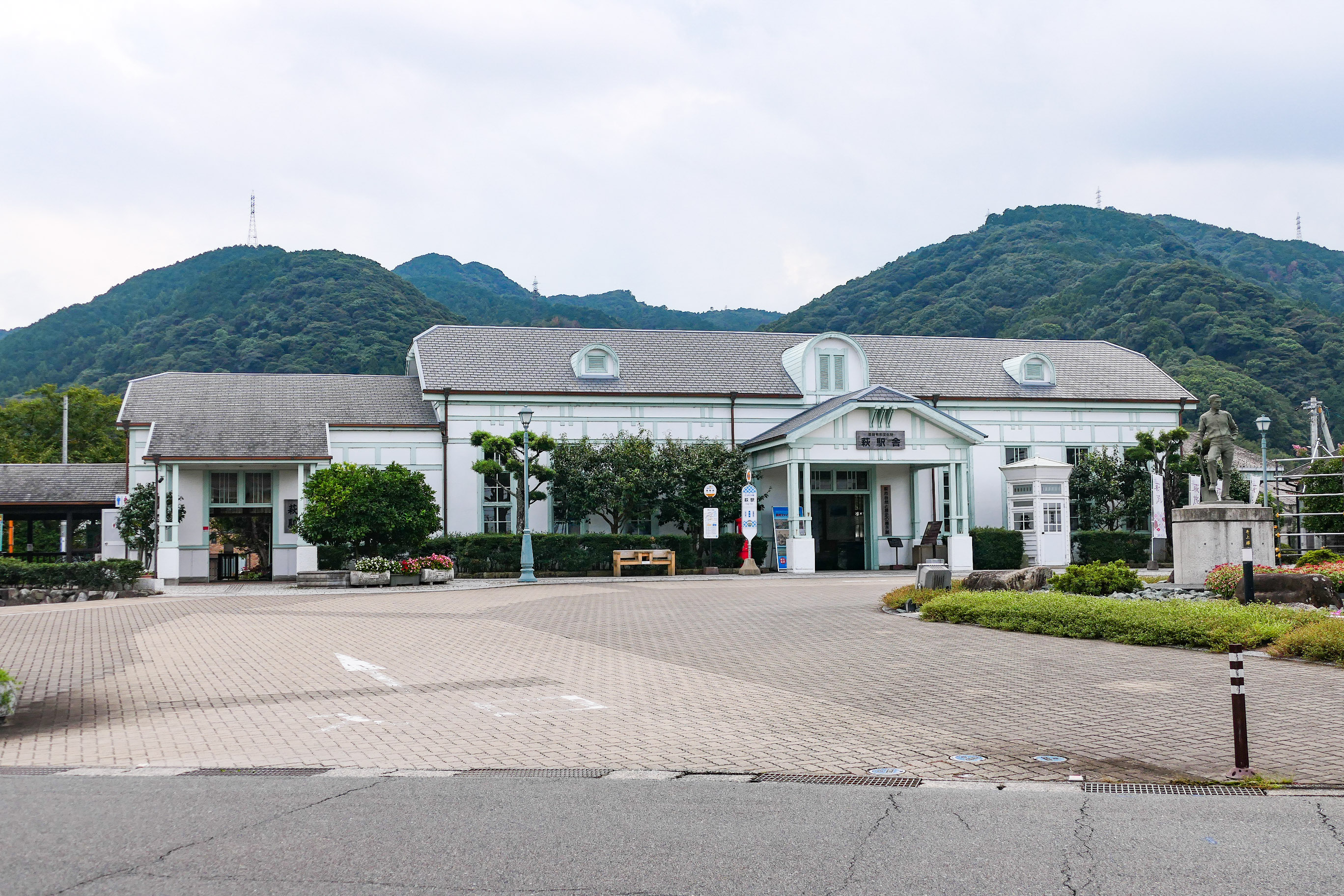
- Hagi Station in 2025

General information
- Location: 3611 Tsubaki Nigoribuchi, Hagi-shi, Yamaguchi-ken 758-0061; Japan
- Coordinates: 34°23′37.98″N 131°24′3.93″E
- Owner: West Japan Railway Company
- Operator: West Japan Railway Company
- Line: San'in Main Line
- Distance: 575.8 km (357.8 miles) from Kyoto
- Platforms: 2 side platforms
- Tracks: 2

Other information
- Status: Unstaffed
- Website: Official website

History
- Opened: 3 April 1925; 101 years ago

Passengers
- FY2020: 37

Services
Preceding station	JR West	Following station
Tamae towards Shimonoseki	San'in Main Line E Local	Higashi-Hagi towards Masuda
Location
- Location within Yamaguchi Prefecture Location within Japan

Hagi Station (萩駅, Hagi-eki) is a passenger railway station located in the city of Hagi, Yamaguchi Prefecture, Japan. It is operated by the West Japan Railway Company (JR West).

== Lines ==
Hagi Station is served by the JR West San'in Main Line, and is located 575.8 kilometers from the terminus of the line at Kyoto.

== Station layout ==
The station consists of two opposed side platforms connected by a footbridge. The station is unattended. At present, the west half of the station building is the Hagi City Nature and History Museum.

== Platforms ==
Station side	■ San'in Main Line	for Higashi-Hagi and Masuda
Opposite side	■ San'in Main Line	for Nagatoshi and Shimonoseki

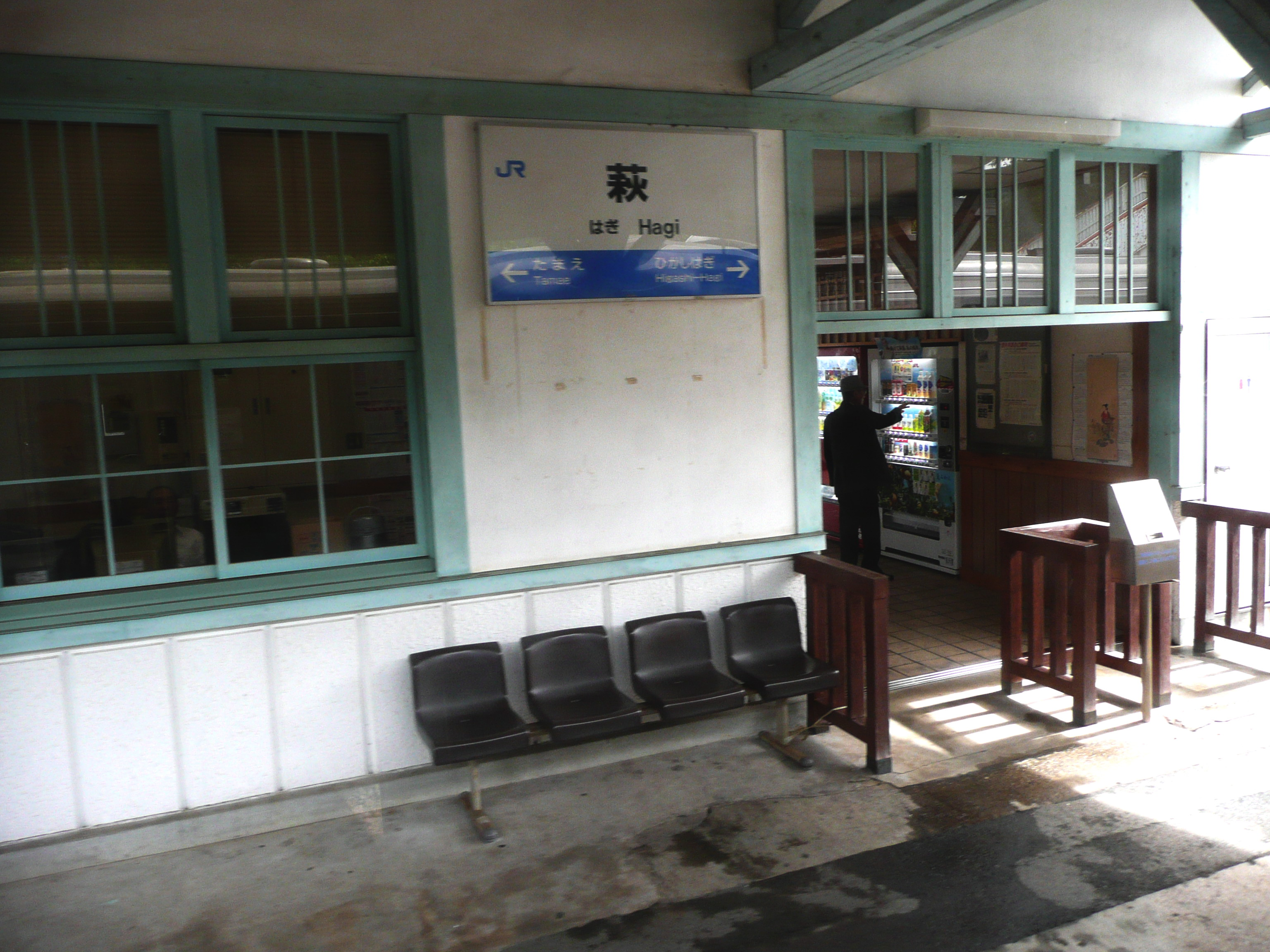
Wicket gate

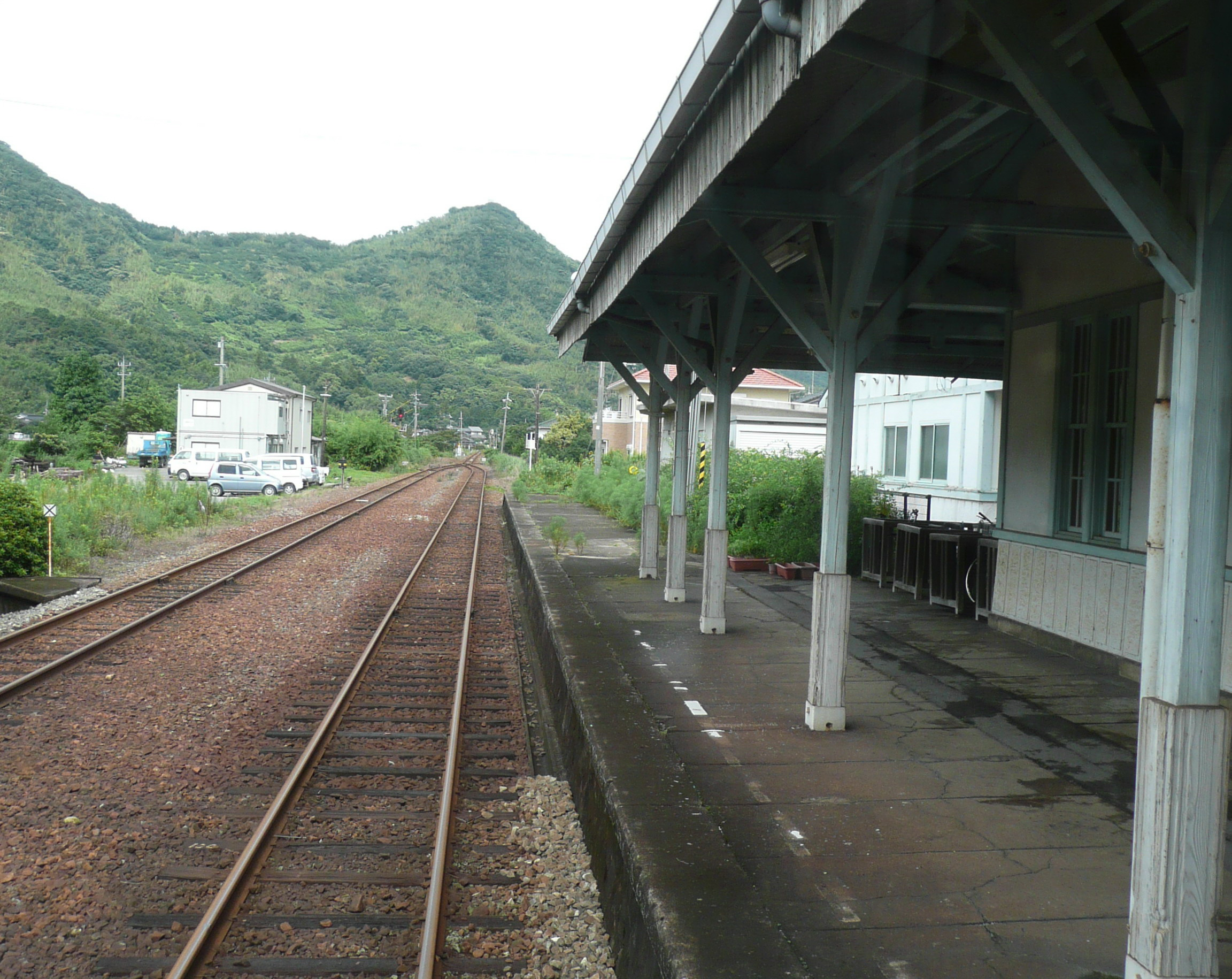
Platform(looking towards Shimonoseki)

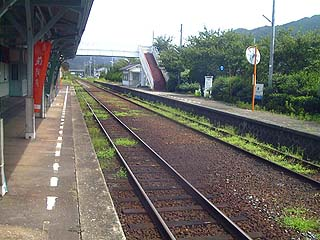
Platform (tooking towards Masuda) (東萩・益田方面)

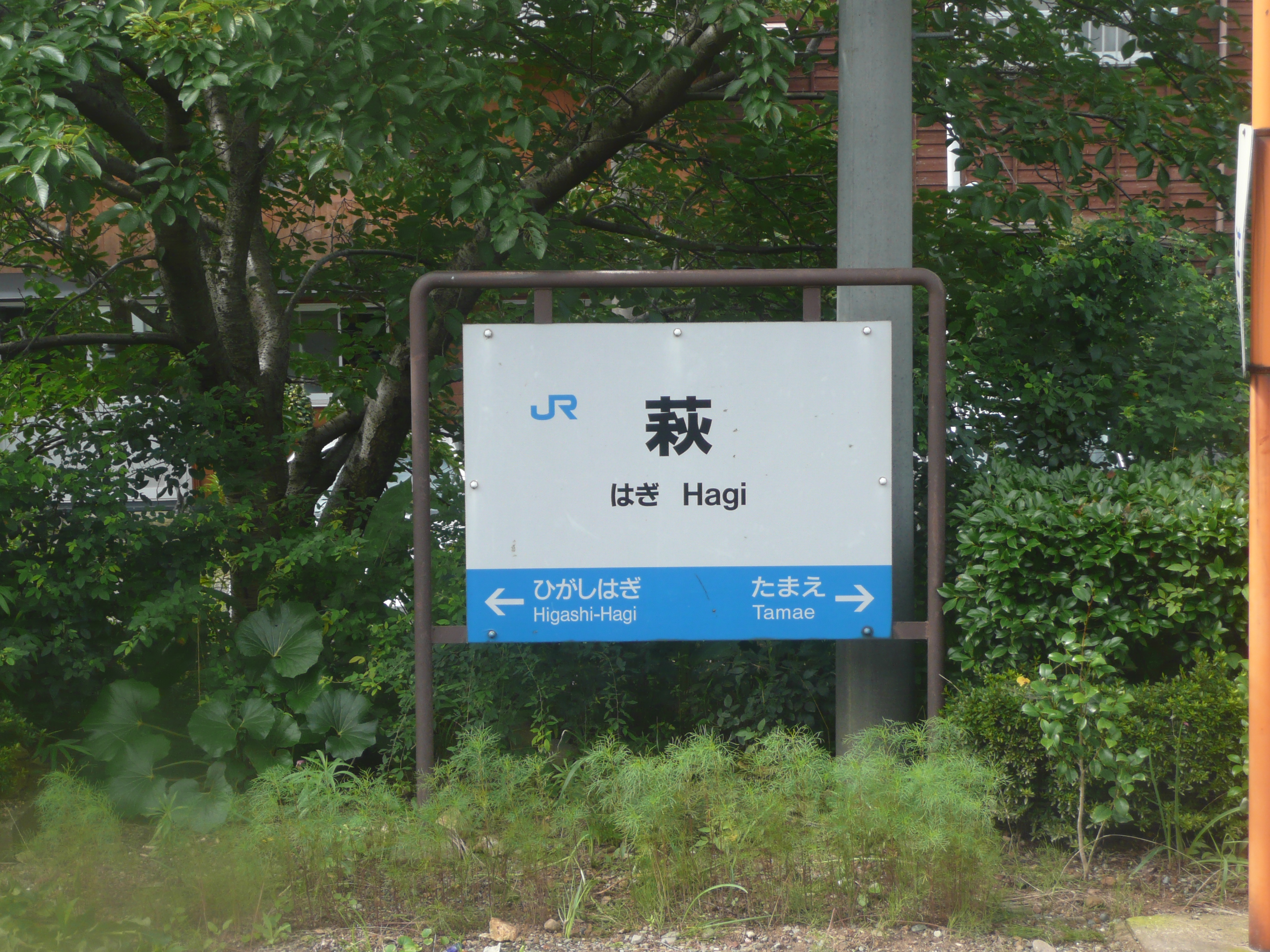
Station sign

== History ==
The station was opened on 3 April 1925 when the Japan Government Railways Mine Line was extended between Nagato-Misumi Station and Hagi Station. This portion of the Mine Line was incorporated into the San'in Main Line in 1933. Freight operations were discontinued from 31 March 1977. With the privatization of the Japan National Railway (JNR) on 1 April 1987, the station came under the aegis of the West Japan Railway Company (JR West). The station building received protection by the national government as a Registered Tangible Cultural Properties in 1996.

== Passenger statistics ==
In fiscal 2020, the station was used by an average of 37 passengers daily.

== Surrounding area ==
- Daishō-in (cemetery of the Mōri clan, the daimyō of Chōshū Domain)
- Hagi Municipal Hagi Civic Gymnasium
- Hagi Municipal Chunnishi Elementary School
- Hagi City Hospital

== See also ==
- List of railway stations in Japan
