= Abu, Yamaguchi =

Abu 阿武町
- Town
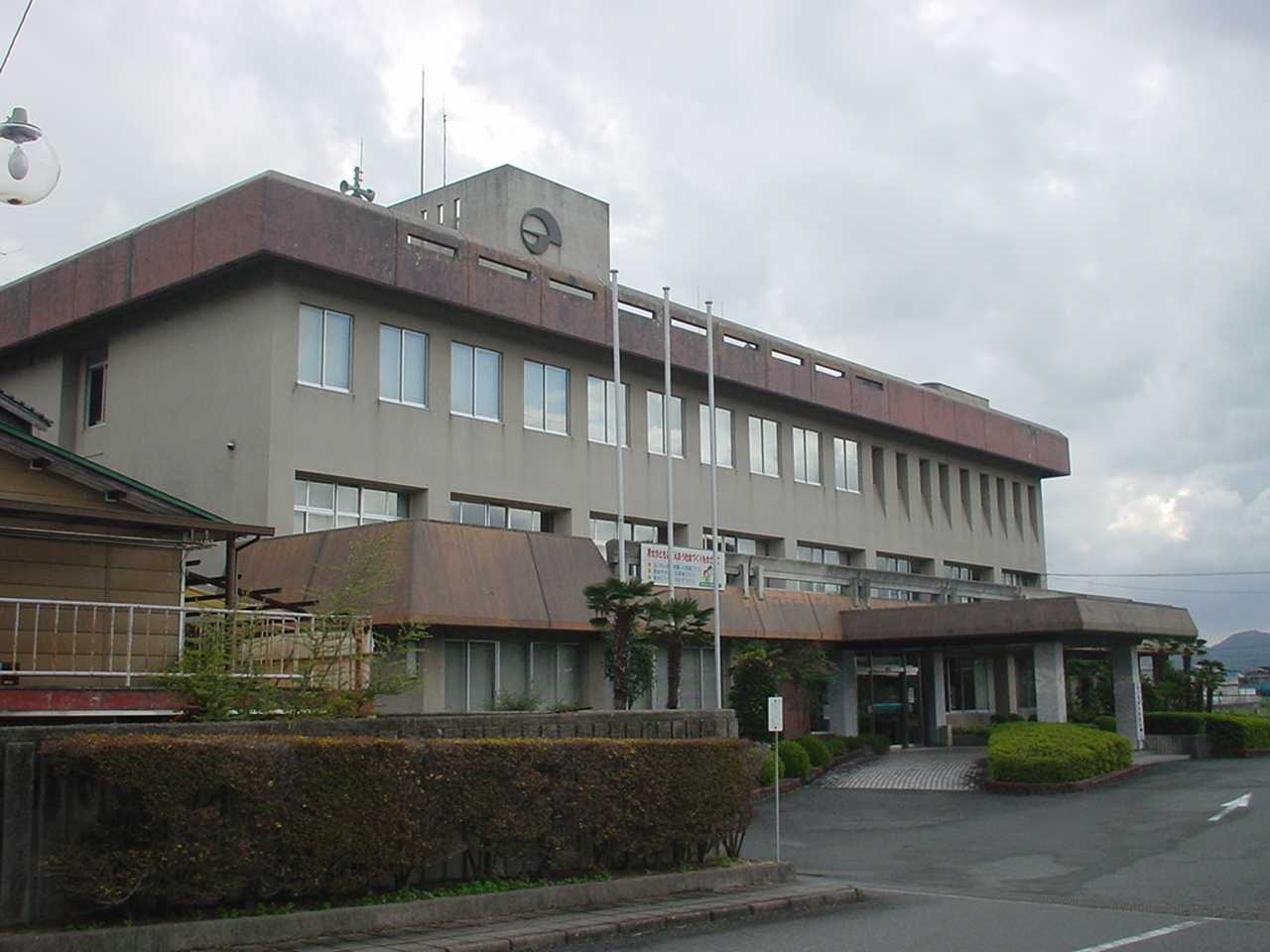
- Abu Town Office

- Flag Emblem
- Interactive map of Abu
- Location in Japan
- Coordinates: 34°30′12″N 131°28′17″E
- Country: Japan
- Region: Chūgoku; San'yō
- Prefecture: Yamaguchi
- District: Abu

Government
  - Mayor: Norihiko Hanada (from May 2017)

Area
  - Total: 115.95 km^{2} (44.77 sq mi)

Population (June 30, 2023)
  - Total: 3,054
  - Density: 26.34/km^{2} (68.22/sq mi)
- Time zone: UTC+09:00 (JST)
- City hall address: 2636, Nako, Abu-cho, Abu-gun, Yamaguchi-ken 759-3622
- Website: Official website
- Symbols
- Flower: Rhododendron
- Tree: Kusunoki

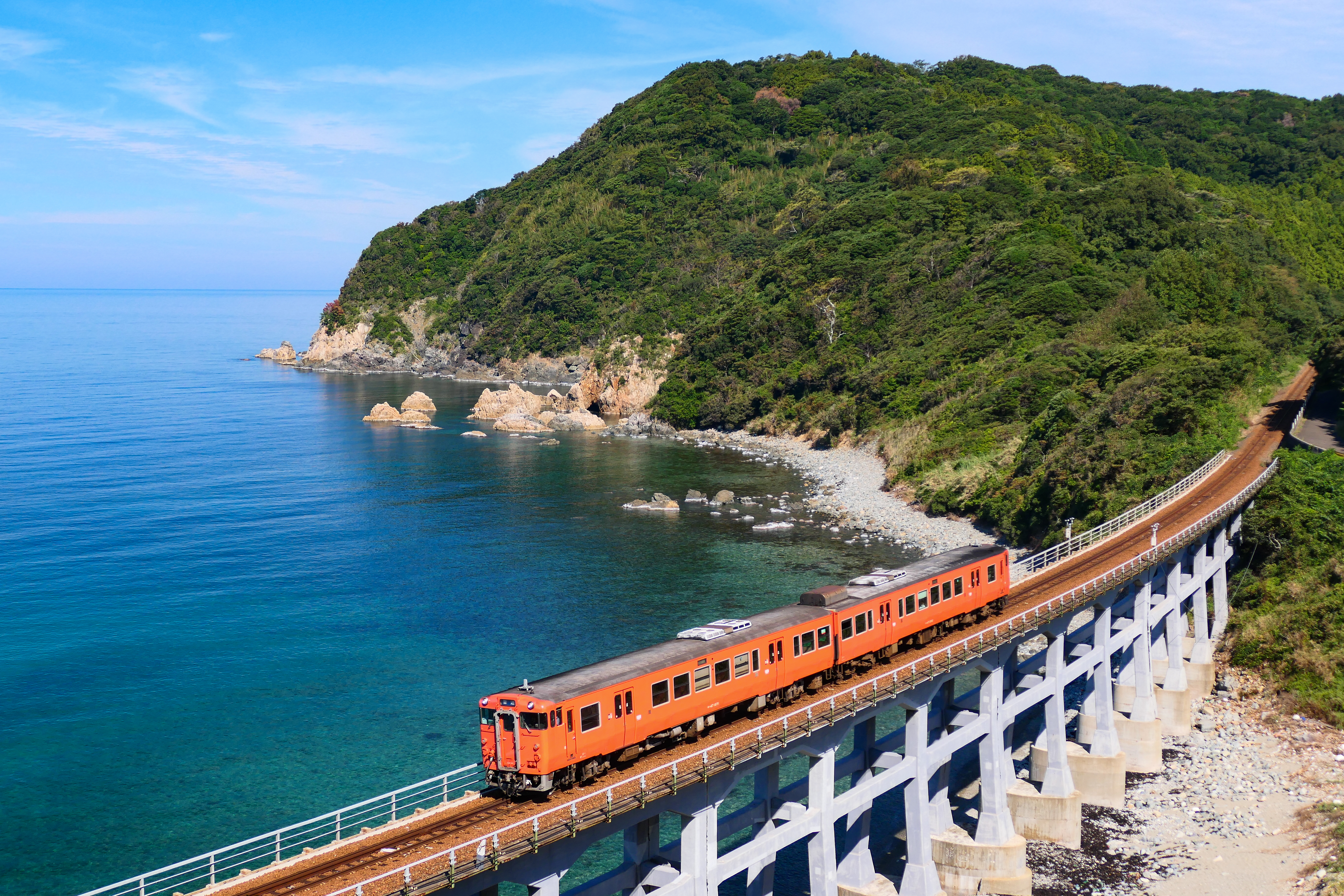
San'in Main Line Sogo River Bridge

Abu (阿武町, Abu-chō) is a town located in Abu District, Yamaguchi Prefecture, Japan. As of 30 June 2023, the town had an estimated population of 3,054 in 1530 households and a population density of 26 persons per km^{2}. The total area of the town is 115.95 square kilometres (44.77 sq mi). Noted for its wagyu beef and kiwifruit, the town is a member of The Most Beautiful Villages in Japan association.

== Geography ==
Abu is located in northeastern of Yamaguchi prefecture and borders the Sea of Japan on the north. It consists of the Nago area facing the sea, the Udago area, and the Fukuga area in the mountains. Much of the town is within the borders of the Kita-Nagato Kaigan Quasi-National Park.

=== Neighbouring municipalities ===
- Hagi

=== Climate ===
Abu has a humid subtropical climate (Köppen climate classification Cfa) with very warm summers and cool winters. The average annual temperature in Abu is 14.8 °C. The average annual rainfall is 1746 mm with September as the wettest month. The temperatures are highest on average in July, at around 25.9 °C, and lowest in January, at around 4.3 °C.

== Demographics ==
Per Japanese census data, the population of Abu has been declining for the past 50 years.

Historical population
Year	Pop.	±%
1940	8,580	—
1950	10,837	+26.3%
1960	10,010	−7.6%
1970	7,409	−26.0%
1980	6,272	−15.3%
1990	5,457	−13.0%
2000	4,555	−16.5%
2010	3,734	−18.0%
Waki population statistics

== History ==
The area of Abu was part of an ancient Nagato Province. During the Edo Period, the area was part of the holdings of Iwakuni Domain. Following the Meiji restoration, the area was organized into villages of Nago, Fukaga, and Utago within Abu District, Yamaguchi with the creation of the modern municipalities system on April 1, 1889. Nago as elevated to town status on November 3, 1942. On January 1, 1955, Nago merged with Fukaga and Utago to form the town of Abu.

=== COVID-19 Relief Funds Incident ===
On April 8, 2022, a municipal official mistakenly transferred Abu's entire COVID-19 relief budget of 46.3 million yen (c. US$358,000) to Abu resident Sho Taguchi. After promising to return the payment, Taguchi spent the money in online casinos. The incident drew attention from Japan's national news media. On May 18, Taguchi was arrested and indicted for computer fraud for transferring 42.92 million yen of the 46.3 million yen to three online payment agents, knowing that the payment had been made in error. On May 24, the mayor of Abu, Norihiko Hanada, announced that almost 43 million yen of the money had been recovered. On August 1, Taguchi was released on bail after paying 2.5 million yen, and commented that he is going to work and gradually pay the money back.

== Government ==
Abu has a mayor-council form of government with a directly elected mayor and a unicameral town council of eight members. Waki, together with the city of Hagi contributes two members to the Yamaguchi Prefectural Assembly. In terms of national politics, the town is part of the Yamaguchi 3rd district of the lower house of the Diet of Japan.

== Economy ==
The economy of Abu is based on agriculture and commercial fishing, with some forestry in inland mountain areas.

== Education ==
Abu has two public elementary schools and two public junior high schools operated by the town government, and one public high school operated by the Yamaguchi Prefectural Board of Education.

== Transportation ==
=== Railway ===
JR West (JR West) - San'in Main Line

- Utagō - Kiyo - Nago

=== Highways ===
- National Route 191
- National Route 315
