= Utagō Station =

Railway station in Abu, Yamaguchi Prefecture, Japan

Utagō Station 宇田郷駅
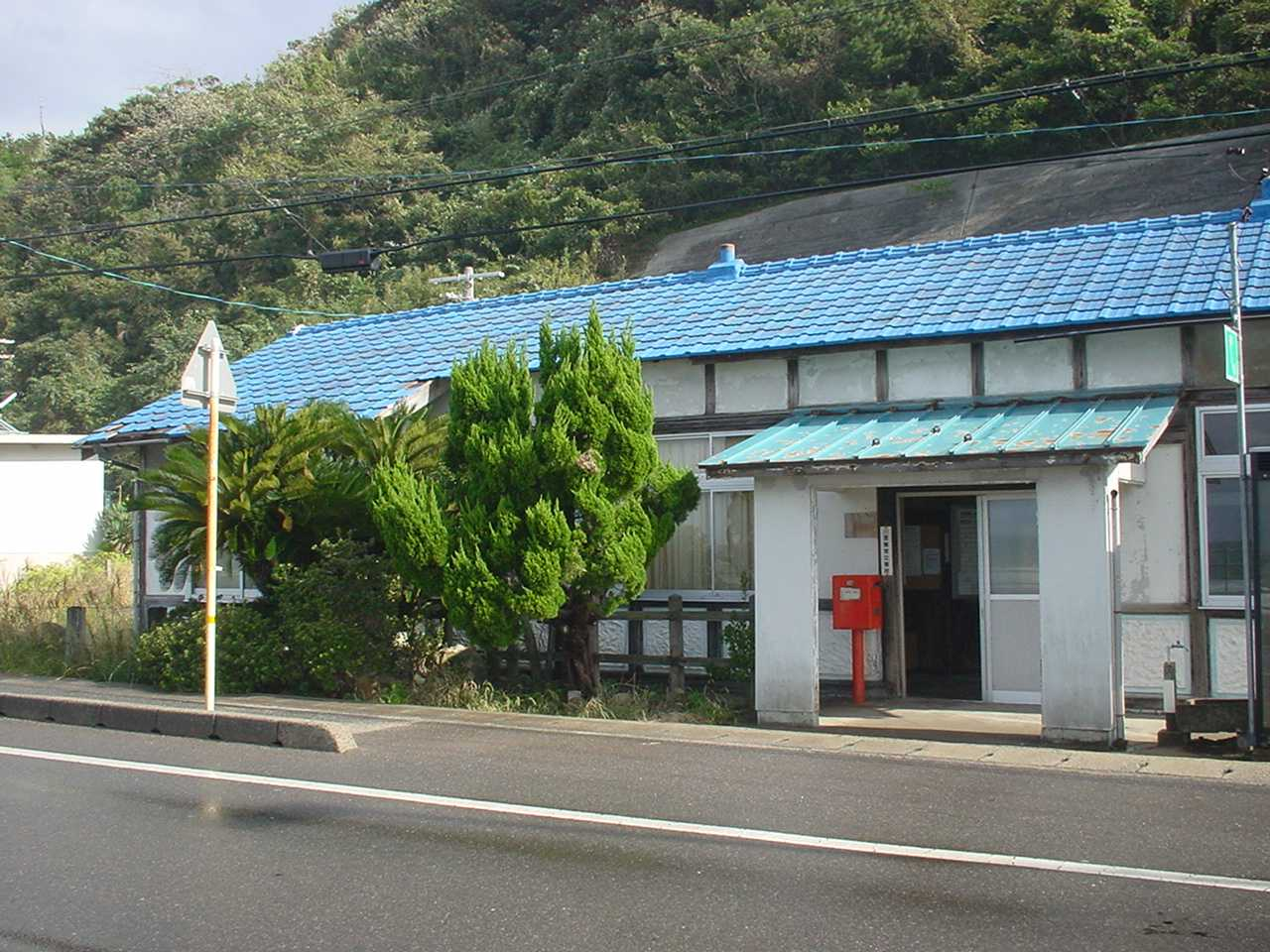
- Utagō Station in October 2005

General information
- Location: 2142 Uta Nagahama, Abu-gun, Abu-cho, Yamaguchi-ken 759-3501; Japan
- Coordinates: 34°34′18.86″N 131°32′55.85″E
- Owner: West Japan Railway Company
- Operator: West Japan Railway Company
- Line: San'in Main Line
- Distance: 549.2 km (341.3 miles) from Kyoto
- Platforms: 1 side platform
- Tracks: 2
- Connections: Bus stop

Other information
- Status: Unstaffed
- Website: Official website

History
- Opened: 15 November 1931; 94 years ago

Passengers
- FY2020: 8

Services
Preceding station	JR West	Following station
Kiyo towards Shimonoseki	San'in Main Line E Local	Susa towards Masuda
Location
- Location within Yamaguchi Prefecture Location within Japan

Utagō Station (宇田郷駅, Utagō-eki) is a passenger railway station located in the town of Abu, Abu District, Yamaguchi Prefecture, Japan. It is operated by the West Japan Railway Company (JR West).

== Lines ==
Utagō Station is served by the JR West San'in Main Line, and is located 549.2 kilometers from the terminus of the line at Kyoto. Only local trains stop at this station.

== Station layout ==
The station consists of two ground-level opposed side platforms; however the footbridge connecting the platform has been removed, and only one of the side platforms is now in use, serving bi-directional traffic. The station building was also dismantled, and a waiting room was installed on each platform.

== History ==
Utagō Station was opened as a terminus of the Japan Government Railways Mine Line when the line was extended on 15 November 1931. It was further extended fo Susa Station and this portion of the Mine Line was incorporated into the San'in Main Line on 24 February 1933. Freight operations were discontinued on 1 February 1963. With the privatization of the Japan National Railway (JNR) on 1 April 1987, the station came under the aegis of the West Japan railway Company (JR West). The station was out of operation from 28 July 2013 to 10 August 2014 due to damage to the line caused by torrential rains.

== Passenger statistics ==
In fiscal 2020, the station was used by an average of 8 passengers daily.

== Surrounding area ==
The station is located in the middle of the two rural districts of Uda and Sogo, and there are no houses in the surrounding area. In addition, the Sea of Japan spreads out in front of the station, and Japan National Route 191 runs between the station and the sea.

== See also ==
- List of railway stations in Japan
