= Abu District, Yamaguchi =

District in Yamaguchi Prefecture, Japan

Coordinates: 34.5307289°N 131.5812154°E

Location of Abu District in Yamaguchi Prefecture

Abu (阿武郡, Abu-gun) is a district located in Yamaguchi Prefecture, Japan.

As of 2010, the district has an estimated population of 3,731 and a population density of 32.1 persons per km^{2}. The total area is 116.07 km^{2}.

The district has only one town:

- Abu

The town of Abu and the municipalities of Asahi, Fukue, Kawakami, Mutsumi, Susa, and Tamagawa along with the city of Hagi created the regional government to cover the region known as the Hagi Regional Municipal Government. The town of Abu dropped out of the merger because of the indifferent relations with the city of Hagi. The remaining towns and villages and the city of Hagi merged on March 6, 2005 to form the new city of Hagi.

At one time, the town of Atō was scheduled to merge with the city of Yamaguchi, but failed to join the merger process. However, on January 16, 2010, the town of Atō merged into the city of Yamaguchi.
