= Higashi-Hagi Station =

Railway station in Hagi, Yamaguchi Prefecture, Japan

Higashi-Hagi Station 東萩駅
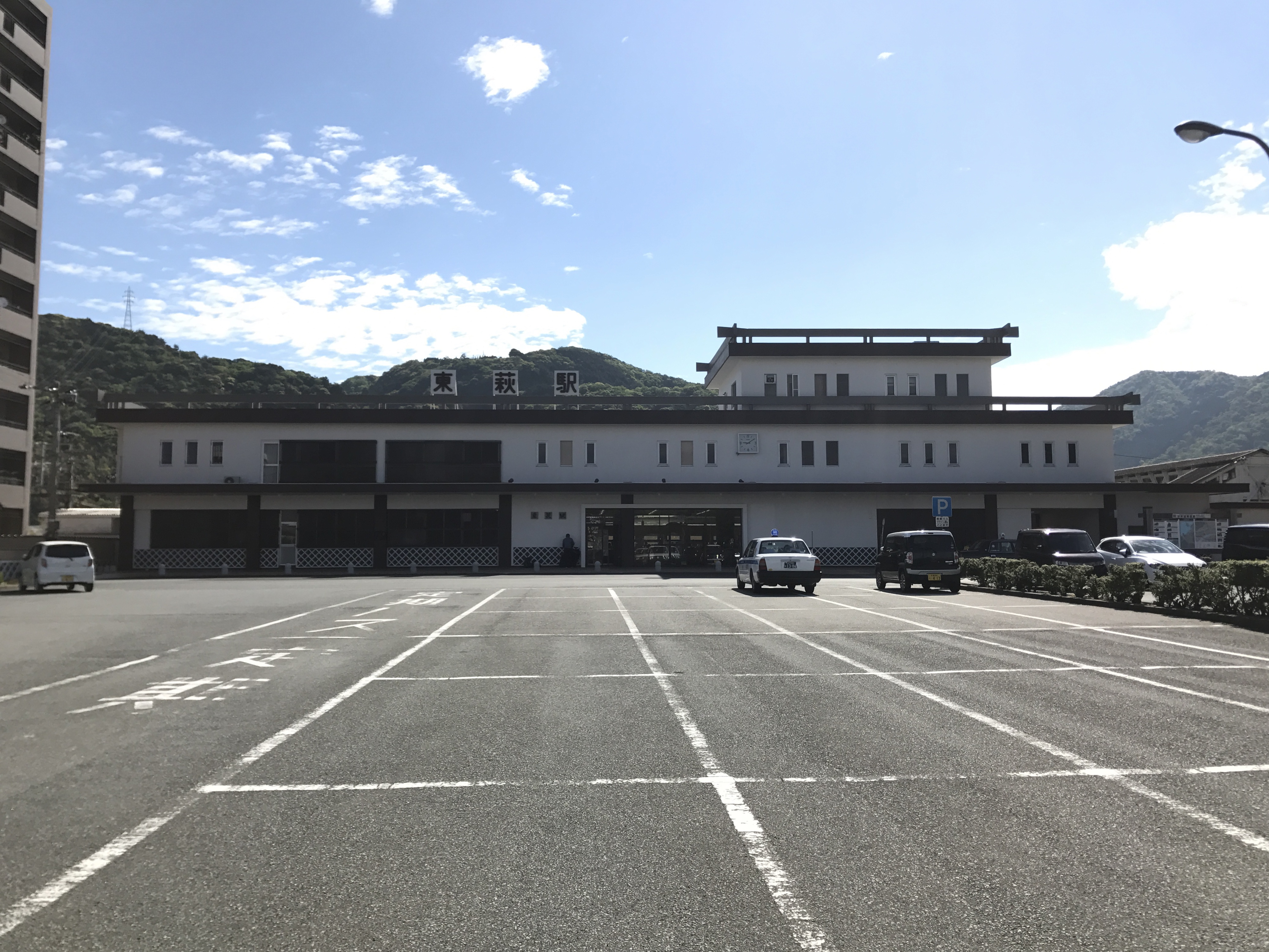
- Higashi-Hagi Station, May 2017

General information
- Location: 2997-3 Chintō Ōhirotsu, Hagi-shi, Yamaguchi-ken 758-0011; Japan
- Coordinates: 34°25′2″N 131°24′37″E
- Owner: West Japan Railway Company
- Operator: West Japan Railway Company
- Line: San'in Main Line
- Distance: 572.0 km (355.4 miles) from Kyoto
- Platforms: 1 side + 1 island platform
- Tracks: 3

Other information
- Status: Staffed
- Website: Official website

History
- Opened: 1 November 1925; 101 years ago

Passengers
- FY2020: 199

Services
| Preceding station | JR West | Following station |
|---|---|---|
| Hagi towards Shimonoseki | San'in Main Line E Local | Koshigahama towards Masuda |
Location
- Location within Yamaguchi Prefecture Location within Japan

Higashi-Hagi Station (東萩駅, Higashi-Hagi-eki) is a passenger railway station located in the city of Hagi, Yamaguchi Prefecture, Japan. It is operated by the West Japan Railway Company (JR West).

== Lines ==
Higashi-Hagi Station is served by the JR West San'in Main Line, and is located 572.0 kilometers from the terminus of the line at Kyoto.

== Station layout ==
The station consists of one side platform and one island platform. The station building is adjacent to the side platform and is connected to the island platform by a footbridge. The station is staffed.

== Platforms ==
| 1 | ■ San'in Main Line | for Masuda for Nagatoshi |
| 2 | ■ San'in Main Line | for Nagatoshi |
| 3 | ■ San'in Main Line | for Nagatoshi for Masuda |

== History ==
Higashi-Hagi Station was opened on 1 November 1925 when the Japan Government Railways Mine Line was extended from Hagi Station. The line was further extended to Nago Station on 24 April 1929. This portion of the Mine Line was incorporated into the San'in Main Line in 1933. Freight operations were discontinued from 1 February 1963. The station building was rebuilt into a two-story reinforced concrete structure with white walls and reflecting a samurai residence in July 1973. With the privatization of the Japan National Railway (JNR) on 1 April 1987, the station came under the aegis of the West Japan Railway Company (JR West). Freight operations were discontinued from 31 December 1983.

== Passenger statistics ==
In fiscal 2020, the station was used by an average of 199 passengers daily.

== Surrounding area ==
There is an exit only on the west side of the station, which faces Hagi Rainbow Plaza, a facility that integrates a souvenir shop, a rental cycle, and a tourist hotel. In addition, high-rise condominiums are built in front of the station.

- Shoin Shrine
- Shokasonjuku
- Former House of Yoshida Shoin
- Ito Hirobumi Former Residence
- Toko-ji Temple
- Hagi Reverberatory Furnace ruins

== See also ==
- List of railway stations in Japan
