= Hane Station =

Railway station in Ōda, Shimane Prefecture, Japan

Hane Station 波根駅
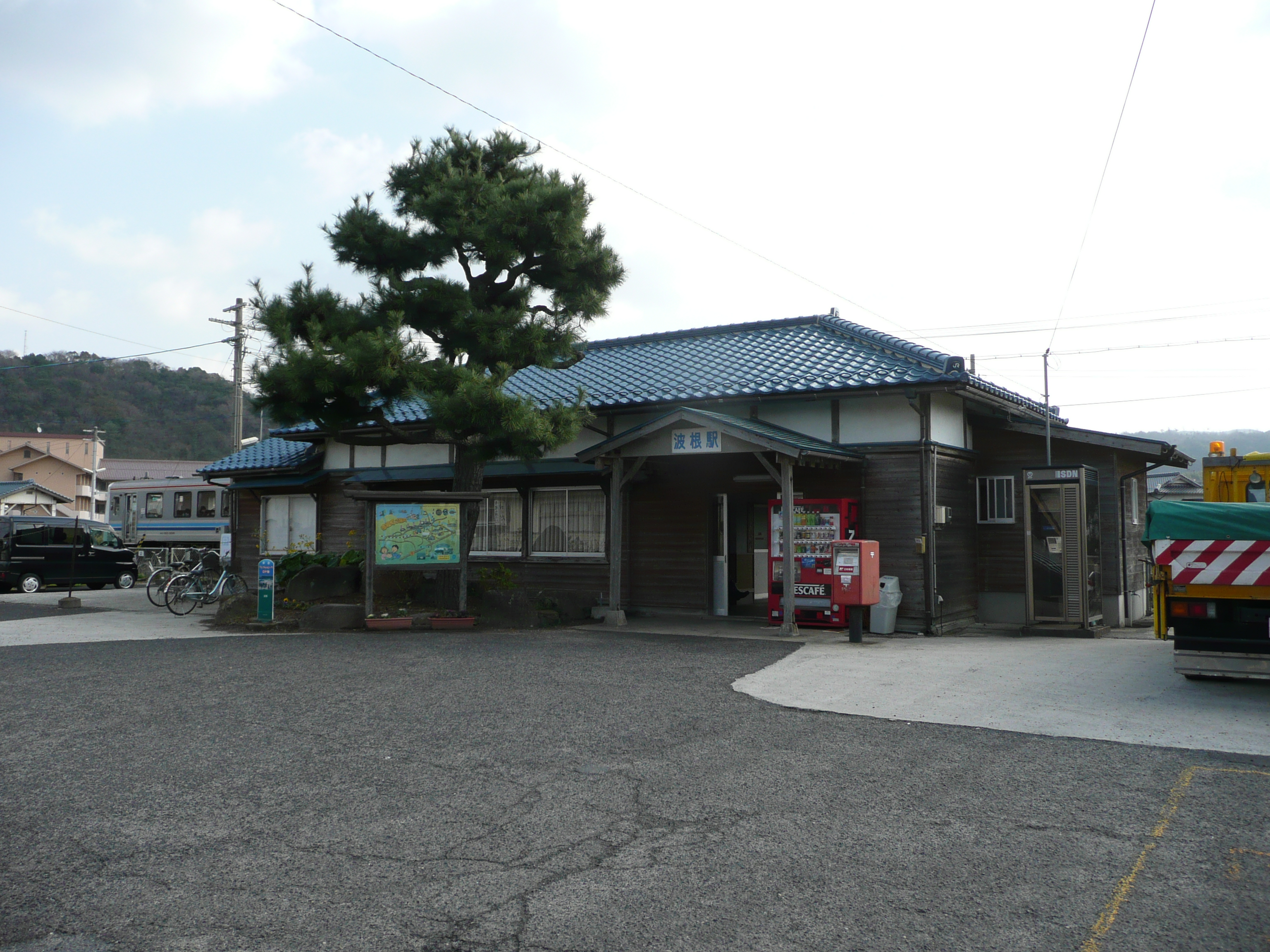
- Hane Station

General information
- Location: 1327 Nakahama, Hane-chō, Ōda-shi, Shimane-ken 699-2211; Japan
- Coordinates: 35°14′24.95″N 132°31′33.88″E
- Owner: West Japan Railway Company
- Operator: West Japan Railway Company
- Line: D San'in Main Line
- Distance: 411.5 km (255.7 miles) from Kyoto
- Platforms: 1 island platform
- Tracks: 2

Other information
- Status: Unstaffed
- Website: Official website

History
- Opened: 11 July 1915

Passengers
- FY2020: 36

Services
Preceding station	JR West	Following station
Kute towards Masuda	San'in Line	Tagi towards Yonago
Location
- Location within Shimane Prefecture Location within Japan

Hane Station (波根駅, Hane-eki) is a passenger railway station located in the city of Ōda, Shimane Prefecture, Japan. It is operated by the West Japan Railway Company (JR West).

== Lines ==
Hane Station is served by the JR West San'in Main Line, and is located 411.5 kilometers from the terminus of the line at Kyoto.

== Station layout ==
The station consists of one island platform connected to the station building by a level crossing. The station is unattended.

== Platforms ==
1	■ D San'in Main Line	for Izumoshi, and Matsue
2	■ D San'in Main Line	for Ōdashi and Hamada

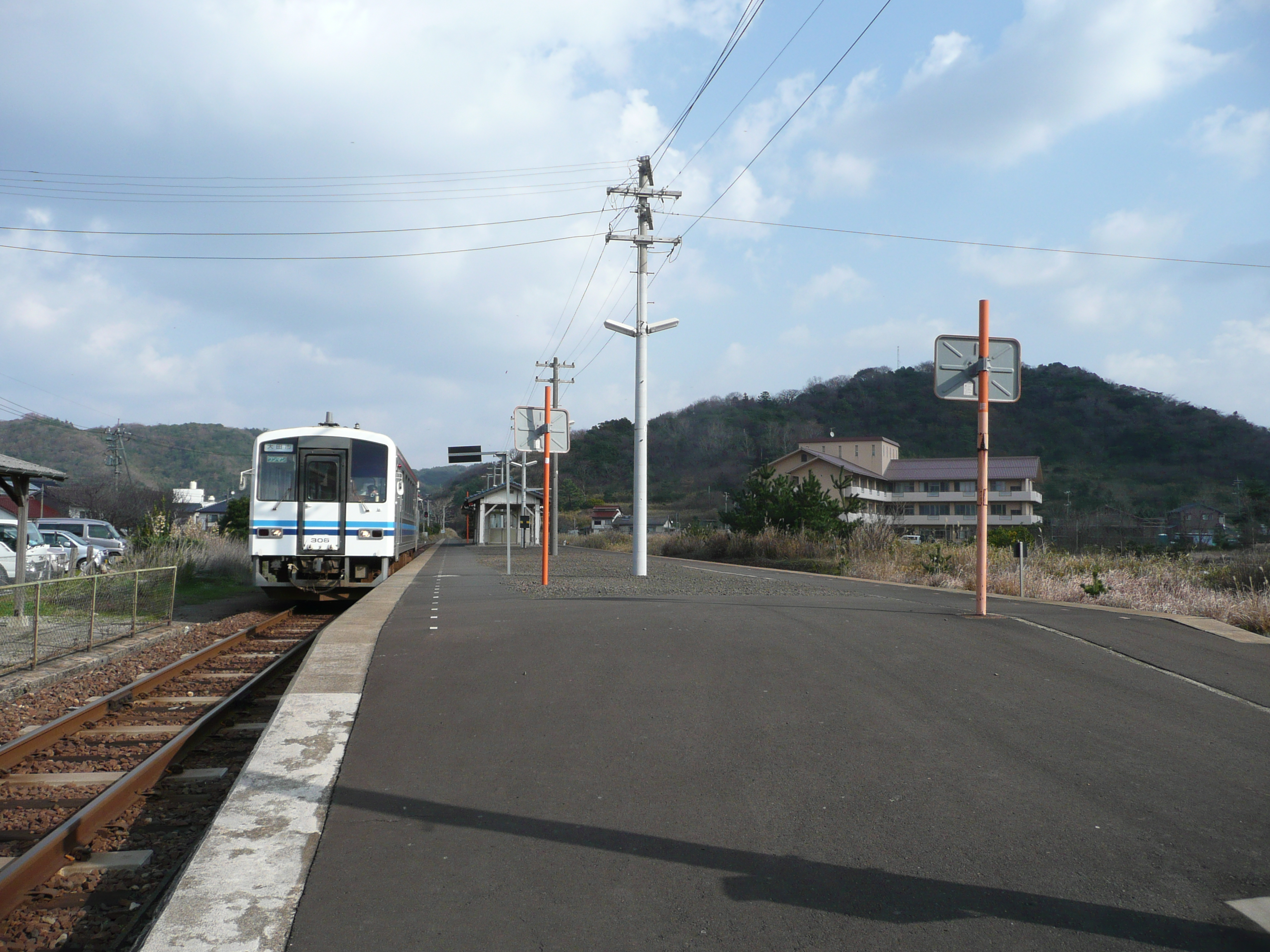
Platforms, December, 2010

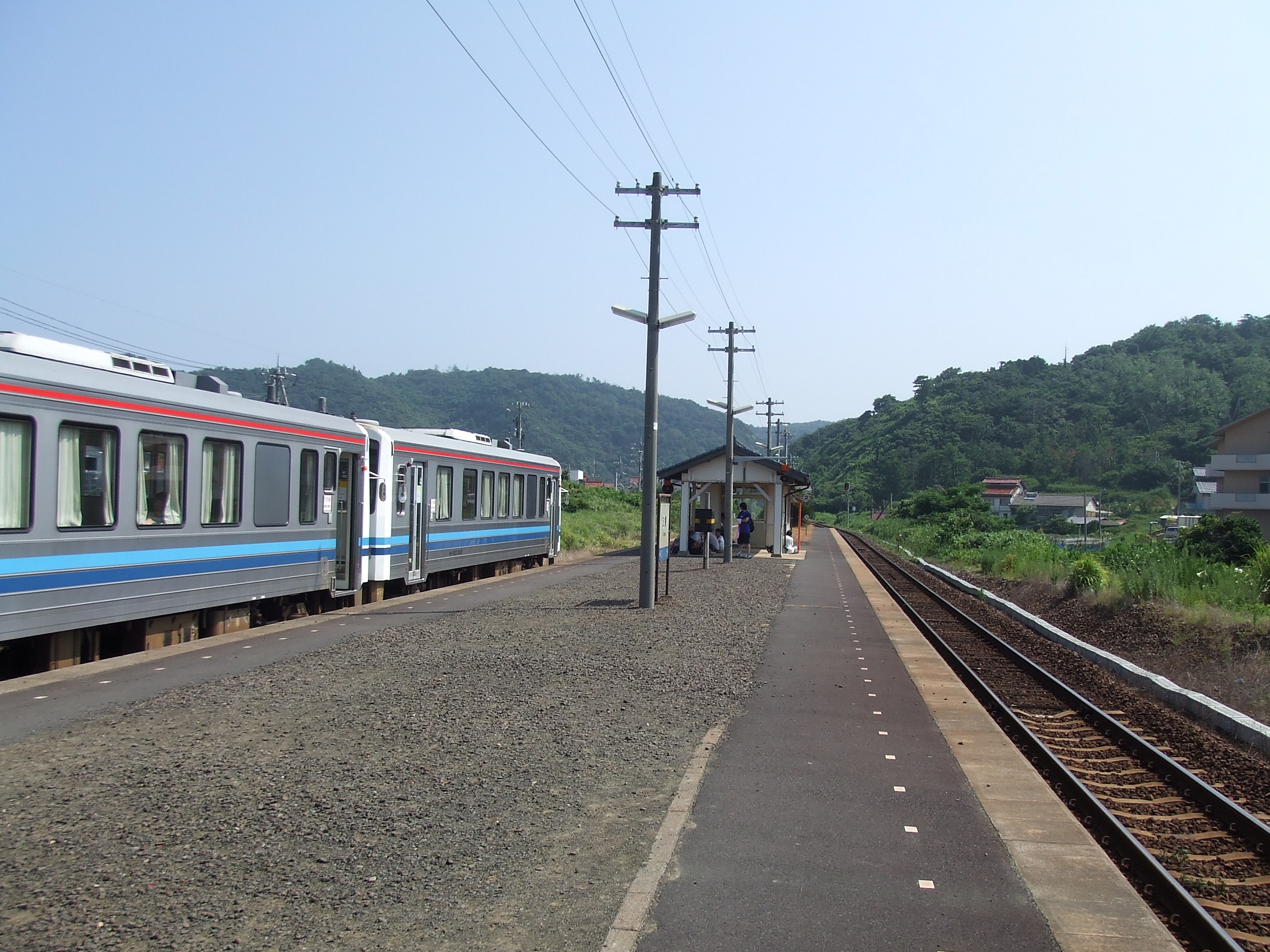
Platforms, August 2006

== History ==
Hane Station was opened on 11 July 1915 when the San'in Main Line was extended from Oda Station to Iwami-Ōda Station (currently Ōdashi Station). With the privatization of the Japan National Railway (JNR) on 1 April 1987, the station came under the aegis of the West Japan railway Company (JR West).

== Passenger statistics ==
In fiscal 2020, the station was used by an average of 36 passengers daily.

== Surrounding area ==
- Hane Beach
- Hane District Industrial Park
- Shimane Prefectural University of Agriculture and Forestry

== See also ==
- List of railway stations in Japan
