= 江南駅 =

江南駅 or 江南驛 may refer to:

- Gangnam station
- Kōnan Station (disambiguation)
  - Kōnan Station (Aichi)
  - Kōnan Station (Shimane)
