= Nishi-Izumo Station =

Railway station in Izumo, Shimane Prefecture, Japan

Nishi-Izumo Station 西出雲駅
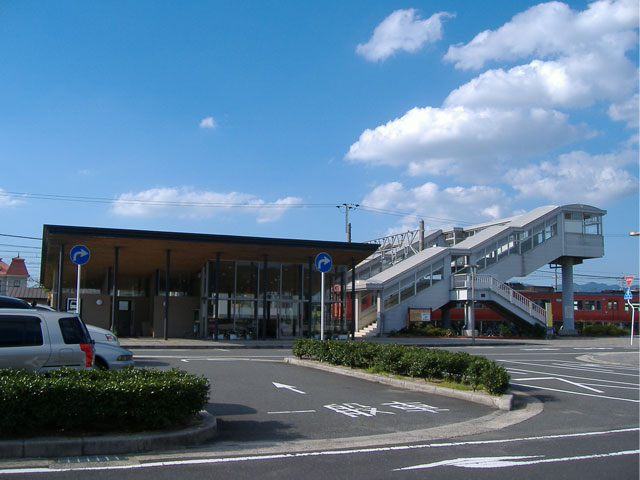
- Nishi-Izumo Station, September 2007

General information
- Location: 985, Chiimiya-chō Kagi, Izumo-shi, Shimane-ken 693-0033; Japan
- Coordinates: 35°20′5.62″N 132°43′18.54″E
- Owner: West Japan Railway Company
- Operator: West Japan Railway Company
- Line: D San'in Main Line
- Distance: 389.4 km (242.0 miles) from Kyoto
- Platforms: 1 island platform
- Tracks: 2
- Connections: Bus stop

Construction
- Structure type: At grade

Other information
- Status: Unstaffed
- Website: Official website

History
- Opened: 21 November 1913
- Former names: Chiimiya (until 1993)

Passengers
- FY 2020: 257 daily (boarding only)

Services
Preceding station	JR West	Following station
Izumo-Jinzai towards Masuda	San'in Line Local	Izumoshi towards Yonago
Location
- Location within Shimane Prefecture Location within Japan

Nishi-Izumo Station (西出雲駅, Nishi-Izumo-eki) is a passenger railway station located in the city of Izumo, Shimane Prefecture, Japan. It is operated by the West Japan Railway Company (JR West).

== Lines ==
Nishi-Izumo Station is served by the JR West San'in Main Line, and is located 389.4 kilometers from the terminus of the line at Kyoto.

== Station layout ==
The station consists of one island platform connected to the station building by a footbridge. The station building used to be on the north side of the station, but it was demolished, and now there is a waiting room-sized station building on the south side. The station is unattended.

== Platforms ==
1	■ D San'in Main Line	for Izumoshi, and Matsue
2	■ D San'in Main Line	for Ōdashi and Hamada

== Gallery ==
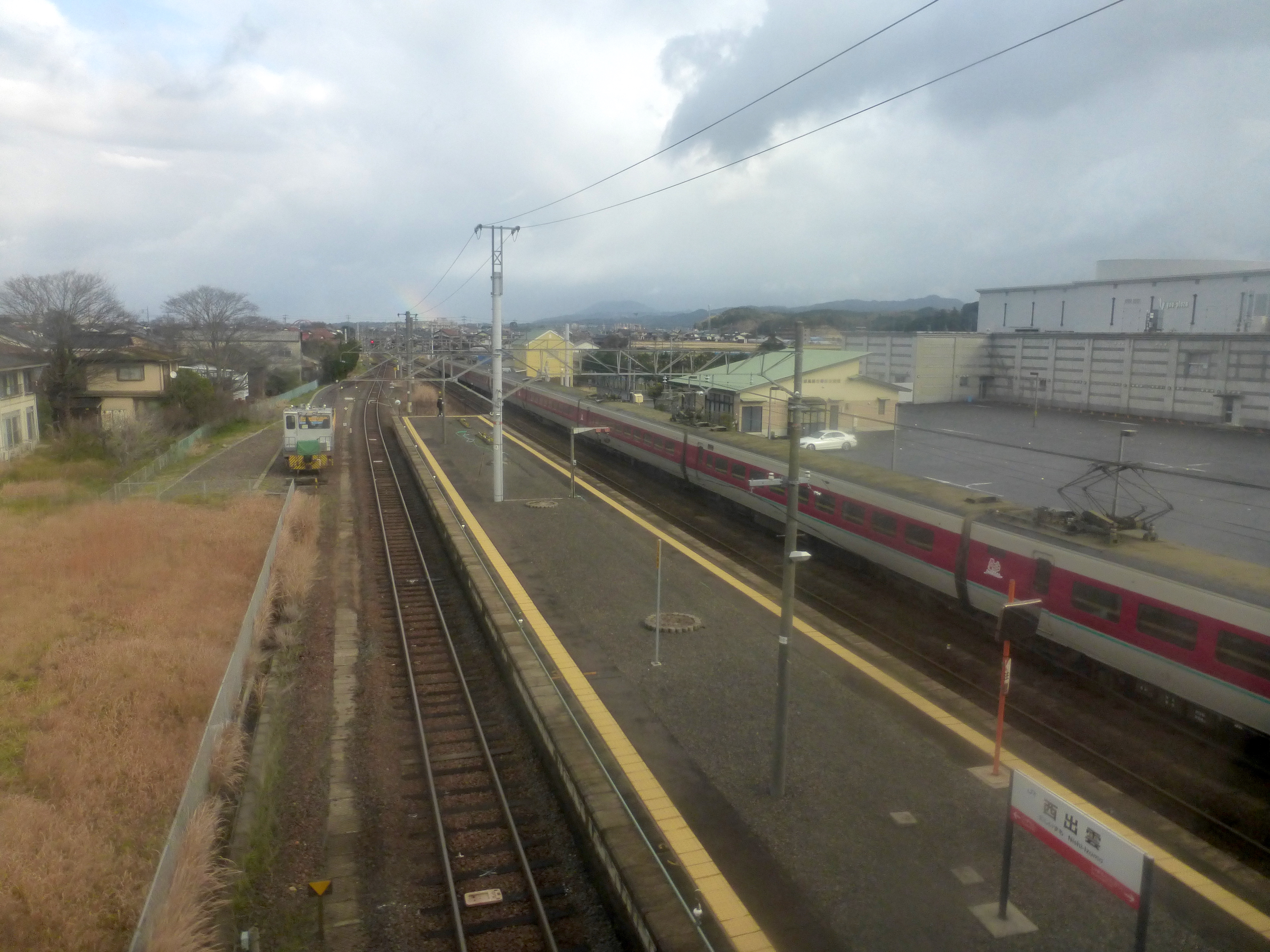
Platforms, 2018

== History ==
Nishi-Izumo Station opened on 21 November 1913 as Chiinomiya Station (知井宮駅, Chiinomiya-eki). It was renamed to its present name on 18 April 1990. With the privatization of the Japan National Railway (JNR) on 1 April 1987, the station came under the aegis of the West Japan Railway Company (JR West).

== Passenger statistics ==
In fiscal 2020, the station was used by an average of 257 passengers daily.

== Surrounding area ==
- Izumo Nishi High School -The school's Interact club sometimes volunteers to clean the station.
- Izumo Municipal Henan Junior High School
- Izumo City Kodogawa Elementary School
- Masayugaoka Park

== See also ==
- List of railway stations in Japan
