= Kute Station =

Railway station in Ōda, Shimane Prefecture, Japan

Kute Station 久手駅
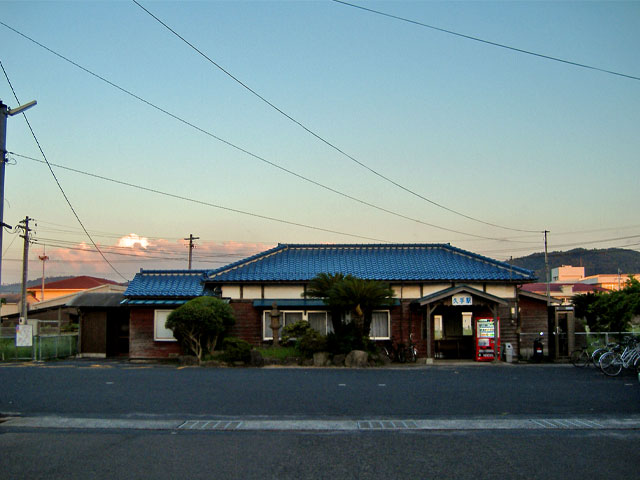
- Kute Station in September 2007

General information
- Location: 1762, Kute-chō Hanenishi, Ōda-shi, Shimane-ken 694-0051; Japan
- Coordinates: 35°13′46.18″N 132°30′29.50″E
- Owner: West Japan Railway Company
- Operator: West Japan Railway Company
- Line: D San'in Main Line
- Distance: 414.7 km (257.7 miles) from Kyoto
- Platforms: 1 side platform
- Tracks: 1

Construction
- Structure type: At grade

Other information
- Status: Unstaffed
- Website: Official website

History
- Opened: 11 July 1915

Passengers
- FY2020: 251

Services
Preceding station	JR West	Following station
Ōdashi towards Masuda	San'in Line	Hane towards Yonago
Location
- Location within Shimane Prefecture Location within Japan

Kute Station (久手駅, Kute-eki) is a passenger railway station located in the city of Ōda, Shimane Prefecture, Japan. It is operated by the West Japan Railway Company (JR West).

== Lines ==
Kute Station is served by the JR West San'in Main Line, and is located 413.7 kilometers from the terminus of the line at Kyoto.

== Station layout ==
The station consists of one side platform serving a single bi-directional track. It used to be an island platform, but with the speeding up of the San'in Line in 2001, the tracks on the side of the station building were removed. The station is unattended.

== History ==
Kute Station was opened on 11 July 1915 when the San'in Main Line was extended from Iwami-Ōda Station (currently Ōdashi Station). The line was further extended to Oda Station. With the privatization of the Japan National Railway (JNR) on 1 April 1987, the station came under the aegis of the West Japan railway Company (JR West).

== Passenger statistics ==
In fiscal 2020, the station was used by an average of 47 passengers daily.

== Surrounding area ==
- Petrified wood of Hane-Nishi
- Ōda Municipal Kute Elementary School
- Ōda Municipal Second Junior High School
- Japan National Route 9

== See also ==
- List of railway stations in Japan
