= Tagi =

Tagi may refer to:

- Tagi, a tribe in Survivor: Borneo
- Tagi, local Samoan name for Gymnosarda unicolor, a species of fish
- Tagi, abbreviation for the name of the newspaper Tages Anzeiger in Zurich, Switzerland

People:

- Tagi (Ginti mayor), mayor/ruler of 1350 BC Amarna letters city Gingots in Canada

Places:

- Nakhl Taqi - a city in iraq
- Taji - also known as Tagi, Iraq
- Tagi Station, a railway station in Japan

In fiction:

- Tagi, a character from the online video series Pure Pwnage
