= Shōbara Station =

Railway station in Izumo, Shimane Prefecture, Japan

Shōbara Station 荘原駅
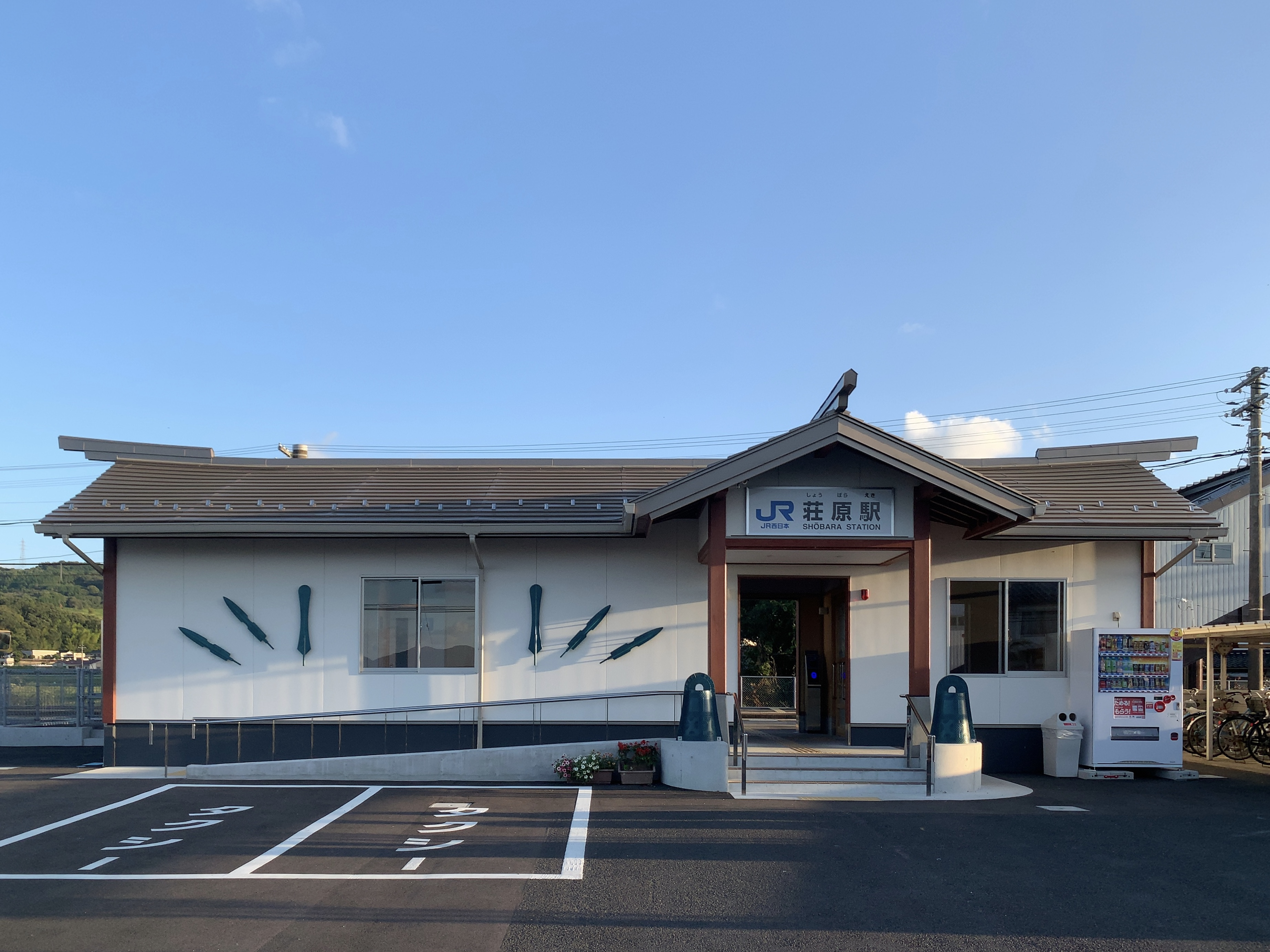
- Shōbara Station, October 2020

General information
- Location: 1606 Gakutō, Hikawa-chō, Izumo-shi, Shimane-ken 699-0501; Japan
- Coordinates: 35°23′37.21″N 132°52′5.53″E
- Owner: West Japan Railway Company
- Operator: West Japan Railway Company
- Line: D San'in Main Line
- Distance: 389.4 km (242.0 miles) from Kyoto
- Platforms: 2 side platforms
- Tracks: 2
- Connections: Bus stop

Construction
- Structure type: At grade

Other information
- Status: Unstaffed
- Website: Official website

History
- Opened: 10 June 1910

Passengers
- FY 2020: 281 daily (boarding only)

Services
Preceding station	JR West	Following station
Naoe towards Masuda	San'in Line Local	Shinji towards Yonago
Location
- Location within Shimane Prefecture Location within Japan

Shōbara Station (荘原駅, Shōbara-eki) is a passenger railway station located in the city of Izumo, Shimane Prefecture, Japan. It is operated by the West Japan Railway Company (JR West).

== Lines ==
Shōbara Station is served by the JR West San'in Main Line, and is located 373.0 kilometers from the terminus of the line at Kyoto.

== Station layout ==
The station consists of two opposed side platforms connected to the station building by a footbridge. The outer side platform was originally an island platform, but due to the San'in Line speed increase project, the outer track on the island platform was removed. Most of the trains arriving at and departing from this station stop on the side of the station building, which eliminates the need to cross the footbridge. The station is unattended.

== Platforms ==
1, 2	■ D San'in Main Line	for Izumoshi, and Matsue for Ōdashi and Hamada

== History ==
Shōbara Station opened on 10 June 1910. With the privatization of the Japan National Railway (JNR) on 1 April 1987, the station came under the aegis of the West Japan Railway Company (JR West).

== Passenger statistics ==
In fiscal 2020, the station was used by an average of 281 passengers daily.

== Surrounding area ==
- Yunokawa Onsen
- Kōjindani Site, National Historic Site

== See also ==
- List of railway stations in Japan
