= Tagi Station =

Railway station in Izumo, Shimane Prefecture, Japan

Tagi Station 田儀駅
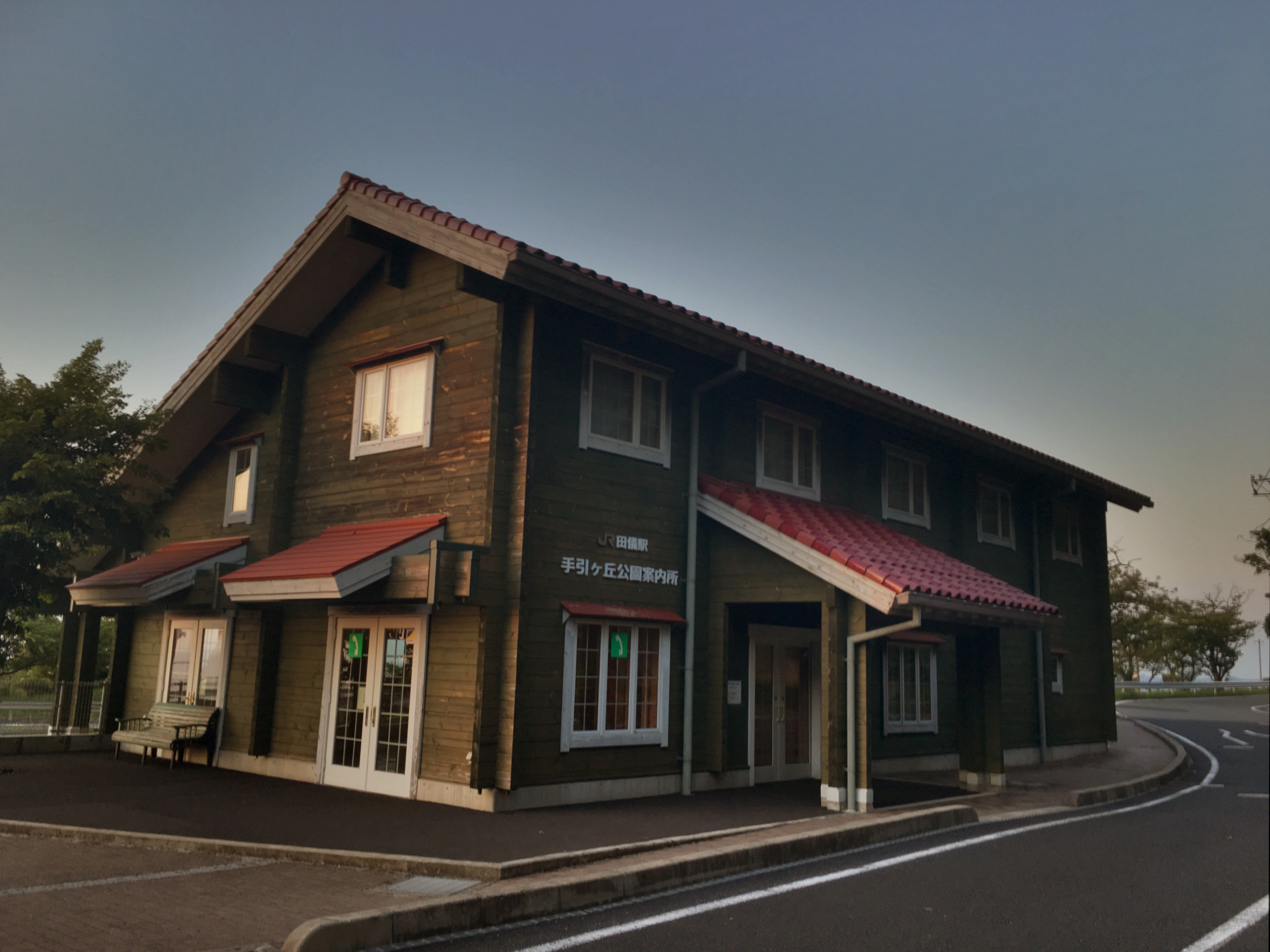
- Tagi Station, 2019

General information
- Location: 2016 Kuchitaki Taki-chō, Izumo-shi, Shimane-ken 699-0904; Japan
- Coordinates: 35°16′30.80″N 132°35′24.84″E
- Owner: West Japan Railway Company
- Operator: West Japan Railway Company
- Line: D San'in Main Line
- Distance: 404.0 km (251.0 miles) from Kyoto
- Platforms: 1 island platform
- Tracks: 2
- Connections: Bus stop

Construction
- Structure type: At grade

Other information
- Status: Unstaffed
- Website: Official website

History
- Opened: 11 July 1915

Passengers
- FY 2020: 30 daily (boarding only)

Services
Preceding station	JR West	Following station
Hane towards Masuda	San'in Line Local	Oda towards Yonago
Location
- Location within Shimane Prefecture Location within Japan

Tagi Station (田儀駅, Tagi-eki) is a passenger railway station located in the city of Izumo, Shimane Prefecture, Japan. It is operated by the West Japan Railway Company (JR West).

== Lines ==
Tagi Station is served by the JR West San'in Main Line, and is located 404.0 kilometers from the terminus of the line at Kyoto.

== Station layout ==
The station consists of one island platform connected to the station building by a level crossing. The station is unattended.

== Platforms ==
1	■ D San'in Main Line	for Izumoshi, and Matsue
2	■ D San'in Main Line	for Ōdashi and Hamada

== Gallery ==
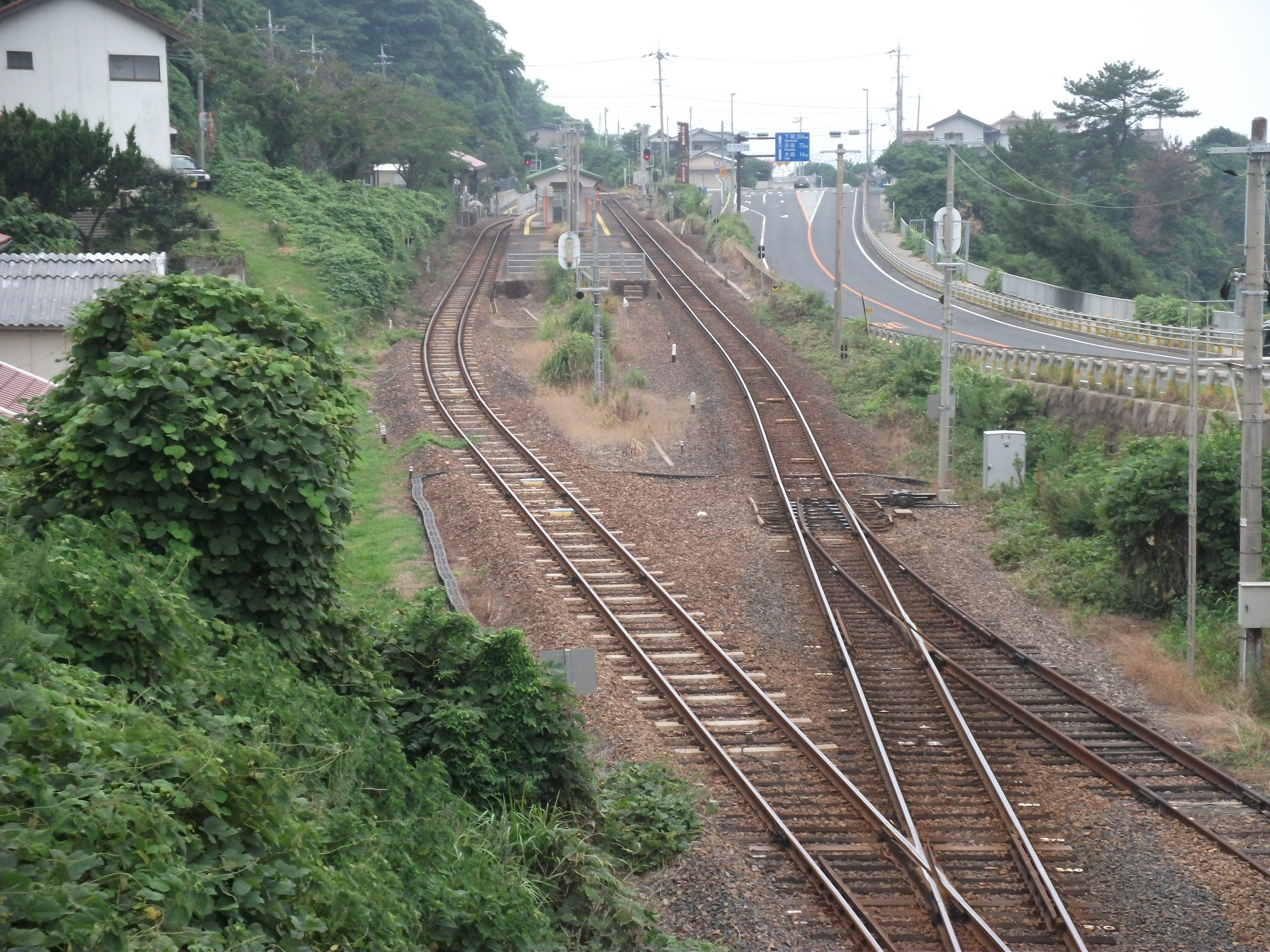
Station premises, July 2013

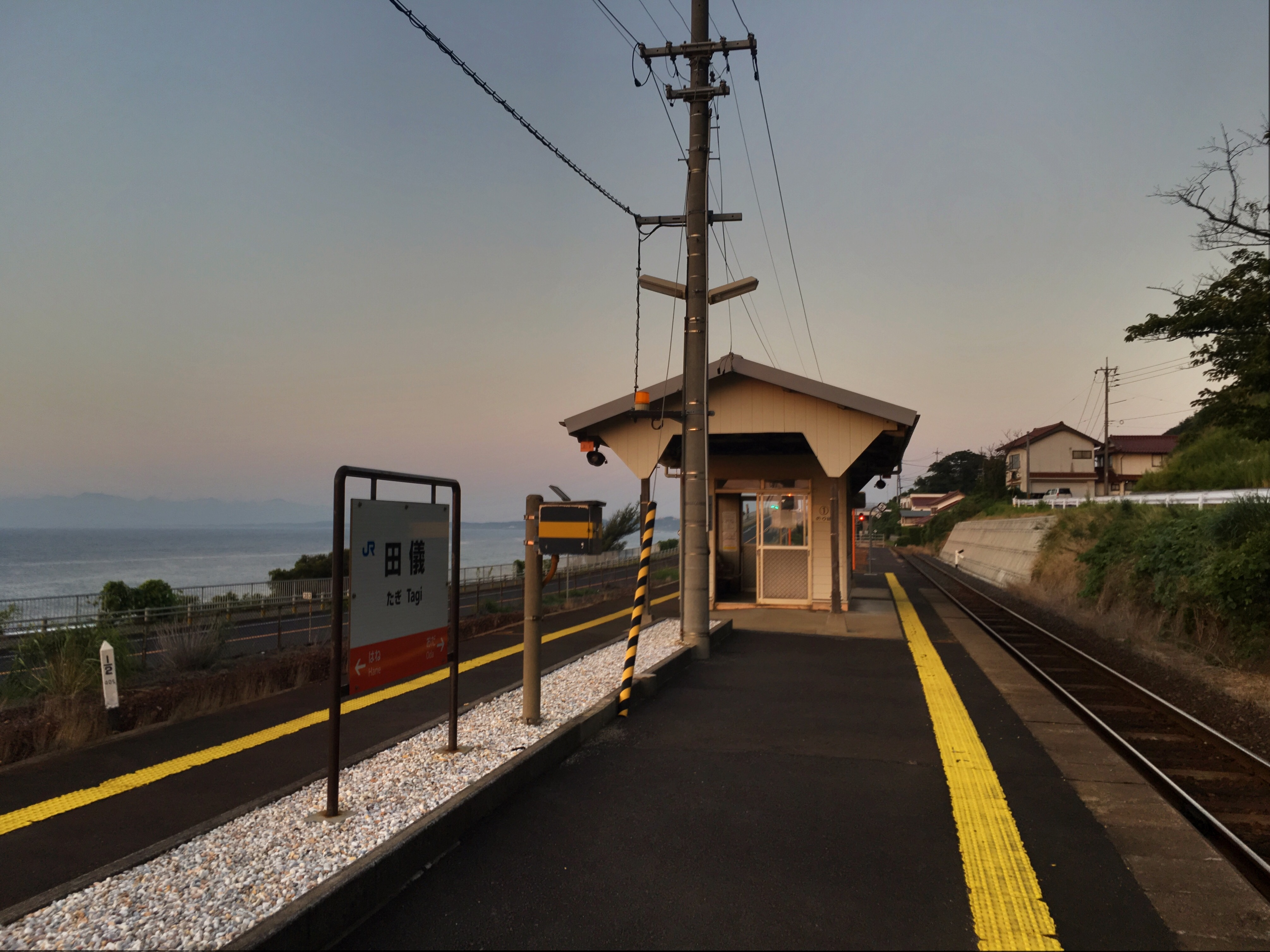
Station platforms, 2019

== History ==
Tagi Station was opened on 11 July 1915 when the San'in Main Line was extended from Oda Station to Iwami-Ōda Station (currently Ōdashi Station). With the privatization of the Japan National Railway (JNR) on 1 April 1987, the station came under the aegis of the West Japan Railway Company (JR West).

== Passenger statistics ==
In fiscal 2020, the station was used by an average of 30 passengers daily.

== Surrounding area ==
- Tehigaoka Park
- Tagi Beach
- Japan National Route 9

== See also ==
- List of railway stations in Japan
