= Naoe Station =

Railway station in Izumo, Shimane Prefecture, Japan

Naoe Station 直江駅
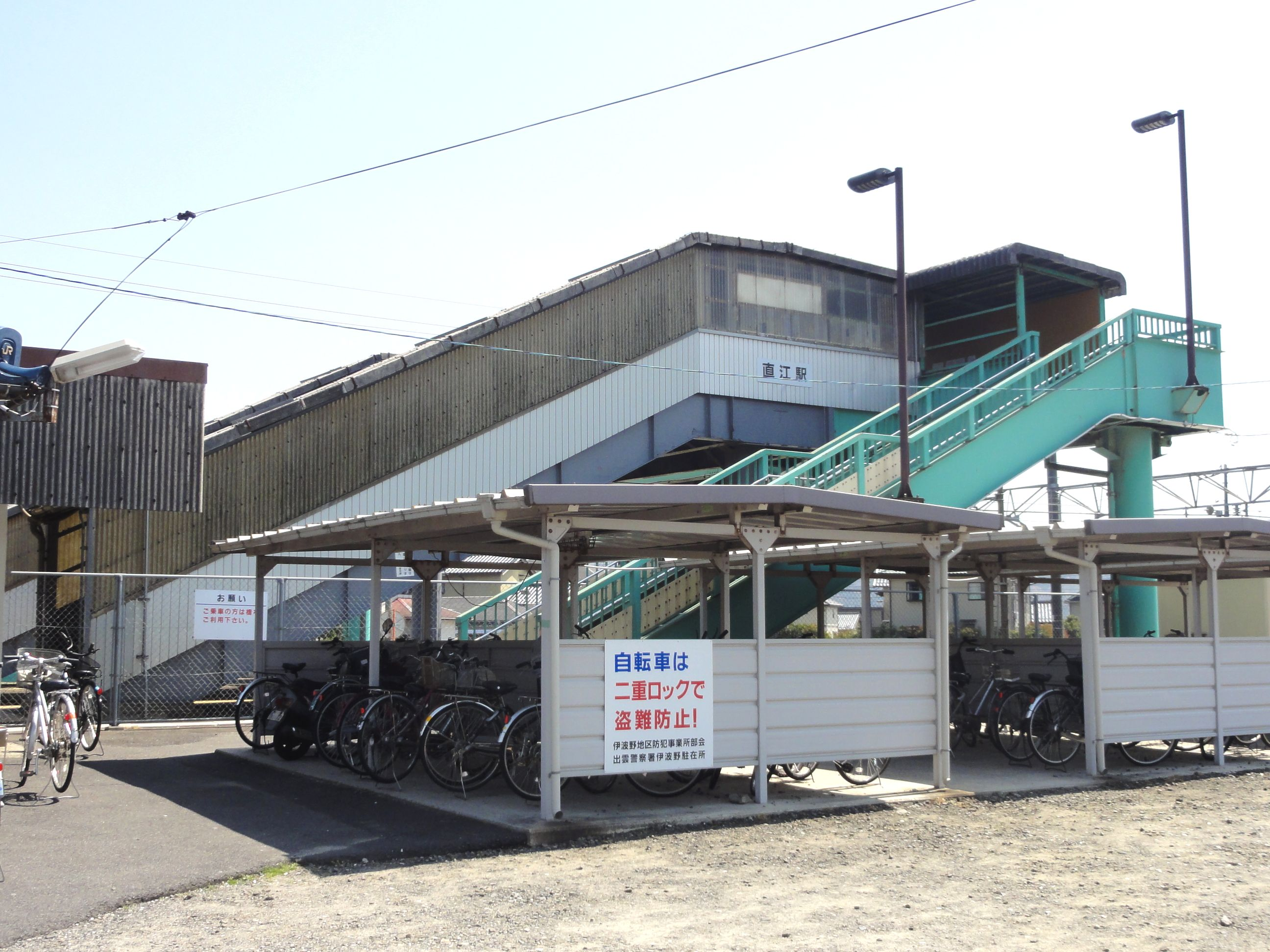
- Naoe Station North entrance

General information
- Location: 1100, Hikawa-chō Kaminaoe, Izumo-shi, Shimane-ken 699-0624; Japan
- Coordinates: 35°23′1.73″N 132°48′27.50″E
- Owner: West Japan Railway Company
- Operator: West Japan Railway Company
- Line: D San'in Main Line
- Distance: 479.1 km (297.7 miles) from Kyoto
- Platforms: 1 side + island platform
- Tracks: 3
- Connections: Bus stop

Construction
- Structure type: Elevated

Other information
- Status: Unstaffed
- Website: Official website

History
- Opened: 10 October 1910

Passengers
- FY 2020: 356 daily (boarding only)

Services
Preceding station	JR West	Following station
Izumoshi towards Masuda	San'in Line Local	Shōbara towards Yonago
Location
- Location within Shimane Prefecture Location within Japan

Naoe Station (直江駅, Naoe-eki) is a passenger railway station located in the city of Izumo, Shimane Prefecture, Japan. It is operated by the West Japan Railway Company (JR West).

== Lines ==
Naoe Station is served by the JR West San'in Main Line, and is located 379.1 kilometers from the terminus of the line at Kyoto.

== Station layout ==
The station consists of one side platform and island platform connected by an elevated station building. The original wooden station building also remains it situ. The station is unattended.

== Platforms ==
1	■ D San'in Main Line	for Matsue, and Yonago
2	■ D San'in Main Line	for Izumoshi and Ōdashi
3	■ D San'in Main Line	<siding>

== History ==
Naoe Station was opened on 10 October 1910 when the San'in Main Line was extended from Shōbara Station to Izumo-Imaichi Station (currently Izumoshi Station). With the privatization of the Japan National Railway (JNR) on 1 April 1987, the station came under the aegis of the West Japan Railway Company (JR West).

== Passenger statistics ==
In fiscal 2020, the station was used by an average of 356 passengers daily.

== Surrounding area ==
- Izumo Murata Manufacturing Co., Ltd.
- Japan National Route 9

== See also ==
- List of railway stations in Japan
