= Kōnan Station (Shimane) =

Railway station in Izumo, Shimane Prefecture, Japan

Kōnan Station 江南駅
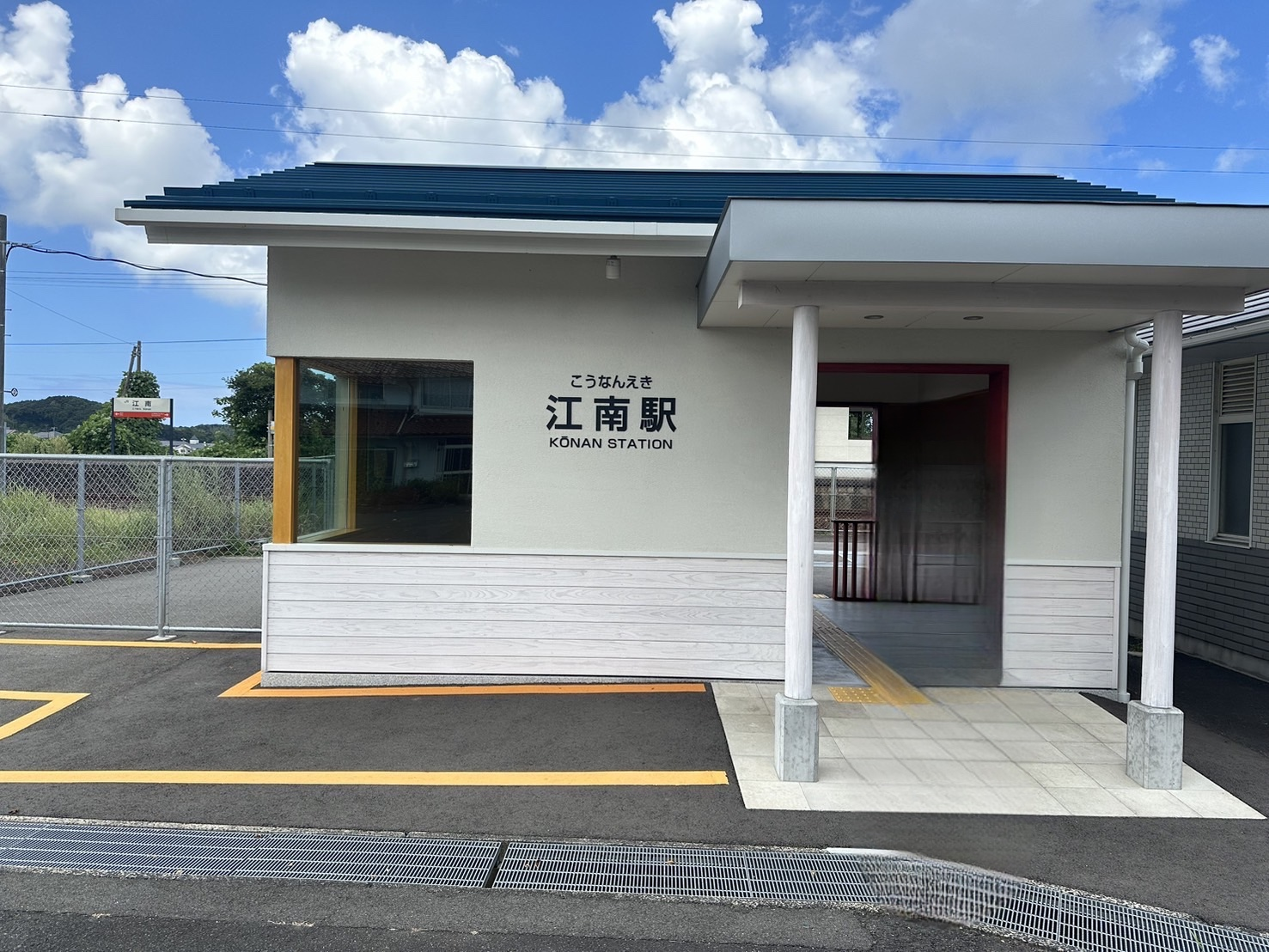
- Kōnan Station, August 2024

General information
- Location: 575, Koryō-chō Sambu, Izumo-shi, Shimane-ken 699-0813; Japan
- Coordinates: 35°18′55.76″N 132°41′0.91″E
- Owner: West Japan Railway Company
- Operator: West Japan Railway Company
- Line: D San'in Main Line
- Distance: 393.5 km (244.5 miles) from Kyoto
- Platforms: 1 island platform
- Tracks: 2
- Connections: Bus stop

Construction
- Structure type: At grade

Other information
- Status: Unstaffed
- Website: Official website

History
- Opened: 21 November 1913

Passengers
- FY 2020: 83 daily (boarding only)

Services
Preceding station	JR West	Following station
Oda towards Masuda	San'in Line Local	Izumo-Jinzai towards Yonago
Location
- Location within Shimane Prefecture Location within Japan

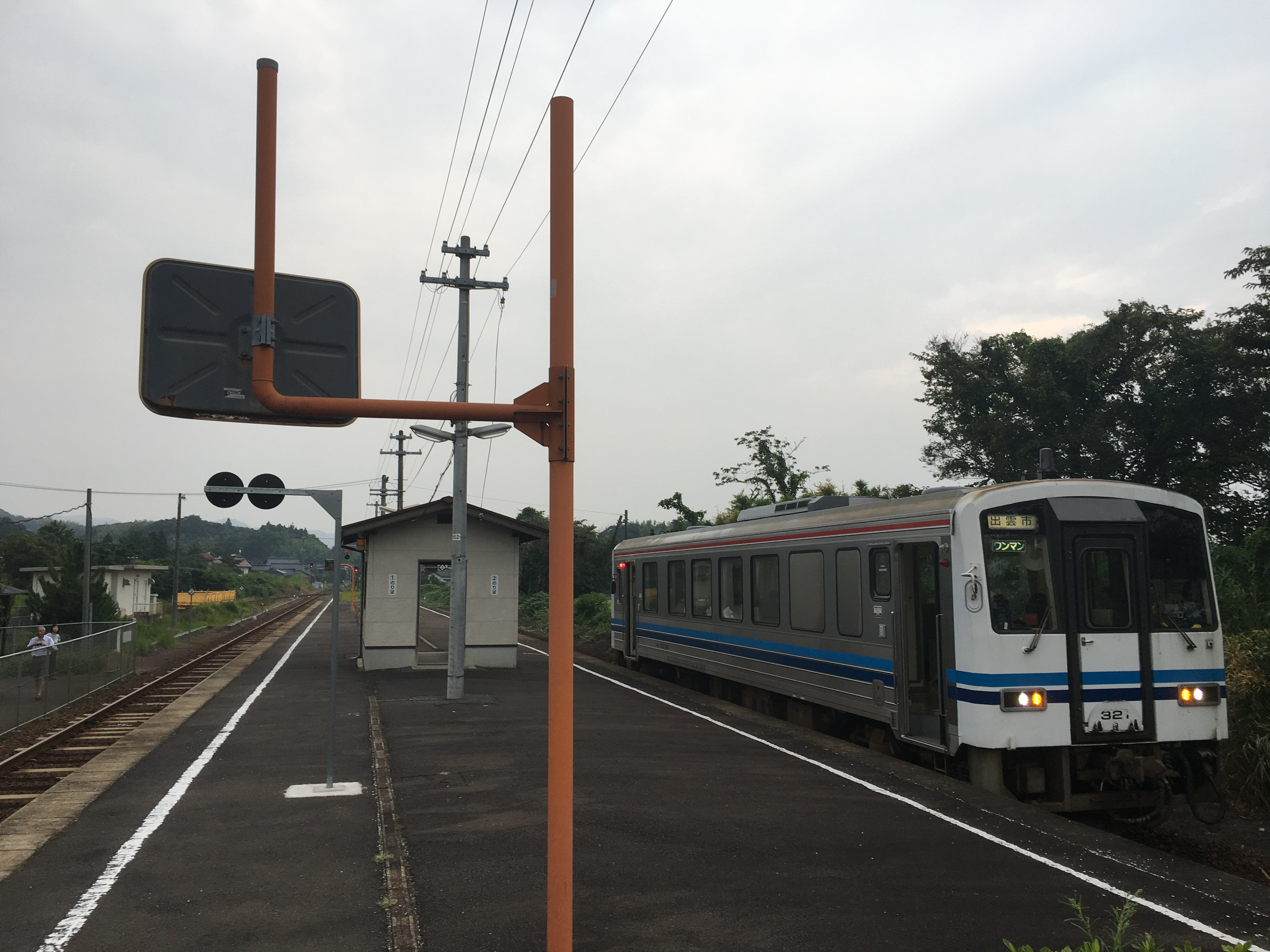
Station platforms, 2019

Kōnan Station (江南駅, Kōnan--eki) is a passenger railway station located in the city of Izumo, Shimane Prefecture, Japan. It is operated by the West Japan Railway Company (JR West).

== Lines ==
Kōnan Station is served by the JR West San'in Main Line, and is located 393.5 kilometers from the terminus of the line at Kyoto.

== Station layout ==
The station consists of one island platform connected to the station building by a level crossing. The station is unattended.

== Platforms ==
1	■ D San'in Main Line	for Izumoshi, and Matsue
2	■ D San'in Main Line	for Ōdashi and Hamada

== History ==
Kōnan Station was opened on 21 November 1913 when the San'in Main Line was extended between Izumo-Imaichi Station (currently Izumoshi Station) and Oda Station. With the privatization of the Japan National Railway (JNR) on 1 April 1987, the station came under the aegis of the West Japan Railway Company (JR West). In 2023 a new station building was opened.

== Passenger statistics ==
In fiscal 2020, the station was used by an average of 83 passengers daily.

== Surrounding area ==
- Lake Jinzai
- Shimane Prefectural Route 39 Koryo Kakeai Line

== See also ==
- List of railway stations in Japan
