= Izumo-Jinzai Station =

Railway station in Izumo, Shimane Prefecture, Japan

Izumo-Jinzai Station 出雲神西駅
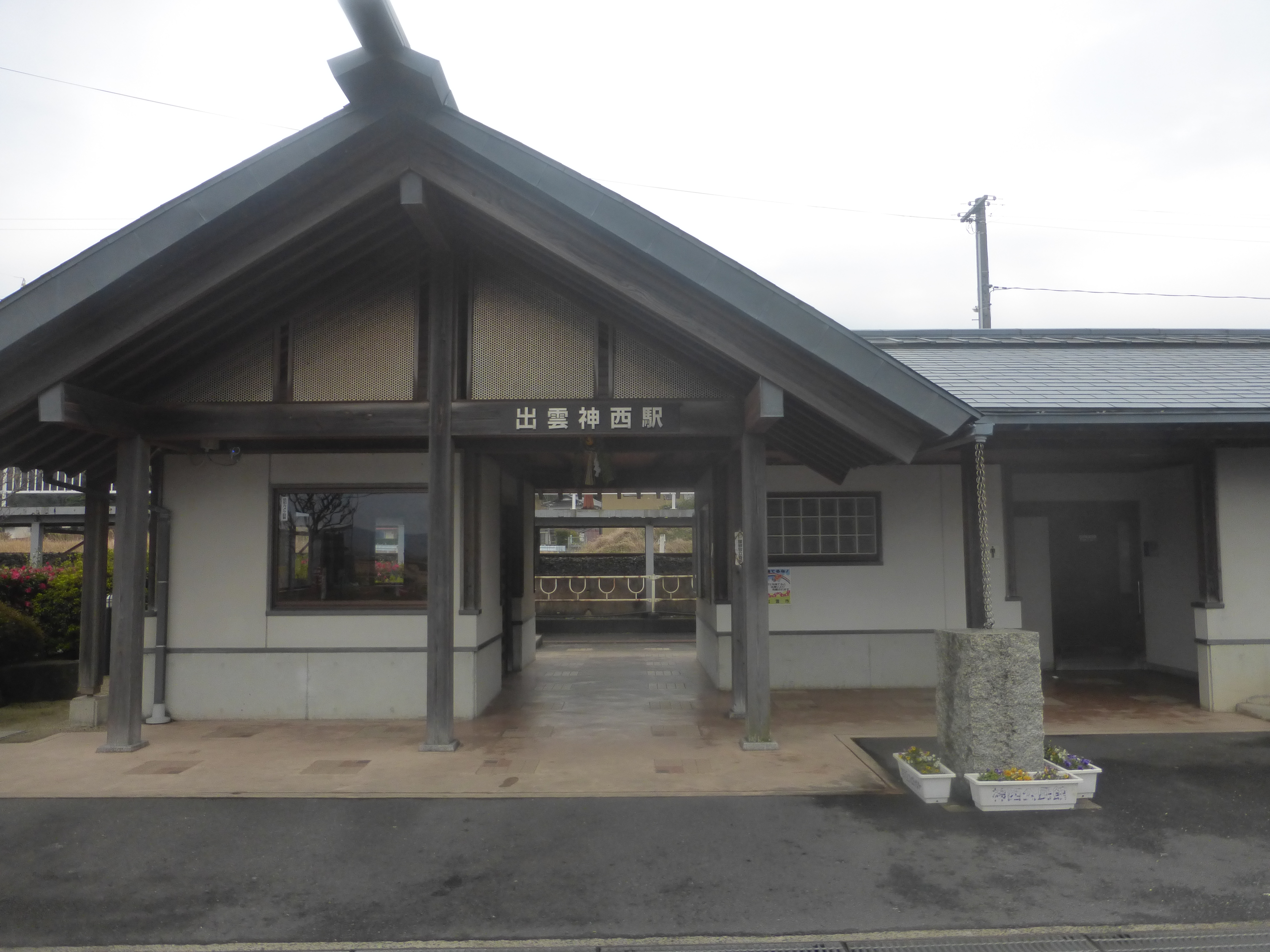
- Izumo-Jinzai Station, 2018

General information
- Location: 395, Higashijinzai-chō, Izumo-shi, Shimane-ken 699-0823; Japan
- Coordinates: 35°19′32.02″N 132°42′10.72″E
- Owner: West Japan Railway Company
- Operator: West Japan Railway Company
- Line: D San'in Main Line
- Distance: 391.4 km (243.2 miles) from Kyoto
- Platforms: 1 side platform
- Tracks: 1
- Connections: Bus stop

Construction
- Structure type: At grade

Other information
- Status: Unstaffed
- Website: Official website

History
- Opened: 1 July 1982
- Former names: Jinzai (until 1993); Izumotaisha-guchi (until 1999)

Passengers
- FY 2020: 51 daily (boarding only)

Services
Preceding station	JR West	Following station
Kōnan towards Masuda	San'in Line Local	Nishi-Izumo towards Yonago
Location
- Location within Shimane Prefecture Location within Japan

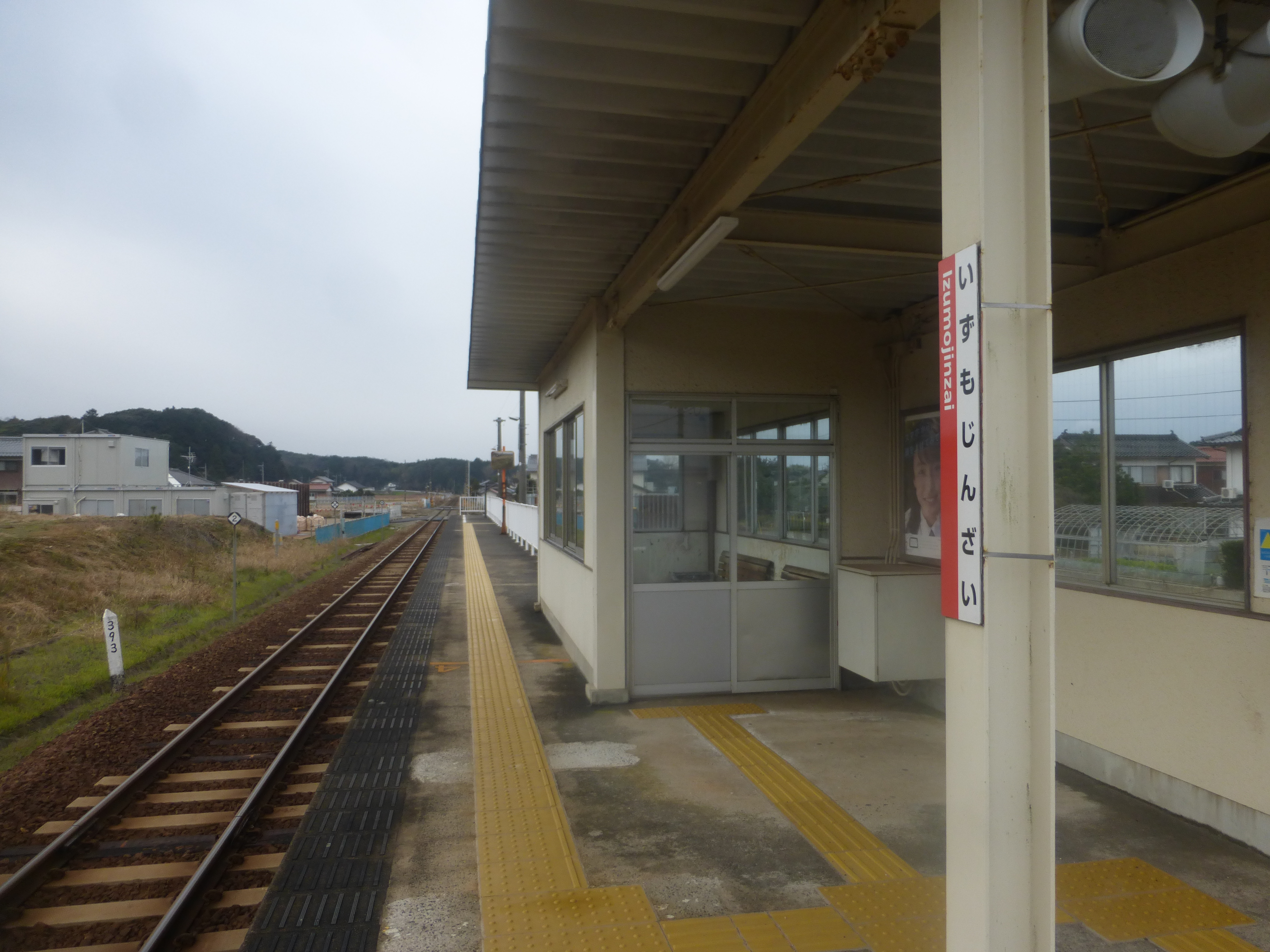
Platforms, 2018

Izumo-Jinzai Station (出雲神西駅, Izumo-Jinzai-eki) is a passenger railway station located in the city of Izumo, Shimane Prefecture, Japan. It is operated by the West Japan Railway Company (JR West).

== Lines ==
Izumo-Jinzai Station is served by the JR West San'in Main Line, and is located 391.4 kilometers from the terminus of the line at Kyoto.

== Station layout ==
The station consists of a single side platform serving one bi-directional track. The station is unattended.

== History ==
Izumo-Jinzai Station opened on 1 July 1982 as Jinzai Station (神西駅, Jinzai-eki). It was renamed to Izumotaisha-guchi Station (出雲大社口駅, Izumotaisha-guchi-eki) on 18 March 1993, and again to its present name on 13 March 1999.

== Passenger statistics ==
In fiscal 2020, the station was used by an average of 51 passengers daily.

== Surrounding area ==
- Izumo City Kanzaki Elementary School
- Izumo Municipal Henan Junior High School
- Lake Jinzai
- Japan National Route 9

== See also ==
- List of railway stations in Japan
