= Kōnan Station =

Kōnan Station is the name of three train stations in Japan:

- Kōnan Station (Shiga) (甲南駅)
- Kōnan Station (Aichi) (江南駅)
- Kōnan Station (Shimane) (江南駅)
