= Oda Station (Shimane) =

Railway station in Izumo, Shimane Prefecture, Japan

Oda Station 小田駅
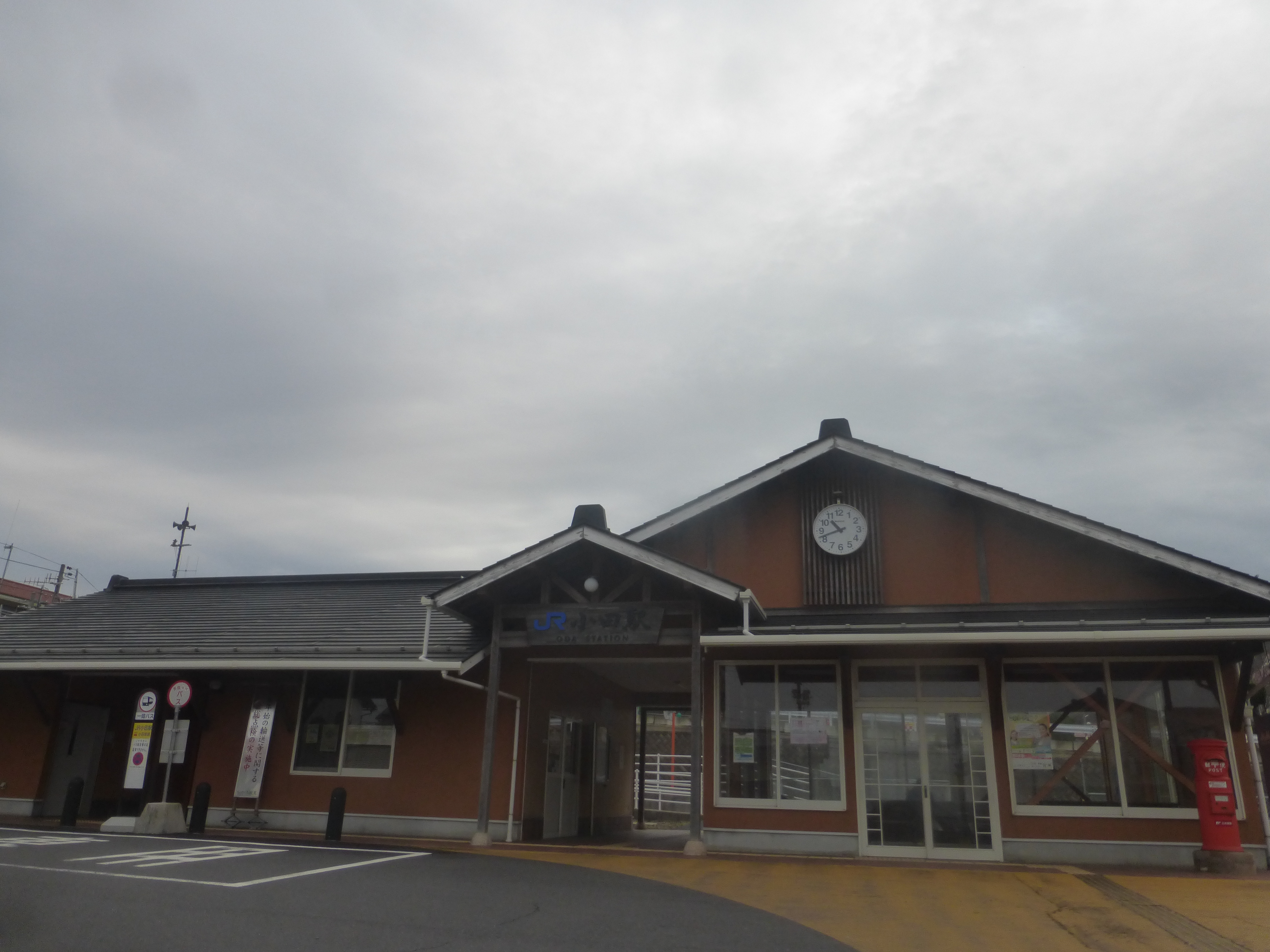
- Oda Station, 2018

General information
- Location: 814 Taki, Taki-chō, Izumo-shi, Shimane-ken 699-0902; Japan
- Coordinates: 35°17′4.49″N 132°37′46.48″E
- Owner: West Japan Railway Company
- Operator: West Japan Railway Company
- Line: D San'in Main Line
- Distance: 400.1 km (248.6 miles) from Kyoto
- Platforms: 1 side platform
- Tracks: 1
- Connections: Bus stop

Construction
- Structure type: At grade

Other information
- Status: Unstaffed
- Website: Official website

History
- Opened: 21 December 1913

Passengers
- FY 2020: 60 daily (boarding only)

Services
Preceding station	JR West	Following station
Tagi towards Masuda	San'in Line Local	Kōnan towards Yonago
Location
- Location within Shimane Prefecture Location within Japan

Oda Station (小田駅, Oda-eki) is a passenger railway station located in the city of Izumo, Shimane Prefecture, Japan. It is operated by the West Japan Railway Company (JR West).

== Lines ==
Oda Station is served by the JR West San'in Main Line, and is located 400.1 kilometers from the terminus of the line at Kyoto.

== Station layout ==
The station consists of one ground-level side platform serving a single bi-directional track. The station used to have one island platform with two tracks, but during construction to speed up the San'in Main Line, the tracks on the station building side were removed. The station is unattended.

== Gallery ==
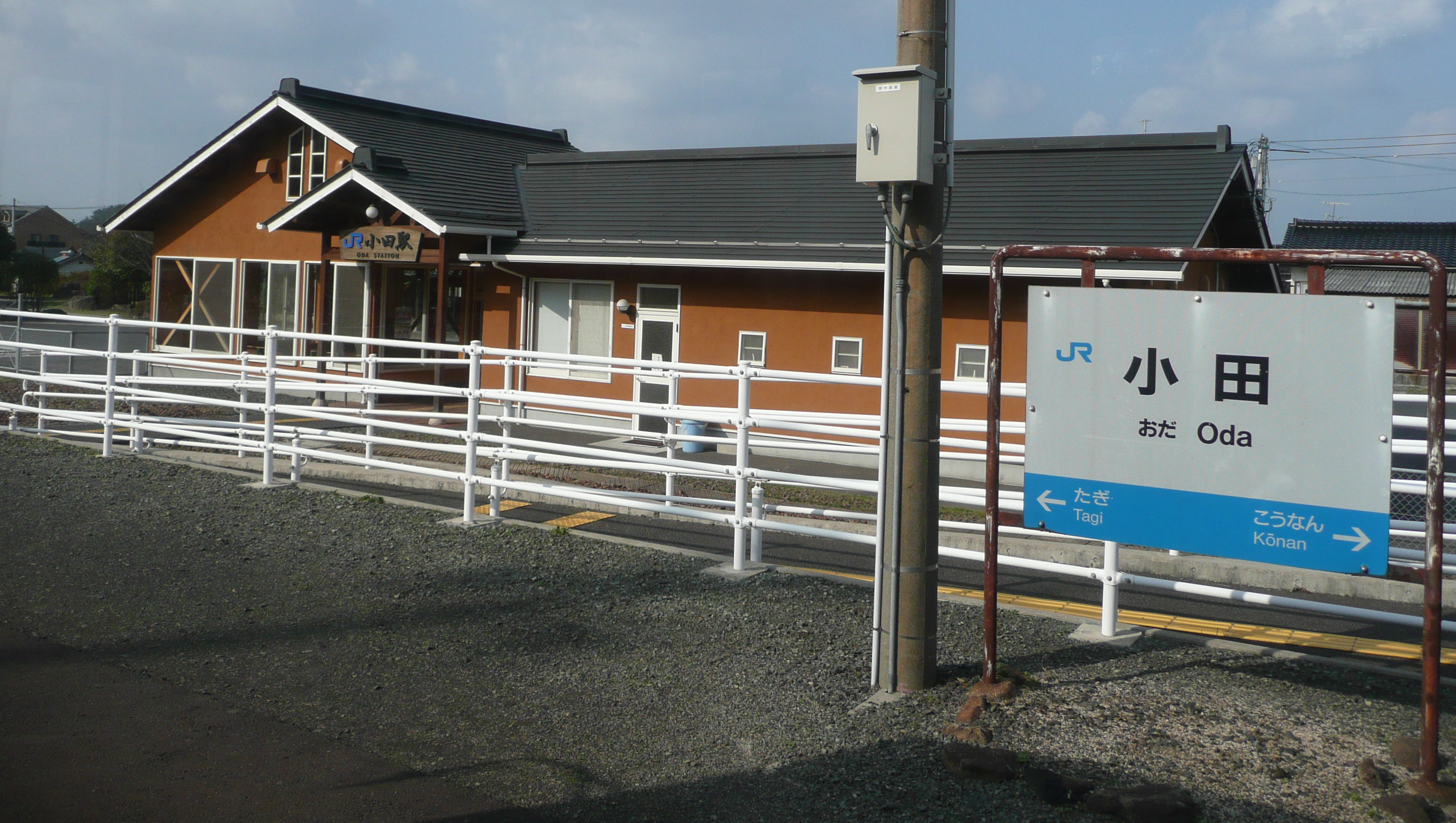
From the platform side, December 2010

== History ==
Oda Station was opened on 21 November 1913 when the San'in Main Line was extended from Izumo-Imaichi Station (currently Izumoshi Station). The line was further expended to Iwami Oda Station (currently Ōdashi Station) on 10 March 1915. With the privatization of the Japan National Railway (JNR) on 1 April 1987, the station came under the aegis of the West Japan Railway Company (JR West).

== Passenger statistics ==
In fiscal 2020, the station was used by an average of 63 passengers daily.

== Surrounding area ==
- I zumo City Hall Taki Administration Center
- Izumo City Taki Junior High School
- Izumo City Giku Elementary School
- Japan National Route 9

== See also ==
- List of railway stations in Japan
