= Izumoshi Station =

Railway station in Izumo, Shimane Prefecture, Japan

Izumoshi Station 出雲市駅
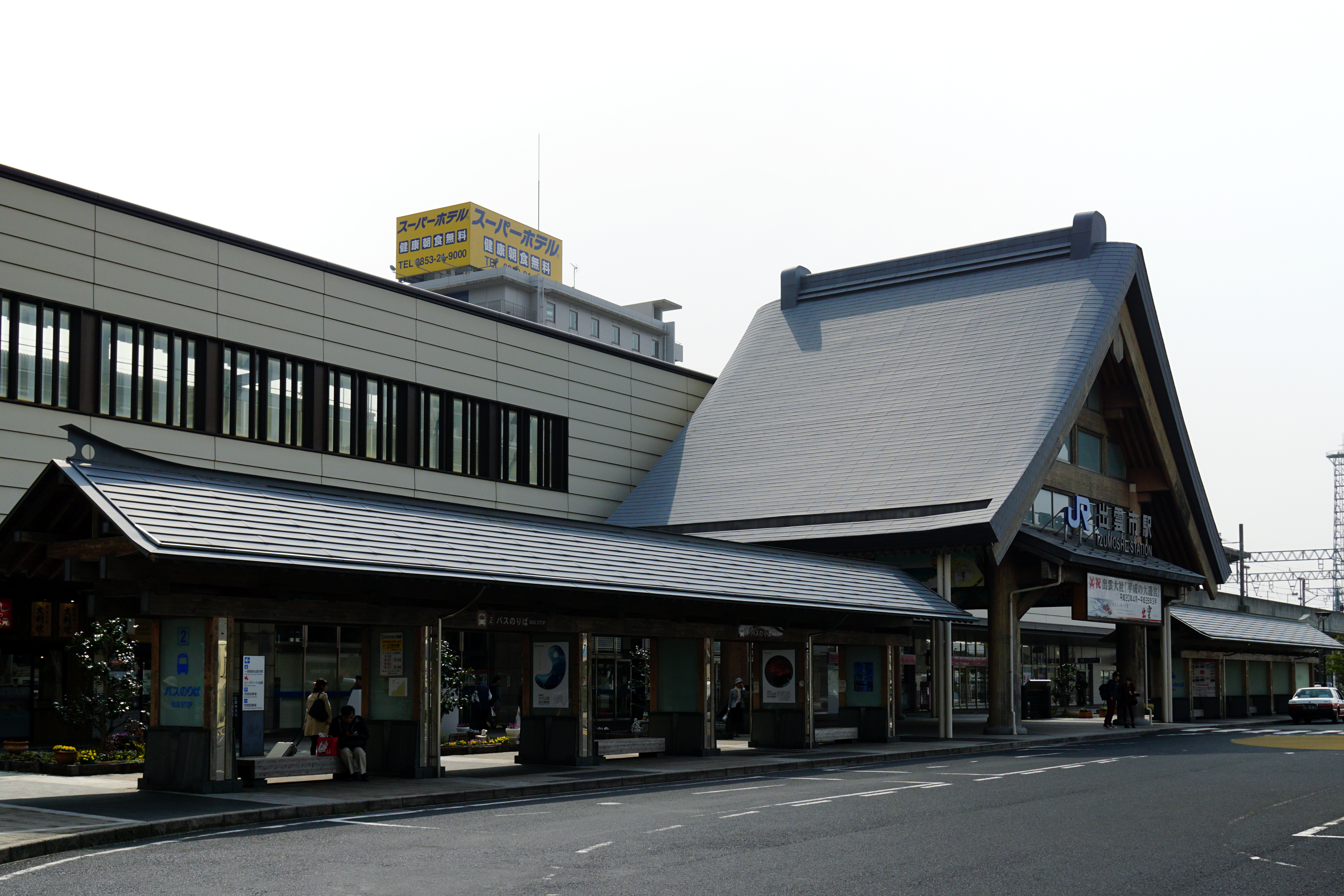
- Izumoshi Station, March 2015

General information
- Location: 11 Ekikitamachi, Izumoshi, Shimane-ken; Japan
- Coordinates: 35°21′38.51″N 132°45′23.46″E
- Owner: West Japan Railway Company
- Operator: West Japan Railway Company
- Line: D San'in Main Line
- Distance: 384.6 km (239.0 miles) from Kyoto
- Platforms: 2 island platforms
- Tracks: 4
- Connections: Bus stop

Construction
- Structure type: Elevated

Other information
- Status: Staffed
- Website: Official website

History
- Opened: 10 October 1910

Passengers
- FY 2020: 2518 daily (boarding only)

Services
Preceding station	JR West	Following station
Naoe towards Masuda	San'in Line Local	Nishi-Izumo towards Yonago
Location
- Location within Shimane Prefecture Location within Japan

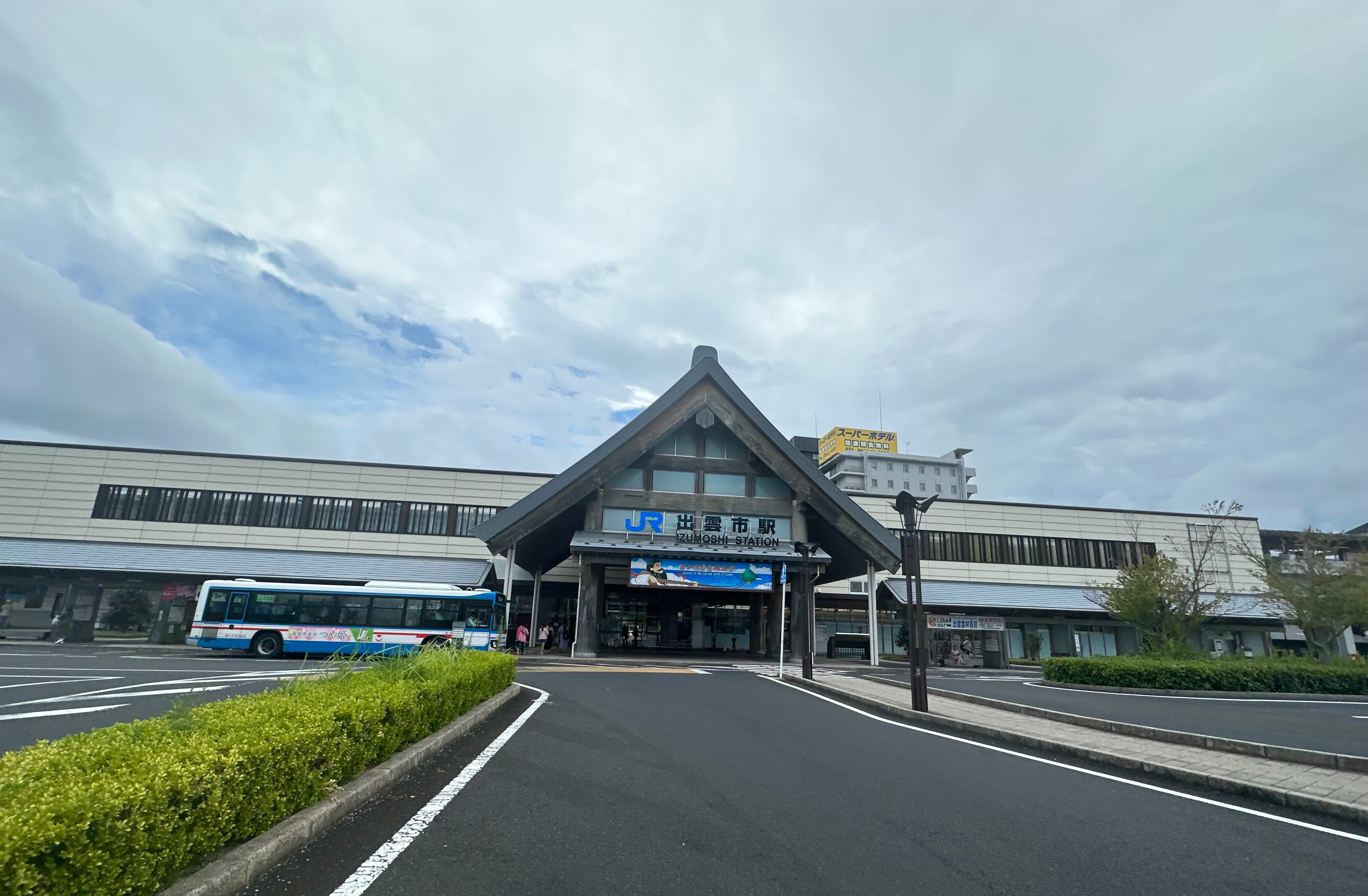
Front of the JR station building, 2023

Izumoshi Station (出雲市駅, Izumoshi-eki) is a passenger railway station located in the city of Izumo, Shimane Prefecture, Japan. It is operated by the West Japan Railway Company (JR West). Izumoshi Station is located 100 meters west of the Ichibata Electric Railway Dentetsu Izumoshi Station and there is no direct connection between buildings. Passengers wishing to change lines must exit the ticket gate to transfer between the two stations.

== Lines ==
Izumoshi Station is served by the JR West San'in Main Line, and is located 384.6 kilometers from the terminus of the line at Kyoto.

== Station layout ==
The station consists of two elevated island platforms with the station building underneath. The entry to the station has a doorway patterned after nearby Izumo-taisha. The station is staffed and contains a convenience store and a tourist information office.

== Platforms ==
1	■ D San'in Main Line	for Ōdashi and Hamada
2	■ D San'in Main Line	for Matsue, Tottori and Tottori
3	■ D San'in Main Line	for Ōdashi, Matsue and Tottori and Shin-Yamaguchi
4	■ D San'in Main Line	for Matsue and Hamada

== Gallery ==
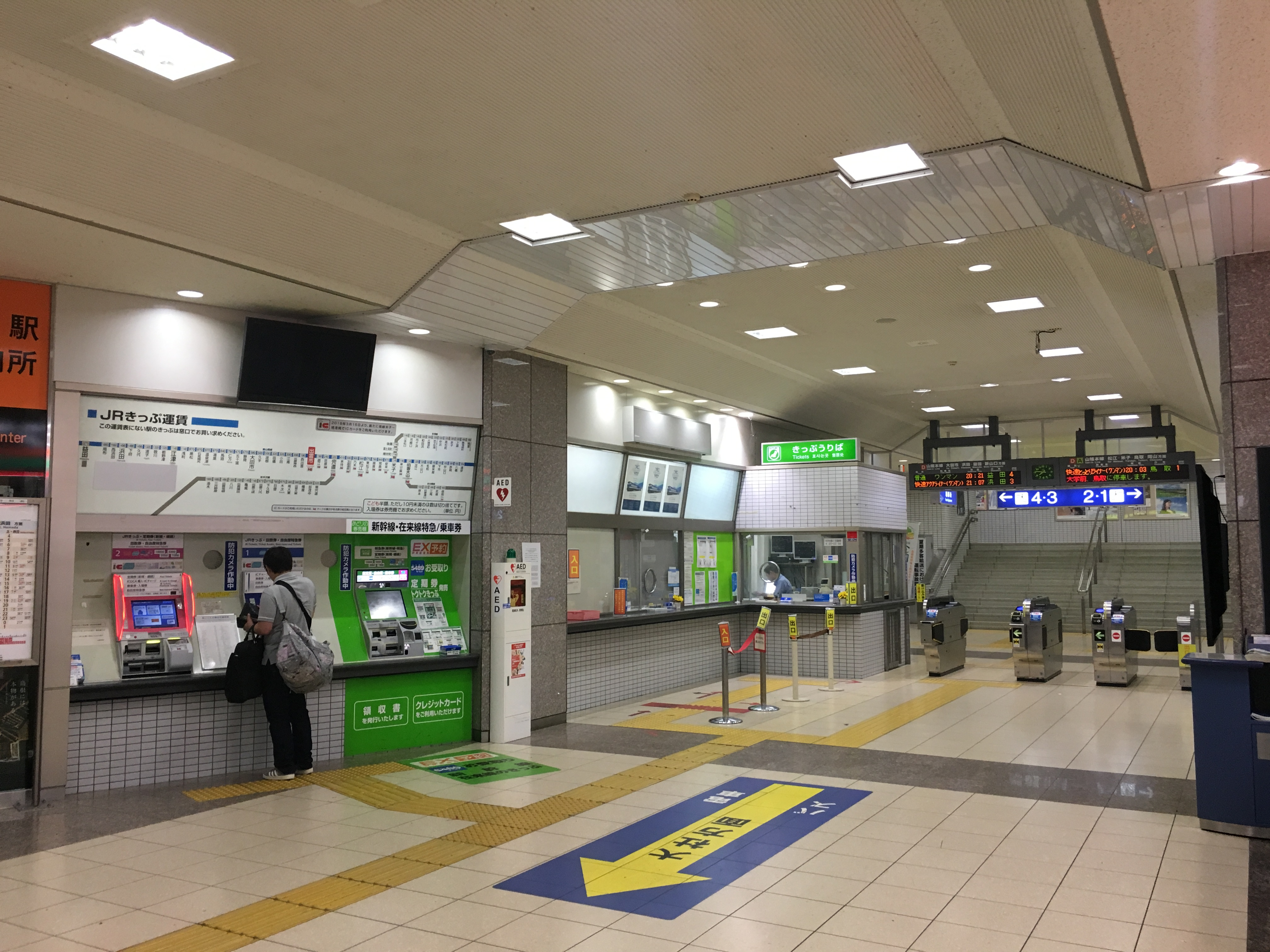
Station ticket gates, 2019

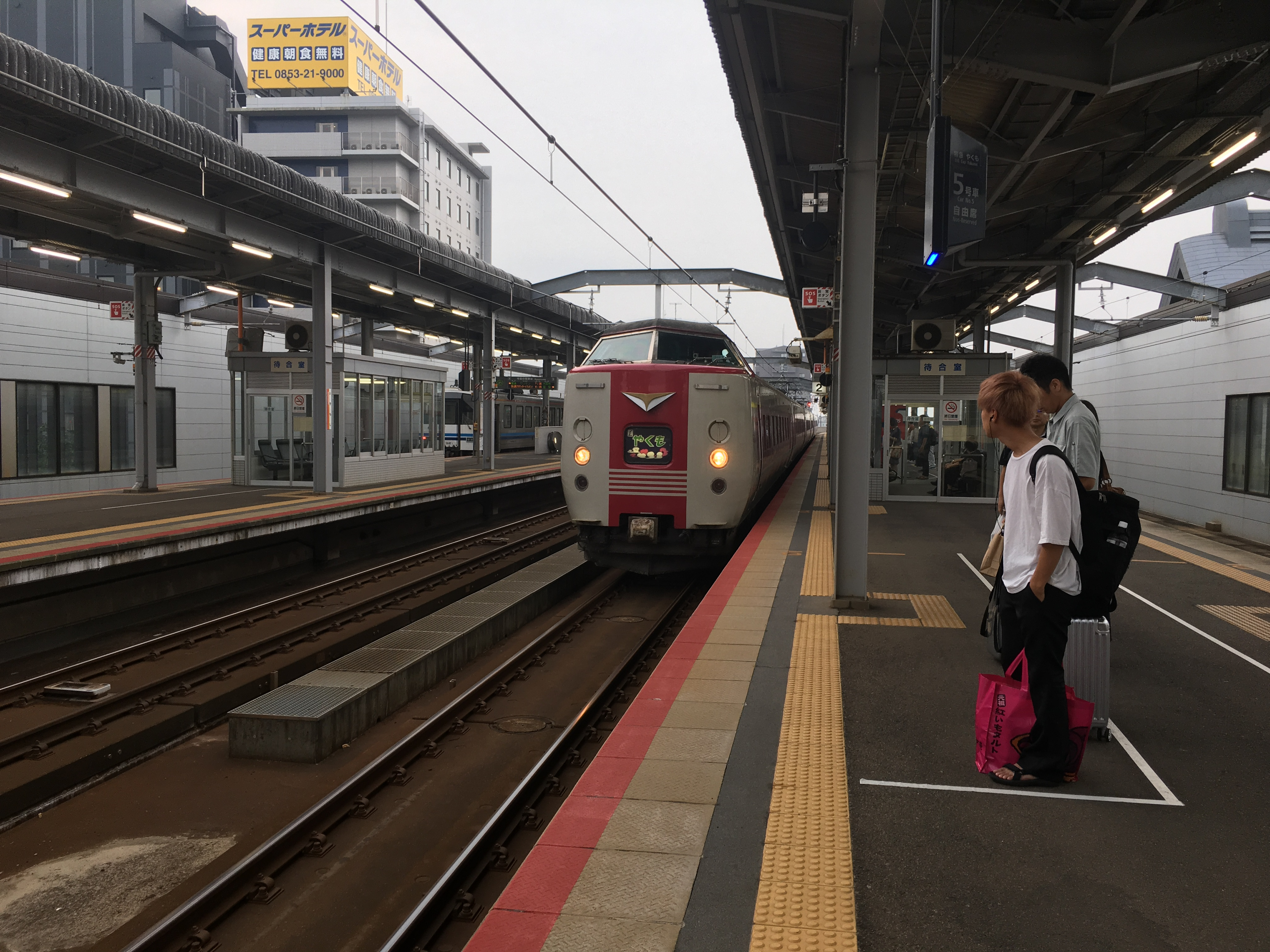
The elevated platforms, August 2019

== Adjacent stations ==
«	Service	»
JR West
Sanin Main Line
Shinji	Sleeper Limited Express Sunrise Izumo	Terminus
Shinji	Limited Express Yakumo	Terminus
Shinji	West Express Ginga	Terminus
Shinji	Limited Express Super Oki	Odashi
Shinji	Limited Express Super Matsukaze	Nishi-Izumo or Odashi
Naoe	Rapid Commuter Liner	Nishi-Izumo
Naoe	Rapid Aqua Liner	Nishi-Izumo
Naoe	Rapid Tottori Liner	Nishi-Izumo
Naoe	Local	Nishi-Izumo

== History ==
Izumoshi Station was opened as Izumo Imaichi Station (出雲今市駅) on 10 October 1910 when the San'in Main Line was extended from Shōbara Station. The Taisha Line began operations on 1 June 1912. The San'in Main Line was further expended to Oda on 21 November 1913. The station was renamed to its present name on 1 April 1957. With the privatization of the Japan National Railway (JNR) on 1 April 1987, the station came under the aegis of the West Japan Railway Company (JR West). The Taisha Line was discontinued in 1990.

== Passenger statistics ==
In fiscal 2019, the station was used by an average of 2,518 passengers daily.

== Surrounding area ==
- Dentetsu Izumoshi Station
- Izumo Municipal Hospital
- Izumo City Second Junior High School

== See also ==
- List of railway stations in Japan
