= Ōdashi Station =

Railway station in Ōda, Shimane Prefecture, Japan

Ōdashi Station 大田市駅
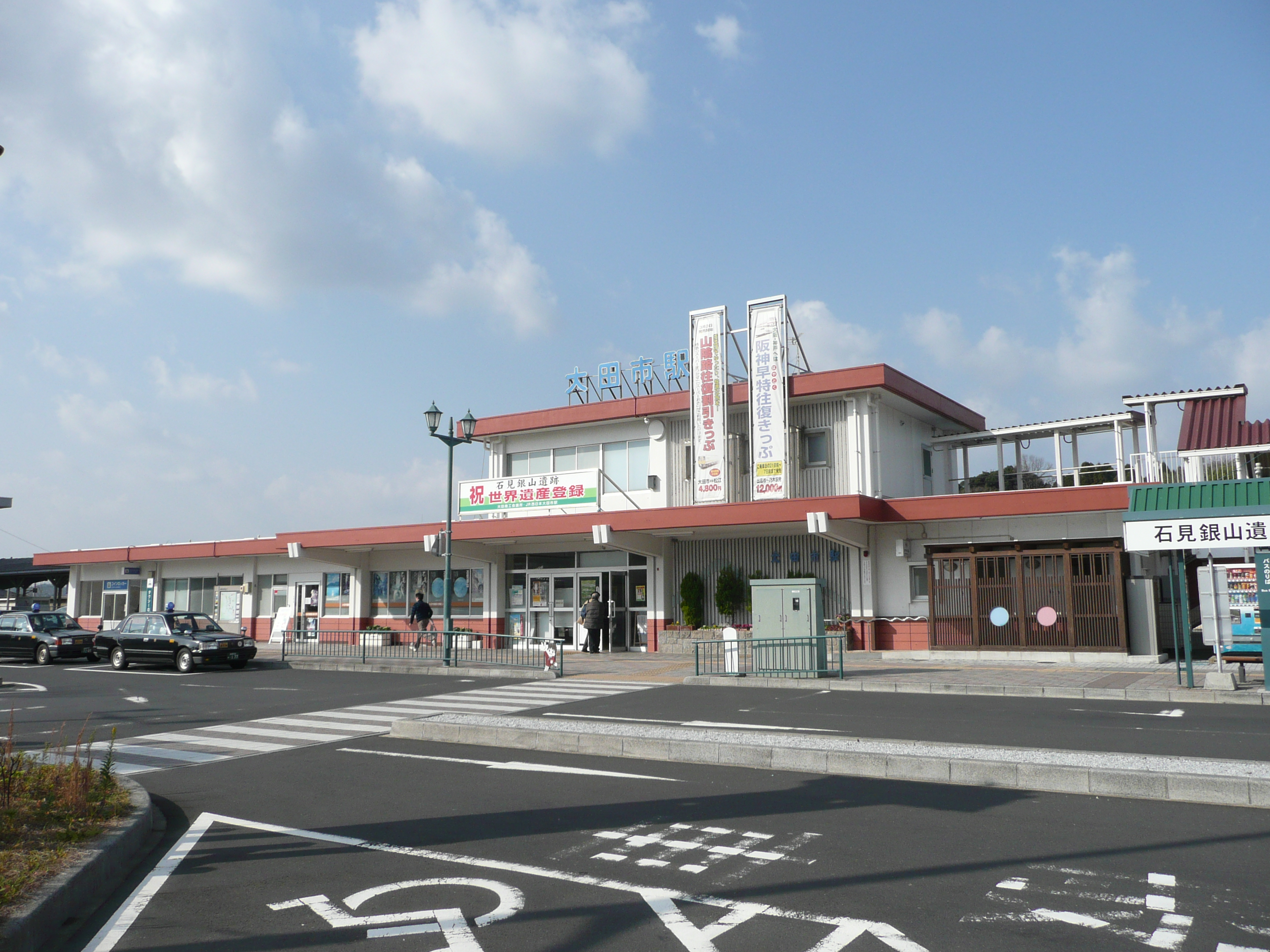
- Ōdashi Station in December 2010

General information
- Location: 665-2, Ōda-chō Ōda, Ōda-shi, Shimane-ken 699-2301; Japan
- Coordinates: 35°12′3.26″N 132°29′58.58″E
- Owner: West Japan Railway Company
- Operator: West Japan Railway Company
- Line: D San'in Main Line
- Distance: 417.2 km (259.2 miles) from Kyoto
- Platforms: 1 side + 1 island platform
- Tracks: 3

Construction
- Structure type: At grade

Other information
- Status: Unstaffed
- Website: Official website

History
- Opened: 11 July 1915
- Former names: Iwami-Ōda (until 1971)

Passengers
- FY2020: 363

Services
Preceding station	JR West	Following station
Shizuma towards Masuda	San'in Line	Kute towards Yonago
Location
- Location within Shimane Prefecture Location within Japan

Ōdashi Station (大田市駅, Ōdashi-eki) is a passenger railway station located in the city of Ōda, Shimane Prefecture, Japan. It is operated by the West Japan Railway Company (JR West).

== Lines ==
Ōdashi Station is served by the JR West San'in Main Line, and is located 417.2 kilometers from the terminus of the line at Kyoto.

== Station layout ==
The station consists of one side platform and one island platform connected to the station building by a footbridge crossing. The station is staffed.

== Platforms ==
1	■ D San'in Main Line	for Hamada and Masuda
2, 3	■ D San'in Main Line	for Izumoshi, and Matsue

== History ==
Ōdashi Station was opened on 11 July 1915 as Iwami-Ōda Station (石見大田駅) when the San'in Main Line was extended from Iwami-Ōda Station (currently Oda). The line was further extended to Nima Station on 15 May 1917. The station was renamed on 1 February 1971. With the privatization of the Japan National Railway (JNR) on 1 April 1987, the station came under the aegis of the West Japan railway Company (JR West).

== Passenger statistics ==
In fiscal 2020, the station was used by an average of 363 passengers daily.

== Bus terminal ==
=== Highway buses ===
- Iwami Ginzan; For Iwami Kawamoto Station, Hiroshima Bus Center, and Hiroshima Station

== Surrounding area ==
- Ōda City Hall
- Ōda Municipal Ōda Elementary School
- Ōda Municipal First Junior High School
- Shimane Prefectural Ōda High School
- Japan National Route 9

== See also ==
- List of railway stations in Japan
