= Maji Station =

Railway station in Ōda, Shimane Prefecture, Japan

Maji Station 馬路駅
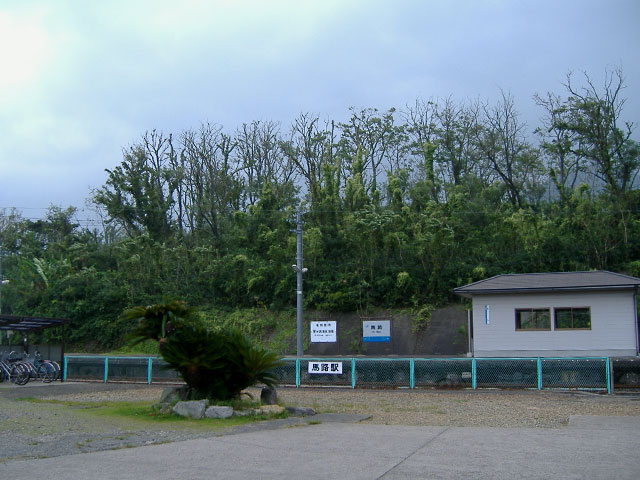
- Maji Station, September 2007

General information
- Location: 495 Nima-chō Maji, Ōda-shi, Shimane-ken 699-2304; Japan
- Coordinates: 35°7′40.93″N 132°23′14.69″E
- Owner: West Japan Railway Company
- Operator: West Japan Railway Company
- Line: D San'in Main Line
- Distance: 431.9 km (268.4 miles) from Kyoto
- Platforms: 1 island platform
- Tracks: 2

Construction
- Structure type: At grade

Other information
- Status: Unstaffed
- Website: Official website

History
- Opened: 25 November 1918

Passengers
- FY2020: 8

Services
Preceding station	JR West	Following station
Yusato towards Masuda	San'in Line	Nima towards Yonago
Location
- Location within Shimane Prefecture Location within Japan

Maji Station (馬路駅, Maji-eki) is a passenger railway station located in the city of Ōda, Shimane Prefecture, Japan. It is operated by the West Japan Railway Company (JR West).

== Lines ==
Maji Station is served by the JR West San'in Main Line, and is located 431.9 kilometers from the terminus of the line at Kyoto. Only local trains stop at this station.

== Station layout ==
The station consists of one island platform connected to the station building by a level crossing. The station is unattended.

== Platforms ==
1	■ D San'in Main Line	for Izumoshi, and Matsue
2	■ D San'in Main Line	for Hamada and Masuda

== History ==
Maji Station was opened on 25 November 1918 with the San'in Main Line was extended between Nima Station and Asari Station. With the privatization of the Japan National Railway (JNR) on 1 April 1987, the station came under the aegis of the West Japan railway Company (JR West). The station building was rebuilt in 2004.

== Passenger statistics ==
In fiscal 2020, the station was used by an average of 8 passengers daily.

== Surrounding area ==
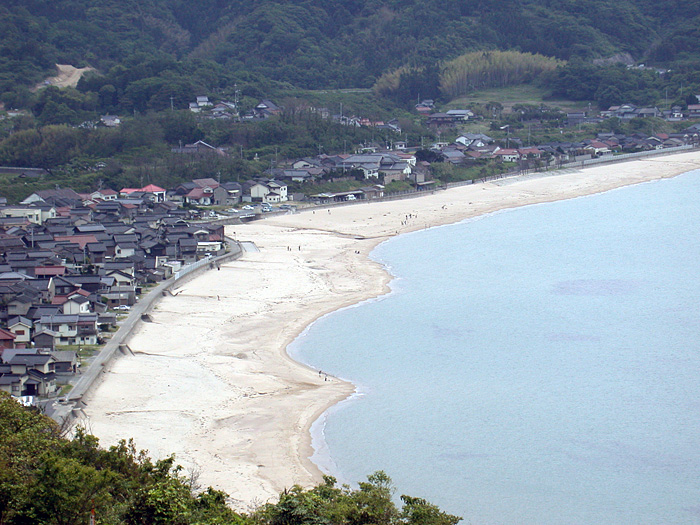
Kotogahama Beach

- Kotogahama Beach
- Iwami Ginzan Silver Mine port remains,
- Japan National Route 9

== See also ==
- List of railway stations in Japan
