= Yunotsu Station =

Railway station in Ōda, Shimane Prefecture, Japan

Yunotsu Station 温泉津駅
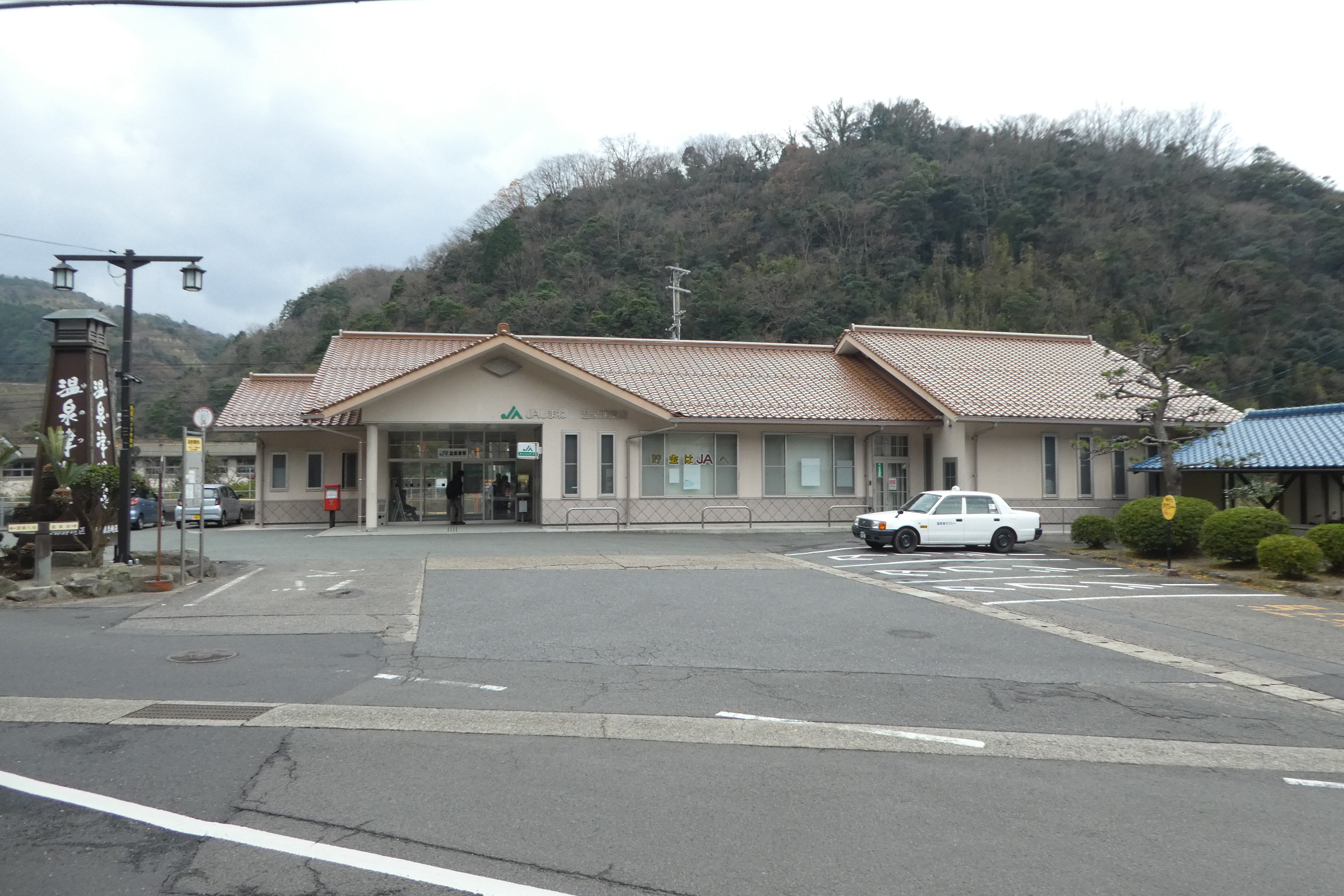
- Yunotsu Station in December 2017

General information
- Location: 44 Yunotsu-chō Kohama, Ōda-shi, Shimane-ken 699-2511; Japan
- Coordinates: 35°5′29.46″N 132°21′1.34″E
- Owner: West Japan Railway Company
- Operator: West Japan Railway Company
- Line: D San'in Main Line
- Distance: 437.9 km (272.1 miles) from Kyoto
- Platforms: 1 island platform
- Tracks: 2

Construction
- Structure type: At grade

Other information
- Status: Unstaffed
- Website: Official website

History
- Opened: 25 November 1918

Passengers
- FY2020: 35

Services
Preceding station	JR West	Following station
Iwami-Fukumitsu towards Masuda	San'in Line	Yusato towards Yonago
Location
- Location within Shimane Prefecture Location within Japan

Yunotsu Station (温泉津駅, Yunotsu-eki) is a passenger railway station located in the city of Ōda, Shimane Prefecture, Japan. It is operated by the West Japan Railway Company (JR West).

== Lines ==
Yunotsu Station is served by the JR West San'in Main Line, and is located 437.9 kilometers from the terminus of the line at Kyoto. Only local trains stop at this station.

== Station layout ==
The station consists of one island platform connected to the station building by a level crossing.

== Platforms ==
1	■ D San'in Main Line	for Izumoshi, and Matsue
2	■ D San'in Main Line	for Hamada and Masuda

== History ==
Yunotsu Station was opened on 25 November 1918 with the San'in Main Line was extended between Nima Station and Asari Station. With the privatization of the Japan National Railway (JNR) on 1 April 1987, the station came under the aegis of the West Japan railway Company (JR West). The station building was rebuilt in 2004.

== Passenger statistics ==
In fiscal 2020, the station was used by an average of 38 passengers daily.

== Surrounding area ==
- Yunotsu Onsen
- Oda City Hall Yunotsu Branch (former Yunotsu Town Hall)
- Yunotsu Pottery Village and Museum
- Obama Hot Spring
- Japan National Route 9

== See also ==
- List of railway stations in Japan
