= Kuromatsu Station (Shimane) =

Railway station in Gōtsu, Shimane Prefecture, Japan

Kuromatsu Station 黒松駅
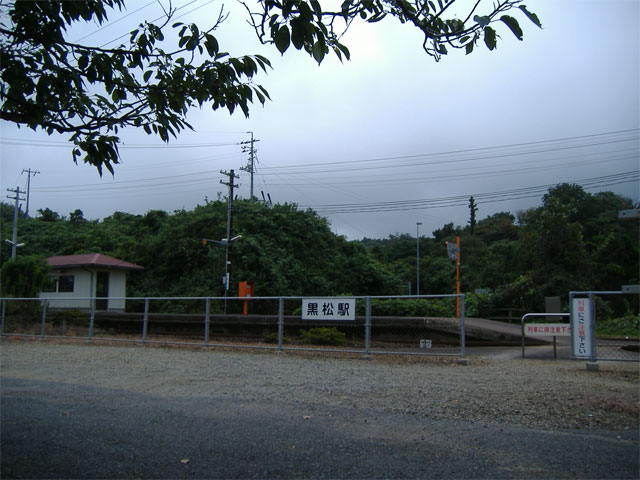
- Kuromatsu Station shown in 2007

General information
- Location: 355, Kuromatsu-chō, Gōtsu-shi, Shimane-ken 699-2831; Japan
- Coordinates: 35°3′23.36″N 132°18′47.60″E
- Owner: West Japan Railway Company
- Operator: West Japan Railway Company
- Line: D San'in Main Line
- Distance: 443.6 km (275.6 miles) from Kyoto
- Platforms: 1 island platform
- Tracks: 2

Construction
- Structure type: At grade

Other information
- Status: Unstaffed
- Website: Official website

History
- Opened: 25 November 1918

Passengers
- FY2020: 16

Services
Preceding station	JR West	Following station
Asari towards Masuda	San'in Line	Iwami-Fukumitsu towards Yonago
Location
- Location within Shimane Prefecture Location within Japan

Kuromatsu Station (黒松駅, Kuromatsu-eki) is a passenger railway station located in the city of Gōtsu, Shimane Prefecture, Japan. It is operated by the West Japan Railway Company (JR West).

== Lines ==
Kuromatsu Station is served by the JR West San'in Main Line, and is located 443.6 kilometers from the terminus of the line at Kyoto. Only local trains stop at this station.

== Station layout ==
The station consists of one island platform connected to the station building by a footbridge. The station is unattended.

== Platforms ==
1	■ D San'in Main Line	for Gōtsu and Ōdashi
2	■ D San'in Main Line	for Hamada and Masuda

== History ==
Kuromatsu Station was opened on 25 November 1918 when the San'in Main Line was extended from Asaki Station to Nima Station. With the privatization of the Japan National Railway (JNR) on 1 April 1987, the station came under the aegis of the West Japan railway Company (JR West).

== Passenger statistics ==
In fiscal 2020, the station was used by an average of 16 passengers daily.

== Surrounding area ==
- Kuromatsu Beach
- Japan National Route 9

== See also ==
- List of railway stations in Japan
