= Haifukiho =

Silver smelting method

Haifuki-ho (灰吹法; literally "ash-blowing method"), also known as Lead-silver separation method (Korean: 연은분리법; Hanja: 鉛銀分離法), is a method of silver mining developed in Joseon dynasty of Korea in the 16th century and spread to China and Feudal Japan. The industrial process involved cupellation, and was a contributing factor to the large amount of silver traditionally exported by Japan.

== History ==
In 1526 Kamiya Jutei, a wealthy merchant from Hakata, founded the Iwami Ginzan Silver Mine in Ōda. Seeking to increase silver production, In 1533 he introduced a Korean method of silver refining to the mine which became the Hai-Fuki-Ho method. The two technicians, Keiju (慶寿; Korean: 경수; Revised Romanization: Gyeongsu) and Sotan (宗丹; Korean: 종단; Revised Romanization: Jongdan), were invited to Japan to instruct their skills. Historians have compared the Hai-Fuki-Ho method to the Medieval European seigerprozess method of silver smelting.

Under the Hai-Fuki-Ho method, silver-containing copper ore would be cast-smelted with lead, then allowed to dry. The silver in the copper ore would bind to the lead, creating a single mixture. This mixture would then be heated so that the lead melted and separated out of the copper, taking the bonded silver with it. The silver-rich lead would then be treated with an oxidizing airflow to separate the silver. This was akin to a liquation method.

The high-purity silver produced by the Hai-Fuki-Ho method was highly desired by foreign merchants. In addition, the process allowed for greater amounts of the silver to be produced by Japanese mines, which had more efficient refining processes than their competitors. By the 16th century, Japanese mines were producing up to one third of the world's silver.

The Hai-Fuki-Ho method was eventually replaced by more modern methods of silver mining.
