= Isotake Station =

Railway station in Ōda, Shimane Prefecture, Japan

Isotake Station 五十猛駅
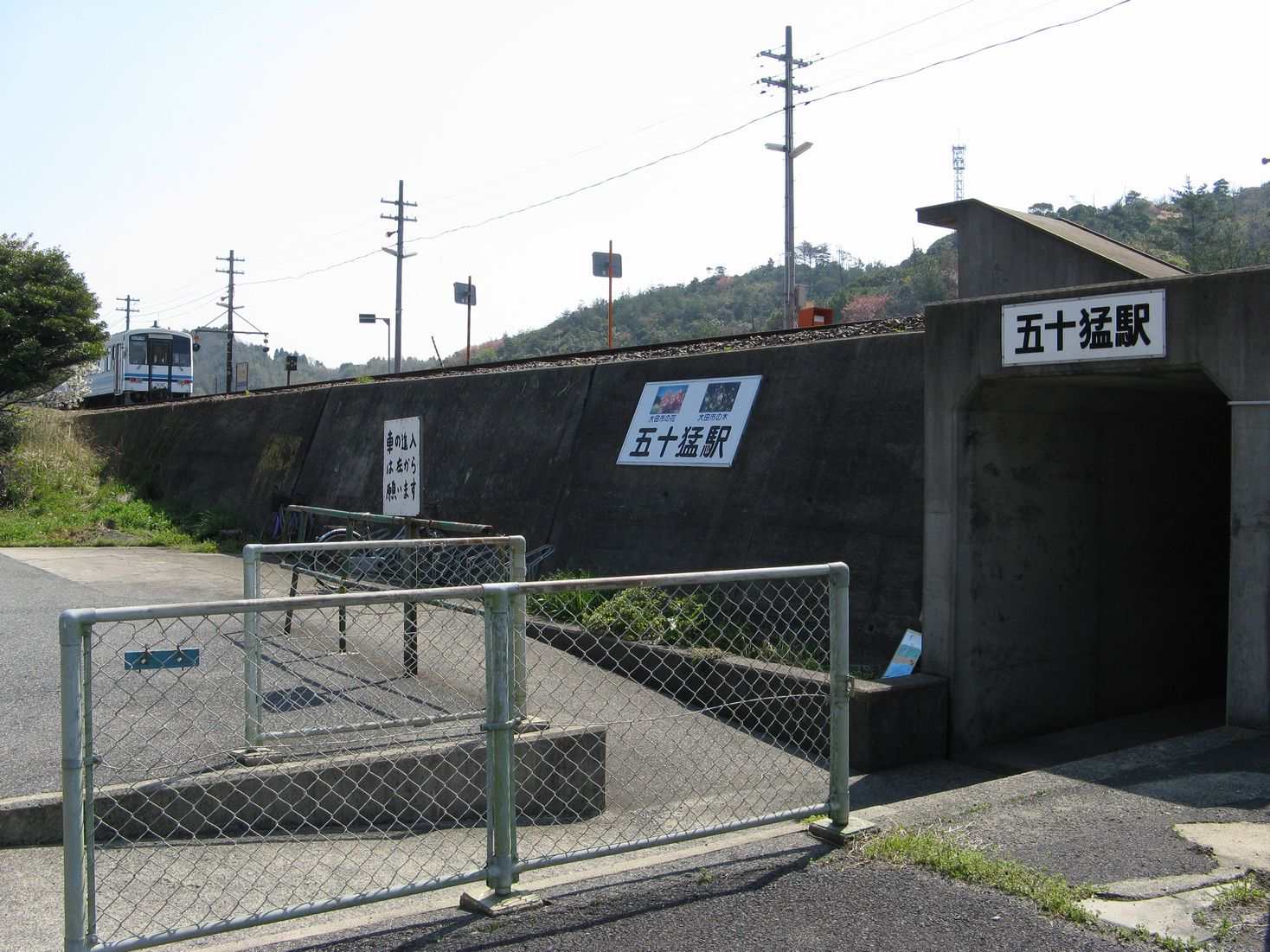
- Isotake Station in April 2009

General information
- Location: 240, Isotake-chō, Ōda-shi, Shimane-ken 694-0035; Japan
- Coordinates: 35°11′34.43″N 132°26′27.20″E
- Owner: West Japan Railway Company
- Operator: West Japan Railway Company
- Line: D San'in Main Line
- Distance: 422.8 km (262.7 miles) from Kyoto
- Platforms: 1 island platform
- Tracks: 2

Other information
- Status: Unstaffed
- Website: Official website

History
- Opened: 15 May 1917

Passengers
- FY2020: 10

Services
Preceding station	JR West	Following station
Nima towards Masuda	San'in Line	Shizuma towards Yonago
Location
- Location within Shimane Prefecture Location within Japan

Isotake Station (五十猛駅, Isotake-eki) is a passenger railway station located in the city of Ōda, Shimane Prefecture, Japan. It is operated by the West Japan Railway Company (JR West).

== Lines ==
Isotake Station is served by the JR West San'in Main Line, and is located 422.8 kilometers from the terminus of the line at Kyoto.

== Station layout ==
The station consists of one island platform on an embankment. There is no station building, but only a small weather shelter on the platform itself. The station is unattended.

== Platforms ==
1	■ D San'in Main Line	for Izumoshi, and Matsue
2	■ D San'in Main Line	for Hamada and Masuda

== History ==
Isotake Station was opened on 15 May 1917 when the San'in Main Line was extended from Iwami-Ōda Station (currently Ōdashi Station). The line was further extended to Asari Station on 25 November 1918. With the privatization of the Japan National Railway (JNR) on 1 April 1987, the station came under the aegis of the West Japan railway Company (JR West).

== Passenger statistics ==
In fiscal 2020, the station was used by an average of 10 passengers daily.

== Surrounding area ==
Most of the surroundings are private houses and there are no shops.

- Japan National Route 9

== See also ==
- List of railway stations in Japan
