= Iwami-Fukumitsu Station =

Railway station in Ōda, Shimane Prefecture, Japan

Iwami-Fukumitsu Station 石見福光駅
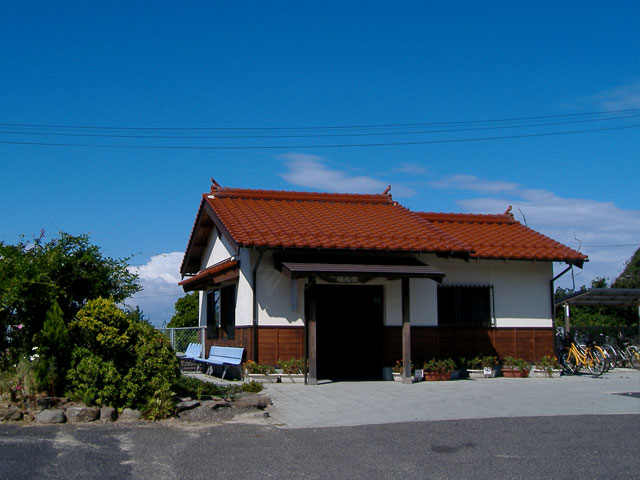
- Iwami-Fukumitsu Station, October 2007

General information
- Location: 1718 Yunotsu-chō Fukumitsu, Ōda-shi, Shimane-ken 699-2514; Japan
- Coordinates: 35°4′35.34″N 132°19′44.65″E
- Owner: West Japan Railway Company
- Operator: West Japan Railway Company
- Line: D San'in Main Line
- Distance: 440.8 km (273.9 miles) from Kyoto
- Platforms: 1 side platform
- Tracks: 1

Construction
- Structure type: At grade

Other information
- Status: Unstaffed
- Website: Official website

History
- Opened: 25 October 1928

Passengers
- FY2020: 13

Services
Preceding station	JR West	Following station
Kuromatsu towards Masuda	San'in Line	Yunotsu towards Yonago
Location
- Location within Shimane Prefecture Location within Japan

Iwami-Fukumitsu Station (石見福光駅, Iwami-Fukumitsu-eki) is a passenger railway station located in the city of Ōda, Shimane Prefecture, Japan. It is operated by the West Japan Railway Company (JR West).

== Lines ==
Iwami-Fukumitsu Station is served by the JR West San'in Main Line, and is located 440.8 kilometers from the terminus of the line at Kyoto. Only local trains stop at this station.

== Station layout ==
The station consists of one side platform serving a single bi-directional track. The station originally had opposed side platforms, but one of the platforms and track has been removed. The station building has no facilities, and serves more as a waiting room.

== History ==
Iwami-Fukumitsu Station was opened on 25 October 1928. With the privatization of the Japan National Railway (JNR) on 1 April 1987, the station came under the aegis of the West Japan railway Company (JR West).

== Passenger statistics ==
In fiscal 2020, the station was used by an average of 13 passengers daily.

== Surrounding area ==
- Ota Municipal Yunotsu Elementary School
- Fukumitsu Beach
- Japan National Route 9

== See also ==
- List of railway stations in Japan
