= Nima District, Shimane =

Former district in Shimane prefecture, Japan

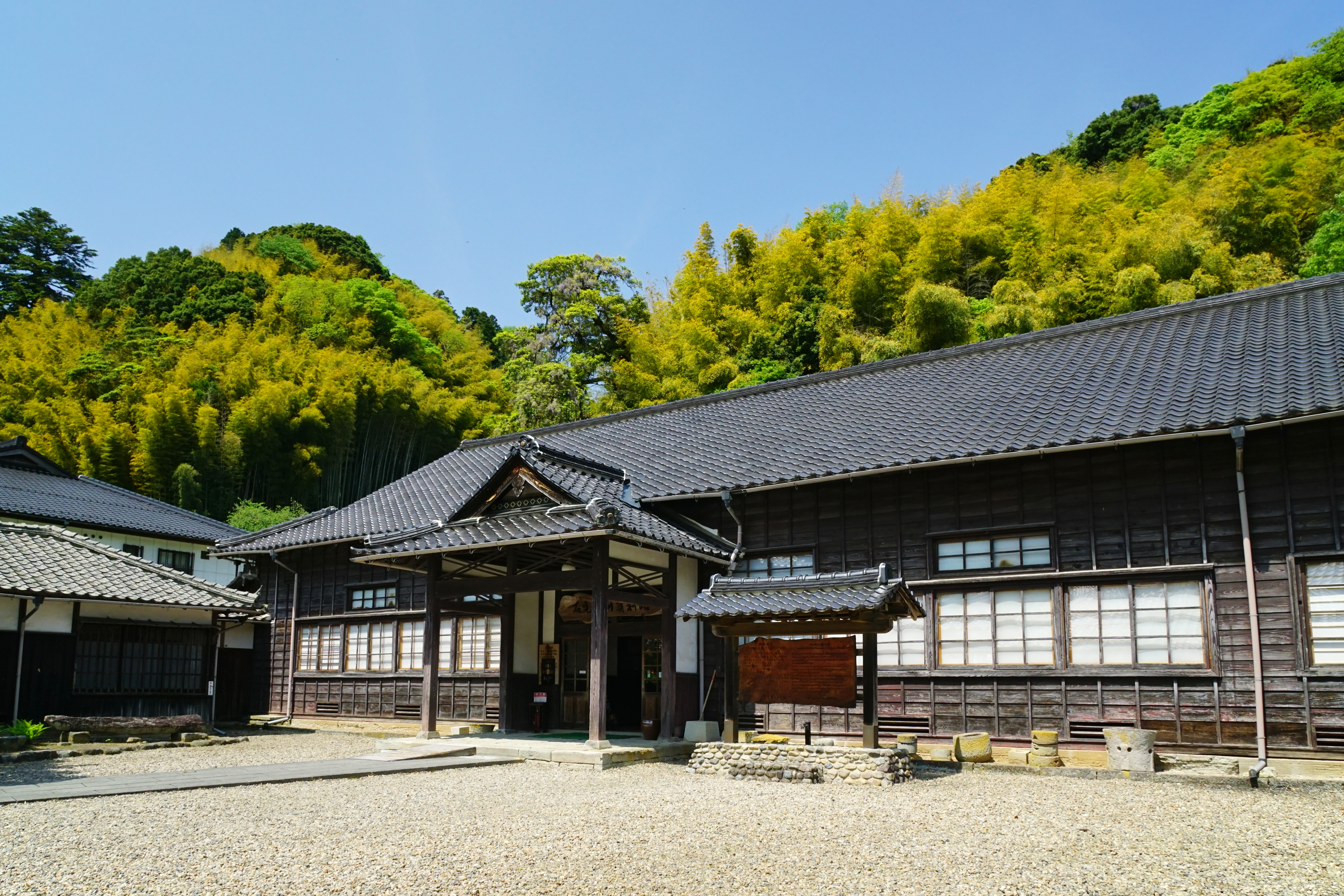
Old County office

Nima (邇摩郡, Nima-gun) was a district located in Shimane Prefecture, Japan.

As of 2003, the district had an estimated population of 8,682 and a density of 83.93 persons per km^{2}. The total area was 103.44 km^{2}.

== Former towns and villages ==
- Nima
- Yunotsu

== Merger ==
- On October 1, 2005 - the towns of Nima and Yunotsu was merged into the expanded city of Ōda. Nima District was dissolved as a result of this merger.
