= Shizuma Station =

Railway station in Ōda, Shimane Prefecture, Japan

Shizuma Station 静間駅
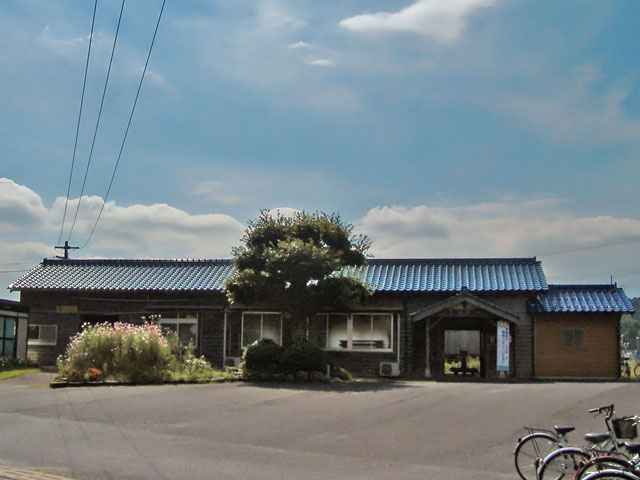
- Shizuma Station in September 2007

General information
- Location: 1718, Yunotsu-chō Fukumitsu, Ōda-shi, Shimane-ken 694-0031; Japan
- Coordinates: 35°11′43.74″N 132°28′5.00″E
- Owner: West Japan Railway Company
- Operator: West Japan Railway Company
- Line: D San'in Main Line
- Distance: 420.2 km (261.1 miles) from Kyoto
- Platforms: 1 side platform
- Tracks: 1

Construction
- Structure type: At grade

Other information
- Status: Unstaffed
- Website: Official website

History
- Opened: 16 September 1926

Passengers
- FY2020: 30

Services
Preceding station	JR West	Following station
Isotake towards Masuda	San'in Line	Ōdashi towards Yonago
Location
- Location within Shimane Prefecture Location within Japan

Shizuma Station (静間駅, Shizuma-eki) is a passenger railway station located in the city of Ōda, Shimane Prefecture, Japan. It is operated by the West Japan Railway Company (JR West).

== Lines ==
Shizuma Station is served by the JR West San'in Main Line, and is located 420.2 kilometers from the terminus of the line at Kyoto.

== Station layout ==
The station consists of one side platform serving a single bi-directional track. On the opposite side of the roadbed is the remains of an island platform that was used until March 2001. While the station building bookstore is made of wood, the restroom, which is connected to the waiting room by a single door, was recently added. In April 2000, the former station office in the eastern half of the bookstore was remodeled as the 'Shizuma Station Kaikan', which is used as a community center.

== History ==
Shizuma Station was opened on 16 September 1926. With the privatization of the Japan National Railway (JNR) on 1 April 1987, the station came under the aegis of the West Japan railway Company (JR West).

== Passenger statistics ==
In fiscal 2020, the station was used by an average of 30 passengers daily.

== Surrounding area ==
- Ōda Municipal Shizuma Elementary School
- Uozu Beach
- Shizuka Cave
- Japan National Route 9

== See also ==
- List of railway stations in Japan
