= Nima, Shimane =

Town in Shimane Prefecture, Japan

Nima (仁摩町, Nima-chō) was a town located in Nima District, Shimane Prefecture, Japan.

As of 2003, the town had an estimated population of 4,829 and a density of 152.86 persons per km^{2}. The total area was 31.59 km^{2}.

On October 1, 2005, Nima, along with the town of Yunotsu (also from Nima District), was merged into the expanded city of Ōda.

The Nima Sand Museum is a major attraction.
