= Yunotsu, Shimane =

Dissolved municipality in Shimane prefecture, Japan

Coordinates: 35.08333°N 132.35°E

Yunotsu (温泉津町, Yunotsu-machi) was a coastal town located in Nima District, Shimane Prefecture, Japan.

As of 2003, the town had an estimated population of 3,853 and a density of 53.63 persons per km^{2}. The total area was 71.85 km^{2}

On October 1, 2005, Yunotsu, along with the town of Nima (also from Nima District), was merged into the expanded city of Ōda.

== See also ==
- Groups of Traditional Buildings
