= Yusato Station =

Railway station in Ōda, Shimane Prefecture, Japan

Yusato Station 湯里駅
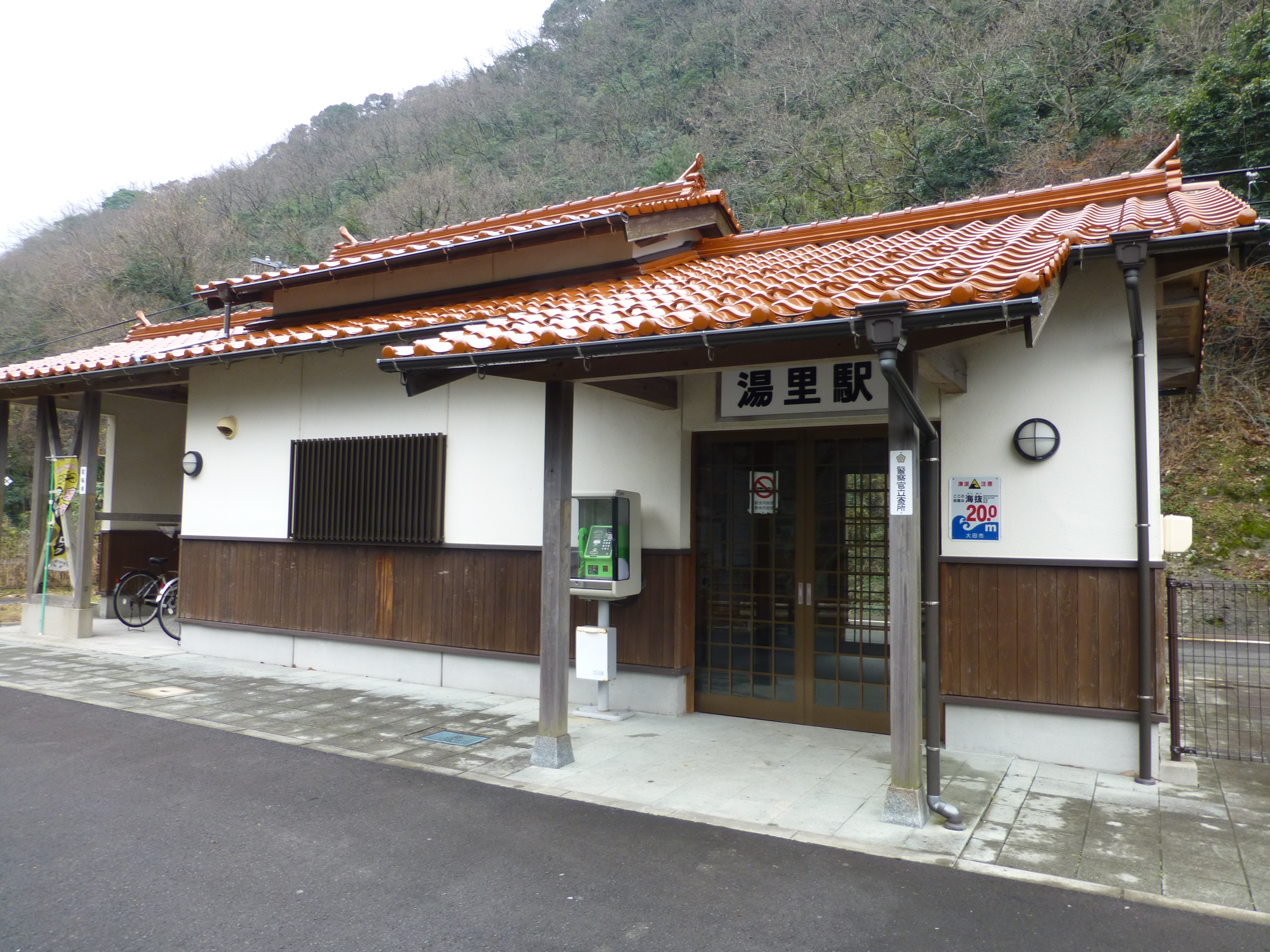
- Yusato Station, 2015

General information
- Location: 1303, Yunotsu-chō Yuzato, Ōda-shi, Shimane-ken 699-2502; Japan
- Coordinates: 35°6′23.37″N 132°22′31.97″E
- Owner: West Japan Railway Company
- Operator: West Japan Railway Company
- Line: D San'in Main Line
- Distance: 434.8 km (270.2 miles) from Kyoto
- Platforms: 1 side platform
- Tracks: 1

Construction
- Structure type: At grade

Other information
- Status: Unstaffed
- Website: Official website

History
- Opened: 1 May 1935

Passengers
- FY2020: 5

Services
Preceding station	JR West	Following station
Yunotsu towards Masuda	San'in Line	Maji towards Yonago
Location
- Location within Shimane Prefecture Location within Japan

Yusato Station (湯里駅, Yusato-eki) is a passenger railway station located in the city of Ōda, Shimane Prefecture, Japan. It is operated by the West Japan Railway Company (JR West).

== Lines ==
Yusato Station is served by the JR West San'in Main Line, and is located 434.8 kilometers from the terminus of the line at Kyoto. Only local trains stop at this station.

== Station layout ==
The station consists of one side platform serving a single bi-directional track. The station building is unattended.

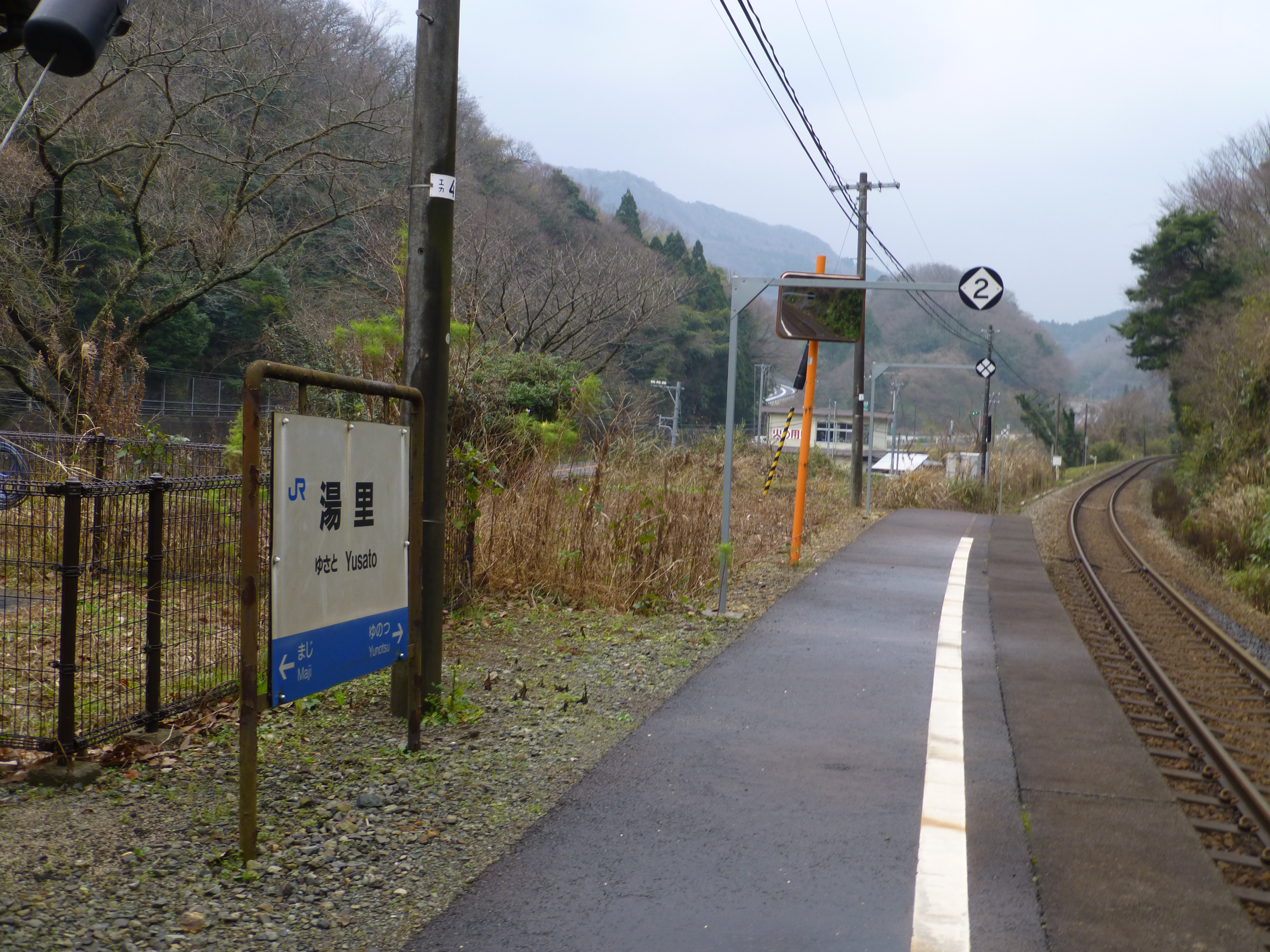
Station platform, 2015

== History ==
Yusato Station was opened on 1 May 1935. With the privatization of the Japan National Railway (JNR) on 1 April 1987, the station came under the aegis of the West Japan railway Company (JR West).

== Passenger statistics ==
In fiscal 2020, the station was used by an average of 5 passengers daily.

== Surrounding area ==
- Yusato Town Development Center (former Ota Municipal Yusato Elementary School)
- Japan National Route 9

== See also ==
- List of railway stations in Japan
