= Nima Station =

Railway station in Ōda, Shimane Prefecture, Japan

Nima Station 仁万駅
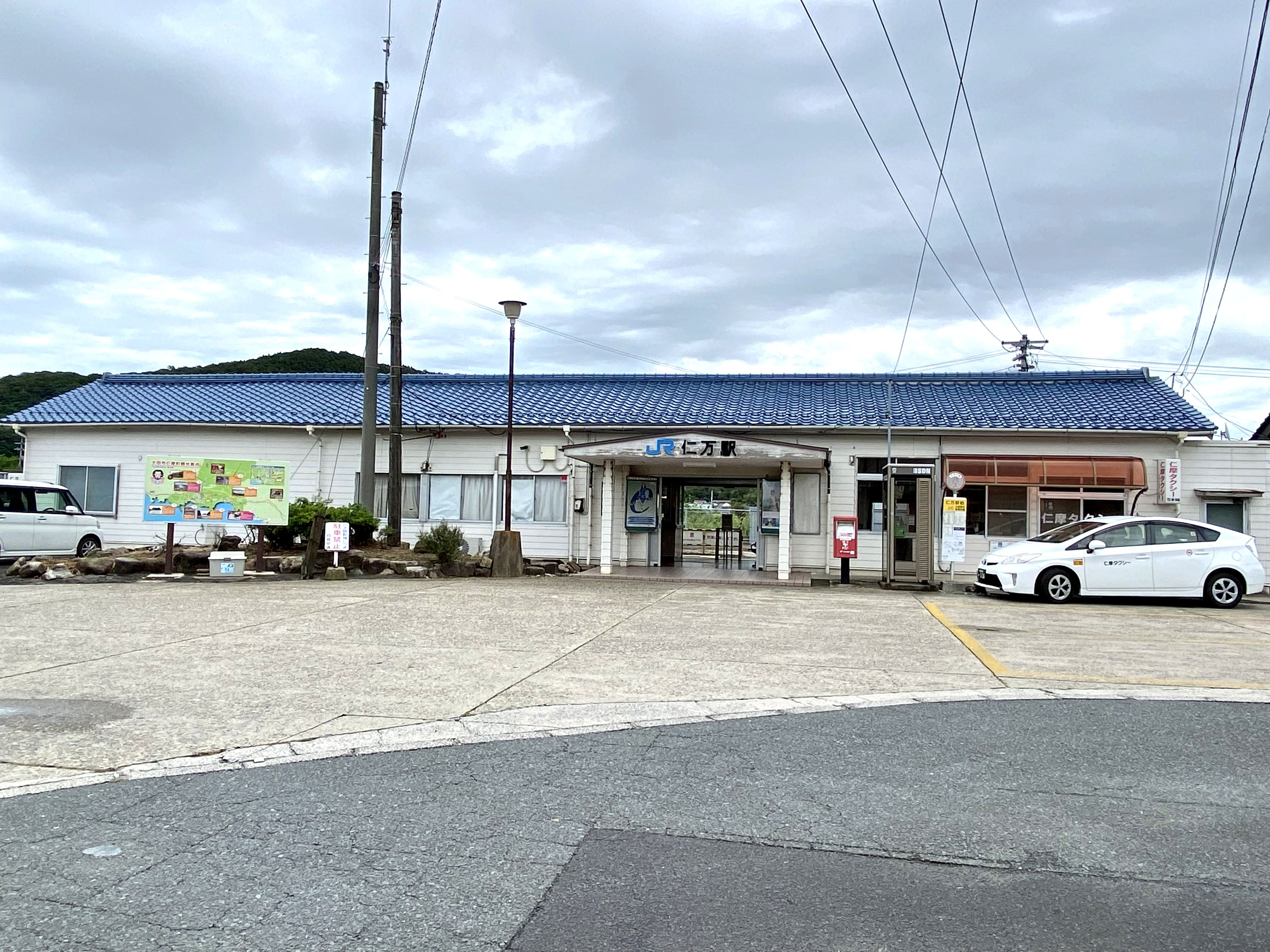
- Nima Station in August 2021

General information
- Location: 516, Nima-chō Nima, Ōda-shi, Shimane-ken 699-2301; Japan
- Coordinates: 35°9′2.58″N 132°24′12.04″E
- Owner: West Japan Railway Company
- Operator: West Japan Railway Company
- Line: D San'in Main Line
- Distance: 428.9 km (266.5 miles) from Kyoto
- Platforms: 1 island platform
- Tracks: 2

Construction
- Structure type: At grade

Other information
- Status: Unstaffed
- Website: Official website

History
- Opened: 15 May 1917

Passengers
- FY2020: 251

Services
| Preceding station | JR West | Following station |
|---|---|---|
| Maji towards Masuda | San'in Line | Isotake towards Yonago |
Location
- Location within Shimane Prefecture Location within Japan

Nima Station (仁万駅, Nima-eki) is a passenger railway station located in the city of Ōda, Shimane Prefecture, Japan. It is operated by the West Japan Railway Company (JR West).

== Lines ==
Nima Station is served by the JR West San'in Main Line, and is located 428.9 kilometers from the terminus of the line at Kyoto.

== Station layout ==
The station consists of one island platform connected to the station building by a level crossing. The station is unattended.

== Platforms ==
| 1 | ■ D San'in Main Line | for Izumoshi, and Matsue |
| 2 | ■ D San'in Main Line | for Hamada and Masuda |

== History ==
Nima Station was opened on 15 May 1917 when the San'in Main Line was extended from Iwami-Ōda Station (currently Ōdashi Station). The line was further extended to Asari Station on 25 November 1918. With the privatization of the Japan National Railway (JNR) on 1 April 1987, the station came under the aegis of the West Japan railway Company (JR West).

== Passenger statistics ==
In fiscal 2020, the station was used by an average of 251 passengers daily.

== Surrounding area ==
- Shimane Prefectural Nima High School
- Ōda Municipal Ōda Nishi Junior High School
- Ōda Municipal Nima Elementary School

Nima Sand Museum (Famous as Nima of "singing sand" (squeaking sound when walking on sandy beach))

- Ōda City Hall Nima Branch (former Nima Town Hall)
- Japan National Route 9

== See also ==
- List of railway stations in Japan
