= Ōda, Shimane =

Ōda 大田市
- City
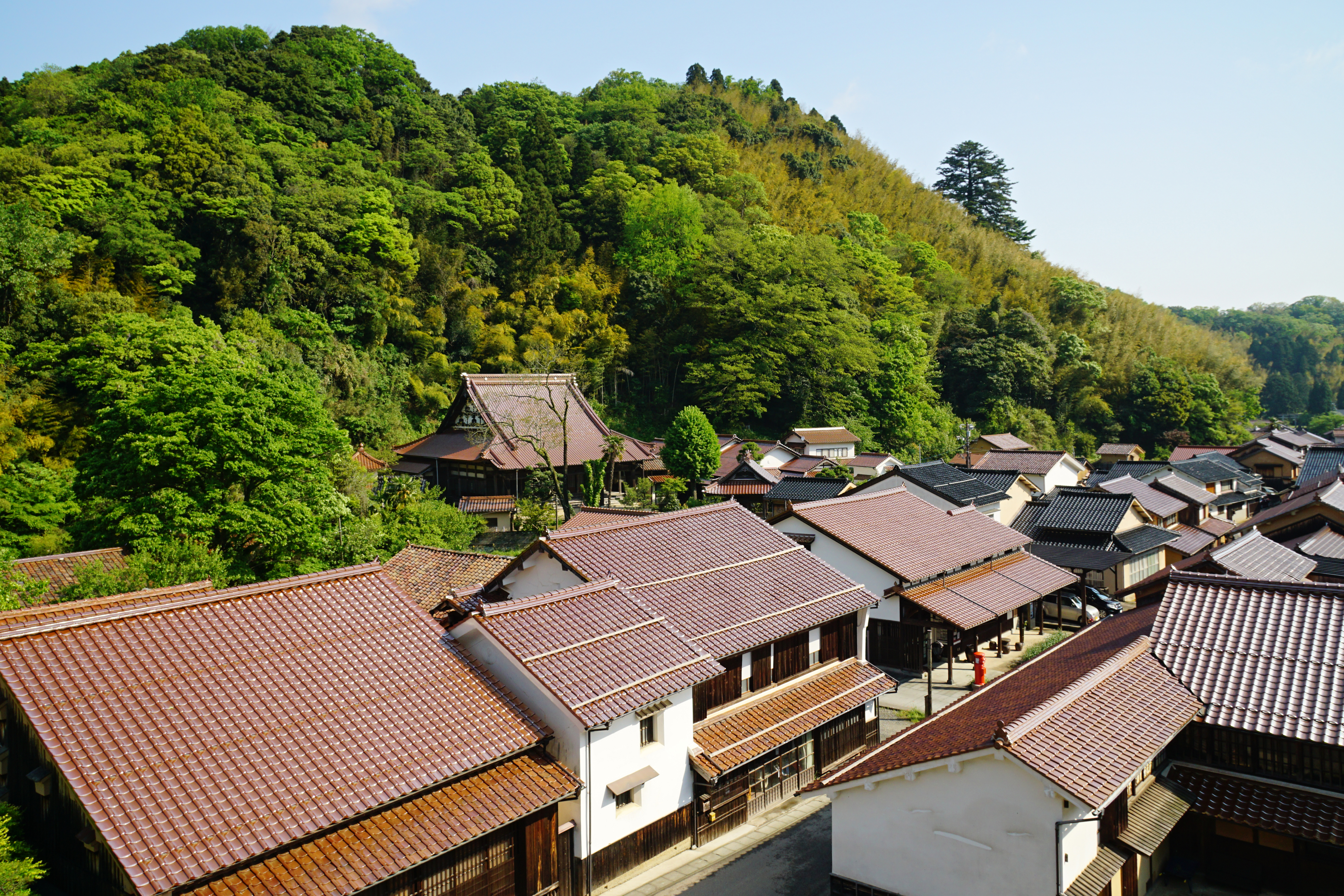
- Ōmori Ginzan

- Flag Seal
- Location of Ōda in Shimane Prefecture

- Location in Japan
- Coordinates: 35°11′31″N 132°29′58″E
- Country: Japan
- Region: Chūgoku (San'in)
- Prefecture: Shimane

Government
  - Mayor: Soichi Takegoshi (since 2005)

Area
  - Total: 435.71 km^{2} (168.23 sq mi)

Population (1 December 2022)
  - Total: 32,838
  - Density: 75.367/km^{2} (195.20/sq mi)
- Time zone: UTC+09:00 (JST)
- City hall address: 1111 Ōdaguchi, Ōda-machi, Ōda-shi, Shimane-ken 694-0064
- Climate: Cfa
- Website: Official website
- Symbols
- Flower: Phododendron molle
- Tree: Prunus mume

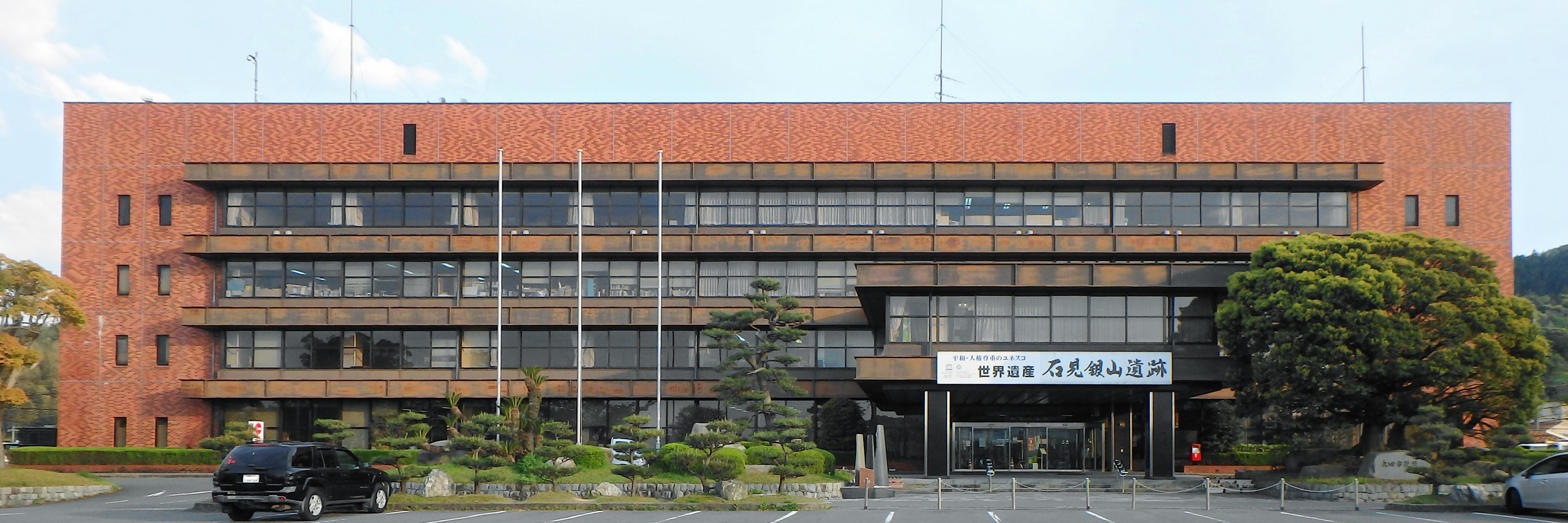
Ōda City Hall

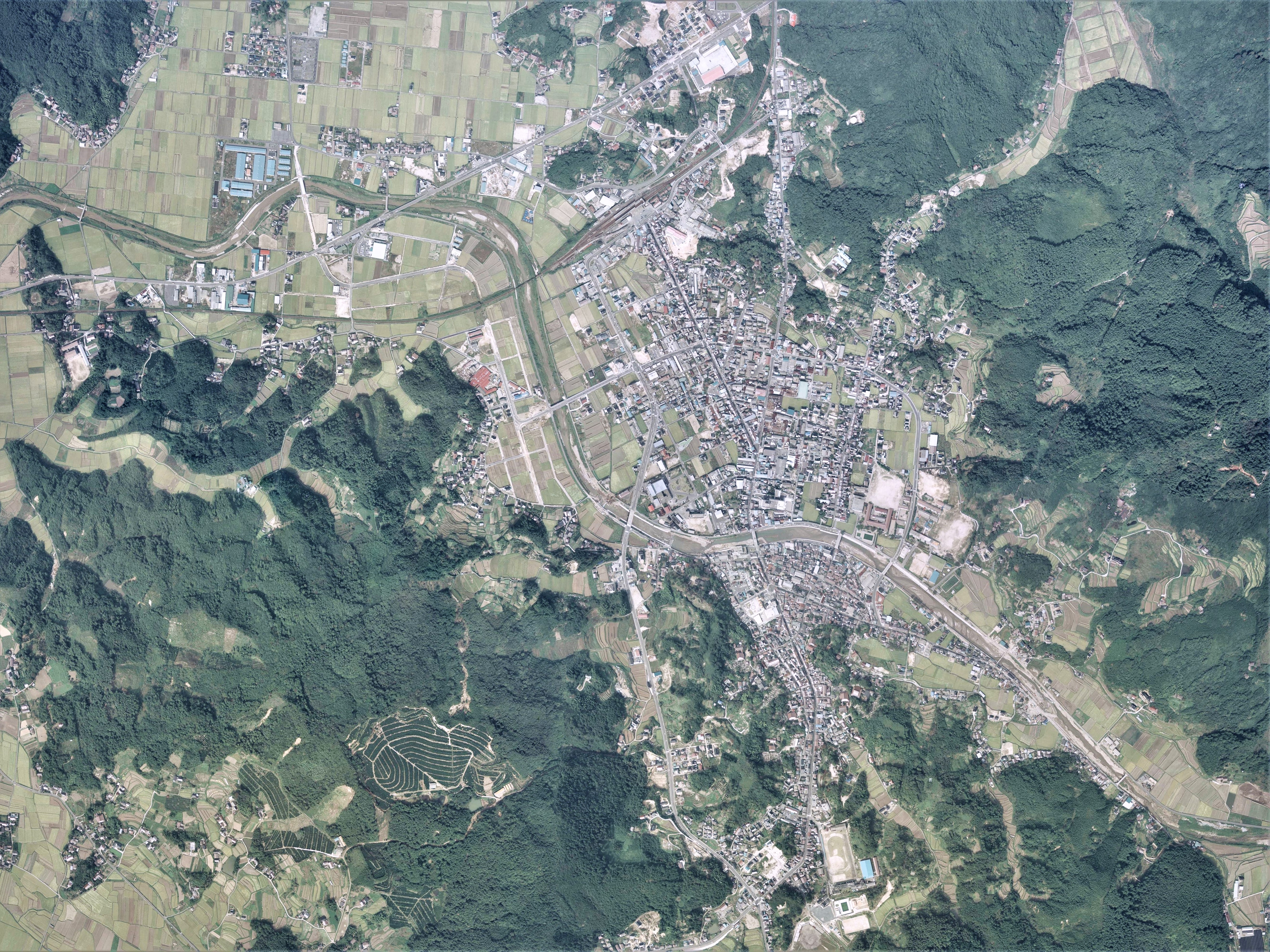
Aerial view of central Ōda

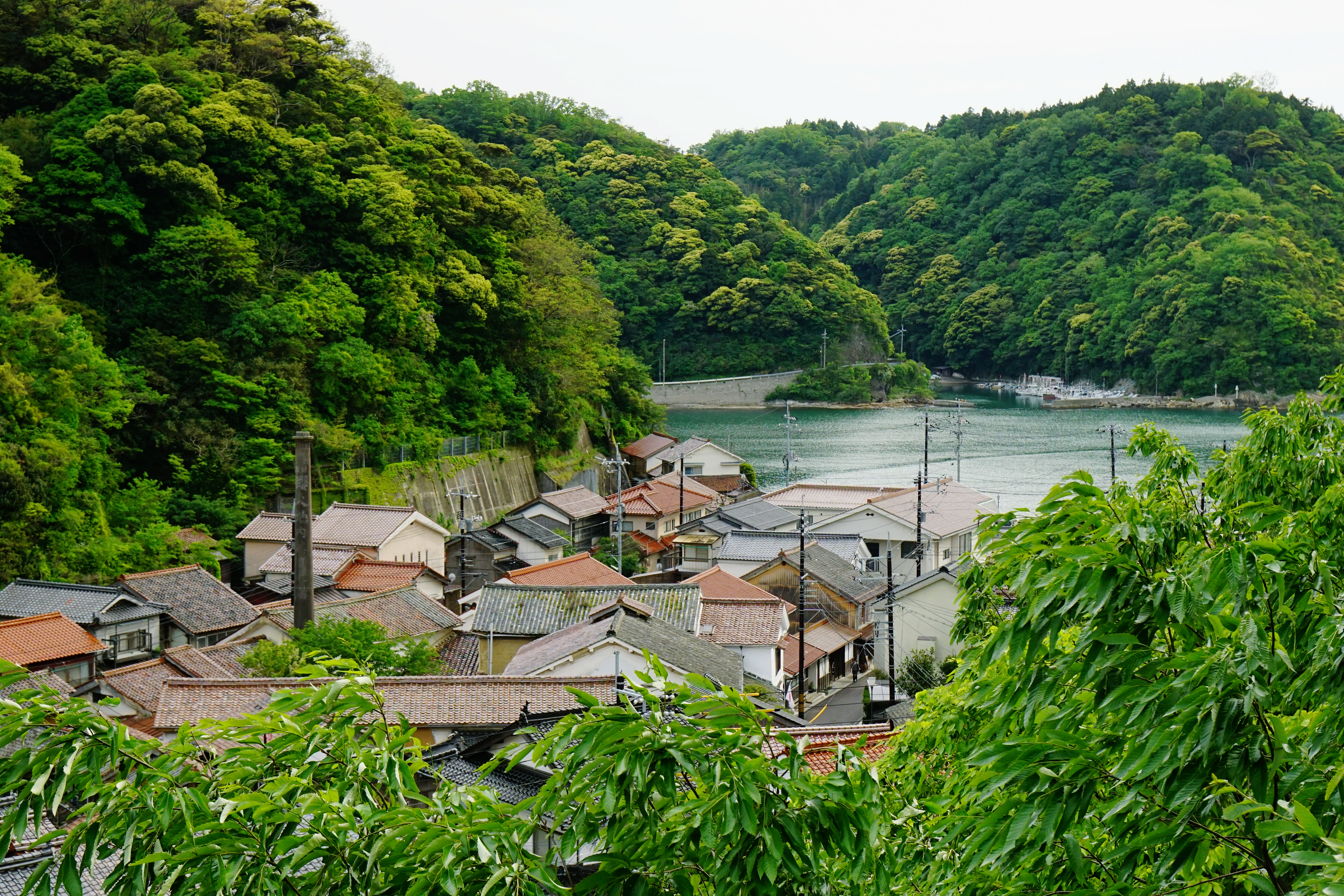
Yunotsu area of Ōda

Ōda (大田市, Ōda-shi; Japanese pronunciation: [ò̞ó̞.dä́(.ɕì), ó̞ó̞-]) is a city in Shimane Prefecture, Japan. The city has a total area of 436.11 km^{2}. As of 1 December 2022, the city had an estimated population of 32,838 in 15557 households and a population density of 75 persons per km^{2}. The total area of the city is 435.71 square kilometres (168.23 sq mi). Ōda is home to the Iwami Ginzan Silver Mine, a World Heritage Site.

== Geography ==
Located in the central coastal portion of Shimane Prefecture, Ōda borders the Sea of Japan to the north and the Chūgoku Mountains to the south. Mount Sanbe (1,126 metres (3,694 ft)), part of Daisen-Oki National Park, is a double volcano of the Hakusan Volcanic Zone, and is situated to the southeast of the city.

=== Neighboring municipalities ===
Shimane Prefecture

- Gōtsu
- Iinan
- Izumo
- Kawamoto
- Misato

=== Climate ===
Ōda has a humid subtropical climate (Köppen climate classification Cfa) with very warm summers and cool winters. Precipitation is abundant throughout the year. The average annual temperature in Ōda is 15.3 °C (59.5 °F). The average annual rainfall is 1,772.8 mm (69.80 in) with July as the wettest month. The temperatures are highest on average in August, at around 27.0 °C (80.6 °F), and lowest in January, at around 5.0 °C (41.0 °F). The highest temperature ever recorded in Ōda was 39.6 °C (103.3 °F) on 7 August 2026; the coldest temperature ever recorded was −7.5 °C (18.5 °F) on 26 February 1981.

Climate data for Ōda (1991−2020 normals, extremes 1978−present)
Month	Jan	Feb	Mar	Apr	May	Jun	Jul	Aug	Sep	Oct	Nov	Dec	Year
Record high °C (°F)	18.4 (65.1)	23.2 (73.8)	24.8 (76.6)	30.6 (87.1)	32.2 (90.0)	35.1 (95.2)	37.5 (99.5)	39.6 (103.3)	37.6 (99.7)	32.7 (90.9)	27.4 (81.3)	22.8 (73.0)	39.6 (103.3)
Mean daily maximum °C (°F)	8.8 (47.8)	9.8 (49.6)	13.4 (56.1)	18.8 (65.8)	23.7 (74.7)	26.6 (79.9)	30.3 (86.5)	32.2 (90.0)	27.9 (82.2)	22.7 (72.9)	16.9 (62.4)	11.2 (52.2)	20.2 (68.3)
Daily mean °C (°F)	5.0 (41.0)	5.5 (41.9)	8.3 (46.9)	13.3 (55.9)	18.0 (64.4)	21.7 (71.1)	25.8 (78.4)	27.0 (80.6)	22.7 (72.9)	17.2 (63.0)	12.1 (53.8)	7.3 (45.1)	15.3 (59.6)
Mean daily minimum °C (°F)	1.8 (35.2)	1.6 (34.9)	3.5 (38.3)	7.8 (46.0)	12.8 (55.0)	17.5 (63.5)	22.3 (72.1)	23.1 (73.6)	18.7 (65.7)	12.7 (54.9)	8.0 (46.4)	3.9 (39.0)	11.1 (52.1)
Record low °C (°F)	−5.8 (21.6)	−7.5 (18.5)	−2.8 (27.0)	−1.9 (28.6)	3.0 (37.4)	7.8 (46.0)	11.6 (52.9)	15.6 (60.1)	7.0 (44.6)	3.6 (38.5)	0.6 (33.1)	−2.7 (27.1)	−7.5 (18.5)
Average precipitation mm (inches)	119.6 (4.71)	104.0 (4.09)	131.6 (5.18)	125.3 (4.93)	144.4 (5.69)	193.1 (7.60)	238.3 (9.38)	144.8 (5.70)	193.0 (7.60)	113.9 (4.48)	121.5 (4.78)	141.1 (5.56)	1,772.8 (69.80)
Average precipitation days (≥ 1.0 mm)	16.5	13.4	12.9	10.1	9.7	11.2	11.5	9.5	10.5	9.7	11.8	15.7	142.5
Mean monthly sunshine hours	63.6	87.5	147.6	190.5	212.4	166.4	179.3	213.4	164.6	162.4	114.5	69.2	1,767.3
Source: Japan Meteorological Agency

=== Demographics ===
Per Japanese census data, the population of Ōda in 2020 is 32,846 people. Ōda has been conducting censuses since 1920.

Historical population
Year	Pop.	±%
1960	66,021	—
1965	58,564	−11.3%
1970	51,475	−12.1%
1975	49,433	−4.0%
1980	49,570	+0.3%
1985	49,277	−0.6%
1990	47,291	−4.0%
1995	44,953	−4.9%
2000	42,573	−5.3%
2005	40,703	−4.4%
2010	38,069	−6.5%
2015	35,166	−7.6%
2020	32,846	−6.6%
Ōda population statistics

== History ==
Most of the area of present-day Ōda is located in Iwami Province, although an eastern portion of the city was within the borders of Izumo Province. The area was a meeting point of three ancient transportation routes: the San'indō, Izumo Kaidō, and the Bingo Kaidō. As a result, numerous market towns were developed in the area. With the development of the Iwami Ginzan Silver Mine, the area was maintained as tenryō, or territory under the direct control of the Tokugawa shogunate, throughout the Edo Period. The village of Ōda within Ano District, Shimane, was established on 1 April 1889, with the creation of the modern municipalities system. Ōda was raised to town status on 6 November 1903. Ōda merged with the neighboring villages of Nagahisa, Torii, Kute, Hanehigashi, Kawai, Shizuma, and Kuri on 1 November 1954, and was raised to city status.

On 1 October 2005, the towns of Nima and Yunotsu (both from Nima District) were merged into Ōda. Therefore, Nima District was dissolved as a result of this merger.

== Government ==
Ōda has a mayor-council form of government with a directly elected mayor and a unicameral city council of 18 members. Ōda contributes two members to the Shimane Prefectural Assembly. In terms of national politics, the city is part of the Shimane 2nd district of the lower house of the Diet of Japan.

== Economy ==
Ōda remains a center of agricultural production. The city is a center for dairy farms. Fisheries (commercial fishing, seafood processing), roof tile manufacturing (Sekishu roof tiles), and tourism are also mainstays of the local economy.

== Education ==
Ōda has 16 public elementary schools and six public junior high schools operated by the city government, and two public high schools operated by the Shimane Prefectural Board of Education.

== Transportation ==
=== Railway ===
JR West (JR West) - San'in Main Line

- Iwami-Fukumitsu - Yunotsu - Yusato - Maji - Nima - Isotake - Shizuma - Ōdashi - Kute - Hane

=== Highways ===
- San'in Expressway
- National Route 9
- National Route 375

== Sister cities ==
- (South Korea) Daejeon, since 14 November 1987
- (Japan) Kasaoka, Okayama, since 14 April 1990

== Local attractions ==
=== Iwami Ginzan Silver Mine ===
Ōda is home to the Iwami Ginzan Silver Mine, a World Heritage Site. Iwami Ginzan was the largest silver mine in Japanese history. Active for almost four hundred years, it operated from the discovery of silver in the area in 1526 until 1923. Iwami Ginzan was the most important source of silver to the Tokugawa Shogunate during the Edo period (1603 – 1868), and was directly controlled by the Tokugawa government. The mine is a popular tourist destination in Shimane, and can be reached by bus from Ōda Station on the JR West Sanin Main Line.

=== Mononobe Shrine ===
The Mononobe Shrine is the ichinomiya of former Iwami Province.

=== Nima Sand Museum ===
The Nima Sand Museum features a large hourglass mechanism that automatically rotates from 31 December to 1 January. It is designated the largest hourglass in the world, but is not officially registered in Guinness World Records. This museum officially opened in March 1991.
