= Iwami Ginzan Silver Mine =

Ginzan Sakunouchi
UNESCO World Heritage Site
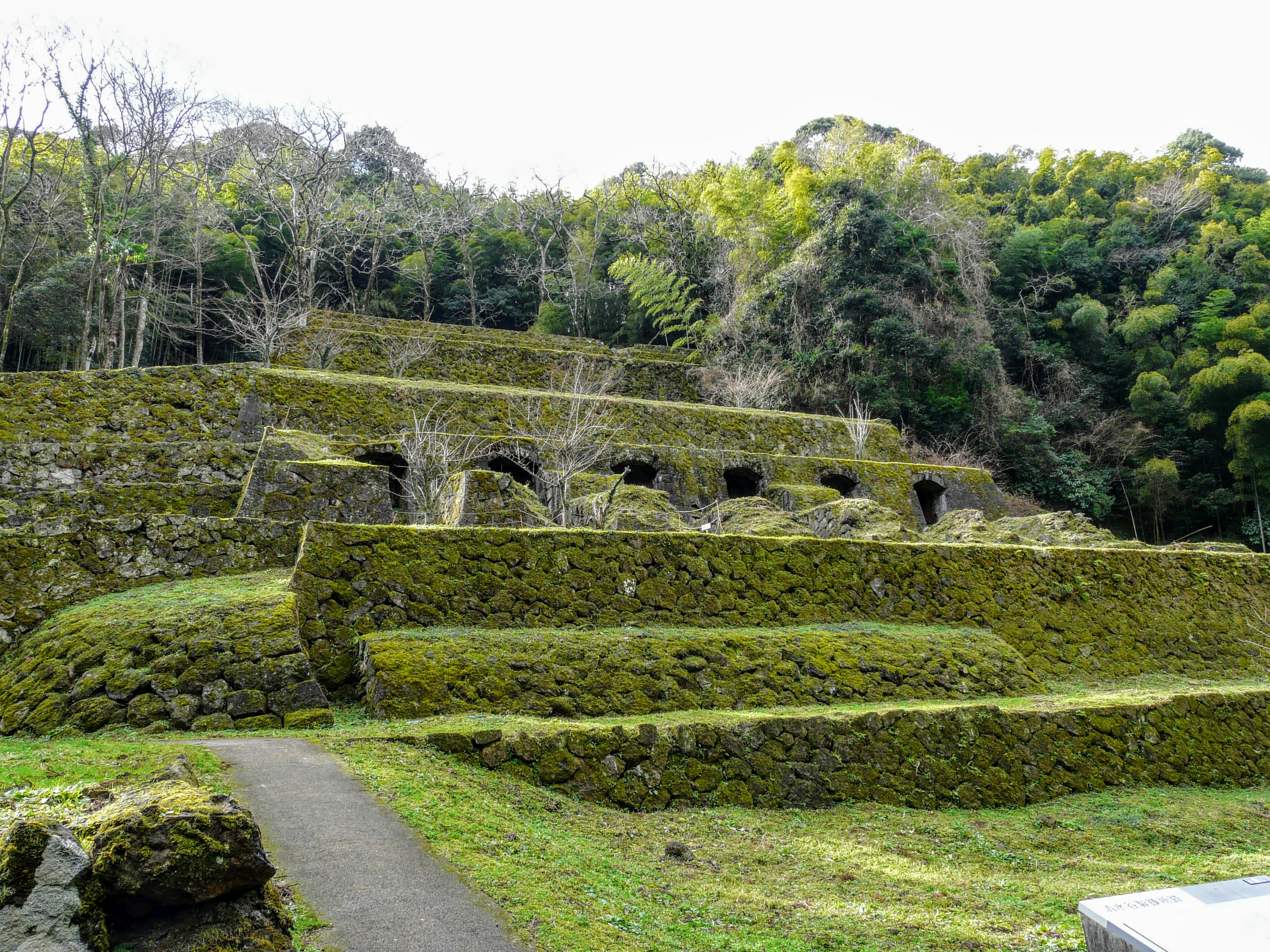
- Kamaya Mabu Mine Shaft

- Location within Japan
- Location: Ōda, Shimane Prefecture, Japan
- Part of: Iwami Ginzan Silver Mine and its Cultural Landscape
- Criteria: Cultural: (ii), (iii), (v)
- Reference: 1246bis-001a
- Inscription: 2007 (31st Session)
- Extensions: 2010
- Area: 317.08 ha (783.5 acres)
- Coordinates: 35°06′26″N 132°26′15″E

The Iwami Ginzan (石見銀山) was an underground silver mine in the city of Ōda, in Shimane Prefecture on the main island of Honshu, Japan. It was the largest silver mine in Japanese history. It was active for almost four hundred years, from its discovery in 1526 to its closing in 1923.

The mines, mining structures, and surrounding cultural landscape — listed as the "Iwami Ginzan Silver Mine and its Cultural Landscape" — became a UNESCO World Heritage Site in 2007.

== History ==
Ryūgen-ji mabu (mine tunnel)

The mine was discovered and developed in 1526 by Kamiya Jutei, a Japanese merchant. Jutei later introduced a Korean style of silver mining that would become the Haifukiho Method. The mine reached its peak production in the early 1600s, with approximately 38 tons of silver a year while Japan produced about 200 tons of silver a year which was then one third of the world's production.

Silver from the mine was used widely for coins in Japan. It was contested fiercely by warlords until the Tokugawa Shogunate won control of it in 1600 as a result of the Battle of Sekigahara in 1600. It was later secured by fences and barricaded by pine trees. Yamabuki Castle was built in the center of the mining complex.

Silver production from the mine fell in the 19th century, as it had trouble competing with mines elsewhere in the world. Mining for other minerals, such as copper, then replaced silver as the predominant material produced from the mountain. The mine was eventually closed in 1923.

== Economic influences ==
Iwami Ginzan Silver Mine played a pivotal role in East Asian trade, where silver was a key currency. In Europe and China, the mine had been known as the largest silver mine that could compare to the renowned Spanish colonial Cerro Rico mine of Potosí in the Viceroyalty of Peru, a present-day World Heritage Site in Bolivia.

In foreign countries, because the silver mined at Iwami Ginzan was of very high quality, it came to be known as one of the Japanese brands of silver, sold as "Soma Silver". The name derived from the village of Sama (Soma) in which the mine was located. This silver was given the highest trading credit in East Asia. From the 17th century on, the silver coins made from the mine's silver were traded as not only one of the basic currencies within Japan, but also as the currency for trade with China, Portugal, and the Netherlands. (Japan began trading with Portugal in late 16th century, and the Netherlands in the 17th century)

The prosperity of the mine can be known by its indication on the maps of the period as the "Silver Mine Kingdom". With the progress of navigation, the monarchs of Western Europe had gained many maps imported from Muslim civilizations, and then developed their own maps. A trading fleet using the maps sailed via India and China to Japan, to trade European goods for Japanese silver. The feudal lords who controlled the mine actively traded with the Europeans.

== World Heritage Site ==
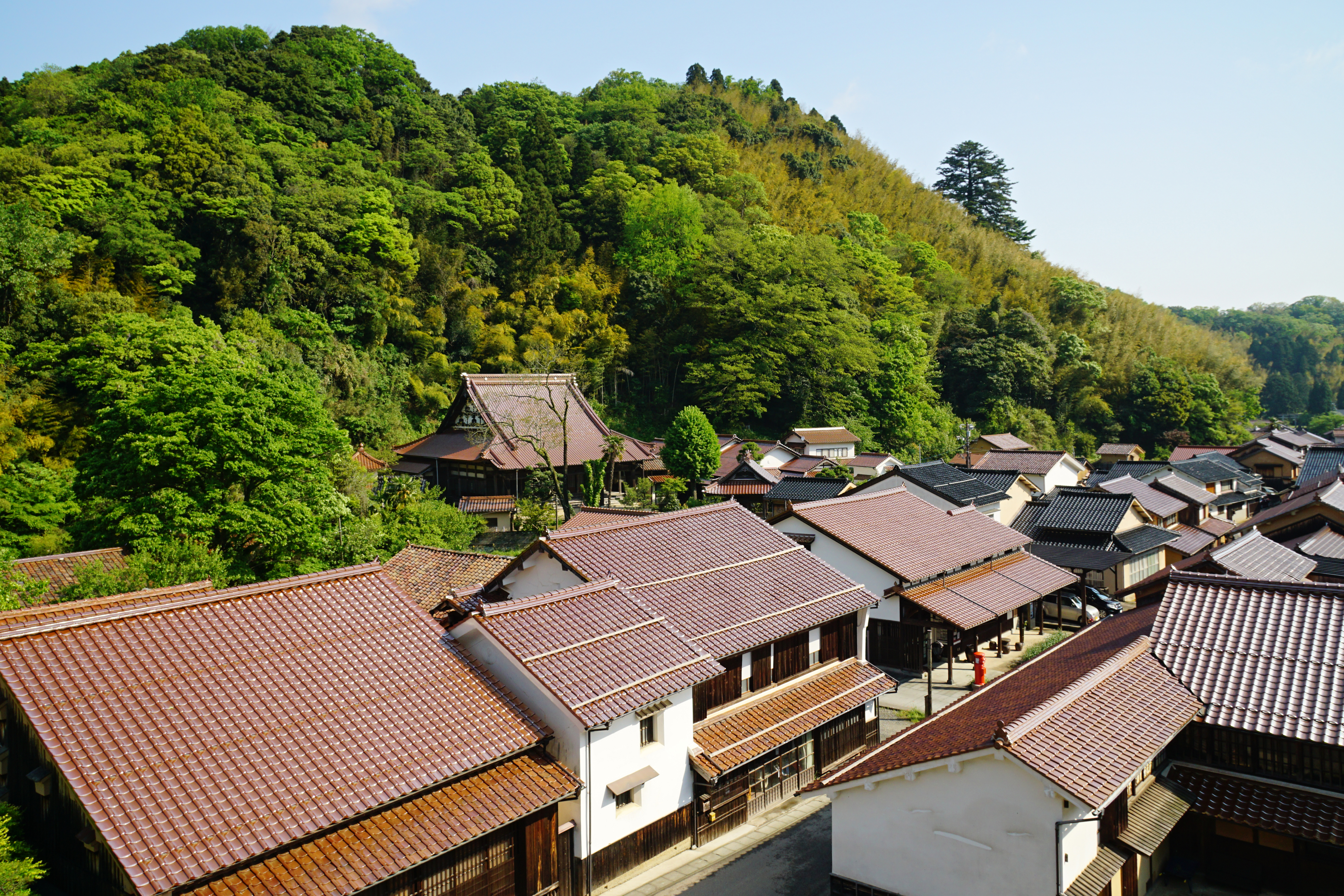
Ōmori Ginzan village

Parts of the mining town remain in good condition and the Japanese Government designated it as a Special Preservation District for Groups of Historic Buildings in 1969. The government also applied for it to become a World Heritage Site. An evaluation of the site by the International Council on Monuments and Sites (ICOSMOS)) found no "outstanding universal value. Nevertheless, the evaluating body concluded in its report that Iwami Ginzan was "a strong candidate for inscription as a World Heritage property" in the future. It recommended that the nomination be deferred for the time being so that more research on the property could be conducted.

The bid was finally successful in 2007, establishing the Iwami Ginzan Silver Mine and its Cultural Landscape as a listed World Heritage Site.

The development of a large silver mine usually requires substantial quantities of lumber to be harvested from surrounding forests. However, the development of Iwami Ginzan Silver Mine resulted in less deforestation and erosion because of "sustainable" control of logging, and also less soil and water pollution. It was one of the reasons that Iwami Ginzan Silver Mine was selected as a World Heritage Site. It was also declared in 2007 as among the 100 greatest geological sites of Japan.

=== Features ===
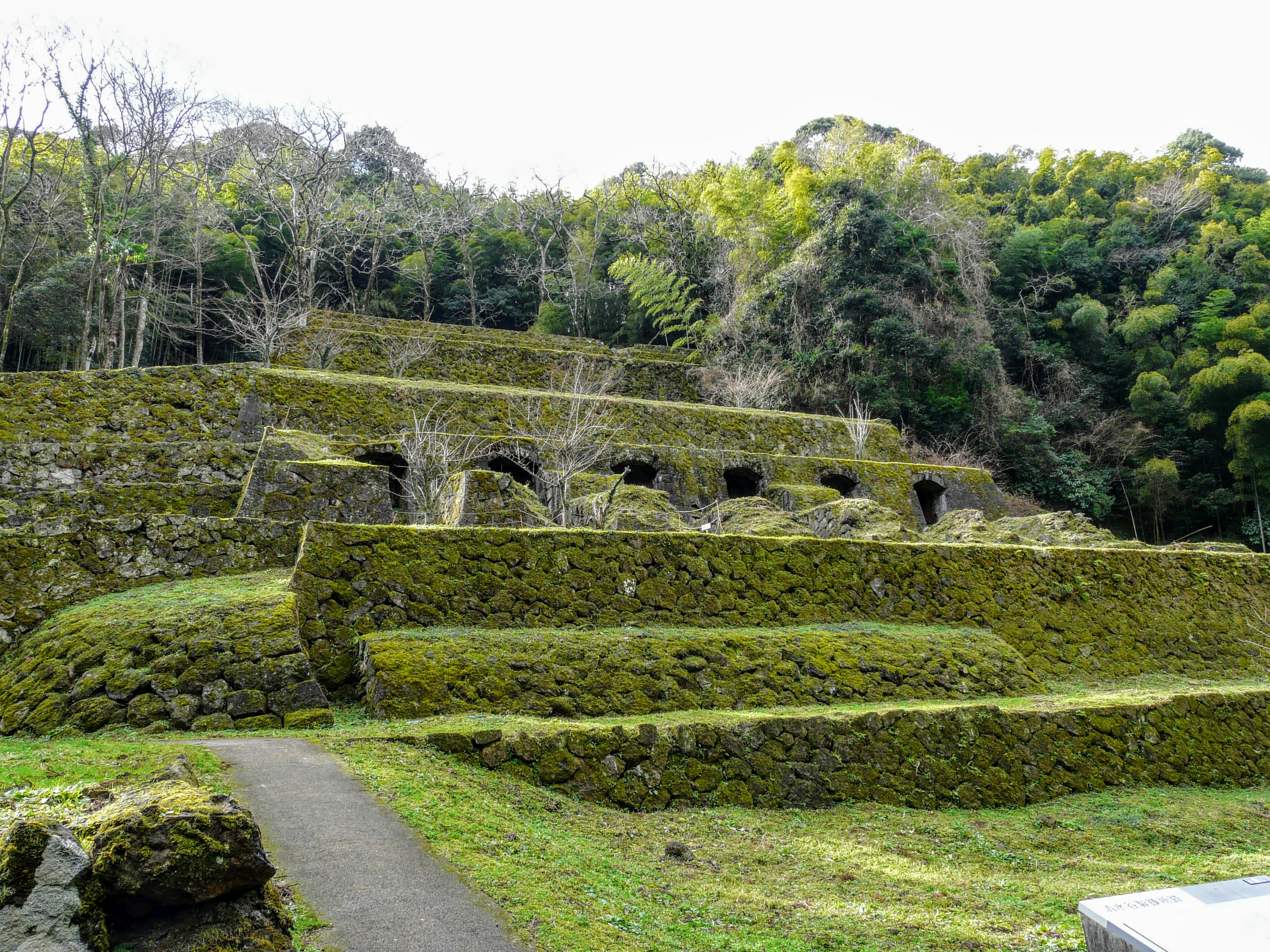
Iwami Ginzan Silver Mine: Shimizudani refinery ruins

The World Heritage Site includes:

- Iwami Ginzan's mining area of around six hundred pits and mine shafts
- Related processing, administrative, residential, and religious sites
- Three historic castles built in the 16th century to protect the mines
- Three service ports for shipping silver
- Connecting transportation routes

=== Components ===
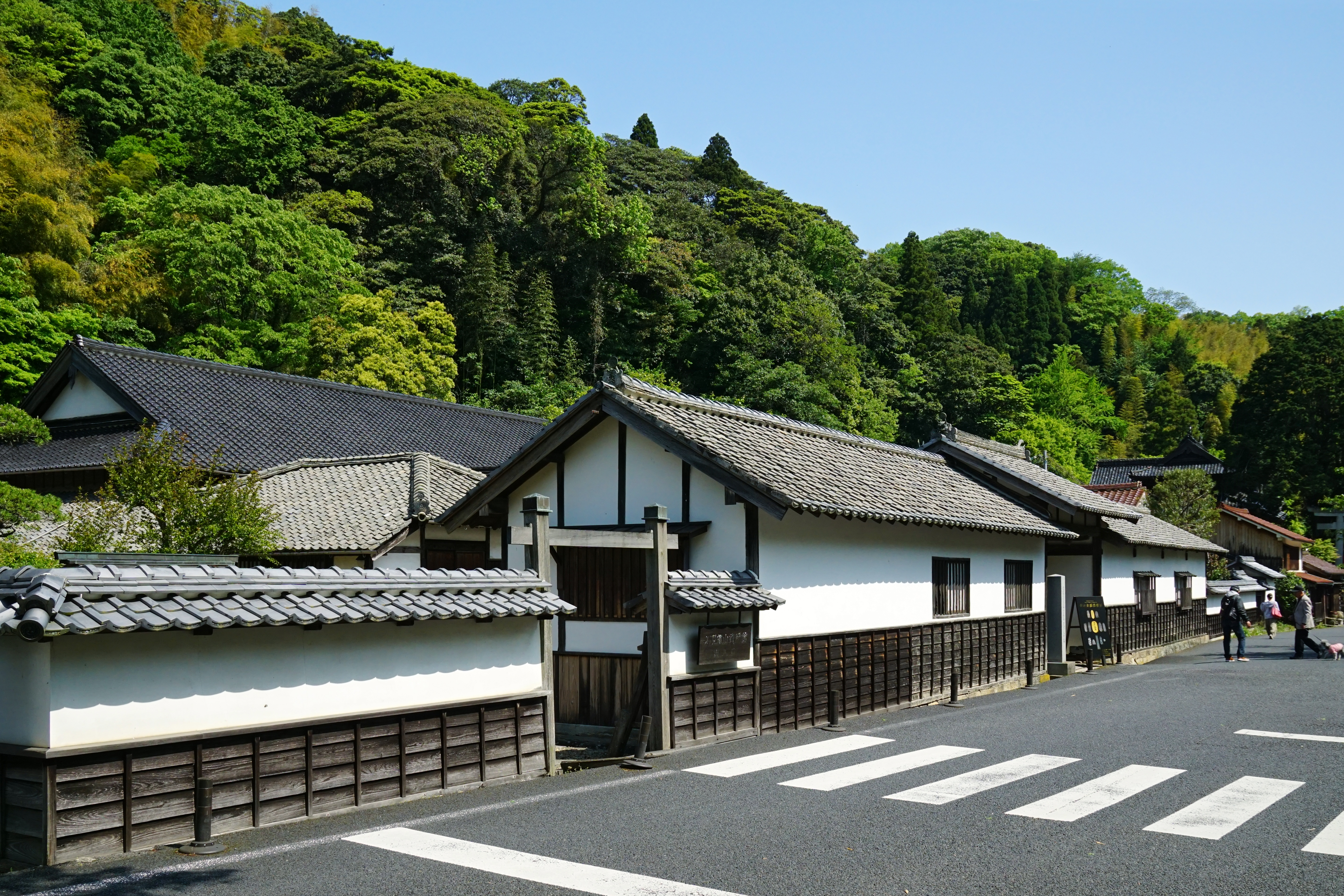
the Daikansho site (Ruins of the Oomori prefectural governor's office)

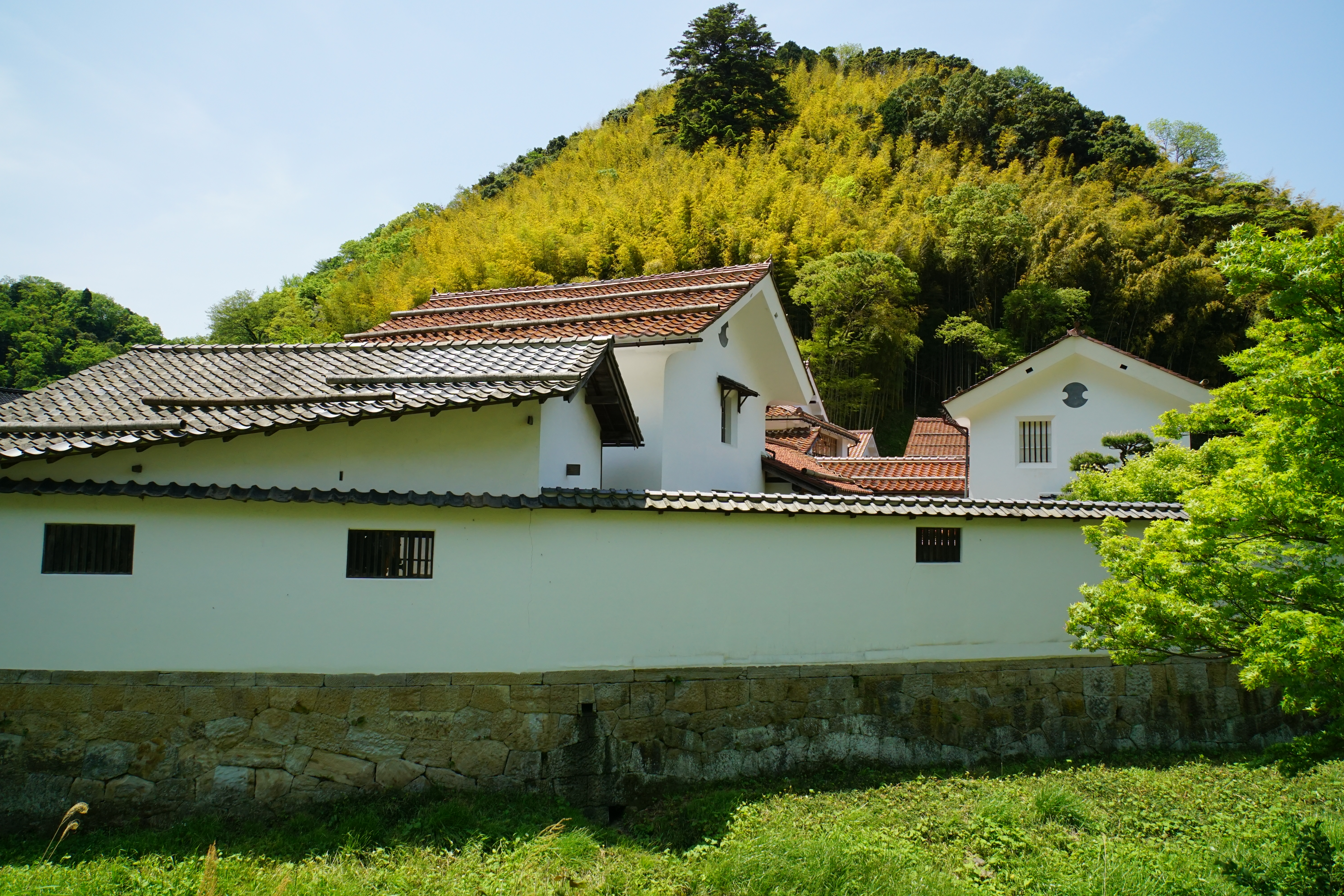
the House of the Kumagai Family

The fourteen nominated components assessed by ICOMOS are:

1. the mining area of Ginzan Sakunouchi (銀山柵内)
2. the Daikansho site
3. Yataki Castle site (矢滝城跡)
4. Yahazu Castle site (矢筈城跡)
5. Iwami Castle site (石見城跡)
6. the mining settlement of Ōmori Ginzan (大森銀山)
7. the silver refining facilities of Miyanomae (宮ノ前地区)
8. the House of the Kumagai Family (熊谷家住宅)
9. the temple Rakan-ji Gohyakurakan (羅漢寺)
10. Iwami Ginzan Kaidō Tomogauradō transportation route
11. Iwami Ginzan Kaidō Yunotsu-Okidomaridō transportation route
12. Tomogaura (鞆ヶ浦) service port/port town
13. Okidomari (沖泊) service port/port town
14. Yunotsu (温泉津) service port/port town

== Museums ==
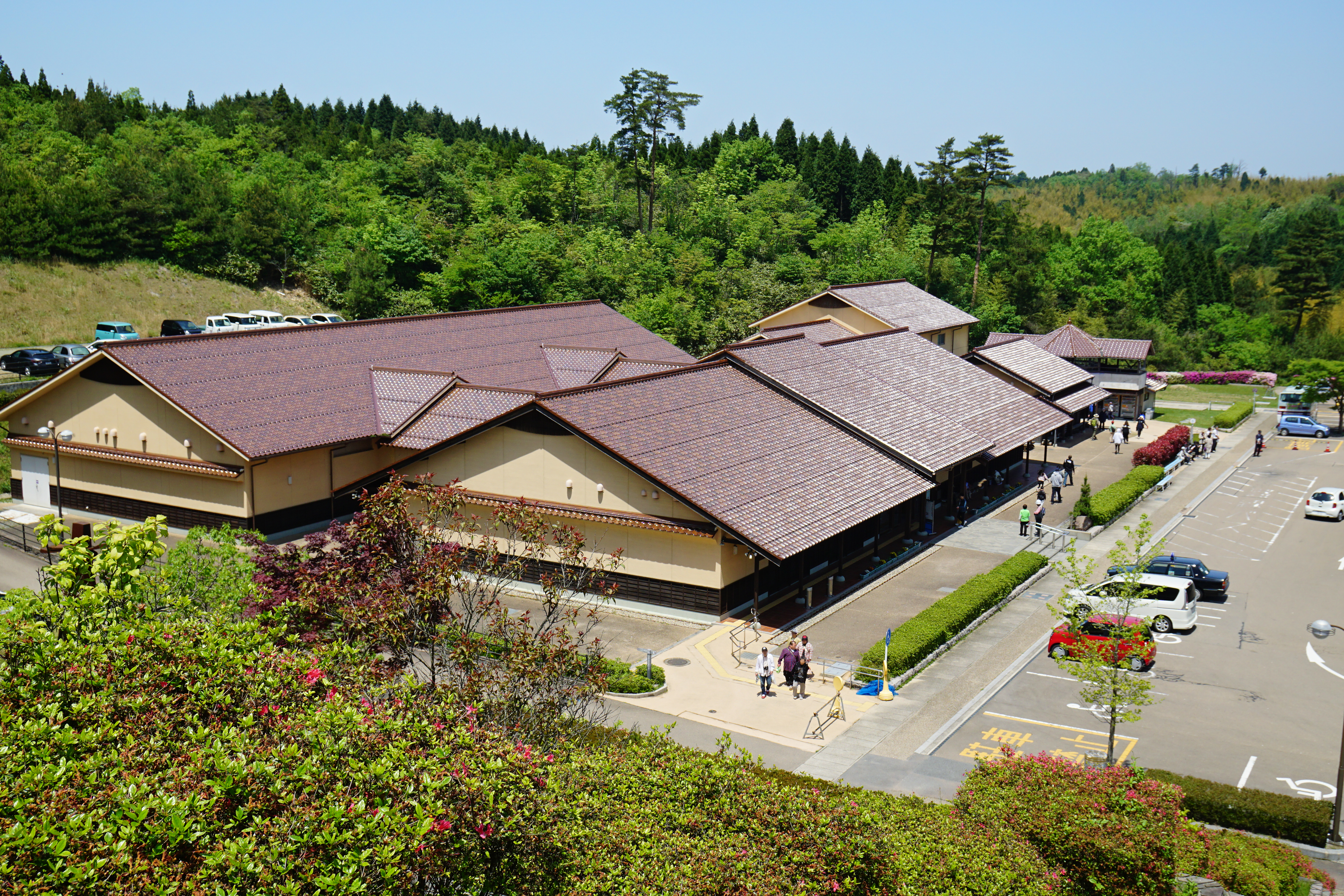
Iwami Ginzan World Heritage Center

- Iwami Ginzan World Heritage Center
- Iwami Silver Mine Museum

== See also ==
- Cultural landscape
- Cultural Landscape (Japan)
- List of World Heritage Sites in Japan
- Mining in Japan
