= Asari Station (Shimane) =

Railway station in Gōtsu, Shimane Prefecture, Japan

Asari Station 浅利駅
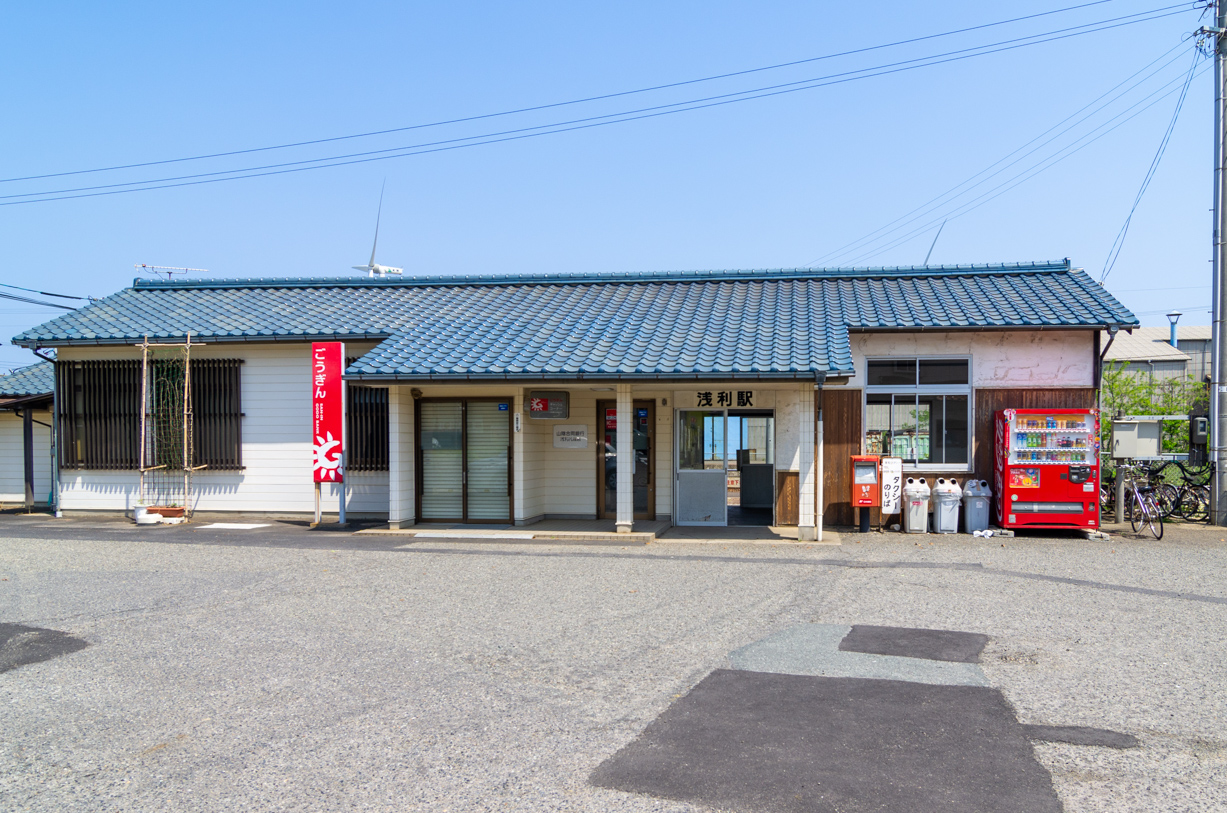
- Asari Station, May 2012

General information
- Location: 102 Asari-chō, Gōtsu-shi, Shimane-ken 695-0002; Japan
- Coordinates: 35°2′12.62″N 132°16′29.63″E
- Owner: West Japan Railway Company
- Operator: West Japan Railway Company
- Line: D San'in Main Line
- Distance: 448.0 km (278.4 miles) from Kyoto
- Platforms: 1 side platform
- Tracks: 2

Construction
- Structure type: At grade

Other information
- Status: Unstaffed
- Website: Official website

History
- Opened: 25 November 1918

Passengers
- FY2020: 35

Services
Preceding station	JR West	Following station
Gōtsu towards Masuda	San'in Line	Kuromatsu towards Yonago
Location
- Location within Shimane Prefecture Location within Japan

Asari Station (浅利駅, Asari-eki) is a passenger railway station located in the city of Gōtsu, Shimane Prefecture, Japan. It is operated by the West Japan Railway Company (JR West).

== Lines ==
Asari Station is served by the JR West San'in Main Line, and is located 448.0 kilometers from the terminus of the line at Kyoto. Only local trains stop at this station.

== Station layout ==
The station consists of one side platform serving a single bi-directional track. It used to be an island platform with two tracks, but now the tracks on the station building side have been removed. The station is unattended and the station building is now a branch of the San-in Godo Bank, using the space that was once the station office.

== History ==
Asari Station was opened on 25 November 1918. With the privatization of the Japan National Railway (JNR) on 1 April 1987, the station came under the aegis of the West Japan railway Company (JR West).

== Passenger statistics ==
In fiscal 2020, the station was used by an average of 35 passengers daily.

== Surrounding area ==
- Asari-ji
- Japan National Route 9

== See also ==
- List of railway stations in Japan
