= Kawahira Station =

Railway station in Gōtsu, Japan

Kawahira Station 川平駅
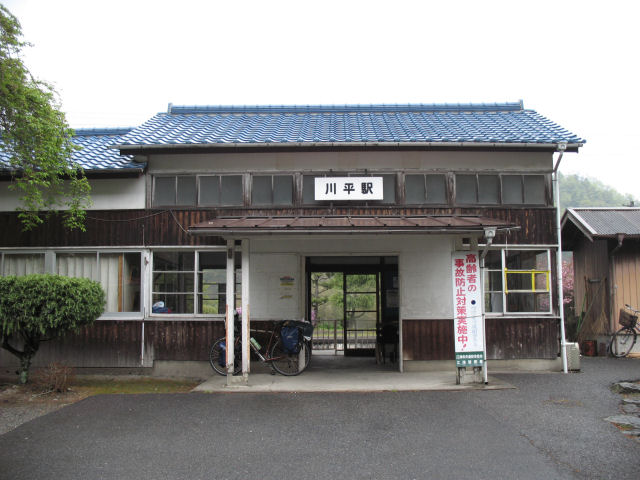
- Kawahira Station in April 2007

General information
- Location: 233, Kawahira-chō Minamikawanobori, Gōtsu （島根県江津市川平町南川上233） Shimane Prefecture; Japan
- Coordinates: 34°59′49″N 132°17′04″E
- Operator: JR West
- Line: F Sankō Line

History
- Opened: 1930
- Closed: 2018
Location
- Location within Japan

Kawahira Station (川平駅, Kawahira-eki) was a railway station in Gōtsu, Shimane Prefecture, Japan, operated by West Japan Railway Company (JR West).

== Lines ==
Kawahira Station was served by the 108.1 km Sankō Line from Gōtsu in Shimane Prefecture to Miyoshi in Hiroshima Prefecture, which closed on 31 March 2018.

== Adjacent stations ==
«	Service	»
Sankō Line
Chigane	Local	Kawado

== History ==
On 16 October 2015, JR West announced that it was considering closing the Sanko Line due to poor patronage. On 29 September 2016, JR West announced that the entire line would close on 31 March 2018. The line then closed on March 31, 2018, with an event hosted by JR West.

== See also ==
- List of railway stations in Japan
