= Iwami-Kawamoto Station =

Railway station in Kawamoto, Shimane prefecture, Japan

Iwami Kawamoto Station 石見川本駅
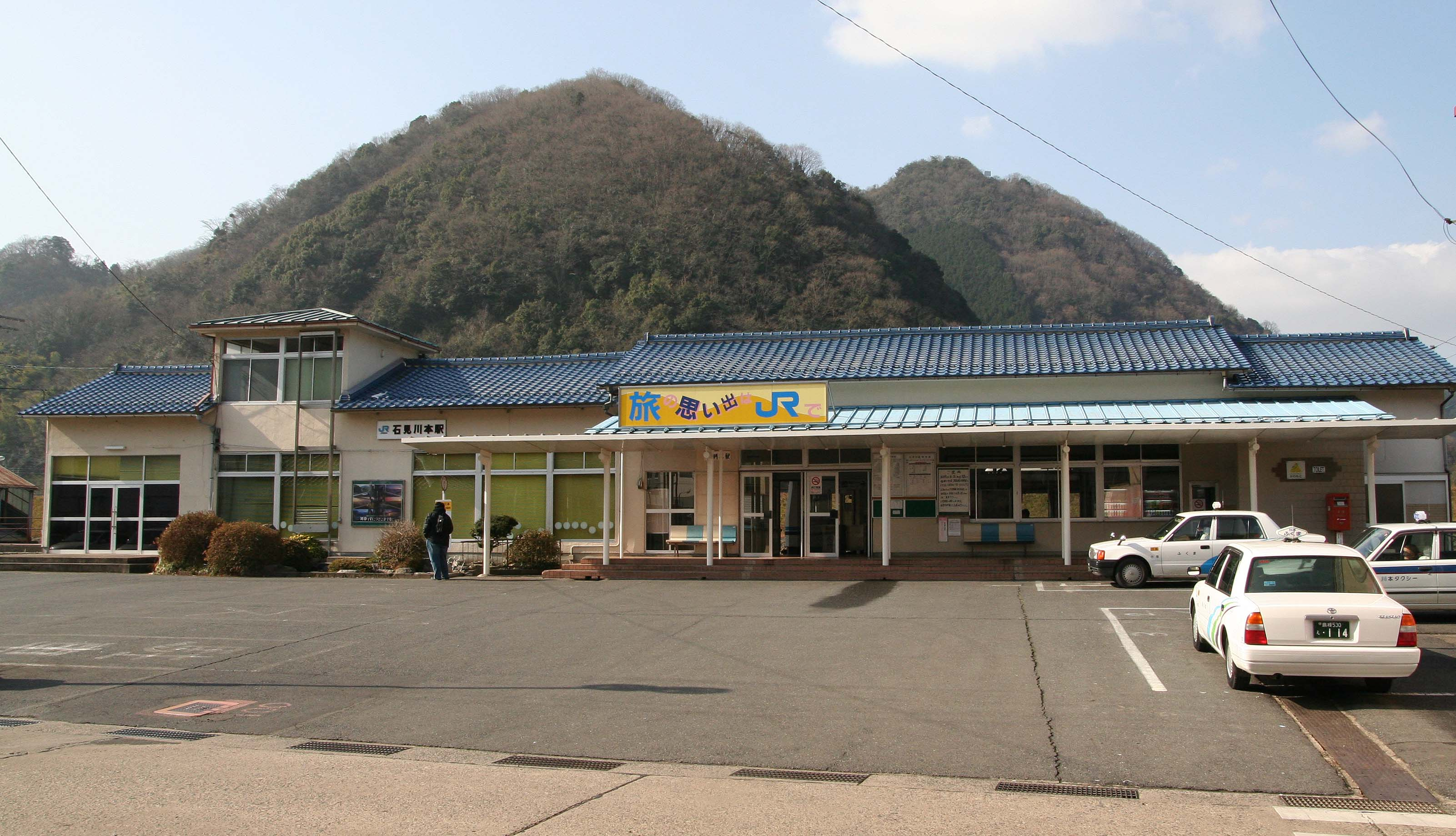
- Iwami Kawamoto Station in January 2008

General information
- Location: 593, Ōaza Kawamoto, Kawamoto, Ōchi （島根県邑智郡川本町大字川本593） Shimane Prefecture; Japan
- Coordinates: 34°59′29″N 132°29′34″E
- Operator: JR West
- Line: F Sankō Line
- Connections: Bus stop

History
- Opened: 1934
- Closed: 2018
Location
- Location within Japan

Iwami Kawamoto Station (石見川本駅, Iwami Kawamoto-eki) was a railway station in Kawamoto, Ōchi District, Shimane Prefecture, Japan, operated by West Japan Railway Company (JR West).

== Lines ==
Iwami Kawamoto Station was served by the 108.1 km Sankō Line from Gōtsu in Shimane Prefecture to Miyoshi in Hiroshima Prefecture, which closed on 31 March 2018.

== Adjacent stations ==
«	Service	»
Sankō Line
Inbara	Local	Kirohara

== History ==
On 16 October 2015, JR West announced that it was considering closing the Sanko Line due to poor patronage. On 29 September 2016, JR West announced that the entire line would close on 31 March 2018. The line then closed on March 31, 2018, with an event hosted by JR West.

== See also ==
- List of railway stations in Japan
