= Uzui Station =

Former railway station in Shimane Prefecture, Japan

Uzui Station 宇都井駅
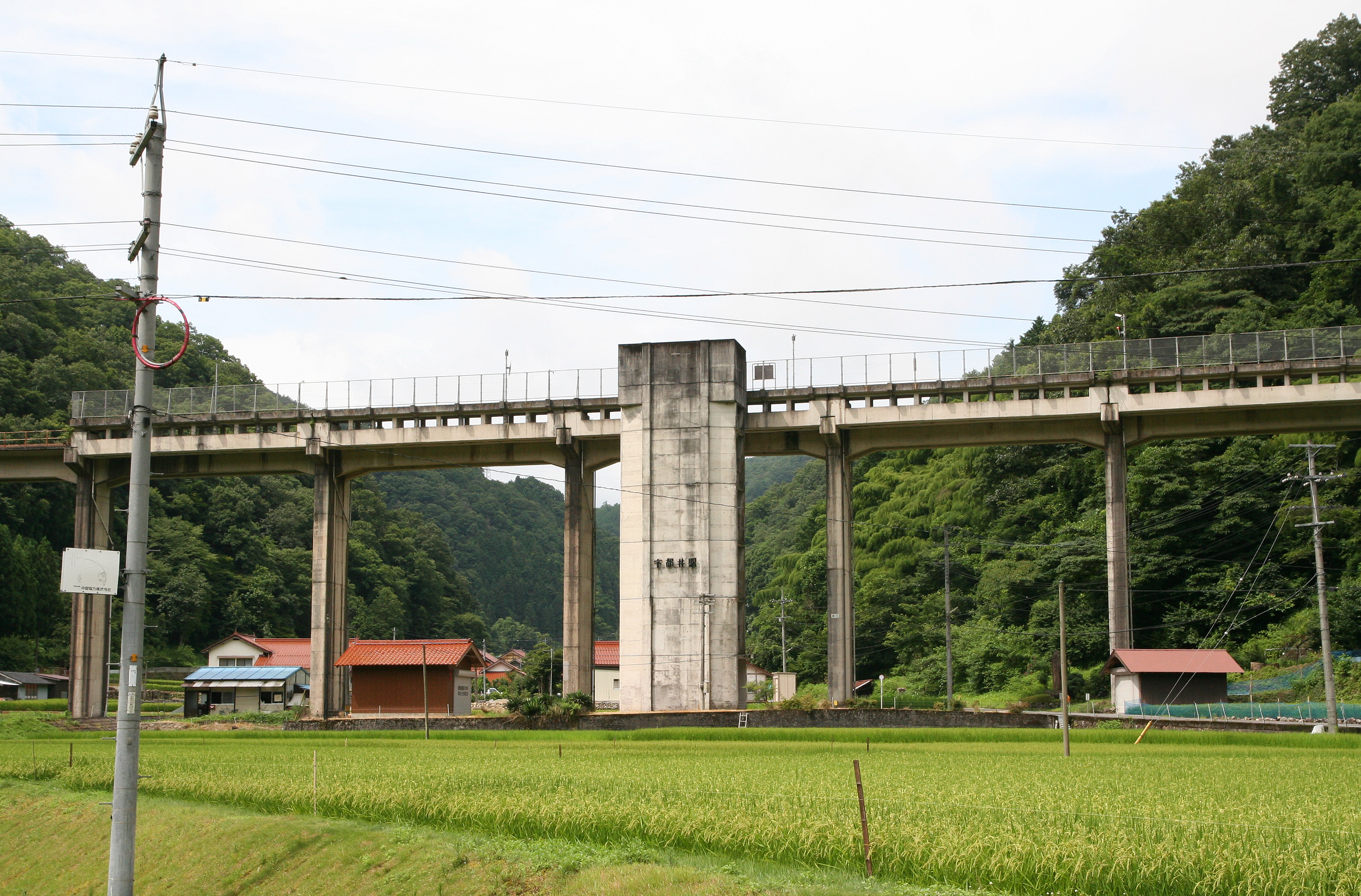
- Uzui Station viewed from ground level in July 2008

General information
- Location: 1044 Uzui, Ōnan-chō, Ōchi-gun, Shimane-ken 696-0503; Japan
- Coordinates: 34°54′25″N 132°37′47″E
- Operator: JR West
- Line: F Sankō Line
- Distance: 74.8 km from Gōtsu
- Platforms: 1 side platform
- Tracks: 1

Other information
- Status: Unstaffed

History
- Opened: 31 August 1975
- Closed: 31 March 2018
Location
- Location within Japan

Uzui Station (宇都井駅, Uzui-eki) is an unstaffed railway station on the Sankō Line in Ōnan, Shimane, Japan, operated by West Japan Railway Company (JR West). Opened in 1975, this station closed on 31 March 2018 with the closure of the entire Sanko Line.

== Lines ==
Uzui Station was served by the 108.1 km Sankō Line from Gōtsu in Shimane Prefecture to Miyoshi in Hiroshima Prefecture, which closed on 31 March 2018. As of June 2009, the station was served by four trains in each direction daily.

== Layout ==
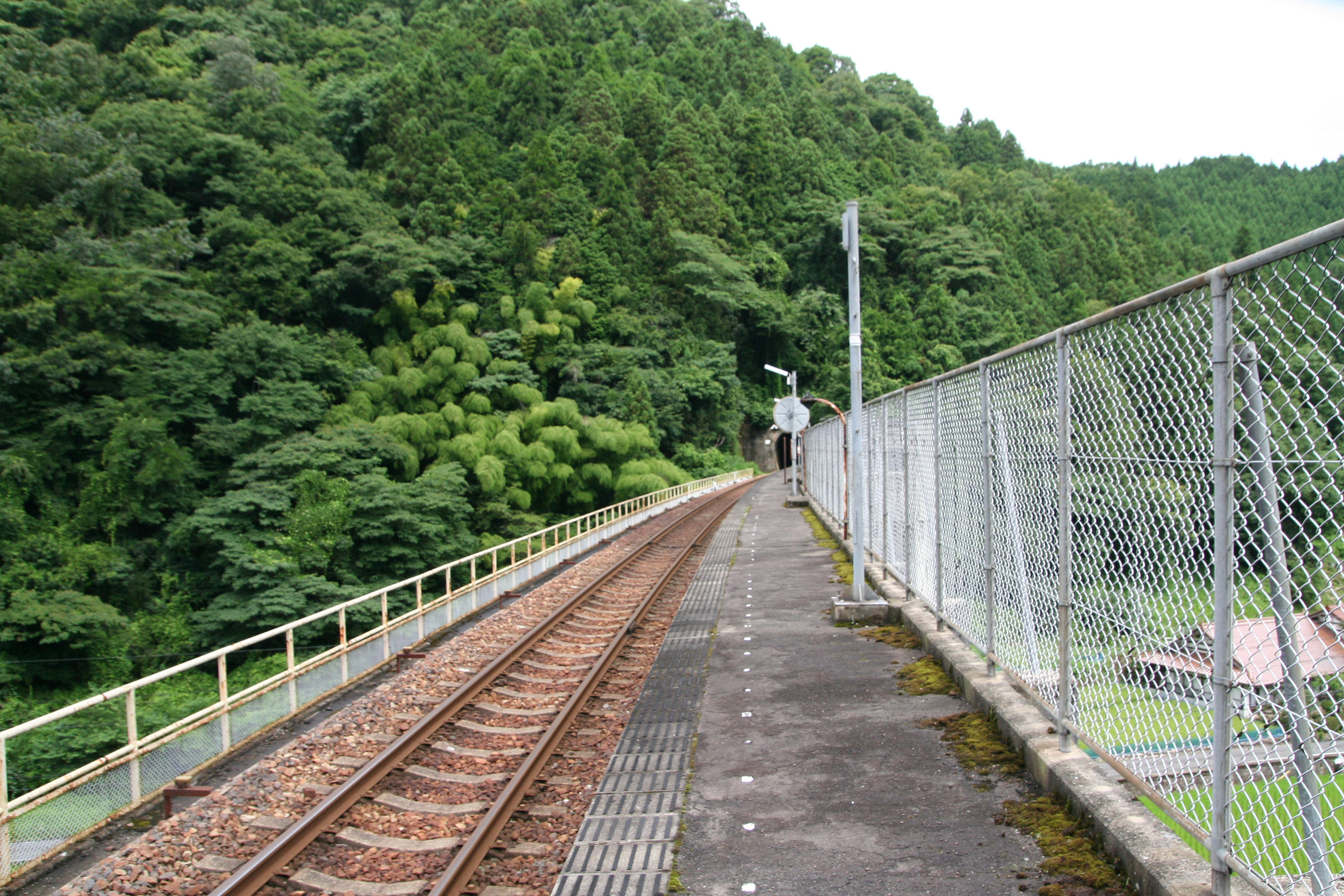
The view from the platform in July 2008

The station consists of a single side platform serving a single track elevated approximately 30 m above ground level. Sole access to the platform is by a concrete staircase, with no lift or escalator.

== Adjacent stations ==
«	Service	»
Sankō Line
Iwami-Tsuga	Local	Ikawashi

== History ==
The station opened on 31 August 1975. With the privatization of Japanese National Railways (JNR) on 1 April 1987, the station came under the control of JR West.

On 16 October 2015, JR West announced that it was considering closing the Sanko Line due to poor patronage. On 29 September 2016, JR West announced that the entire line would close on 31 March 2018. The line then closed on 31 March 2018, with an event hosted by JR West.

== See also ==
- List of railway stations in Japan
