= Nagatani Station =

Railway station in Miyoshi, Hiroshima prefecture, Japan

Nagatani Station 長谷駅
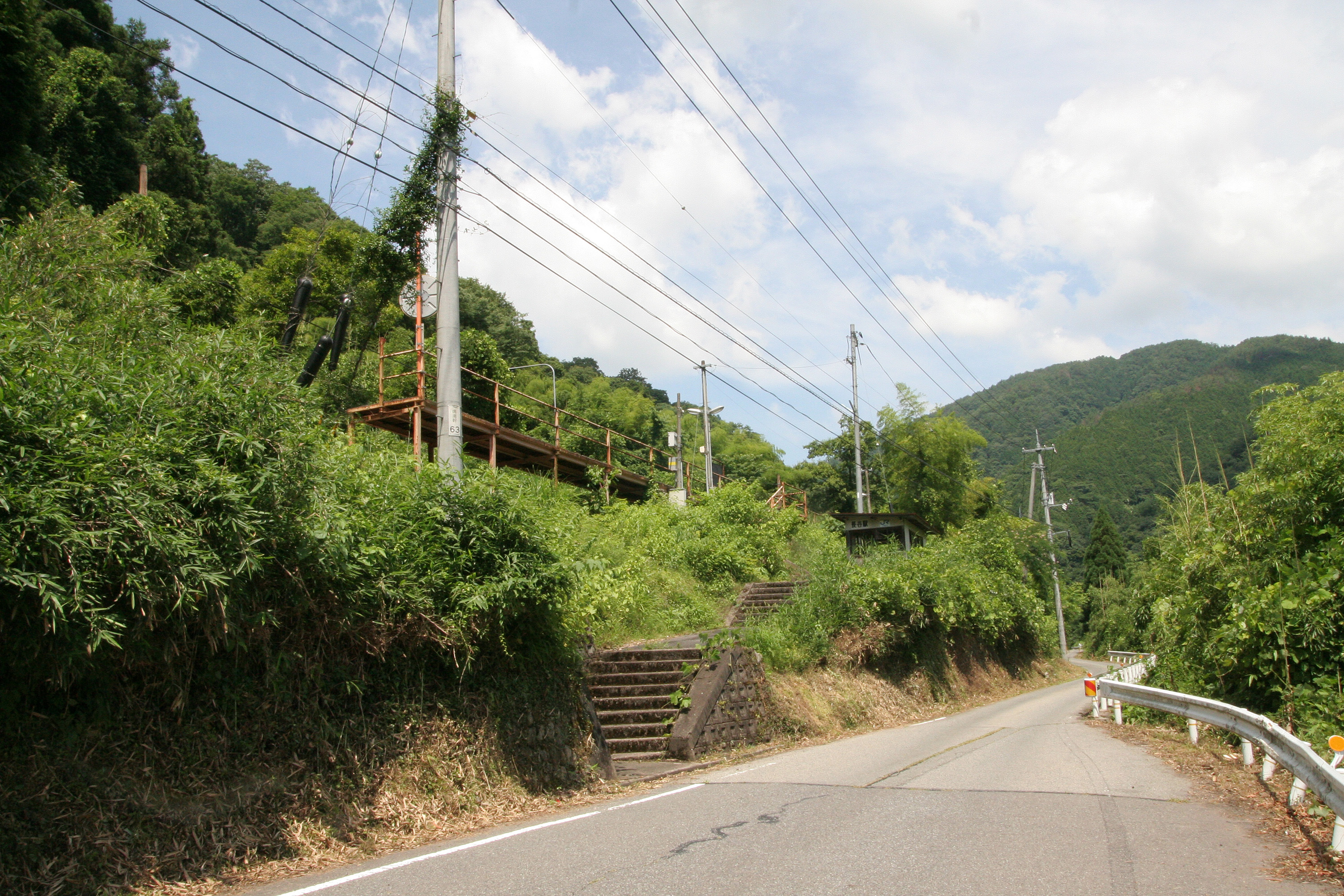
- Nagatani Station in July 2008

General information
- Location: Nagatani, Awaya-machi, Miyoshi-shi, Hiroshima-ken 728-0025; Japan
- Coordinates: 34°48′12″N 132°47′17″E
- Operator: JR West
- Line: F Sankō Line
- Distance: 100.6 km from Gōtsu

Other information
- Website: Official website

History
- Opened: 25 April 1969
- Closed: 31 March 2018
Location
- Location within Japan

Nagatani Station (長谷駅, Nagatani-eki) was a railway station on the Sankō Line in Miyoshi, Hiroshima Prefecture, Japan, operated by West Japan Railway Company (JR West). Opened in 1969, The station closed on 31 March 2018 with the closure of the entire Sanko Line.

== Lines ==
Nagatani Station was served by the 108.1 km Sankō Line from Gōtsu in Shimane Prefecture to Miyoshi in Hiroshima Prefecture, which closed on 31 March 2018. The station was located 100.6 km from the starting point of the line at Gōtsu.

== Adjacent stations ==
«	Service	»
Sankō Line
Funasa	Local	Awaya

== History ==
The station opened on 25 April 1969. With the privatization of Japanese National Railways (JNR) on 1 April 1987, the station came under the control of JR West.

On 16 October 2015, JR West announced that it was considering closing the Sanko Line due to poor patronage. On 29 September 2016, JR West announced that the entire line would close on 31 March 2018. The line then closed on 31 March 2018, with an event hosted by JR West.

== See also ==
- List of railway stations in Japan
