= Awaya =

Awaya (written: 粟屋 or 淡谷) is a Japanese surname. Notable people with the surname include:

- Noriko Awaya (淡谷 のり子, 1907–1999), Japanese singer
- Senkichi Awaya (粟屋 仙吉, 1893–1945), Japanese government official

== Fictional Characters ==
=== Surname ===
- Mugi Awaya of Scum's Wish

== See also ==
- Awaya Station, a railway station in Miyoshi, Hiroshima Prefecture, Japan
