= Iwami-Kawagoe Station =

Former railway station in Gōtsu, Japan

Iwami-Kawagoe Station 石見川越駅
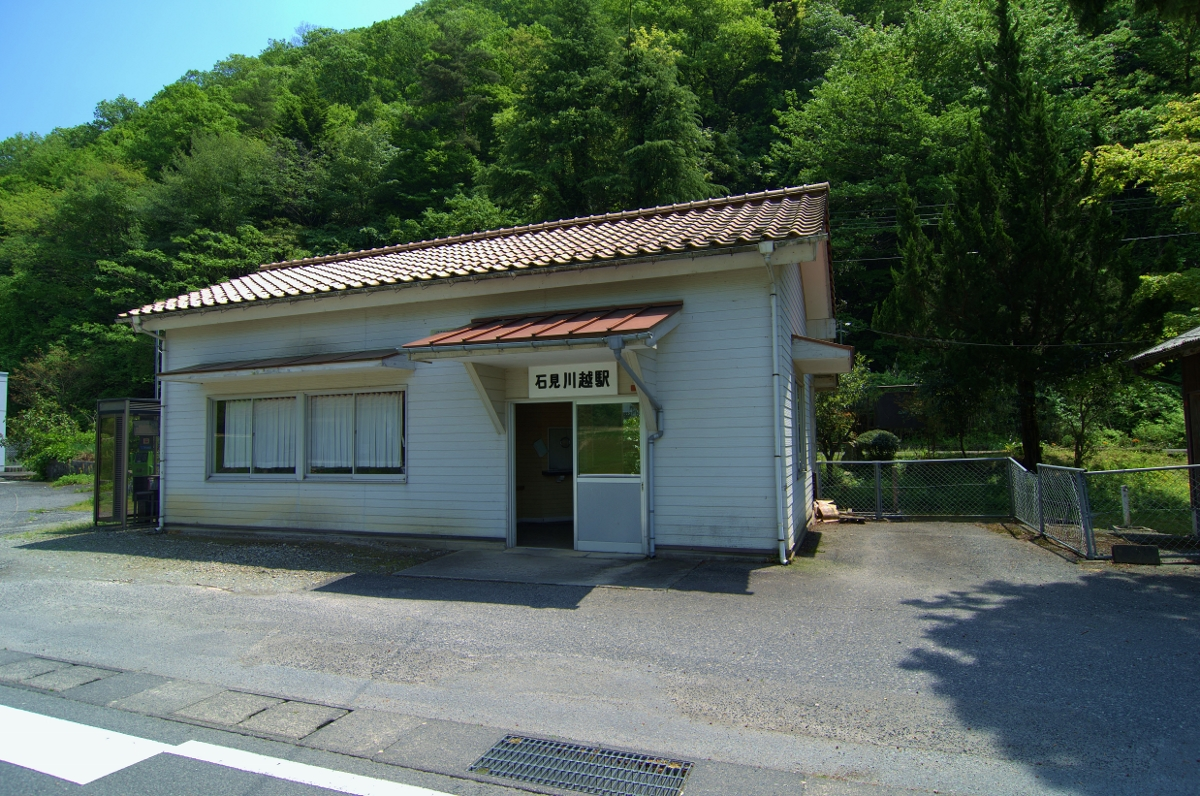
- Iwami-Kawagoe Station in May 2012

General information
- Location: 517, Sakurae-chō Kawagoe, Gōtsu （島根県江津市桜江町川越517） Shimane Prefecture; Japan
- Coordinates: 34°57′00″N 132°24′55″E
- Operator: JR West
- Line: F Sankō Line

History
- Opened: 1931
- Closed: 2018
Location
- Location within Japan

Iwami-Kawagoe Station (石見川越駅, Iwami Kawagoe-eki) was a railway station in Gōtsu, Shimane Prefecture, Japan, operated by West Japan Railway Company (JR West).

== Lines ==
Iwami-Kawagoe Station was served by the 108.1 km Sankō Line from Gōtsu in Shimane Prefecture to Miyoshi in Hiroshima Prefecture, which closed on 31 March 2018.

== Adjacent stations ==
«	Service	»
Sankō Line
Tazu	Local	Shikaga

== History ==
On 16 October 2015, JR West announced that it was considering closing the Sanko Line due to poor patronage. On 29 September 2016, JR West announced that the entire line would close on 31 March 2018.

== See also ==
- List of railway stations in Japan
