= Shikaga Station =

Railway station in Gōtsu, Japan

Shikaga Station 鹿賀駅
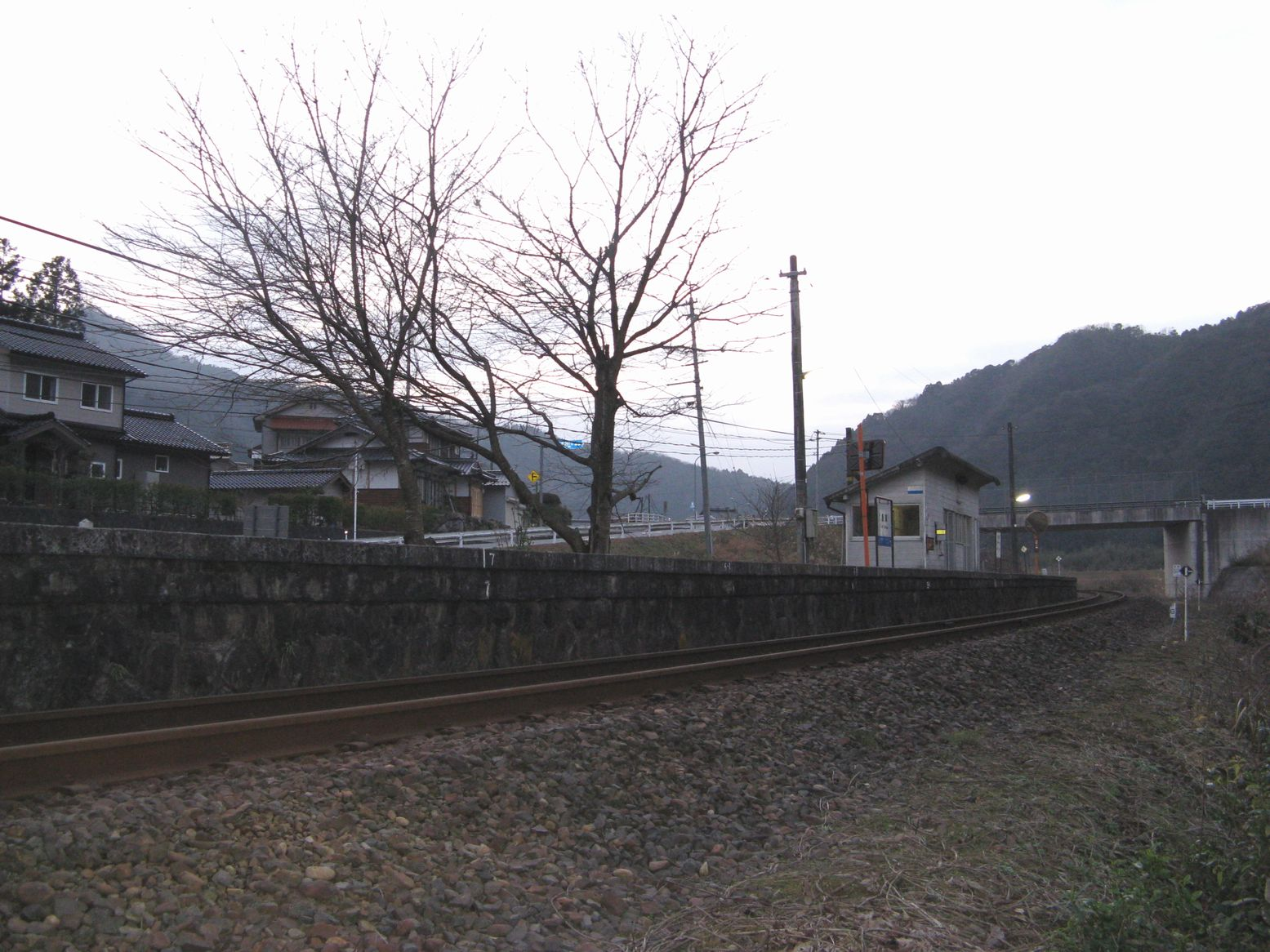

General information
- Location: 197, Sakurae-chō Shikaga, Gōtsu （島根県江津市桜江町鹿賀197） Shimane Prefecture; Japan
- Coordinates: 34°57′47″N 132°26′46″E
- Operator: JR West
- Line: F Sankō Line

History
- Opened: 1949
- Closed: 2018
Location
- Location within Japan

Shikaga Station (鹿賀駅, Shikaga-eki) was a railway station in Gōtsu, Shimane Prefecture, Japan, operated by West Japan Railway Company (JR West).

== Lines ==
Shikaga Station was served by the 108.1 km Sankō Line from Gōtsu in Shimane Prefecture to Miyoshi in Hiroshima Prefecture, which closed on 31 March 2018.

== Layout ==
The station does not have a ticket gate and only provides a covered waiting area. Near the station is the Mizu no Kuni Museum 104º, a museum for the franchise.

== Adjacent stations ==
«	Service	»
Sankō Line
Iwami-Kawagoe	Local	Inbara

== History ==
On 16 October 2015, JR West announced that it was considering closing the Sanko Line due to poor patronage. On 29 September 2016, JR West announced that the entire line would close on 31 March 2018. The line then closed on March 31, 2018, with an event hosted by JR West.

== See also ==
- List of railway stations in Japan
