= Gōtsuhommachi Station =

Railway station in Gōtsu, Shimane Prefecture, Japan

Gōtsuhommachi Station 江津本町駅
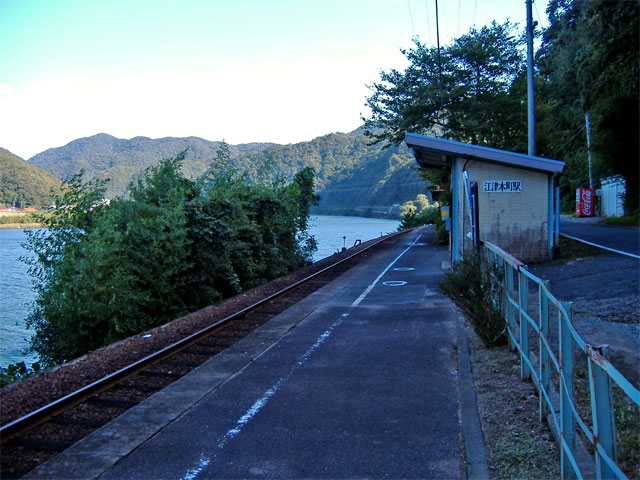
- Gōtsuhommachi Station in October 2007

General information
- Location: 1579 Gōtsu-chō, Gōtsu-shi, Shimane-ken; Japan
- Coordinates: 35°00′26″N 132°13′48″E
- Operator: JR West
- Line: F Sankō Line
- Distance: 1.1 km from Gōtsu

Other information
- Website: Official website

History
- Opened: 14 July 1958
- Closed: 31 March 2018
Location
- Location within Japan

Gōtsuhommachi Station (江津本町駅, Gōtsu Honmachi-eki) was a railway station on the Sankō Line in Gōtsu, Shimane Prefecture, Japan, operated by West Japan Railway Company (JR West). Opened in 1958, the station closed on 31 March 2018 with the closure of the entire Sankō Line.

== Lines ==
Gōtsuhommachi Station was served by the 108.1 km Sankō Line from Gōtsu in Shimane Prefecture to Miyoshi in Hiroshima Prefecture, and lies 1.1 km from the starting point of the line at Gōtsu Station.

== Adjacent stations ==
«	Service	»
Sankō Line
Gōtsu	Local	Chigane

== History ==
The station opened on 14 July 1958. With the privatization of Japanese National Railways (JNR) on 1 April 1987, the station came under the control of JR West.

On 16 October 2015, JR West announced that it was considering closing the Sanko Line due to poor patronage. On 29 September 2016, JR West announced that the entire line would close on 31 March 2018. The line then closed on 31 March 2018, with an event hosted by JR West.

== See also ==
- List of railway stations in Japan
