= Chigane Station =

Former railway station in Gōtsu, Shimane Prefecture, Japan

Chigane Station 千金駅
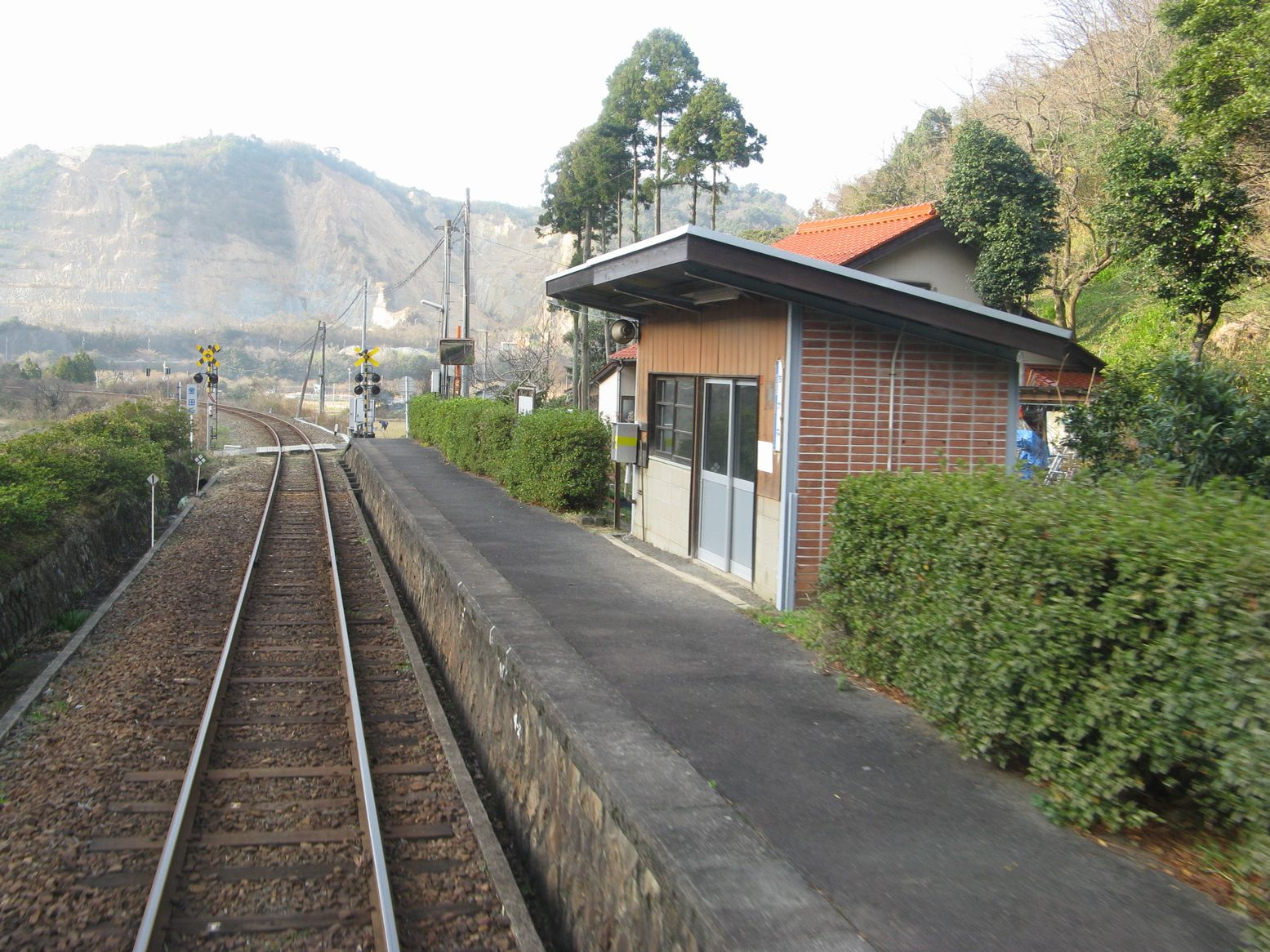
- Chigane Station in January 2008

General information
- Location: 54, Kaneta-chō i, Gōtsu （島根県江津市金田町イ54） Shimane Prefecture; Japan
- Coordinates: 35°00′06″N 132°15′00″E
- Operator: JR West
- Line: F Sankō Line

History
- Opened: 1958
- Closed: 2018
Location
- Location within Japan

Chigane Station (千金駅, Chigane-eki) was a railway station in Gōtsu, Shimane Prefecture, Japan, operated by West Japan Railway Company (JR West).

== Lines ==
Chigane Station was served by the 108.1 km Sankō Line from Gōtsu in Shimane Prefecture to Miyoshi in Hiroshima Prefecture, which closed on 31 March 2018.

== Adjacent stations ==
«	Service	»
Sankō Line
Gōtsuhommachi	Local	Kawahira

== History ==
On 16 October 2015, JR West announced that it was considering closing the Sanko Line due to poor patronage. On 29 September 2016, JR West announced that the entire line would close on 31 March 2018. The line then closed on March 31, 2018, with an event hosted by JR West.

== See also ==
- List of railway stations in Japan
