= Kawado Station =

Former railway station in Gōtsu, Japan

Kawado Station 川戸駅
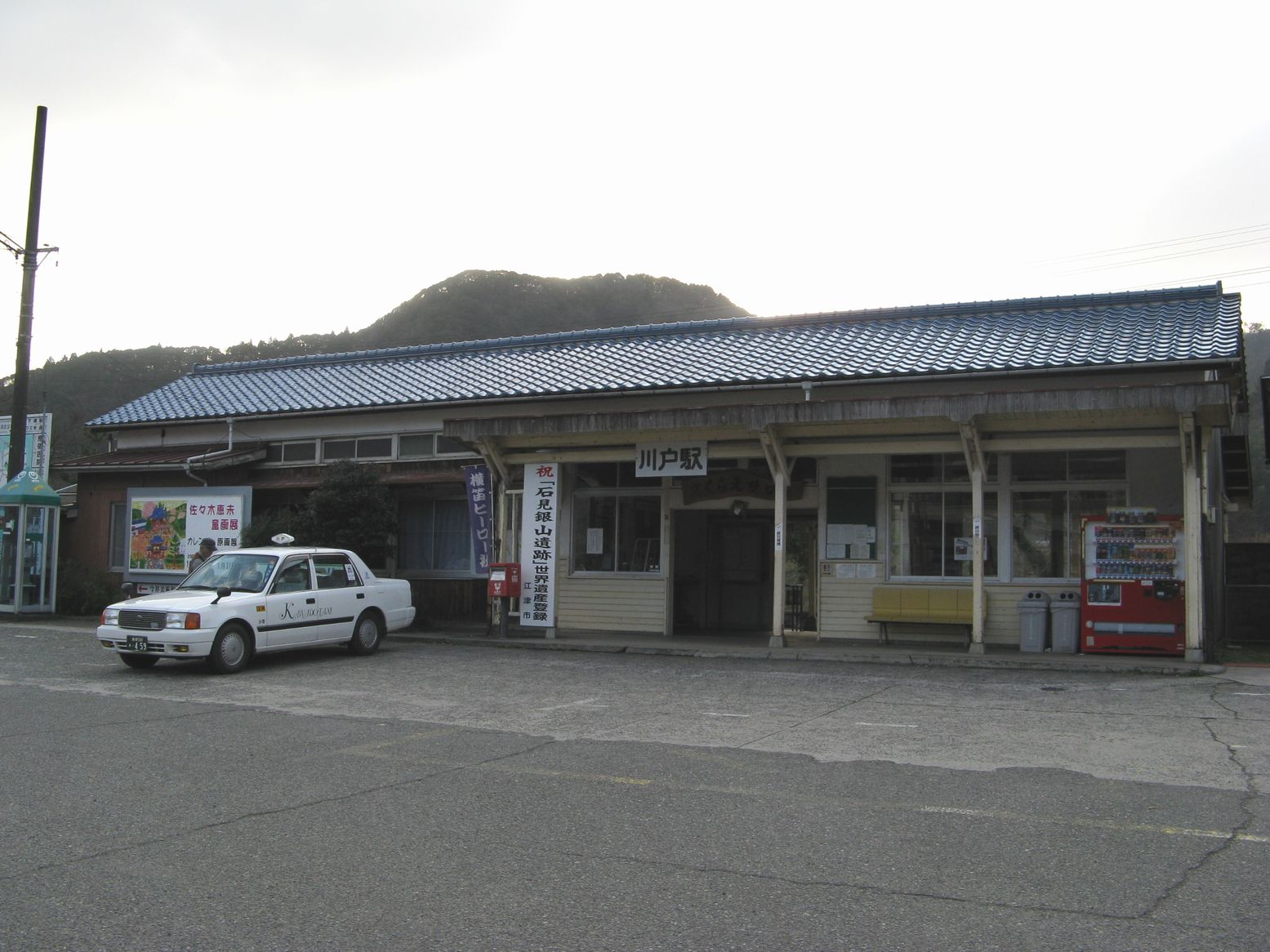
- Kawado Station in January 2008

General information
- Location: 117, Sakurae-chō Kawado, Gōtsu （島根県江津市桜江町川戸117） Shimane Prefecture; Japan
- Coordinates: 34°57′35″N 132°20′00″E
- Operator: JR West
- Line: F Sankō Line

History
- Opened: 1930
- Closed: 2018
Location
- Location within Japan

Kawado Station (川戸駅, Kawado-eki) was a railway station in Gōtsu, Shimane Prefecture, Japan, operated by West Japan Railway Company (JR West).

== Lines ==
Kawado Station was served by the 108.1 km Sankō Line from Gōtsu in Shimane Prefecture to Miyoshi in Hiroshima Prefecture, which closed on 31 March 2018.

== Adjacent stations ==
«	Service	»
Sankō Line
Kawahira	Local	Tazu

== History ==
On 16 October 2015, JR West announced that it was considering closing the Sanko Line due to poor patronage. On 29 September 2016, JR West announced that the entire line would close on 31 March 2018. The line then closed on March 31, 2018, with an event hosted by JR West.

== Surrounding area ==
- Gōnokawa River

== See also ==
- List of railway stations in Japan
