= Tazu Station =

Former railway station in Gōtsu, Japan

Tazu Station 田津駅
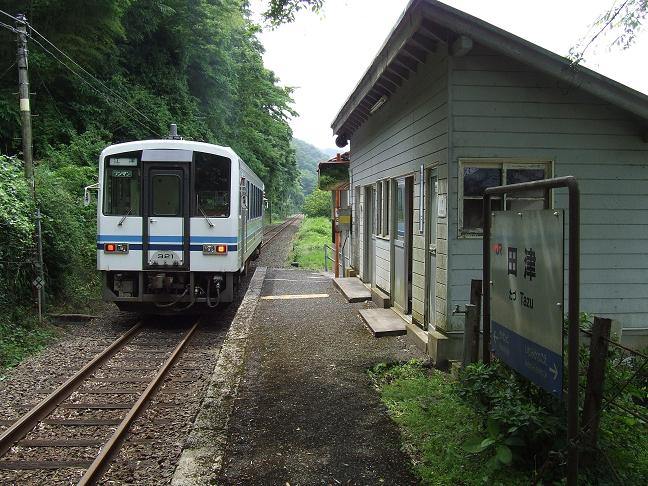
- Tazu Station platform in June 2008

General information
- Location: 1579, Sakurae-chō Tazu, Gōtsu （島根県江津市桜江町田津204） Shimane Prefecture; Japan
- Coordinates: 34°57′06″N 132°23′09″E
- Operator: JR West
- Line: F Sankō Line

History
- Opened: 1949
- Closed: 2018
Location
- Location within Japan

Tazu Station (田津駅, Tazu-eki) was a railway station in Gōtsu, Shimane Prefecture, Japan, operated by West Japan Railway Company (JR West).

== Lines ==
Tazu Station was served by the 108.1 km Sankō Line from Gōtsu in Shimane Prefecture to Miyoshi in Hiroshima Prefecture, which closed on 31 March 2018.

== Adjacent stations ==
«	Service	»
Sankō Line
Kawado	Local	Iwami-Kawagoe

== History ==
On 16 October 2015, JR West announced that it was considering closing the Sanko Line due to poor patronage. On 29 September 2016, JR West announced that the entire line would close on 31 March 2018. The line then closed on March 31, 2018, with an event hosted by JR West.

== See also ==
- List of railway stations in Japan
