= Sankō Line =

Former railway line in Japan

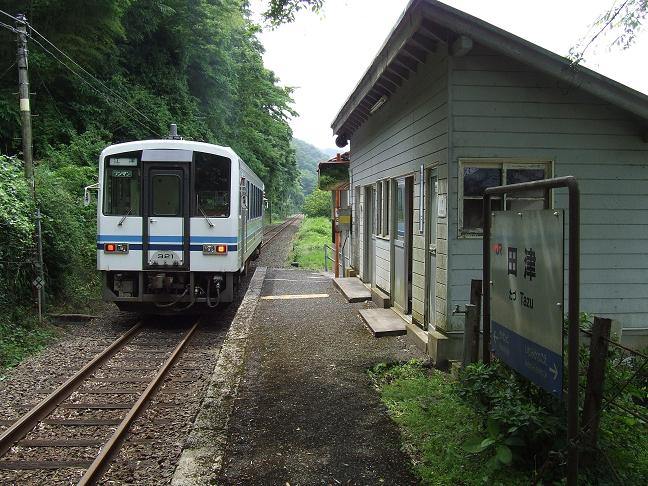
- A KiHa 120 DMU on the Sanko Line in June 2008

Overview
- Native name: 三江線
- Status: Closed
- Owner: JR West
- Locale: Shimane and Hiroshima Prefectures
- Termini: Gōtsu; Miyoshi
- Stations: 35

Service
- Type: Regional rail
- Operator(s): JR West
- Rolling stock: KiHa 120 series DMU
- Daily ridership: 50 passengers per km per day (FY2014)

History
- Opened: 1930 (completed in 1975)
- Closed: 31 March 2018

Technical
- Line length: 108.1 km (67.2 mi)
- Number of tracks: Entire line single tracked
- Character: Rural
- Track gauge: 1,067 mm (3 ft 6 in)
- Electrification: None
- Operating speed: 85 km/h (53 mph)

The Sankō Line (三江線, Sankō-sen) is a former railway line and current bus line in western Japan operated by the West Japan Railway Company (JR West). The 108.1 km (67.2 mi) line connected Gōtsu in Shimane Prefecture to Miyoshi in Hiroshima Prefecture and featured 30 tunnels. Whilst the first section opened in 1930, the line was not completed until 1975. Owing to declining patronage, the entire rail line ceased operation on 31 March 2018, to be replaced by a bus service on 1 April 2018.

== Stations ==
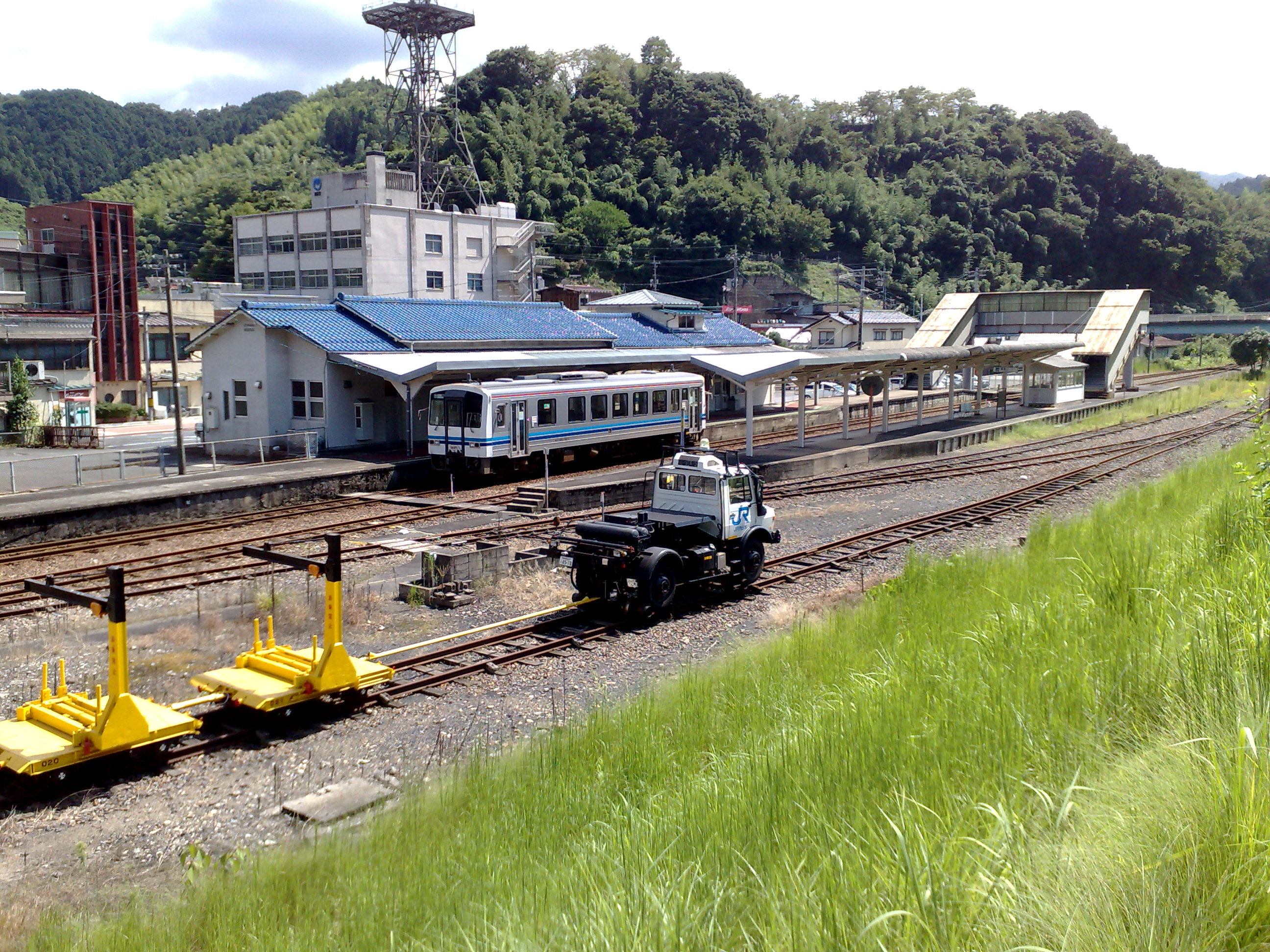
Iwami-Kawamoto Station in September 2008

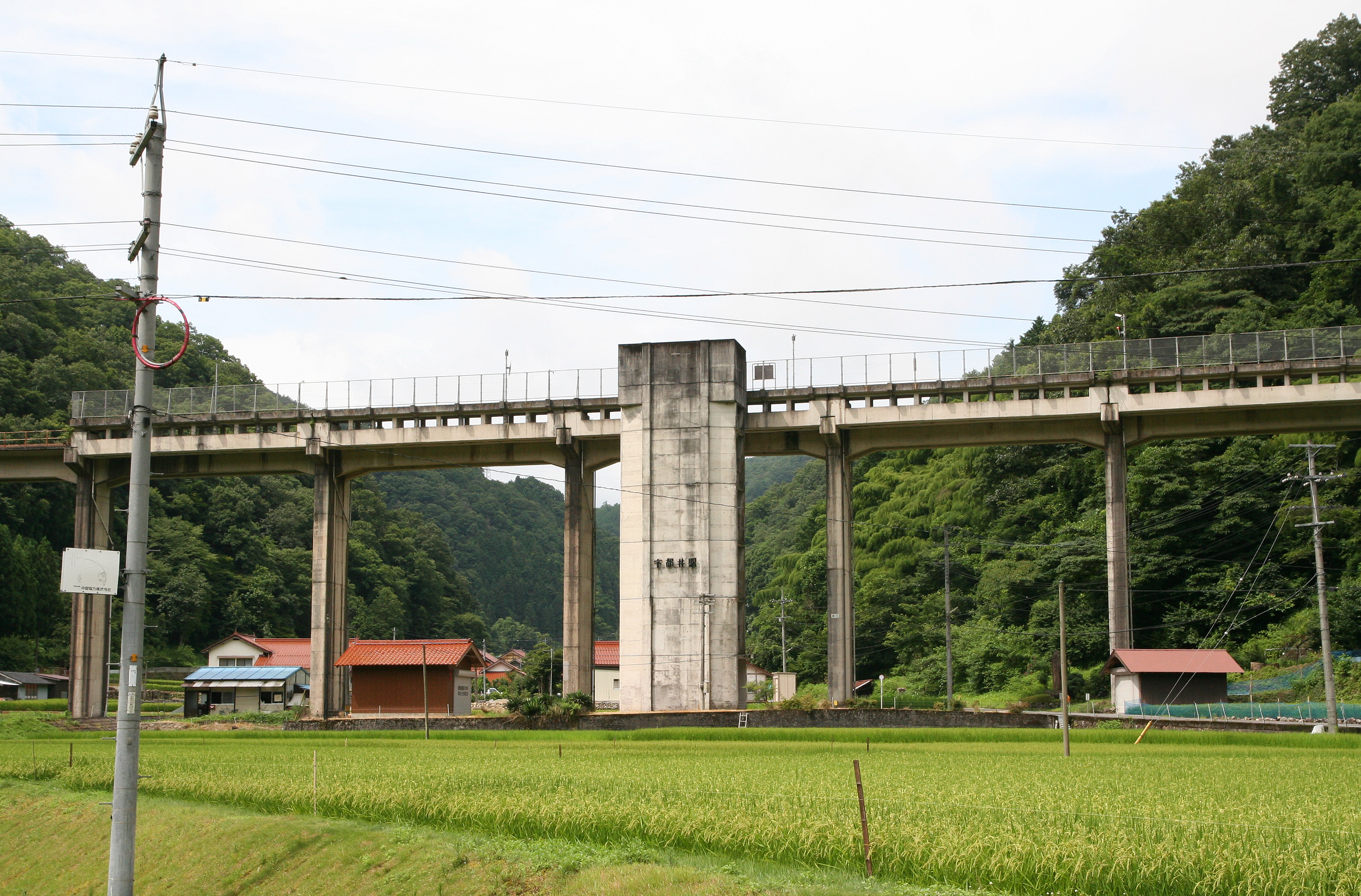
Uzui Station in July 2008

Name		Between (km)	Distance (km)	Transfers	Location	
Gōtsu	江津	-	0.0	Sanin Main Line	Gōtsu	Shimane Prefecture
Gōtsuhommachi	江津本町	1.1	1.1		Gōtsu	Shimane Prefecture
Chigane	千金	2.4	3.3		Gōtsu	Shimane Prefecture
Kawahira	川平	3.7	7.0		Gōtsu	Shimane Prefecture
Kawado	川戸	6.9	13.9		Gōtsu	Shimane Prefecture
Tazu	田津	5.4	19.3		Gōtsu	Shimane Prefecture
Iwami Kawagoe	石見川越	3.0	22.3		Gōtsu	Shimane Prefecture
Shikaga	鹿賀	3.5	25.8		Gōtsu	Shimane Prefecture
Inbara	因原	3.1	28.9		Kawamoto; Ōchi District	Shimane Prefecture
Iwami Kawamoto	石見川本	3.7	32.6		Kawamoto; Ōchi District	Shimane Prefecture
Kirohara	木路原	2.0	34.6		Kawamoto; Ōchi District	Shimane Prefecture
Take	竹	3.0	37.6		Misato; Ōchi District	Shimane Prefecture
Onbara	乙原	2.2	39.8		Misato; Ōchi District	Shimane Prefecture
Iwami Yanaze	石見簗瀬	2.9	42.7		Misato; Ōchi District	Shimane Prefecture
Akatsuka	明塚	2.3	45.0		Misato; Ōchi District	Shimane Prefecture
Kasubuchi	粕淵	3.1	48.1		Misato; Ōchi District	Shimane Prefecture
Hamahara	浜原	2.0	50.1		Misato; Ōchi District	Shimane Prefecture
Sawadani	沢谷	3.7	53.8		Misato; Ōchi District	Shimane Prefecture
Ushio	潮	5.8	59.6		Misato; Ōchi District	Shimane Prefecture
Iwami Matsubara	石見松原	3.2	62.8		Misato; Ōchi District	Shimane Prefecture
Iwami Tsuga	石見都賀	5.6	68.4		Misato; Ōchi District	Shimane Prefecture
Uzui	宇都井	6.4	74.8		Ōnan, Ōchi	Shimane Prefecture
Ikawashi	伊賀和志	3.4	78.2		Miyoshi, Hiroshima	
Kuchiba	口羽	1.5	79.7		Ōnan, Ōchi, Shimane	
Gōbira	江平	3.6	83.2		Ōnan, Ōchi, Shimane	
Sakugiguchi	作木口	1.7	84.9		Ōnan, Ōchi, Shimane	
Kōyodo	香淀	4.8	89.7		Miyoshi	Hiroshima
Shikijiki	式敷	3.6	93.3		Akitakata	Hiroshima
Nobuki	信木	1.8	95.1		Akitakata	Hiroshima
Tokorogi	所木	1.9	97.0		Akitakata	Hiroshima
Funasa	船佐	1.4	98.4		Akitakata	Hiroshima
Nagatani	長谷	2.2	100.6		Miyoshi	Hiroshima
Awaya	粟屋	2.5	103.1		Miyoshi	Hiroshima
Ozekiyama	尾関山	3.0	106.1		Miyoshi	Hiroshima
Miyoshi	三次	2.0	108.1	Geibi Line; Fukuen Line	Miyoshi	Hiroshima

== Rolling stock ==
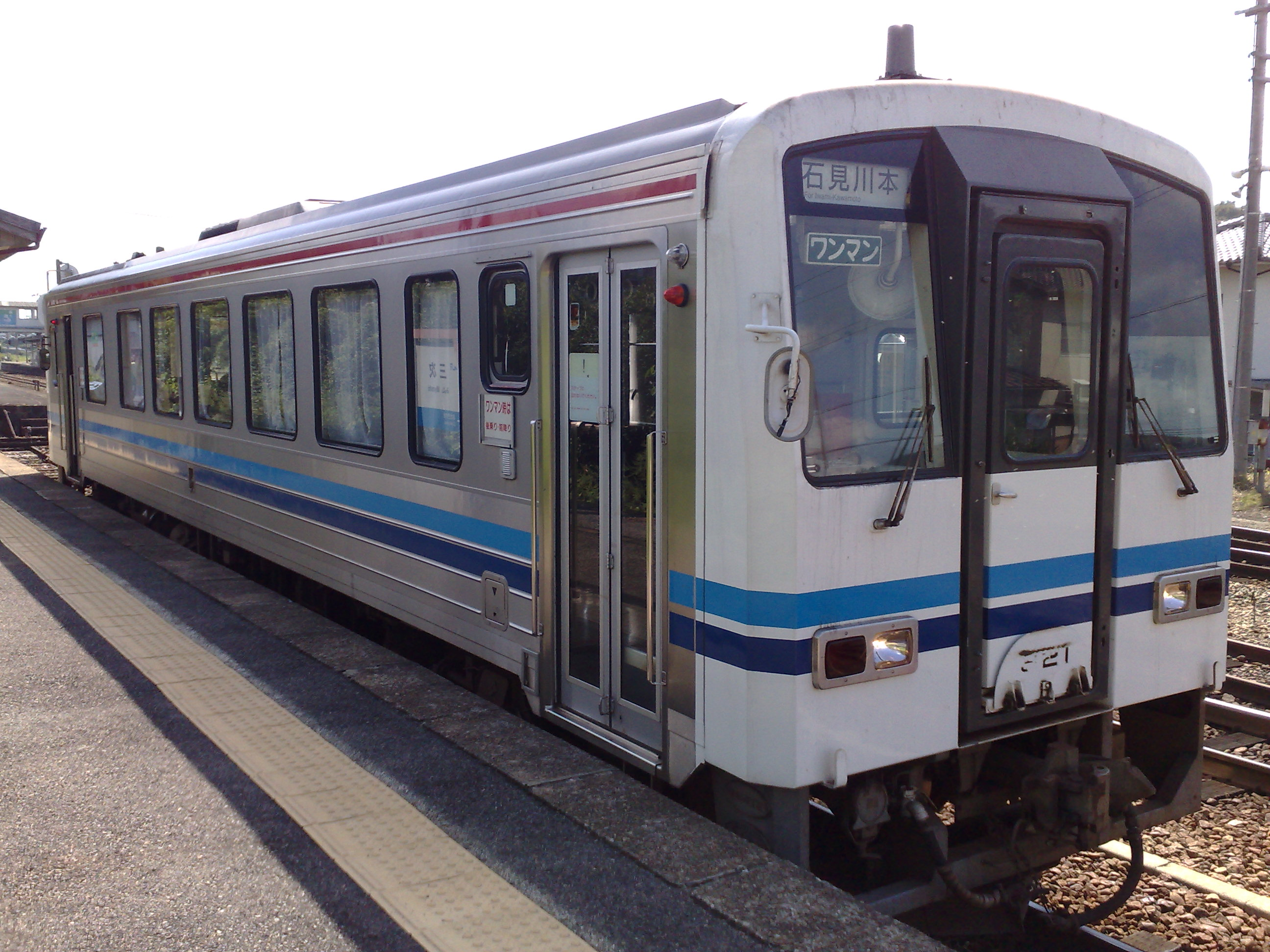
A JR West KiHa 120 diesel car in September 2008

Services on the line were operated by JR West single-car KiHa 120 diesel multiple units.

== History ==
The Gotsu to Kawado section opened in 1930, and the line was extended progressively east, reaching Hamahara in 1937. The Miyoshi to Shikijiki section opened in 1955 as a passenger-only line, and was extended to Kuchiba in 1963, and Hamahara in 1975, completing the line.

=== Closure ===
On 16 October 2015, JR West announced that it was considering closing the line owing to poor patronage, and was in discussion with the two prefectures served by the line, Shimane and Hiroshima, as well as other municipalities served, concerning future plans. In fiscal 2014, the line carried an average of 50 passengers per km per day, compared to 458 per km per day in 1987. On 29 September 2016, JR West announced that the entire line would close on 31 March 2018. The line then closed on March 31, 2018, with an event hosted by JR West.

== See also ==
- List of railway lines in Japan
