= Gōtsu, Shimane =

Gōtsu 江津市
- City
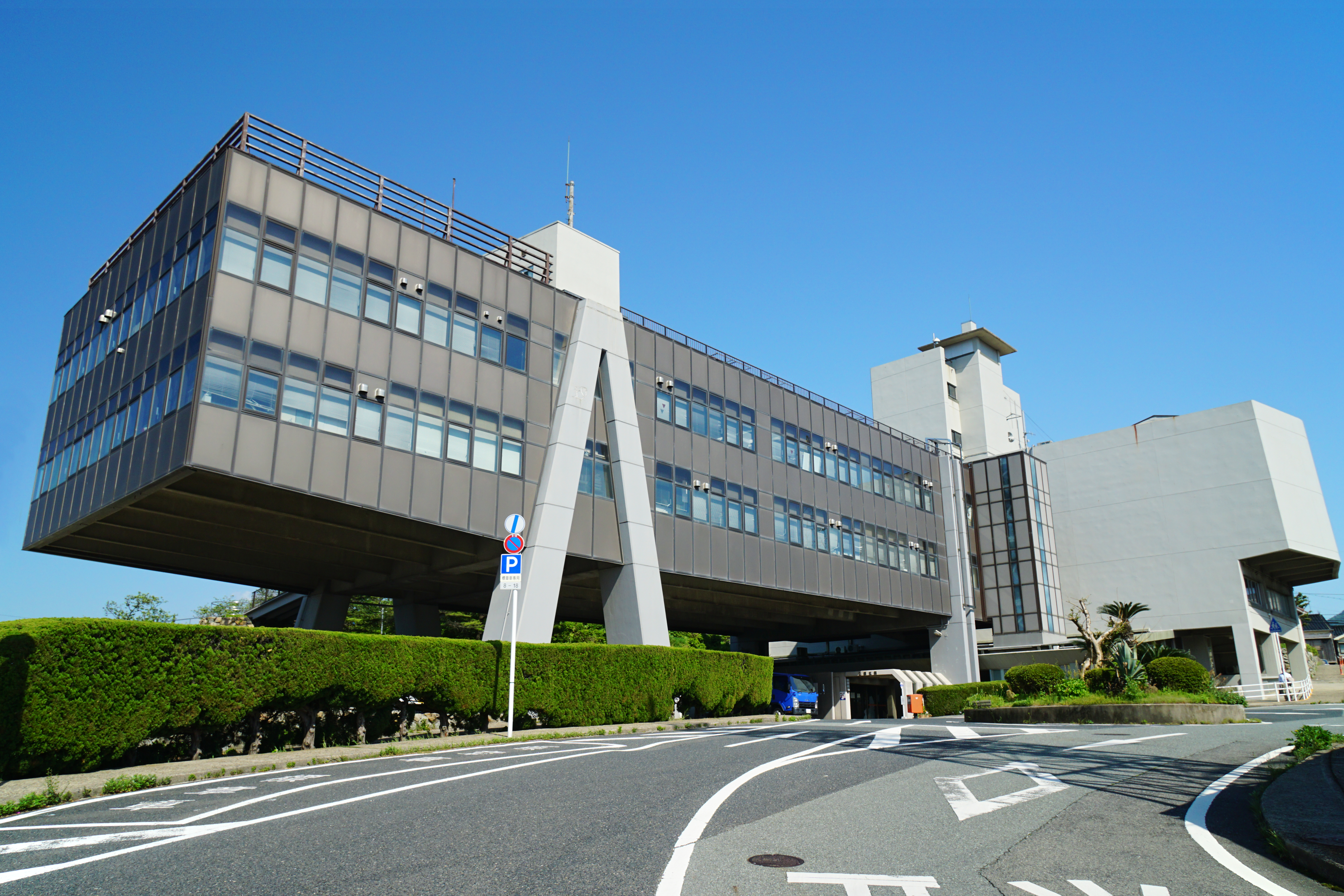
- Gōtsu City Hall

- Flag Emblem
- Interactive map of Gōtsu
- Location in Japan
- Coordinates: 35°0′42″N 132°13′04″E
- Country: Japan
- Region: Chūgoku (San'in)
- Prefecture: Shimane

Government
  - Mayor: Nakamura Ataru

Area
  - Total: 268.24 km^{2} (103.57 sq mi)

Population (June 30, 2023)
  - Total: 21,913
  - Density: 81.692/km^{2} (211.58/sq mi)
- Time zone: UTC+09:00 (JST)
- City hall address: 1016-4 Gōtsu-chō, Gōtsu-shi, Shimane-ken 695-8501
- Website: Official website
- Symbols
- Flower: Azalea
- Tree: Black Pine

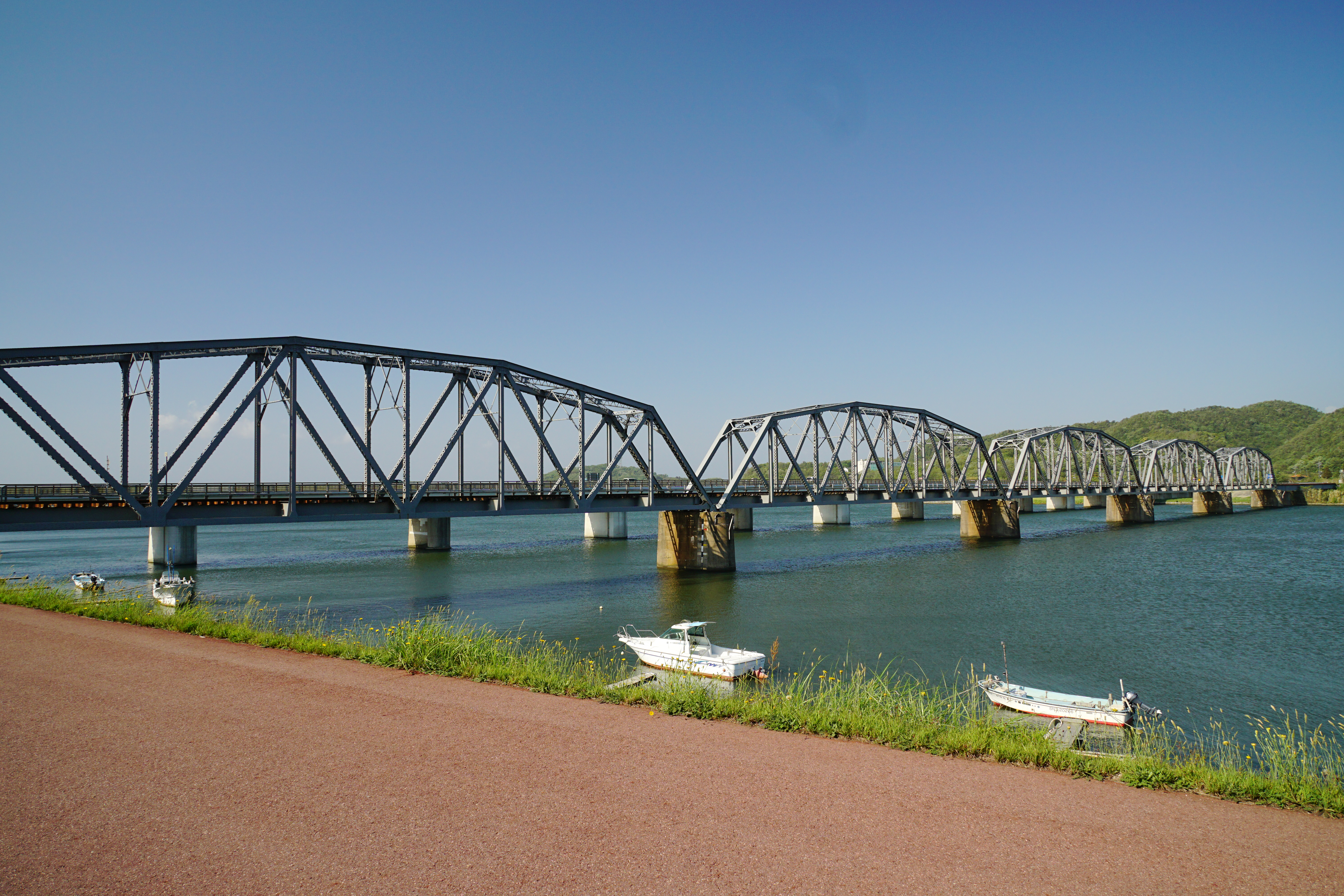
Gōnokawa River

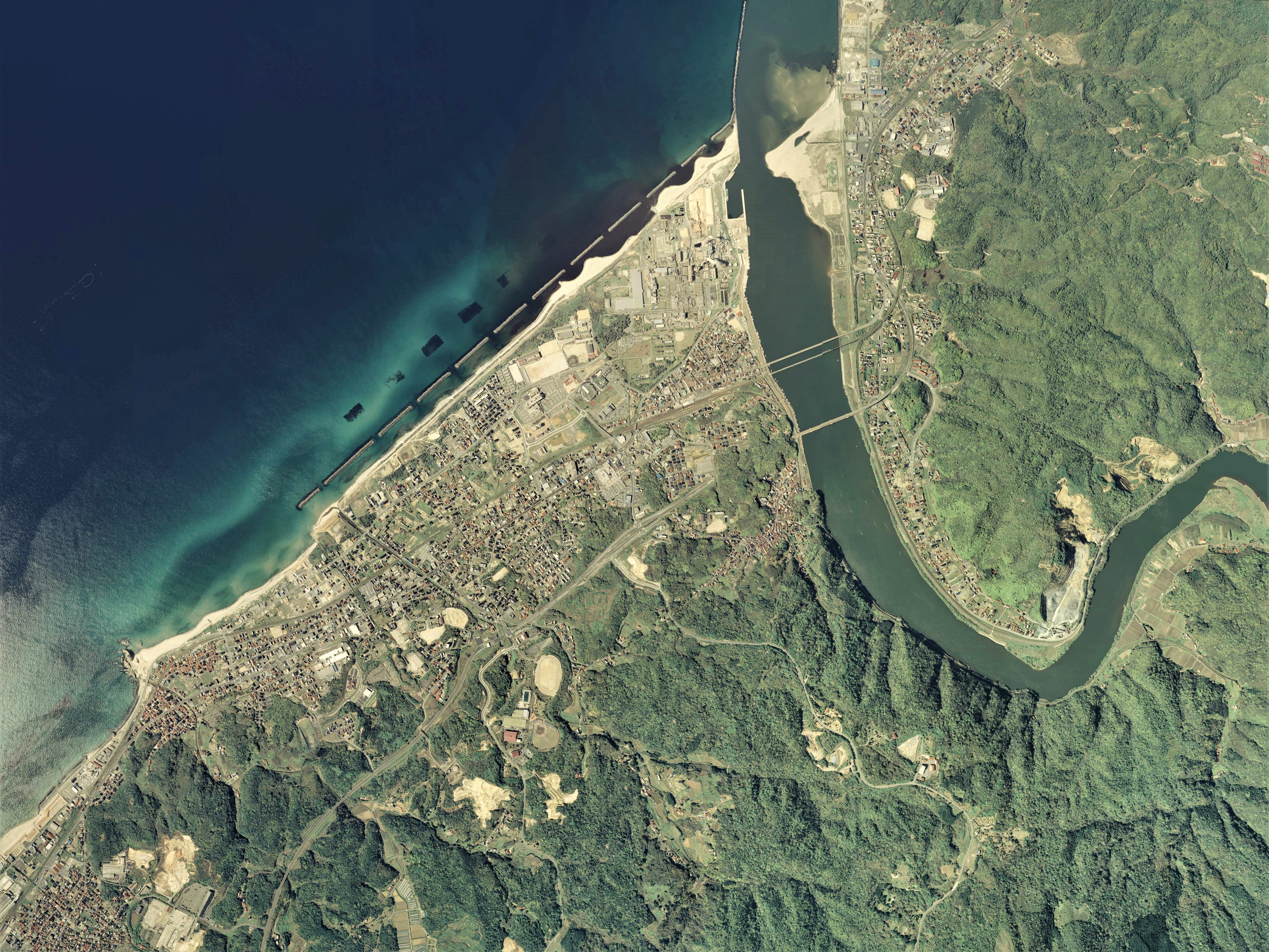
Aerial Photograph of Gōtsu City

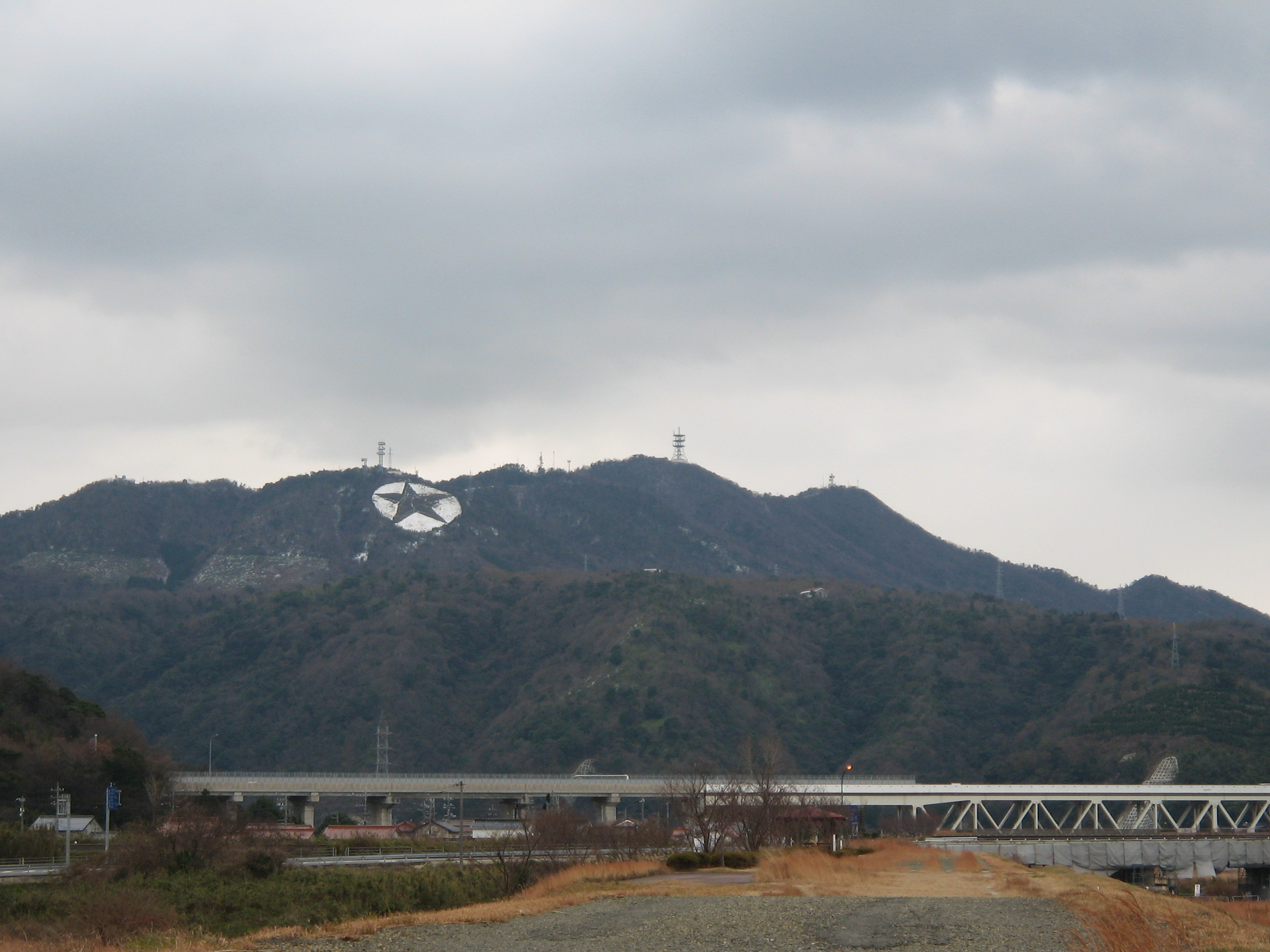
Hoshitaka Mountain

Gōtsu (江津市, Gōtsu-shi) is a city located in Shimane Prefecture, Japan. As of June 30, 2023, the city had an estimated population of 21,913 in 11196 households and a population density of 82 persons per km^{2}. The total area of the city is 268.24 square kilometres (103.57 sq mi). It is the smallest and least populous city in Shimane Prefecture.

== Geography ==
Gōtsu is located in the western part of Shimane Prefecture. It consists of coastal terraces in the north that extend from east to west, and hilly areas in the south.The Gōnokawa River, one of the few rivers that runs through the Chugoku Mountains and the largest river in the Chugoku region, flows into the Sea of Japan in this city. Approximately 79% of Gōtsu's land are is forested. It is said to be the city with the longest travel time from Tokyo, and is advertised as "the furthest city from Tokyo", a point which has been featured in high school "Geography A" textbooks.

Overlooking Gōtsu City is Hoshitaka Mountain, or "Star Mountain", so named for the star pattern carved into the face of the mountain. According to Gōtsu legend, the star was formed by a meteor that had fallen many years ago. A piece of this meteor was saved, and a shrine was built at the foot of the mountain to honor the event. In the winter, snowfall on the mountain creates a beautiful star-shaped pattern, visible from anywhere in the city. In the spring, white azaleas bloom to form a white star, while the area bordering the star remains green. In the summer, in celebration of the Japanese Obon Festival, the star is lit up at night.

== Neighboring municipalities ==
Shimane Prefecture

- Hamada
- Ōda
- Ōnan
- Kawamoto

=== Climate ===
Gōtsu has a humid subtropical climate (Köppen Cfa) characterized by warm summers and cool winters with light to no snowfall. The average annual temperature in Gōtsu is 15.4 °C. The average annual rainfall is 1681 mm with September as the wettest month. The temperatures are highest on average in August, at around 26.4 °C, and lowest in January, at around 5.2 °C.

== Demographics ==
Per Japanese census data, the population of Gōtsu has been decreasing.

Historical population
Year	Pop.	±%
1970	36,811	—
1980	32,931	−10.5%
1990	32,937	+0.0%
2000	30,740	−6.7%
2010	27,774	−9.6%
2020	24,468	−11.9%

== History ==
The area of Gōtsu was part of ancient Iwami Province, and prospered as an important point for shipping and shipping on the Sea of Japan since ancient times. Burial mounds from the middle third of the Middle Yayoi period were discovered in Gōtsu in 1973. The area was mostly controlled as tenryō under direct control of the Tokugawa shogunate in the Edo period. After the Meiji restoration, the village of Gōtsu was established on April 1, 1889 with the creation of the modern municipalities system.

On May 27, 1905, the Russian transport vessel Irtysh of the Russian Baltic Fleet sustained damaged from Japanese warships in the waters off Tsushima Island. After drifting to within 2 km of the coast Gōtsu's Waki district the ship began to sink. Gōtsu residents rescued over 200 Russian soldiers. The event has been memorialized since the following year and is now known as the Russia festival. In 1959, the former chairman of the Japan Shipbuilding Industry Foundation Ryoichi Sasakawa erected a 2.9-meter-tall (9.5 ft) cenotaph.

Gōtsu was elevated to town status on July 1, 1914. On April 1, 1954, modern day Gōtsu City was formed through the merging of numerous villages. On October 1, 2004, the town of Sakurae (from Ōchi District) was merged into Gōtsu.

== Government ==
Gōtsu has a mayor-council form of government with a directly elected mayor and a unicameral city council of 16 members. Gōtsu contributes one member to the Shimane Prefectural Assembly. In terms of national politics, the city is part of the Shimane 2nd district of the lower house of the Diet of Japan.

=== Mayor of Gōtsu City ===
On May 29, 2022, Ataru Nakamura won the mayoral election in Gōtsu City. At 43 years old, Nakamura became the youngest mayor out of eight cities in Shimane Prefecture. Before becoming mayor, Nakamura worked at a welfare facility for the elderly and served as secretary to Japanese house of representative member Wataru Takeshita.

Mayors of Gōtsu City, Shimane Prefecture
Name (Rōmaji)	Name (Kanji)	Time of Assumption	Notes
Yutaka Iida	飯田豊	May 1, 1954	First mayor of Gōtsu City.
Sadayoshi Chiyonobe	千代延定良	April, 1958	Gōtsu City Hall A new city hall and civic center were completed during his time in office. He died suddenly in June, 1962.
Tatsuo Fujita	藤田龍夫	July, 1962	Gōnokawa River is designated as a first class river.
Nobumasa Okada	岡田信正	July, 1967	In July, 1972, there was a torrential rain whose damages exceeded 3.2 billion yen. In November, 1973, the Gōtsu Citizen Charter, city tree, and city flower were established. In April, 1974, the Gōtsu City Library was opened.
Takao Sasaki	佐々木隆夫	July, 1974	In April, 1980, the Gōtsu Municipal Baseball Stadium was completed. In December, 1981, the Gōtsu Civic Gymnasium was completed.
Tomohiro Fukuhara	福原友宏	July, 1982	In July, 1983, there was a torrential rain with total damages exceeding 8.4 billion yen. In August, 1984, the first Gōnokawa Festival was held.
Kazuhiro Ushio	牛尾一弘	July, 1990	In April, 1993, the Shimane Vocational Ability Development Junior College opened. In April, 1995, the Gōtsu City General Civic Center was completed.
Masuji Tanaka	田中増次	July, 1998	In March, 2002, the Merger Promotion Council with Sakurae Town was established. On October 1, 2004, Sakurae City, Ochi-Gun was incorporated into Gōtsu City. A new city emblem and citizen charter are created. In August, 2013, there is a heavy rain disaster with the largest amount of rainfall in recorded history.
Osamu Yamashita	山下修	July, 2014	In May, 2021, there was a government building relocation.
Ataru Nakamura	中村中	July 16, 2022	With his election he became the youngest mayor in Shimane Prefecture.

== Economy ==
The main industries in Gōtsu are agriculture and commercial fishing, As a local industry, the city has long been known as the center of the production of Sekishu roof tiles, ceramics (Iwami ware) and clay and stone products, which account for the largest shipment value of manufactured goods. Due to good transportation connections and low land prices, companies such as biomass power plants and resin processing manufacturers have also entered the market.

== Education ==
Gōtsu has seven public elementary school and four public junior high schools operated by the city government, and two public high schools operated by the Shimane Prefectural Board of Education. There are also two private high schools.

At Shimane Vocational Ability Development Junior College (島根職業能力開発短期大学校), engineering and technician training is offered.

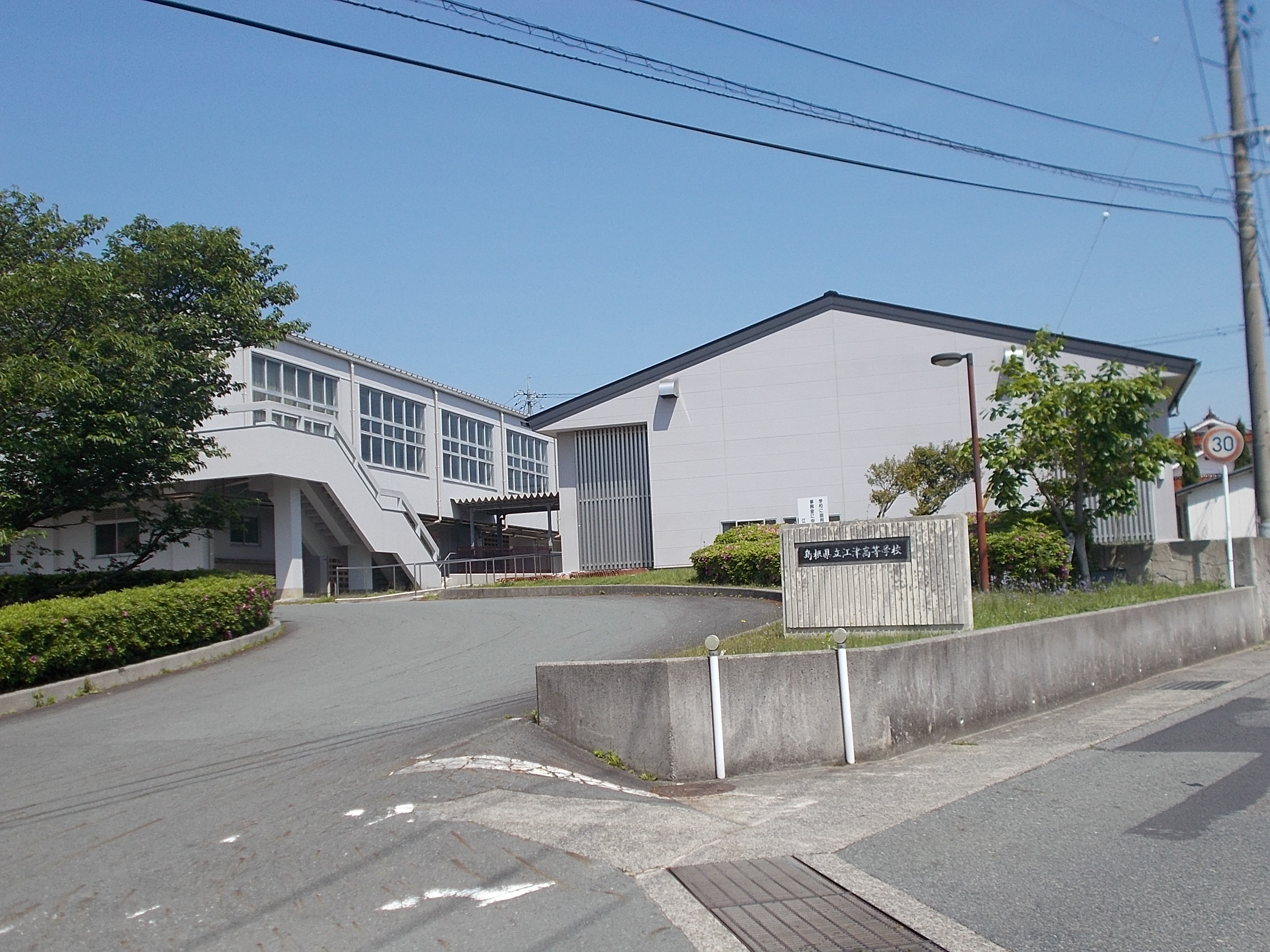
Shimane Prefectural Gotsu High School

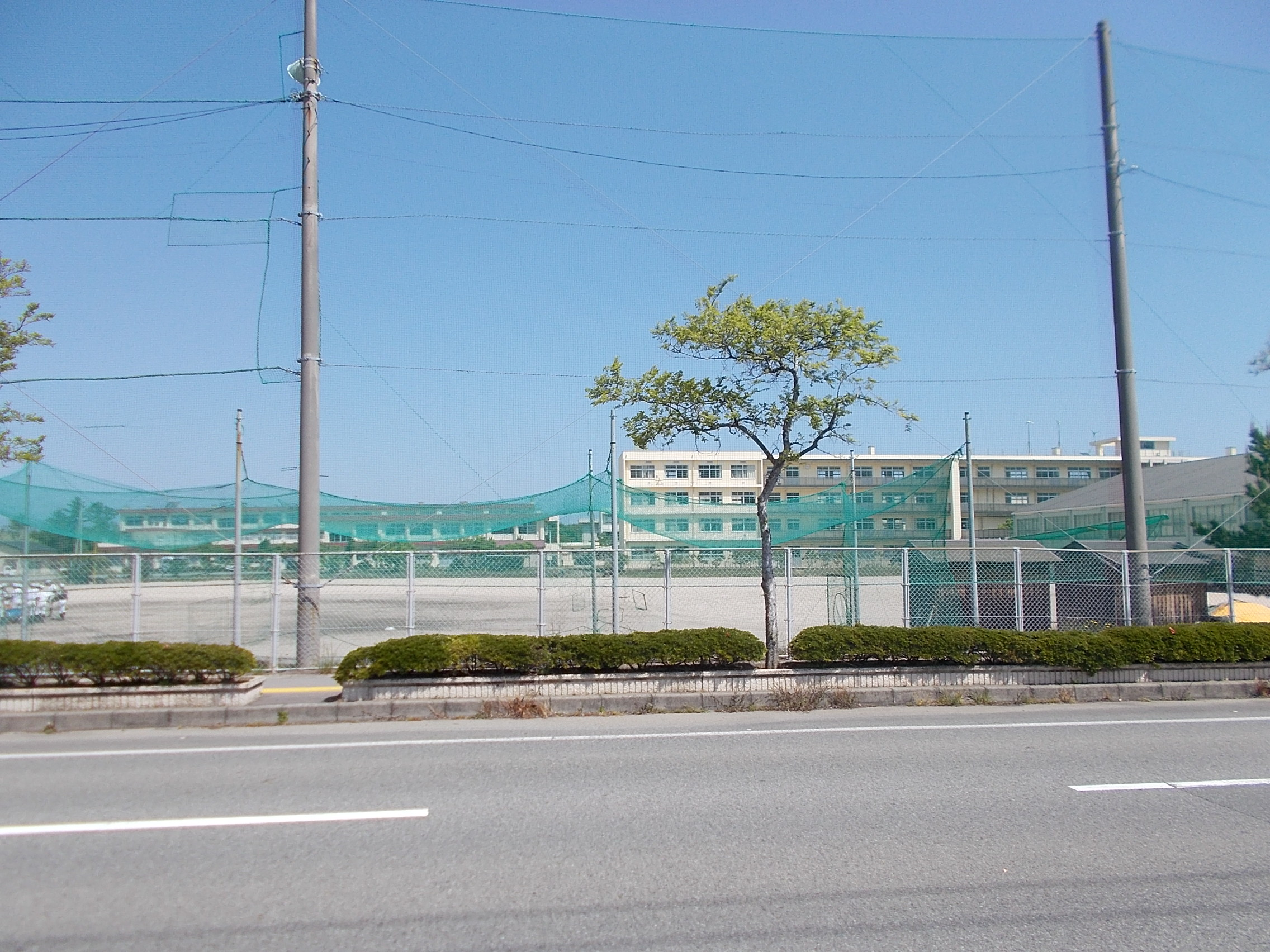
Shimane Prefectural Gotsu Technical High School

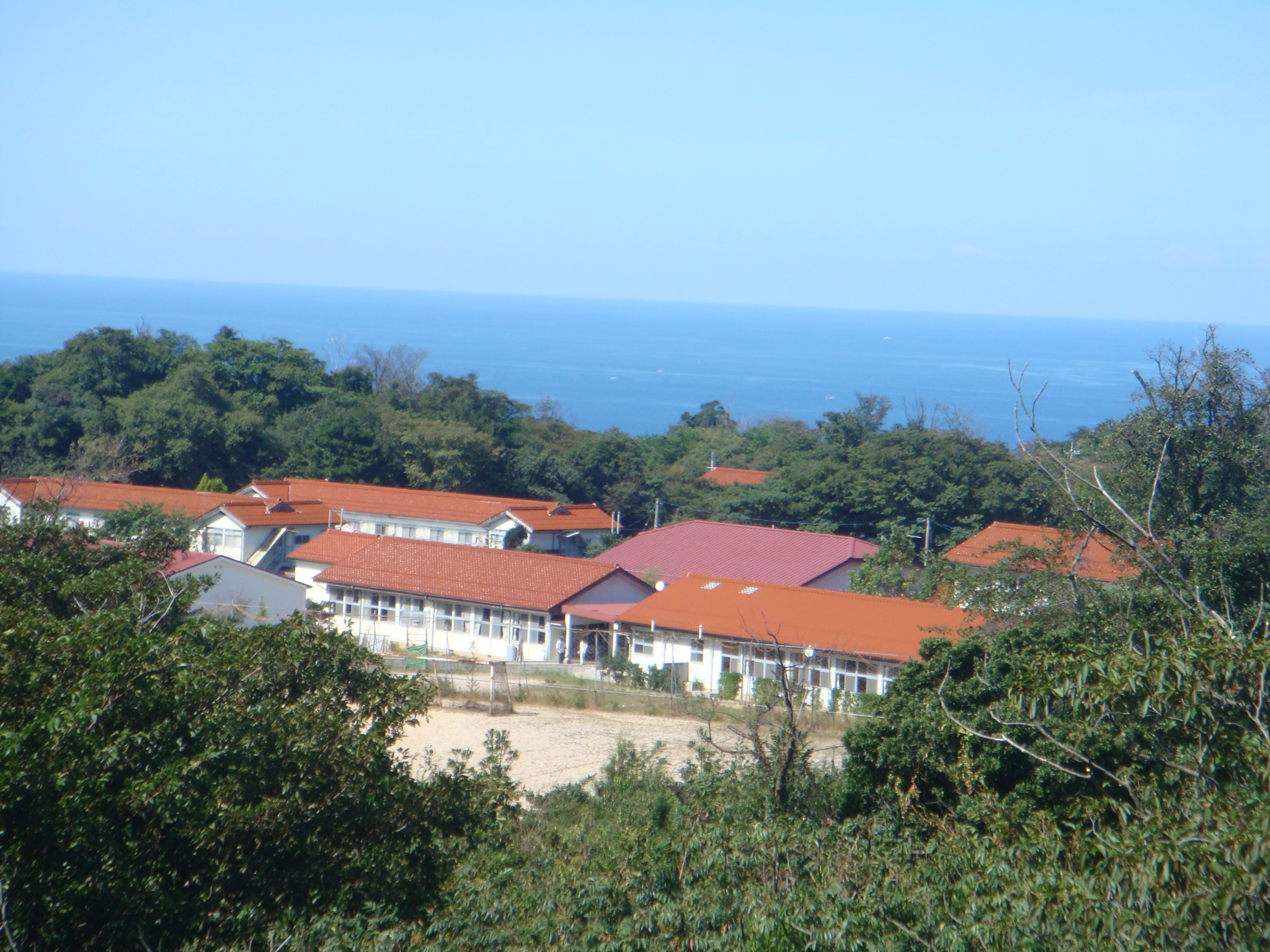
Christian Aishin High School

== Transportation ==
=== Railway ===
JR West (JR West) – San'in Main Line

- Hashi – Uyagawa – Tsunozu – Gōtsu – Asari – Kuromatsu

JR West (JR West) – Sankō Line Closed on April 1, 2018

- Gōtsu – Gōtsuhommachi – Chigane – Kawahira – Kawado – Tazu – Iwami-Kawagoe – Shikaga

=== Highways ===
- San'in Expressway
- National Route 9
- National Route 186
- National Route 261

== Sister cities ==
- Corona, California, United States, friendship city

== Local attractions ==
=== Arifuku Onsen ===
Arifuku Onsen (有福温泉 (ありふくおんせん)) is a hot spring in Gōtsu City said to have been founded more than 1,350 years ago by a monk named Hōdō (法道 (ほうどう)).

=== Ceramic and clay goods ===
Iwami Ware (石見焼 (いわみやき)) is a type of Japanese pottery that is made in the Iwami region and is centered in Gōtsu City. Iwami Ware was introduced to Gōtsu City in 1763. Ceramic and clay goods are considered to be local specialties. Ceramic practices have developed throughout Gōtsu City's history.

=== Other ===
Sekishuken Laboratory in Gōtsu researches the history of the Sekishuken breed of dogs. The ancestor of all living Shiba Inu, Ishi, was from the Sekishuken breed, indigenous to western Shimane.

== Notable people from Gōtsu ==
- Shūe Matsubayashi, movie director
- Tsubasa Oya, former soccer player
- Toshio Shimada, politician
- Masashi Tanaka, manga artist
