= Kawamoto, Shimane =

Kawamoto 川本町
- Town
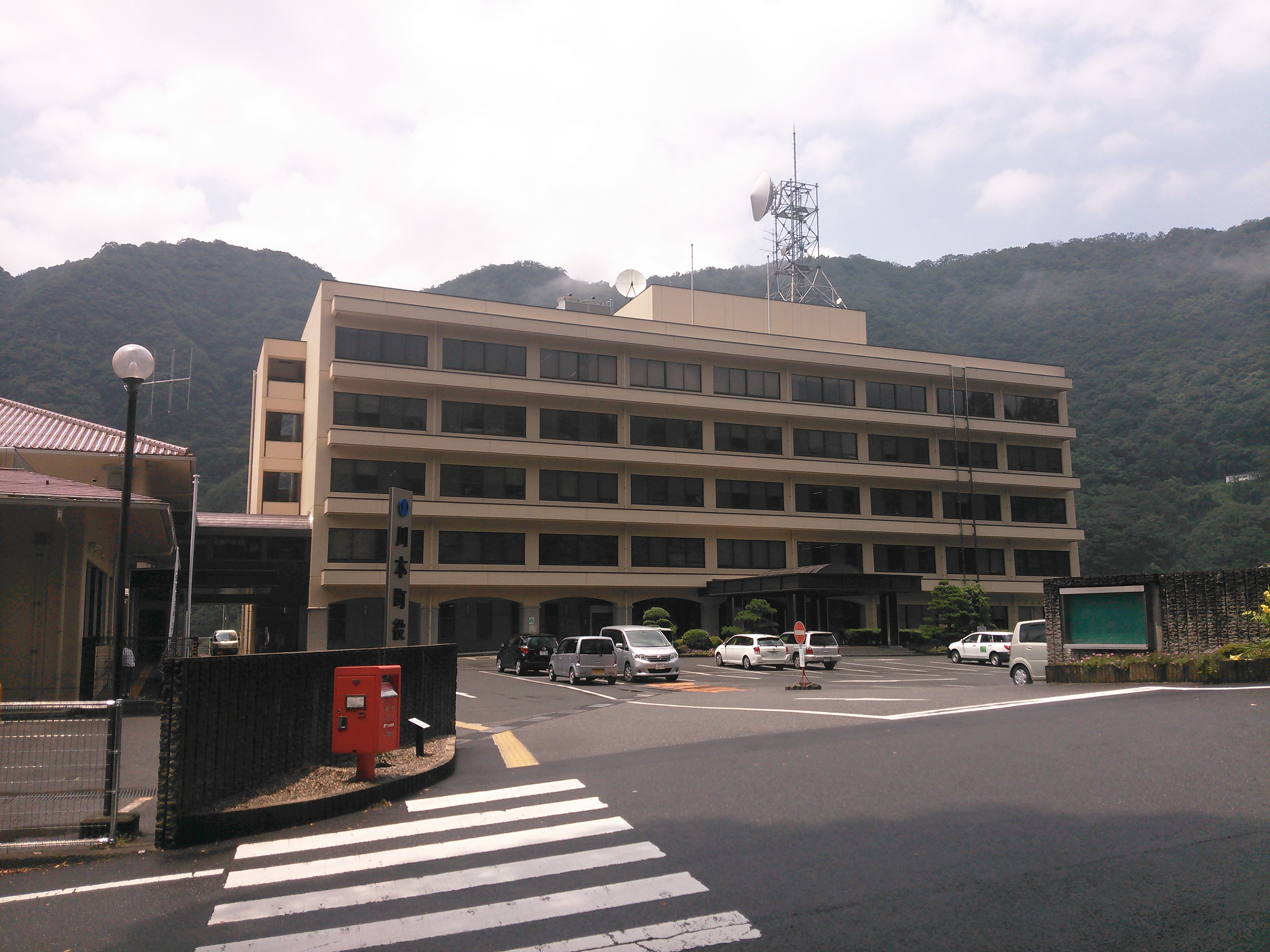
- Kawamoto town hall

- Flag Emblem
- Interactive map of Kawamoto
- Location in Japan
- Coordinates: 34°59′39″N 132°29′44″E
- Country: Japan
- Region: Chūgoku; San'in
- Prefecture: Shimane
- District: Ōchi

Area
  - Total: 106.43 km^{2} (41.09 sq mi)

Population (July 31, 2023)
  - Total: 3,051
  - Density: 28.67/km^{2} (74.25/sq mi)
- Time zone: UTC+09:00 (JST)
- City hall address: 545-1 Kawamoto, Kawamoto-cho, Ochi-gun, Shimane-ken 696-8501
- Climate: Cfa
- Website: Official website
- Symbols
- Flower: Rhododendron indicum
- Tree: Maple

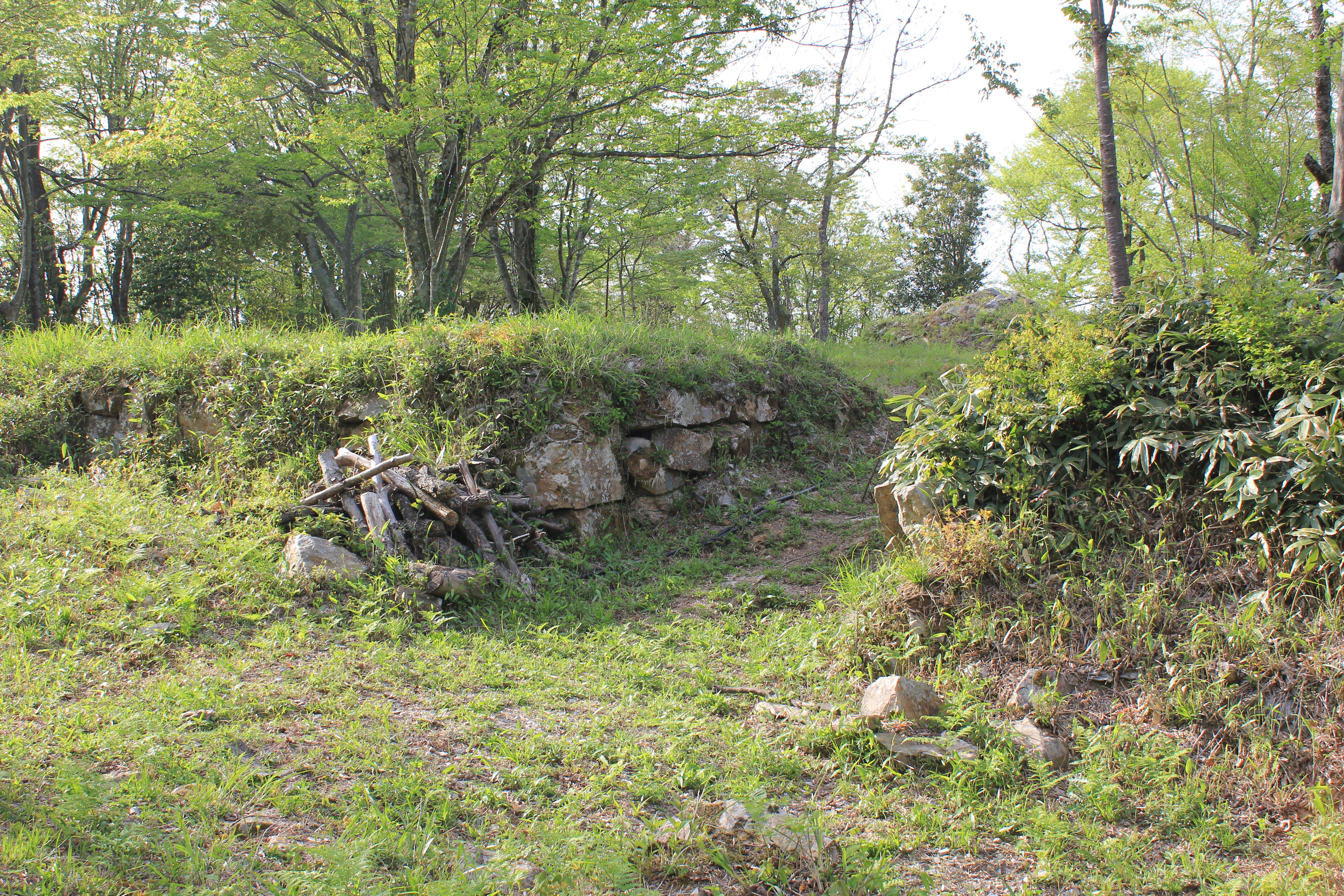
Ruins of Iwami Maruyama Castle

Kawamoto (川本町, Kawamoto-machi) is a town located in Ōchi District, Shimane Prefecture, Japan. As of 31 July 2023, the town had an estimated population of 3,051 in 1611 households and a population density of 29 persons per km^{2}. The total area of the town is 106.43 square kilometres (41.09 sq mi).

== Geography ==
Kawamoto is located in the Chugoku Mountains of central Shimane Prefecture.

=== Neighboring municipalities ===
Shimane Prefecture

- Gōtsu
- Misato
- Ōda
- Ōnan

=== Climate ===
Kawamoto has a humid subtropical climate (Köppen climate classification Cfa) with very warm summers and cool winters. Precipitation is abundant throughout the year. The average annual temperature in Kawamoto is 13.8 °C (56.8 °F). The average annual rainfall is 1,924.1 mm (75.75 in) with July as the wettest month. The temperatures are highest on average in August, at around 25.7 °C (78.3 °F), and lowest in January, at around 2.7 °C (36.9 °F). The highest temperature ever recorded in Kawamoto was 39.2 °C (102.6 °F) on 30 July 2025; the coldest temperature ever recorded was −10.1 °C (13.8 °F) on 28 February 1981.

Climate data for Kawamoto (1991−2020 normals, extremes 1978−present)
Month	Jan	Feb	Mar	Apr	May	Jun	Jul	Aug	Sep	Oct	Nov	Dec	Year
Record high °C (°F)	18.9 (66.0)	22.9 (73.2)	26.3 (79.3)	32.1 (89.8)	33.8 (92.8)	36.3 (97.3)	39.2 (102.6)	38.8 (101.8)	37.2 (99.0)	31.4 (88.5)	26.8 (80.2)	23.8 (74.8)	39.2 (102.6)
Mean daily maximum °C (°F)	7.1 (44.8)	8.6 (47.5)	13.0 (55.4)	19.0 (66.2)	23.9 (75.0)	26.8 (80.2)	30.1 (86.2)	31.6 (88.9)	27.0 (80.6)	21.5 (70.7)	15.8 (60.4)	9.6 (49.3)	19.5 (67.1)
Daily mean °C (°F)	2.7 (36.9)	3.5 (38.3)	6.7 (44.1)	12.1 (53.8)	17.0 (62.6)	20.9 (69.6)	24.9 (76.8)	25.7 (78.3)	21.4 (70.5)	15.4 (59.7)	10.0 (50.0)	4.9 (40.8)	13.8 (56.8)
Mean daily minimum °C (°F)	−0.6 (30.9)	−0.6 (30.9)	1.4 (34.5)	5.8 (42.4)	10.9 (51.6)	16.3 (61.3)	21.1 (70.0)	21.8 (71.2)	17.5 (63.5)	11.1 (52.0)	5.7 (42.3)	1.5 (34.7)	9.3 (48.8)
Record low °C (°F)	−6.9 (19.6)	−10.1 (13.8)	−5.4 (22.3)	−2.8 (27.0)	0.2 (32.4)	6.8 (44.2)	11.5 (52.7)	13.8 (56.8)	5.8 (42.4)	1.4 (34.5)	−1.6 (29.1)	−5.2 (22.6)	−10.1 (13.8)
Average precipitation mm (inches)	147.2 (5.80)	122.1 (4.81)	139.0 (5.47)	127.3 (5.01)	145.9 (5.74)	206.3 (8.12)	266.0 (10.47)	169.5 (6.67)	217.4 (8.56)	113.8 (4.48)	110.3 (4.34)	157.0 (6.18)	1,924.1 (75.75)
Average precipitation days (≥ 1.0 mm)	17.7	14.8	14.1	11.0	9.9	12.2	12.5	10.8	11.4	9.8	12.2	16.7	153.1
Mean monthly sunshine hours	61.4	81.9	135.5	178.8	198.4	145.7	156.3	188.9	140.2	146.7	108.7	69.0	1,619.5
Source: Japan Meteorological Agency

=== Demographics ===
Per Japanese census data, the population of Kawamoto in 2020 was 3,248 people. Kawamoto has been conducting censuses since 1960.

Historical population
Year	Pop.	±%
1960	9,632	—
1965	8,507	−11.7%
1970	7,213	−15.2%
1975	6,803	−5.7%
1980	6,303	−7.3%
1985	6,123	−2.9%
1990	5,512	−10.0%
1995	5,099	−7.5%
2000	4,784	−6.2%
2005	4,324	−9.6%
2010	3,900	−9.8%
2015	3,442	−11.7%
2020	3,248	−5.6%
Kawamoto population statistics

== History ==
The area of Kawamoto was part of ancient Iwami Province. During the Edo Period, the area was tenryō territory under the direction control of the Tokugawa shogunate due to its proximity to the Iwami Ginzan Silver Mine. After the Meiji restoration, the village of Kawamoto was established within Ōchi District, Shimane on April 1, 1889, with the creation of the modern municipalities system. Kawamoto was raised to town status on April 1, 1927.

== Government ==
Kawamoto has a mayor-council form of government with a directly elected mayor and a unicameral town council of eight members. Kawamoto, collectively with the towns of Ōnan and Misato, contributes one member to the Shimane Prefectural Assembly. In terms of national politics, the town is part of the Shimane 2nd district of the lower house of the Diet of Japan.

== Economy ==
Kawamoto is a very rural area, with an economy based on agriculture.

== Education ==
Kawamoto has one public elementary school and one public junior high school operated by the town government, and one public high school operated by the Shimane Prefectural Board of Education.

== Transportation ==
=== Railway ===
Following the closure of the JR West Sankō Line on April 1, 2018, Kawamoto no longer has any passenger railway service. The nearest train station is Ōda Station on the JR West San'in Main Line.

JR West - Sankō Line

- Inbara - Iwami Kawamoto - Kirohara

=== Highways ===
- National Route 261
