= Sakurae, Shimane =

Dissolved municipality in Shimane prefecture, Japan

Sakurae (桜江町, Sakurae-chō) was a town located in Ōchi District, Shimane Prefecture, Japan.

== Population ==
As of 2003, the town had an estimated population of 3,437 and a density of 31.22 persons per km^{2}. The total area was 110.10 km^{2}.

== History ==
On October 1, 2004, Sakurae was merged into the expanded city of Gōtsu.
