= Awaya Station =

Former railway station in Miyoshi, Hiroshima prefecture, Japan

Awaya Station 粟屋駅
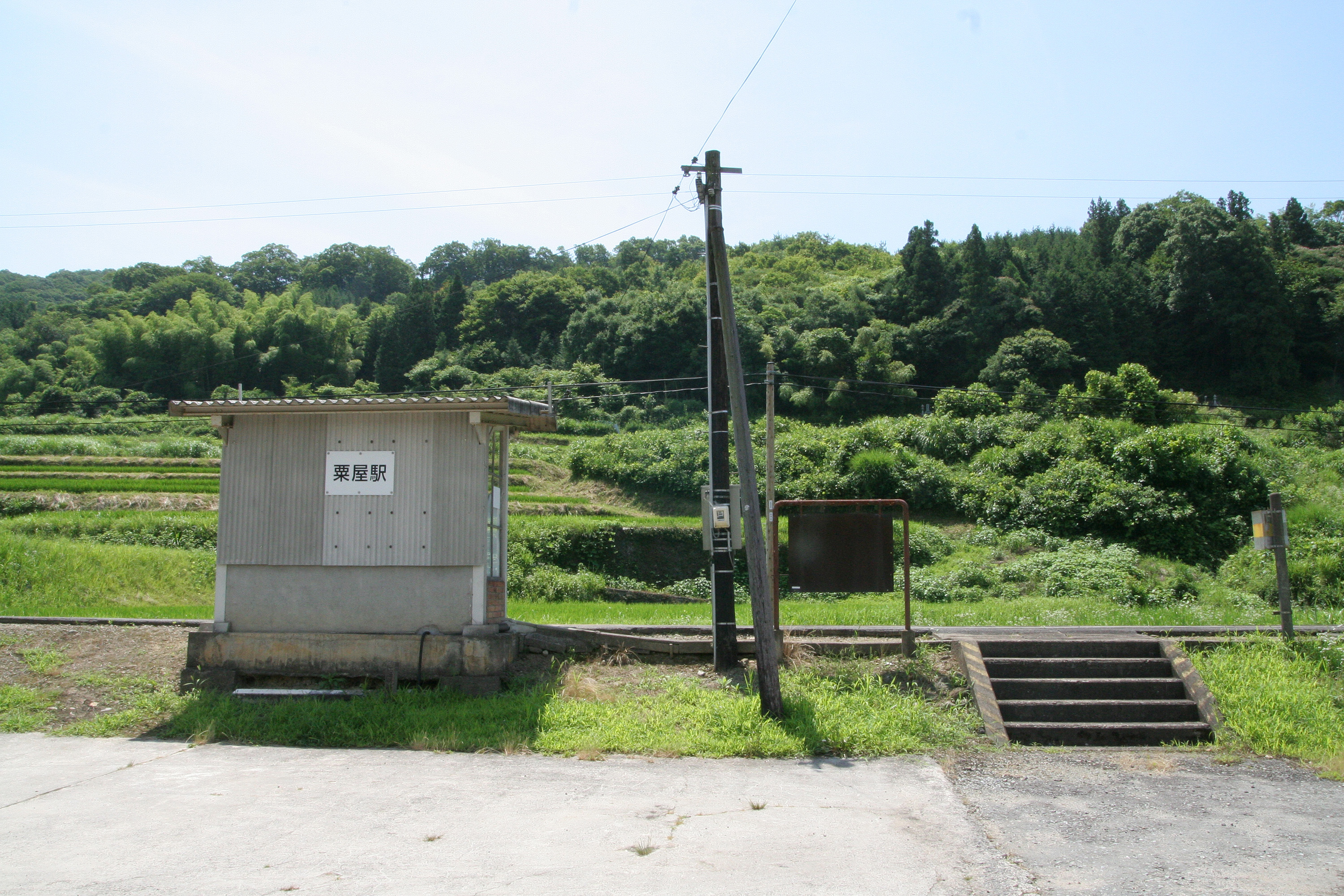
- Awaya Station in July 2008

General information
- Location: 3598 Awaya-machi Aza Shimotsugōchi, Miyoshi （広島県三次市粟屋町字下津河内3598） Hiroshima Prefecture; Japan
- Coordinates: 34°48′37″N 132°48′46″E
- Operator: JR West
- Line: F Sankō Line

History
- Opened: 1955
- Closed: 31 March 2018
Location
- Location within Japan

Awaya Station (粟屋駅, Awaya-eki) was a railway station in Miyoshi, Hiroshima Prefecture, Japan, operated by West Japan Railway Company (JR West).

== Lines ==
Awaya Station was served by the 108.1 km Sankō Line from Gōtsu in Shimane Prefecture to Miyoshi in Hiroshima Prefecture, which closed on 31 March 2018.

== Adjacent stations ==
«	Service	»
Sankō Line
Nagatani	Local	Ozekiyama

== History ==
On 16 October 2015, JR West announced that it was considering closing the Sanko Line due to poor patronage. On 29 September 2016, JR West announced that the entire line would close on 31 March 2018. The line then closed on March 31, 2018, with an event hosted by JR West.

== See also ==
- List of railway stations in Japan
