= Gōtsu Station =

Railway station in Gōtsu, Shimane Prefecture, Japan

Gōtsu Station 江津駅
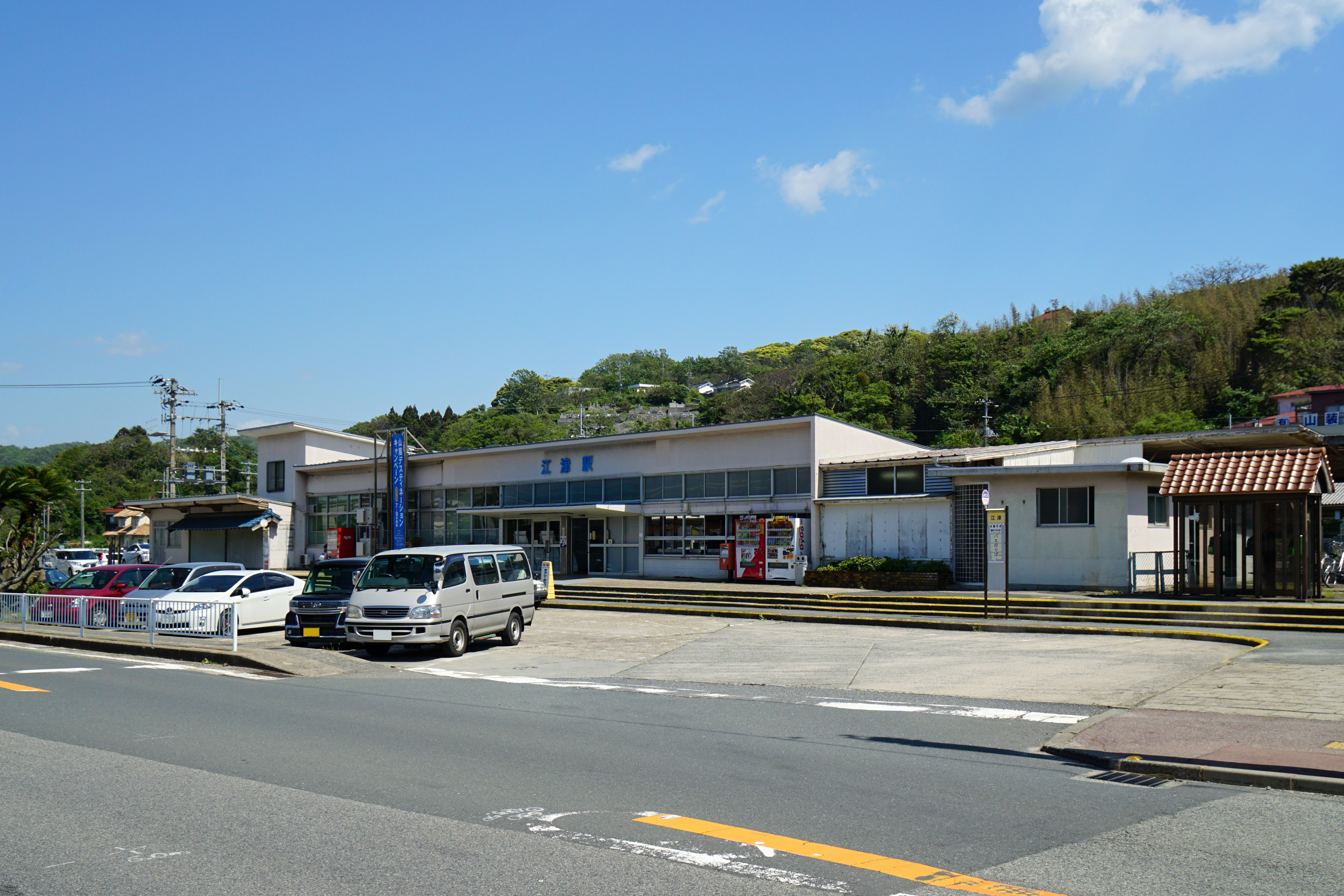
- Gōtsu Station, May 2018

General information
- Location: 926 Gōtsu-chō, Gōtsu-shi, Shimane-ken 695-0011; Japan
- Coordinates: 35°0′46.03″N 132°13′23.55″E
- Owner: West Japan Railway Company
- Operator: West Japan Railway Company
- Line: D San'in Main Line
- Distance: 454.3 km (282.3 miles) from Kyoto
- Platforms: 1 side + 1 island platform
- Tracks: 3
- Connections: Bus stop

Construction
- Structure type: Ground level

Other information
- Status: Staffed
- Website: Official website

History
- Opened: 25 December 1920
- Former names: Iwami-Gōtsu (until June 1970)

Passengers
- FY2020: 253

Services
Preceding station	JR West	Following station
Tsunozu towards Masuda	San'in Line	Asari towards Yonago
Location
- Location within Shimane Prefecture Location within Japan

Gōtsu Station (江津駅, Gōtsu-eki) is a passenger railway station located in the city of Gōtsu, Shimane Prefecture, Japan. It is operated by the West Japan Railway Company (JR West).

== Lines ==
Gōtsu Station is served by the JR West San'in Main Line, and is located 454.3 kilometers from the terminus of the line at Kyoto. This was the terminal station for the Sankō Line before it ceased operation on 31 March 2018. The Sankō Line was replaced by a bus service starting 1 April 2018.

== Station layout ==
Gōtsu Station has one side platform and one island platform. The side platform (track 1) is in front of the station office. The island platform is connected to platform 1 by a footbridge. The station is staffed.

== Platforms ==
1	■ D San'in Main Line	for Ōdashi, Izumoshi, and Matsue
2	■ D San'in Main Line	for Hamada and Masuda
3	■ D San'in Main Line	for bi-directional use

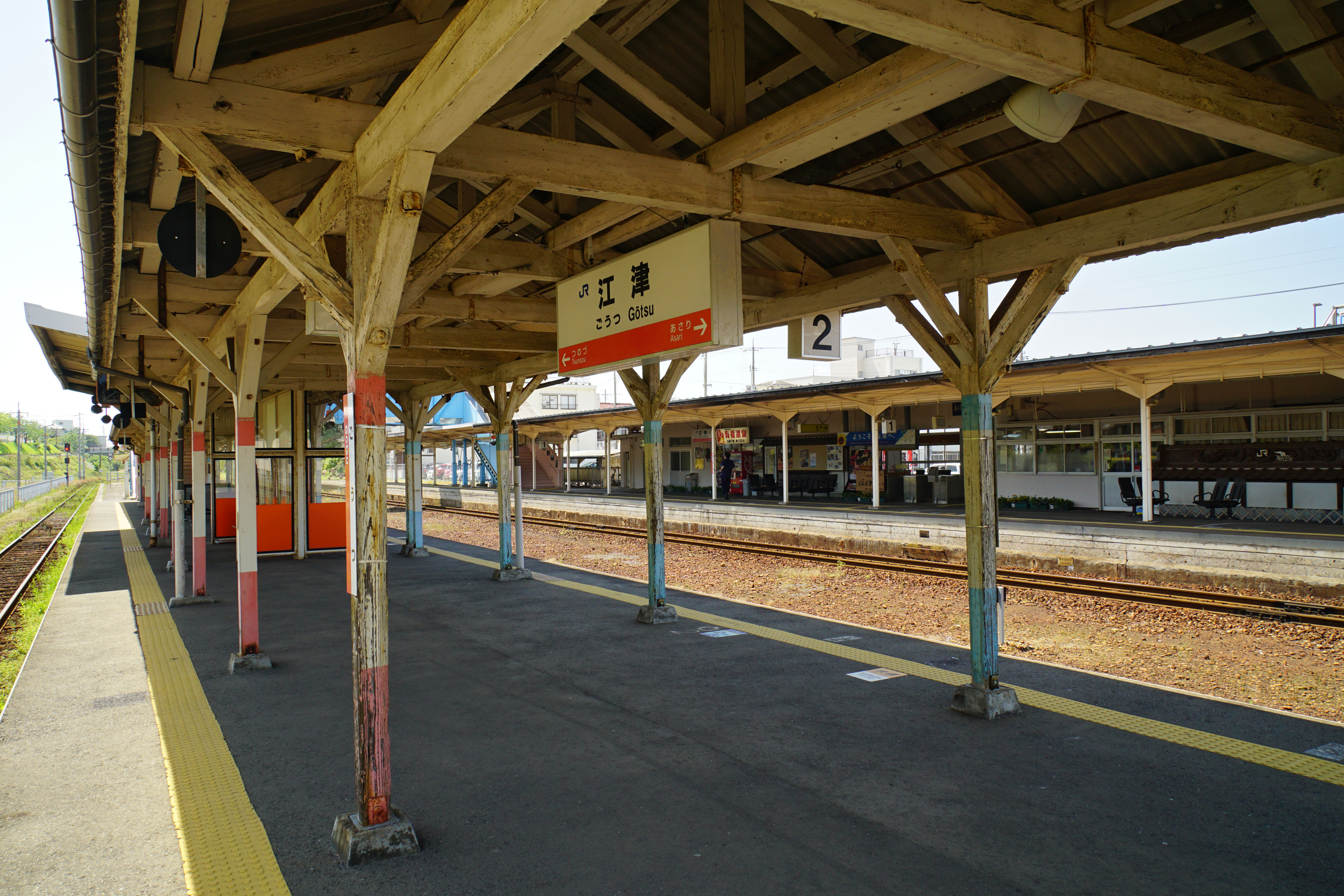
The platforms in May 2018

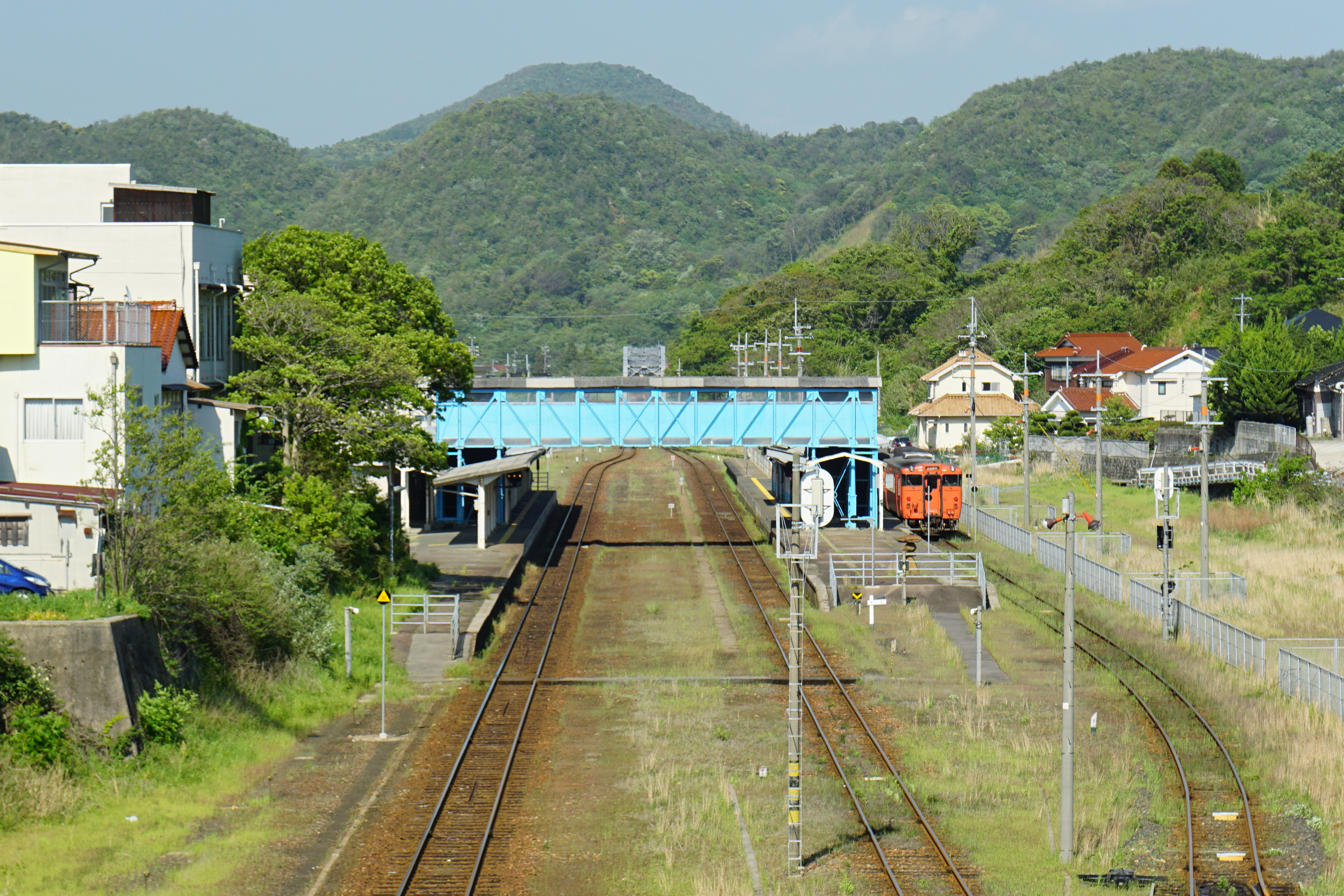
The platforms in May 2018

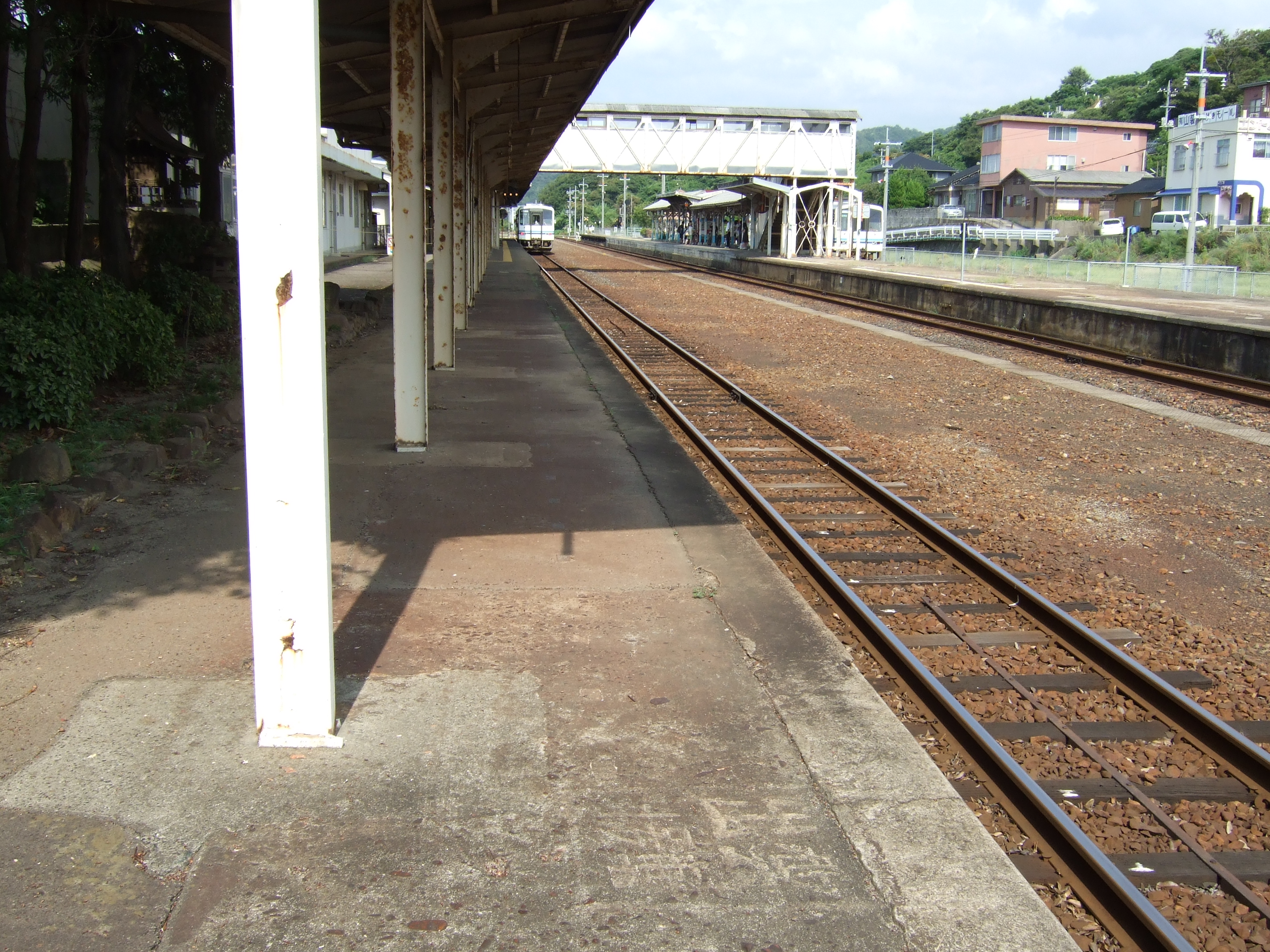
The platforms in August 2008

== History ==
The station opened on 25 December 1920, originally named Iwami-Gōtsu Station (石見江津駅). It was renamed simply Gōtsu Station on 1 June 1970.

With the privatization of Japanese National Railways (JNR) on 1 April 1987, the station came under the control of JR West.

On 16 October 2015, JR West announced that it was considering closing the Sanko Line due to poor patronage. On 29 September 2016, JR West announced that the entire line would close on 31 March 2018.

== Passenger statistics ==
In fiscal 2020, the station was used by an average of 253 passengers daily.

== Surrounding area ==
- Gotsu City Hall
- Gotsu Municipal Gotsu Junior High School
- Shimane Prefectural Gotsu Technical High School
- Saiseikai Gotsu General Hospital
- National Route 9

== See also ==
- List of railway stations in Japan
