= Hamahara Station =

Former railway station in Misato, Shimane Prefecture, Japan

Hamahara Station 浜原駅
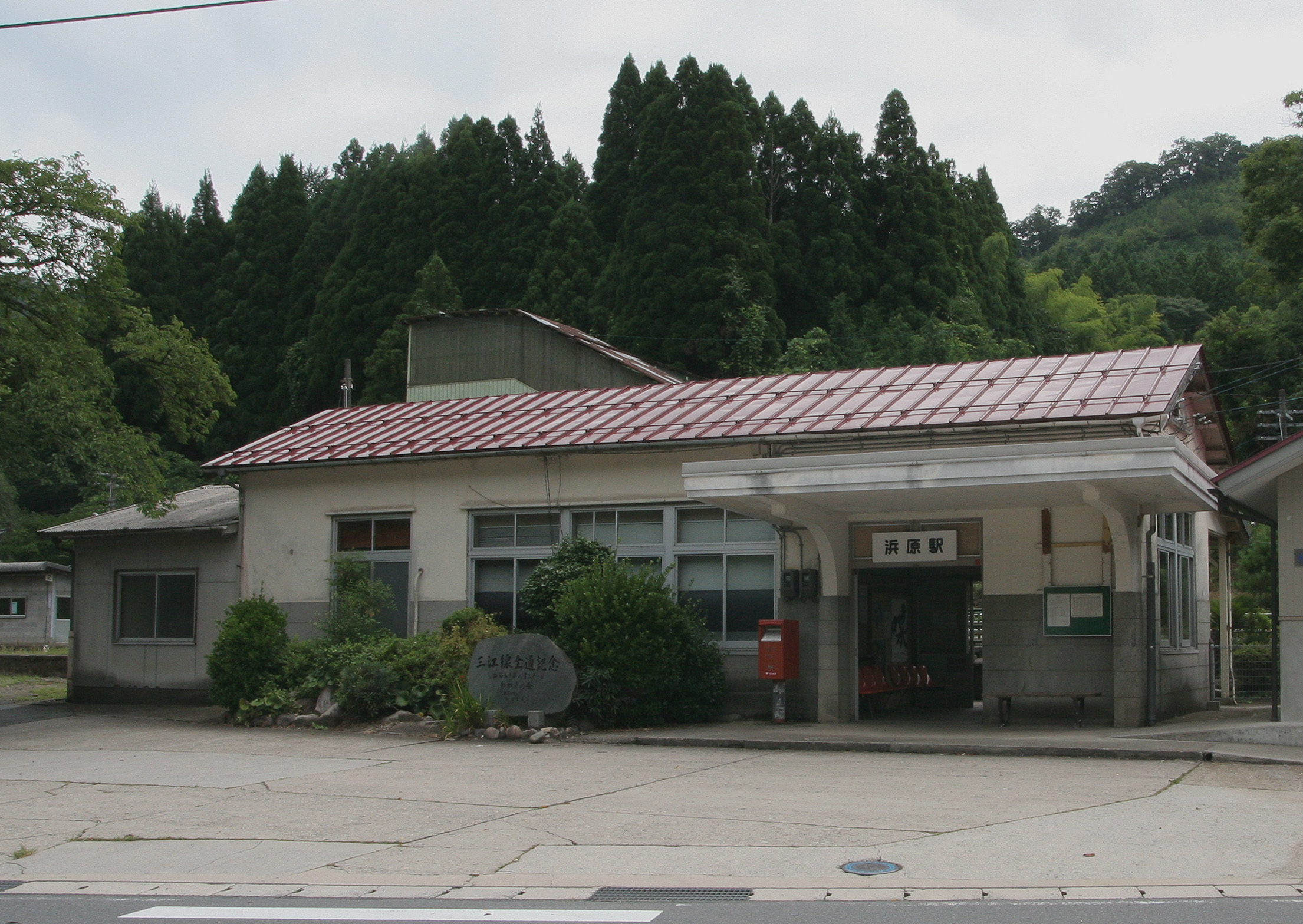
- Hamahara Station in July 2008

General information
- Location: 71, Hamahara, Misato, Ōchi District （島根県邑智郡美郷町浜原71） Shimane Prefecture; Japan
- Coordinates: 35°03′37″N 132°35′59″E
- Operator: JR West
- Line: F Sankō Line
- Connections: Bus stop

History
- Opened: 1937
- Closed: 2018
Location
- Location within Japan

Hamahara Station (浜原駅, Hamahara-eki) was a railway station in Misato, Ōchi District, Shimane Prefecture, Japan, operated by West Japan Railway Company (JR West).

== Lines ==
Hamahara Station was served by the 108.1 km Sankō Line from Gōtsu in Shimane Prefecture to Miyoshi in Hiroshima Prefecture, which closed on 31 March 2018.

== Adjacent stations ==
| « | Service | » |
Sankō Line
| Kasubuchi | Local | Sawadani |

== History ==
On 16 October 2015, JR West announced that it was considering closing the Sanko Line due to poor patronage. On 29 September 2016, JR West announced that the entire line would close on 31 March 2018. The line then closed on March 31, 2018, with an event hosted by JR West.

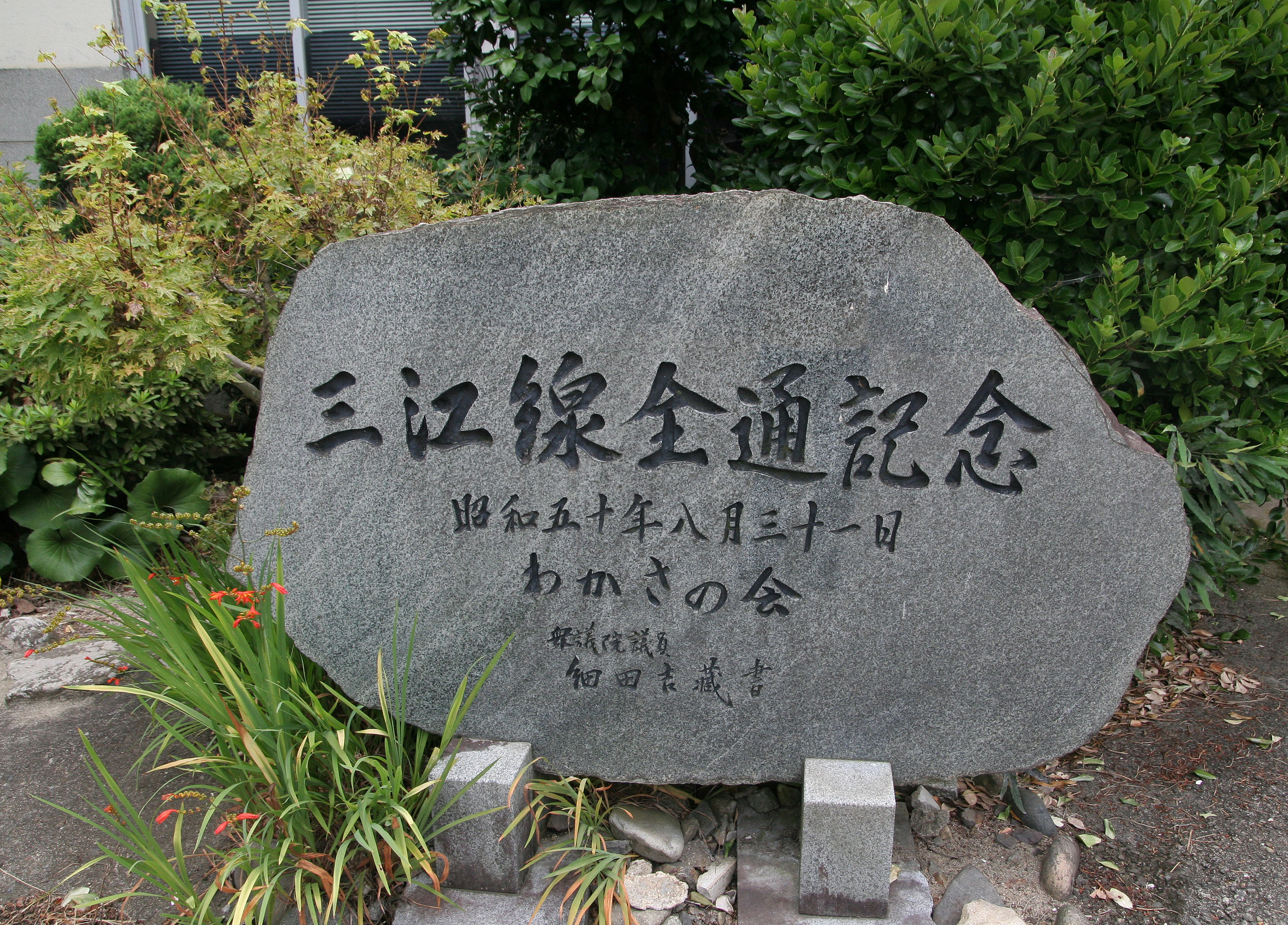
Japanese National Railways Sanko Line Memorial

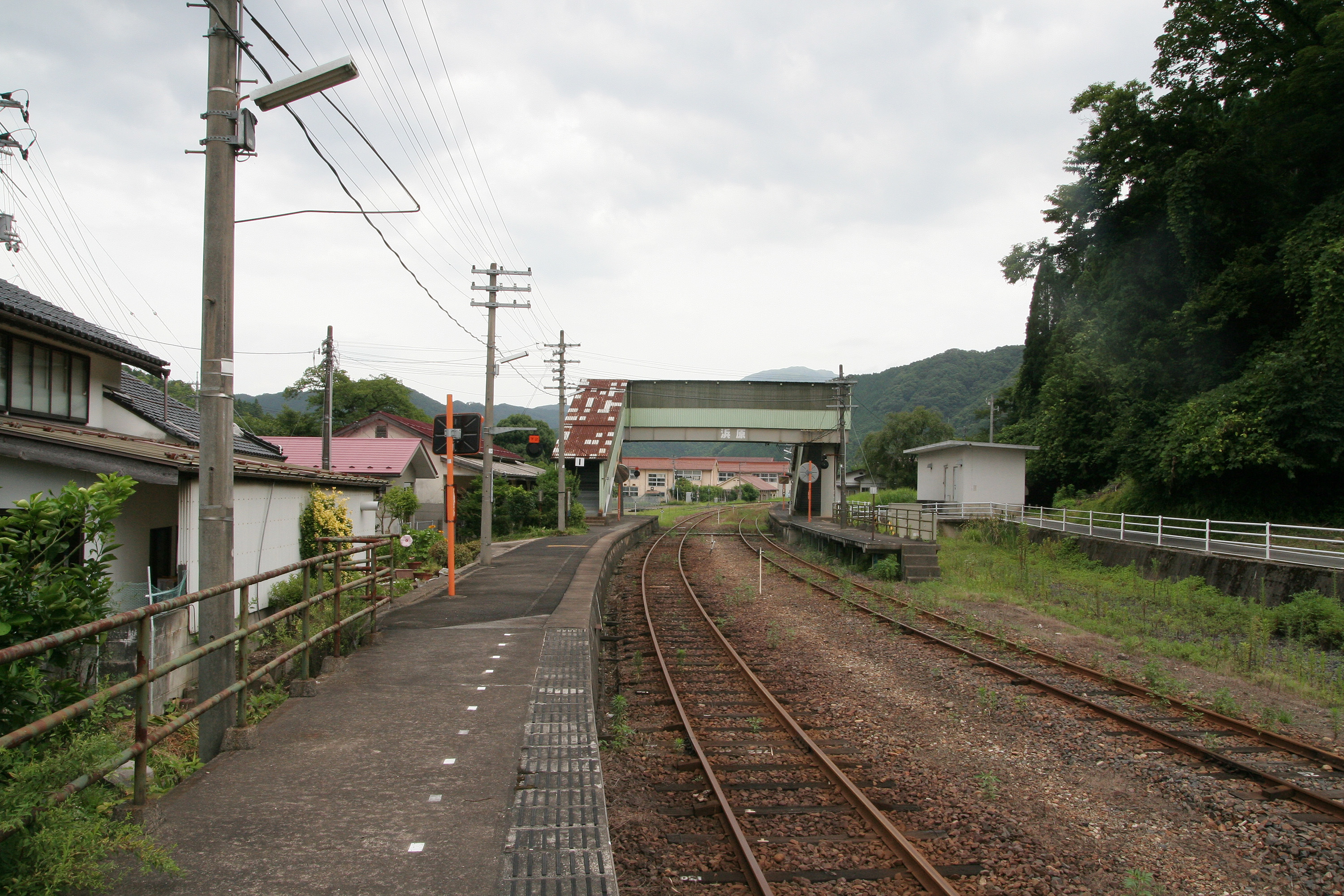
Hamahara Station platforms in July 2008

== See also ==
- List of railway stations in Japan
