= Ushio Station =

Former railway station in Shimane Prefecture, Japan

Ushio Station 潮駅
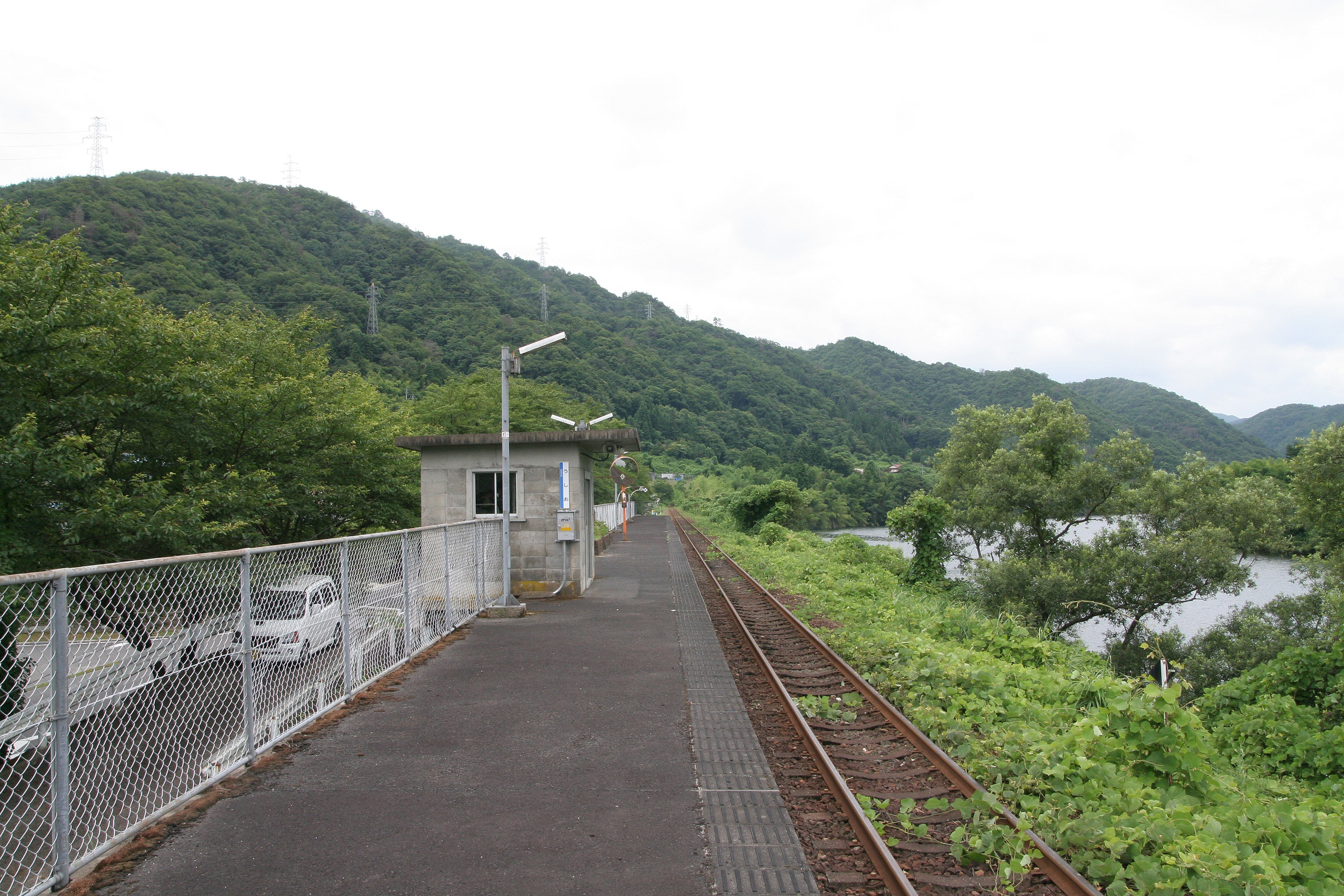
- Ushio Station in July 2008

General information
- Location: 281, Ushiomura, Misato, Ōchi District （島根県邑智郡美郷町潮村281） Shimane Prefecture; Japan
- Coordinates: 35°00′56″N 132°37′56″E
- Operator: JR West
- Line: F Sankō Line
- Platforms: 1 side platform
- Tracks: 1
- Connections: Bus stop

History
- Opened: 1975
- Closed: 2018
Location
- Location within Japan

Ushio Station (潮駅, Ushio-eki) was a railway station in Misato, Ōchi District, Shimane Prefecture, Japan, operated by West Japan Railway Company (JR West).

== Lines ==
Ushio Station was served by the 108.1 km Sankō Line from Gōtsu in Shimane Prefecture to Miyoshi in Hiroshima Prefecture, which closed on 31 March 2018.

== Layout ==
The station has one side platform serving a single bi-directional track.

== Adjacent stations ==
«	Service	»
Sankō Line
Sawadani	Local	Iwami Matsubara

== History ==
On 16 October 2015, JR West announced that it was considering closing the Sanko Line due to poor patronage. On 29 September 2016, JR West announced that the entire line would close on 31 March 2018. The line then closed on March 31, 2018, with an event hosted by JR West.

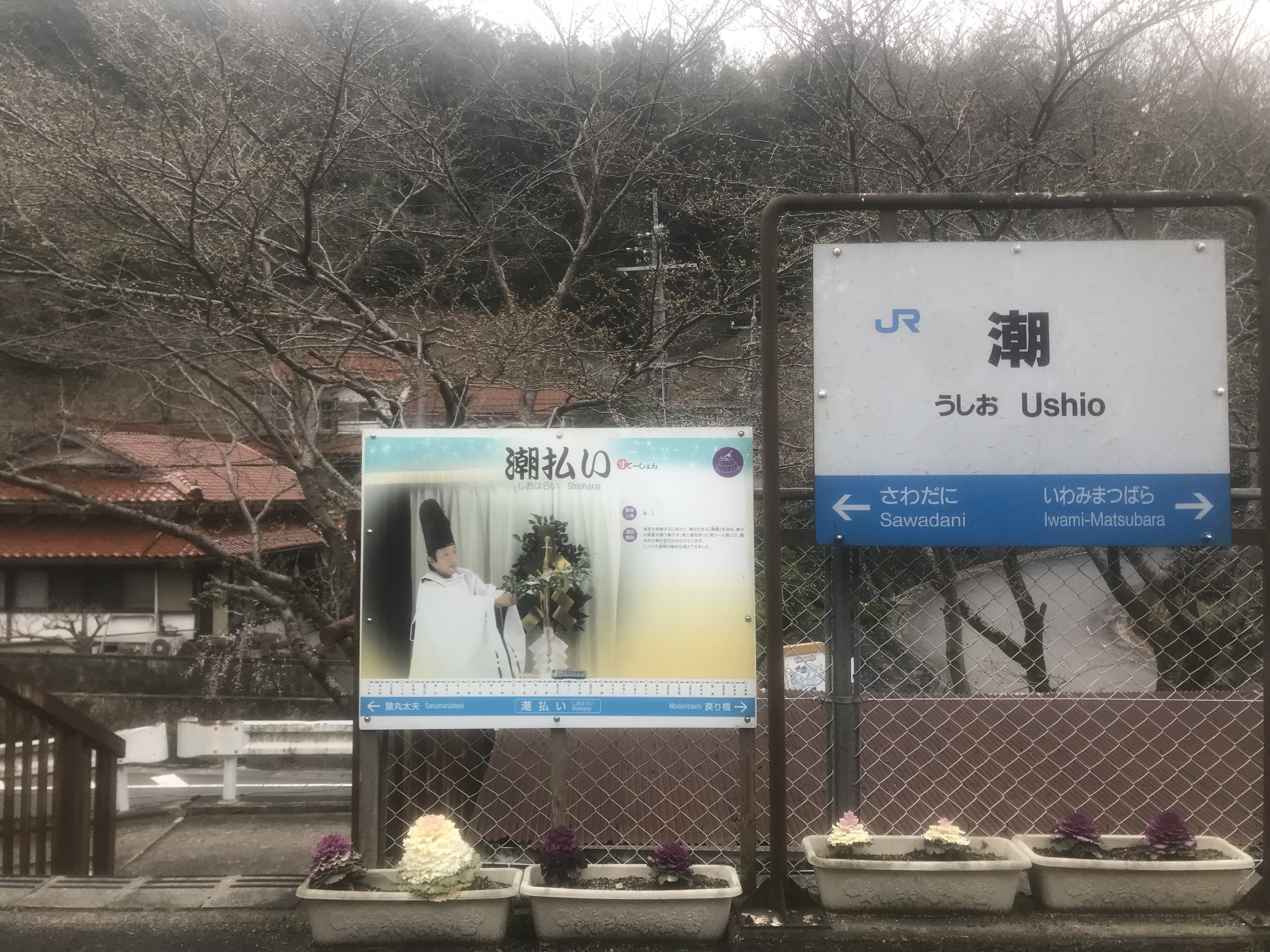
Station signs in March 2018

== See also ==
- List of railway stations in Japan
