= Sawadani Station =

Former railway station in Misato, Japan

Sawadani Station 沢谷駅
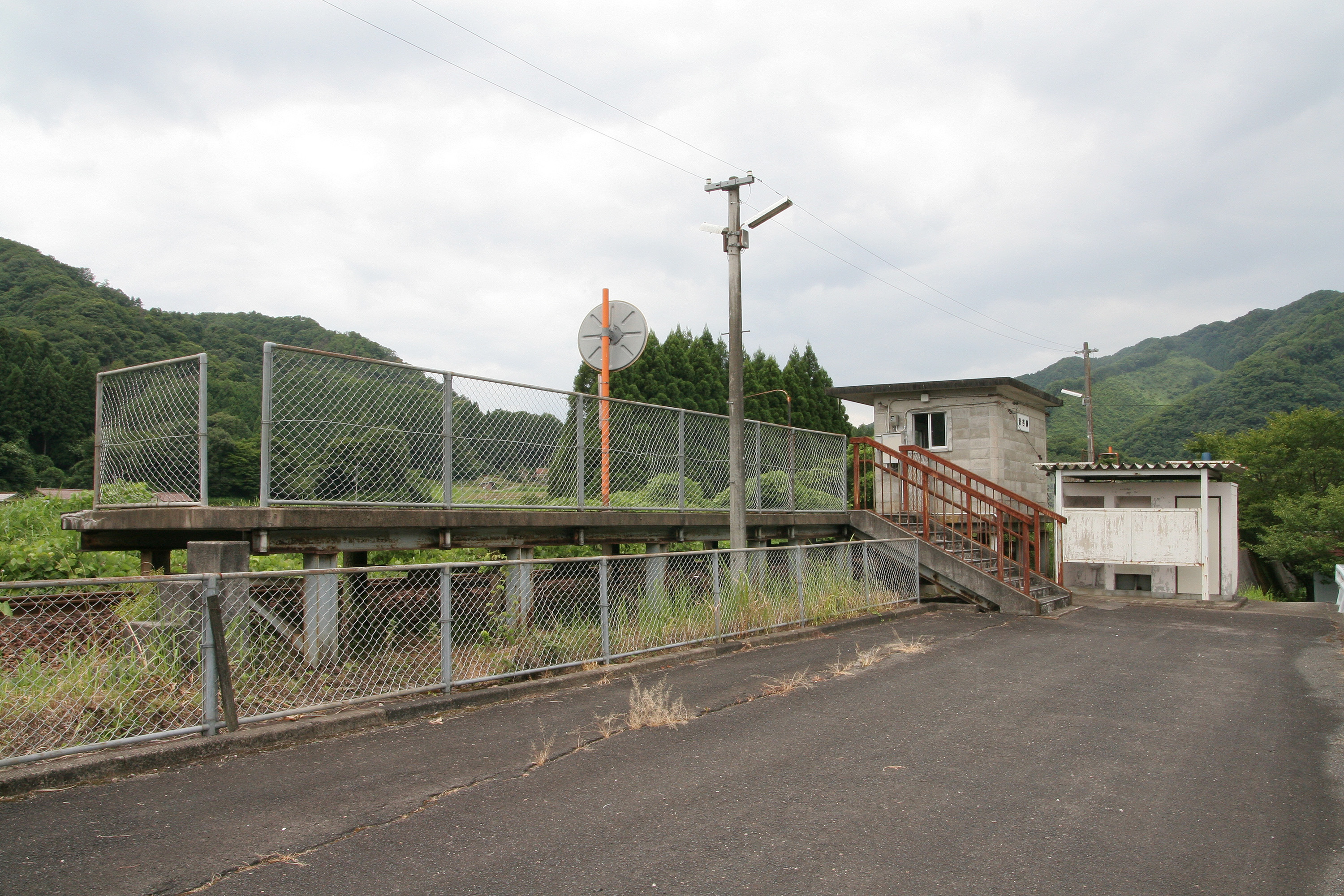
- Sawadani Station in July 2008

General information
- Location: 111, Ishihara, Misato, Ōchi District （島根県邑智郡美郷町石原111） Shimane Prefecture; Japan
- Coordinates: 35°03′29″N 132°38′05″E
- Operator: JR West
- Line: F Sankō Line
- Connections: Bus stop

History
- Opened: 1975
- Closed: 2018
Location
- Location within Japan

Sawadani Station (沢谷駅, Sawadani-eki) was a railway station in Misato, Ōchi District, Shimane Prefecture, Japan, operated by West Japan Railway Company (JR West).

== Lines ==
Sawadani Station was served by the 108.1 km Sankō Line from Gōtsu in Shimane Prefecture to Miyoshi in Hiroshima Prefecture, which closed on 31 March 2018.

== Adjacent stations ==
«	Service	»
Sankō Line
Hamahara	Local	Ushio

== History ==
On 16 October 2015, JR West announced that it was considering closing the Sanko Line due to poor patronage. On 29 September 2016, JR West announced that the entire line would close on 31 March 2018. The line then closed on March 31, 2018, with an event hosted by JR West.

== See also ==
- List of railway stations in Japan
