= Iwami-Tsuga Station =

Railway station in Japan

Iwami-Tsuga Station 石見都賀駅
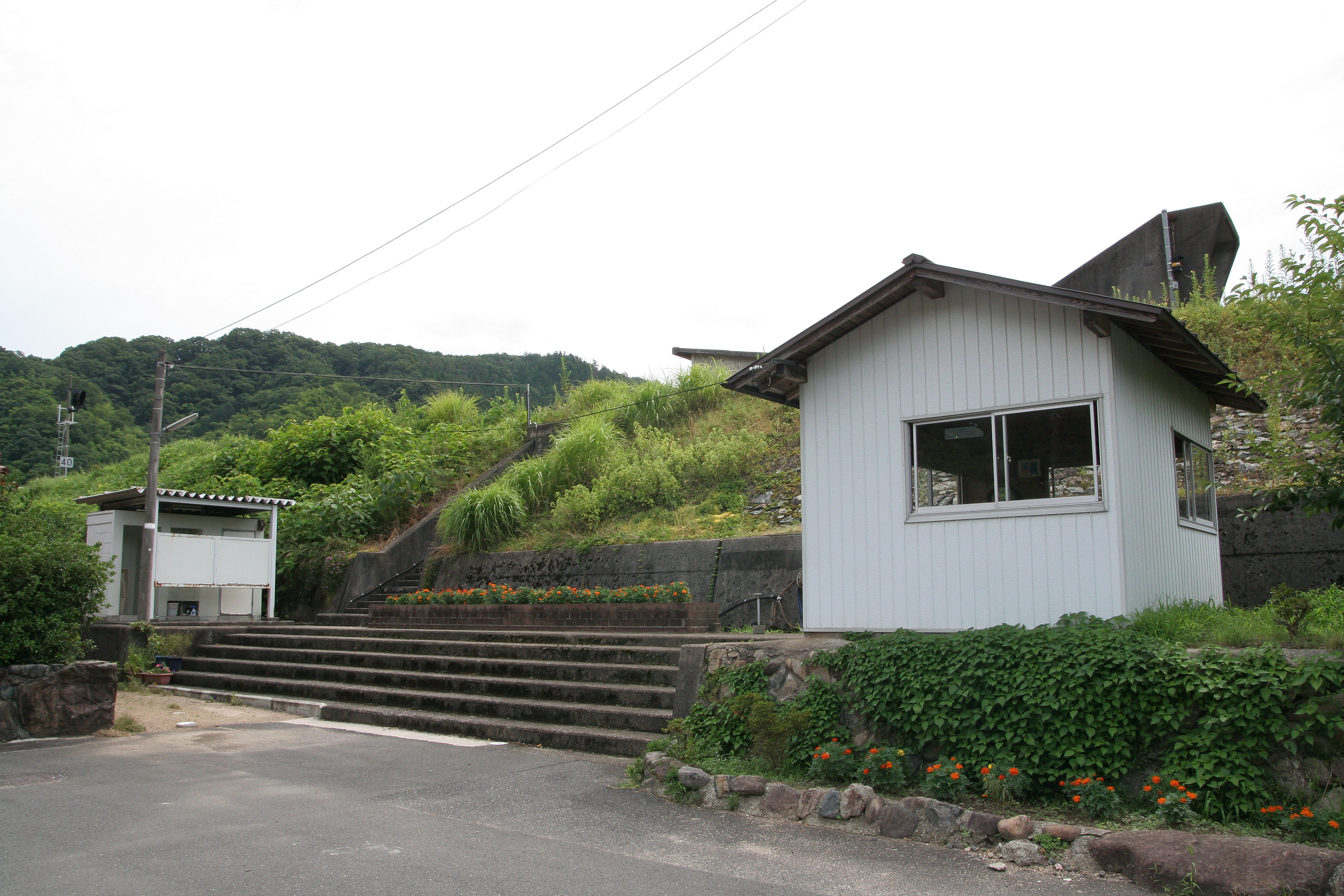
- Iwami-Tsuga Station in July 2008

General information
- Location: 300 Tsugahongō, Misato, Ōchi District （島根県邑智郡美郷町都賀本郷300） Shimane Prefecture; Japan
- Coordinates: 34°57′23″N 132°38′33″E
- Operator: JR West
- Line: F Sankō Line
- Connections: Bus stop

History
- Opened: 1975
- Closed: 2018
Location
- Location within Japan

Iwami-Tsuga Station (石見都賀駅, Iwami Tsuga-eki) was a railway station in Misato, Ōchi District, Shimane Prefecture, Japan, operated by West Japan Railway Company (JR West).

== Lines ==
Iwami-Tsuga Station was served by the 108.1 km Sankō Line from Gōtsu in Shimane Prefecture to Miyoshi in Hiroshima Prefecture, which closed on 31 March 2018.

== Adjacent stations ==
«	Service	»
Sankō Line
Iwami-Matsubara	Local	Uzui

== History ==
On 16 October 2015, JR West announced that it was considering closing the Sanko Line due to poor patronage. On 29 September 2016, JR West announced that the entire line would close on 31 March 2018. The line then closed on March 31, 2018, with an event hosted by JR West.

== See also ==
- List of railway stations in Japan
