= Akatsuka Station (Shimane) =

Former railway station in Misato, Shimane Prefecture, Japan

Akatsuka Station 明塚駅
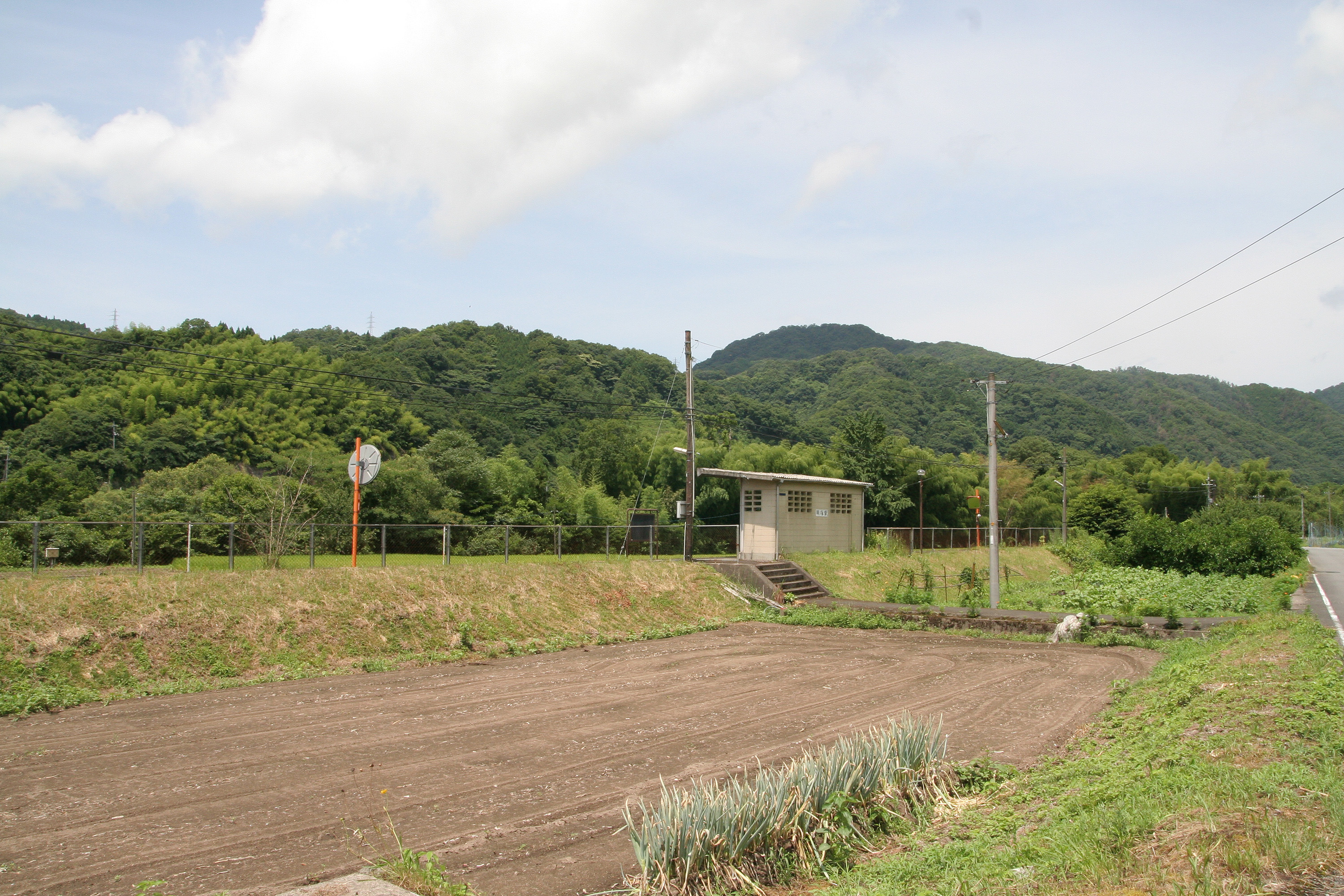
- Akatsuka Station in July 2008

General information
- Location: 84, Akatsuka, Misato, Ōchi District （島根県邑智郡美郷町明塚84） Shimane Prefecture; Japan
- Coordinates: 35°02′56″N 132°35′02″E
- Operator: JR West
- Line: F Sankō Line

History
- Opened: 1967
- Closed: 2018
Location
- Location within Japan

Akatsuka Station (明塚駅, Akatsuka-eki) was a railway station in Misato, Ōchi District, Shimane Prefecture, Japan, operated by West Japan Railway Company (JR West).

== Lines ==
Akatsuka Station was served by the 108.1 km Sankō Line from Gōtsu in Shimane Prefecture to Miyoshi in Hiroshima Prefecture, which closed on 31 March 2018.

== Adjacent stations ==
«	Service	»
Sankō Line
Iwami Yanaze	Local	Kasubuchi

== History ==
On 16 October 2015, JR West announced that it was considering closing the Sanko Line due to poor patronage. On 29 September 2016, JR West announced that the entire line would close on 31 March 2018. The line then closed on March 31, 2018, with an event hosted by JR West.

== See also ==
- List of railway stations in Japan
