= Ōnan, Shimane =

Onan 邑南町
- Town
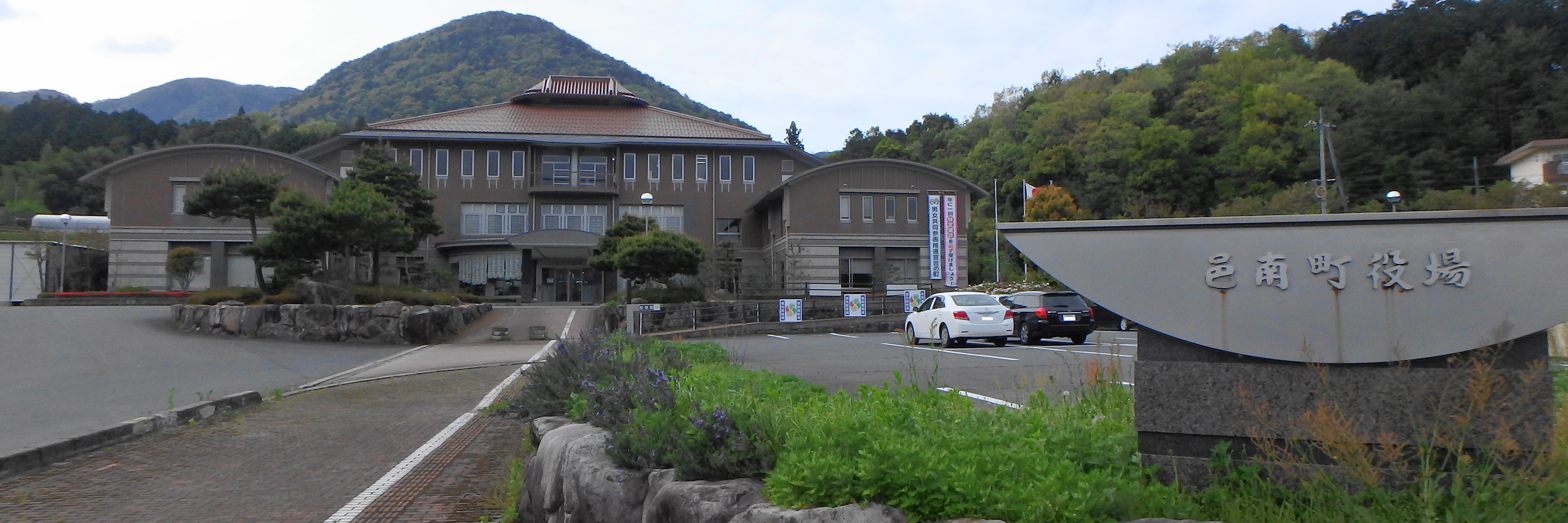
- Ōnan town hall

- Flag Seal
- Location of Onan in Shimane Prefecture

- Location in Japan
- Coordinates: 34°53′38″N 132°26′16″E
- Country: Japan
- Region: Chūgoku; San'in
- Prefecture: Shimane
- District: Ōchi

Government
  - Mayor: Ishibashi Ryoji

Area
  - Total: 419.29 km^{2} (161.89 sq mi)

Population (July 31, 2023)
  - Total: 9,838
  - Density: 23.46/km^{2} (60.77/sq mi)
- Time zone: UTC+09:00 (JST)
- City hall address: 6000 Yagami, Onan-cho, Ochi-gun, Shimane-ken 696-0192
- Climate: Cfa
- Website: Official website
- Symbols
- Flower: Sakura
- Tree: Japanese Red Pine

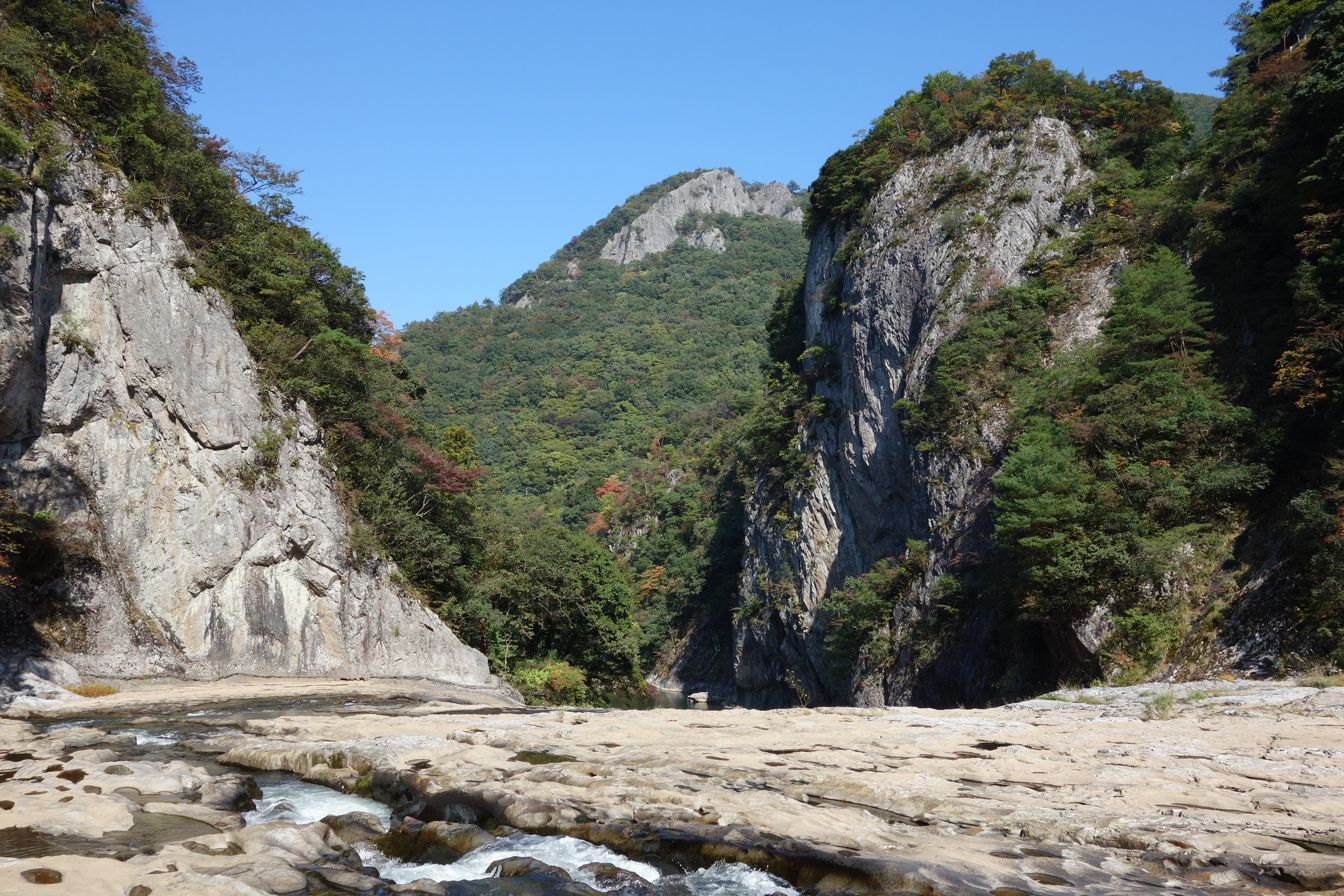
Dangyokei Gorge

Ōnan (邑南町, Ōnan-chō) is a town located in Ōchi District, Shimane Prefecture, Japan. As of 31 July 2023, the town had an estimated population of 9,838 in 4712 households and a population density of 23 persons per km^{2}. The total area of the town is 419.29 square kilometres (161.89 sq mi).

== Geography ==
Ōnan is located in west-central Shimane, in the Chugoku Mountains bordered by Hiroshima Prefecture to the south.

== Neighboring municipalities ==
Hiroshima Prefecture

- Akitakata
- Kitahiroshima
- Miyoshi

Shimane Prefecture

- Gōtsu
- Hamada
- Kawamoto
- Misato

=== Climate ===
Ōnan has a humid subtropical climate (Köppen climate classification Cfa) with very warm summers and cool winters. Precipitation is abundant throughout the year. The average annual temperature in Ōnan is 12.1 °C (53.8 °F). The average annual rainfall is 1,885.0 mm (74.21 in) with July as the wettest month. The temperatures are highest on average in August, at around 24.3 °C (75.7 °F), and lowest in January, at around 0.7 °C (33.3 °F). The highest temperature ever recorded in Ōnan was 36.5 °C (97.7 °F) on 8 August 1994; the coldest temperature ever recorded was −16.3 °C (2.7 °F) on 28 February 1981.

Climate data for Mizuho, Ōnan (1991−2020 normals, extremes 1978−present)
Month	Jan	Feb	Mar	Apr	May	Jun	Jul	Aug	Sep	Oct	Nov	Dec	Year
Record high °C (°F)	16.7 (62.1)	20.5 (68.9)	23.7 (74.7)	30.3 (86.5)	32.2 (90.0)	33.9 (93.0)	36.4 (97.5)	36.5 (97.7)	35.0 (95.0)	30.1 (86.2)	25.1 (77.2)	18.8 (65.8)	36.5 (97.7)
Mean daily maximum °C (°F)	5.2 (41.4)	6.7 (44.1)	11.5 (52.7)	17.9 (64.2)	23.0 (73.4)	25.7 (78.3)	29.1 (84.4)	30.5 (86.9)	25.9 (78.6)	20.3 (68.5)	14.3 (57.7)	7.8 (46.0)	18.2 (64.7)
Daily mean °C (°F)	0.7 (33.3)	1.4 (34.5)	5.0 (41.0)	10.6 (51.1)	15.7 (60.3)	19.6 (67.3)	23.6 (74.5)	24.3 (75.7)	20.0 (68.0)	13.6 (56.5)	7.9 (46.2)	2.8 (37.0)	12.1 (53.8)
Mean daily minimum °C (°F)	−2.9 (26.8)	−3.0 (26.6)	−0.9 (30.4)	3.6 (38.5)	8.9 (48.0)	14.6 (58.3)	19.4 (66.9)	19.9 (67.8)	15.4 (59.7)	8.2 (46.8)	2.7 (36.9)	−1.1 (30.0)	7.1 (44.7)
Record low °C (°F)	−12.6 (9.3)	−16.3 (2.7)	−10.1 (13.8)	−5.9 (21.4)	−1.9 (28.6)	3.9 (39.0)	9.2 (48.6)	10.9 (51.6)	2.1 (35.8)	−1.9 (28.6)	−5.0 (23.0)	−11.3 (11.7)	−16.3 (2.7)
Average precipitation mm (inches)	151.8 (5.98)	130.9 (5.15)	145.9 (5.74)	126.3 (4.97)	139.7 (5.50)	194.6 (7.66)	260.9 (10.27)	169.9 (6.69)	201.7 (7.94)	112.7 (4.44)	95.5 (3.76)	155.3 (6.11)	1,885 (74.21)
Average snowfall cm (inches)	115 (45)	86 (34)	21 (8.3)	0 (0)	0 (0)	0 (0)	0 (0)	0 (0)	0 (0)	0 (0)	1 (0.4)	49 (19)	272 (107)
Average precipitation days (≥ 1.0 mm)	18.3	15.3	14.5	11.3	10.1	12.3	13.5	10.7	11.2	9.4	11.4	17.0	155
Average snowy days (≥ 3 cm)	9.8	7.5	1.5	0	0	0	0	0	0	0	0.1	3.9	22.8
Mean monthly sunshine hours	66.0	82.2	137.8	177.8	200.0	144.2	149.4	182.5	140.7	146.3	109.3	75.8	1,612
Source: Japan Meteorological Agency

=== Demographics ===
Per Japanese census data, the population of Ōnan in 2020 was 10,163 people. Ōnan has been conducting censuses since 1960.

Historical population
Year	Pop.	±%
1960	25,547	—
1965	21,359	−16.4%
1970	17,919	−16.1%
1975	16,659	−7.0%
1980	15,734	−5.6%
1985	15,795	+0.4%
1990	15,117	−4.3%
1995	14,456	−4.4%
2000	13,866	−4.1%
2005	12,944	−6.6%
2010	11,966	−7.6%
2015	11,101	−7.2%
2020	10,163	−8.4%
Ōnan population statistics

== History ==
The area of Ōnan was part of ancient Iwami Province. During the Edo Period, the area was divided between of the holdings of Hamada Domain and direct territory of the Tokugawa shogunate. After the Meiji restoration, villages were established within Ōchi District, Shimane on April 1, 1889, with the creation of the modern municipalities system. The town of Ōnan was formed on October 1, 2004, from the merger of the towns of Iwami, Mizuho, and the village of Hasumi.

== Government ==
Ōnan has a mayor-council form of government with a directly elected mayor and a unicameral town council of 13 members. Ōnan, collectively with the towns of Kawamoto and Misato, contributes one member to the Shimane Prefectural Assembly. In terms of national politics, the town is part of the Shimane 2nd district of the lower house of the Diet of Japan.

== Economy ==
Ōnan is a very rural area, with an economy based on agriculture and forestry.

== Education ==
Ōnan has eight public elementary school and three public junior high schools operated by the town government, and one public high school operated by the Shimane Prefectural Board of Education.

== Transportation ==
=== Railway ===
Following the closure of the JR West Sankō Line on April 1, 2018, Ōnan no longer has any passenger railway service. The nearest train station is Gōtsu Station on the JR West San'in Main Line.

JR West - Sankō Line

- Uzui - < Ikawashi > - Kuchiba - Gōbira - Sakugiguchi

=== Highways ===
- Hamada Expressway
- National Route 261

== Notable people from Ōnan ==
- Tetsuo Saito, politician
