= Kuchiba Station =

Former railway station in Ōnan, Shimane Prefecture, Japan

Kuchiba Station 口羽駅
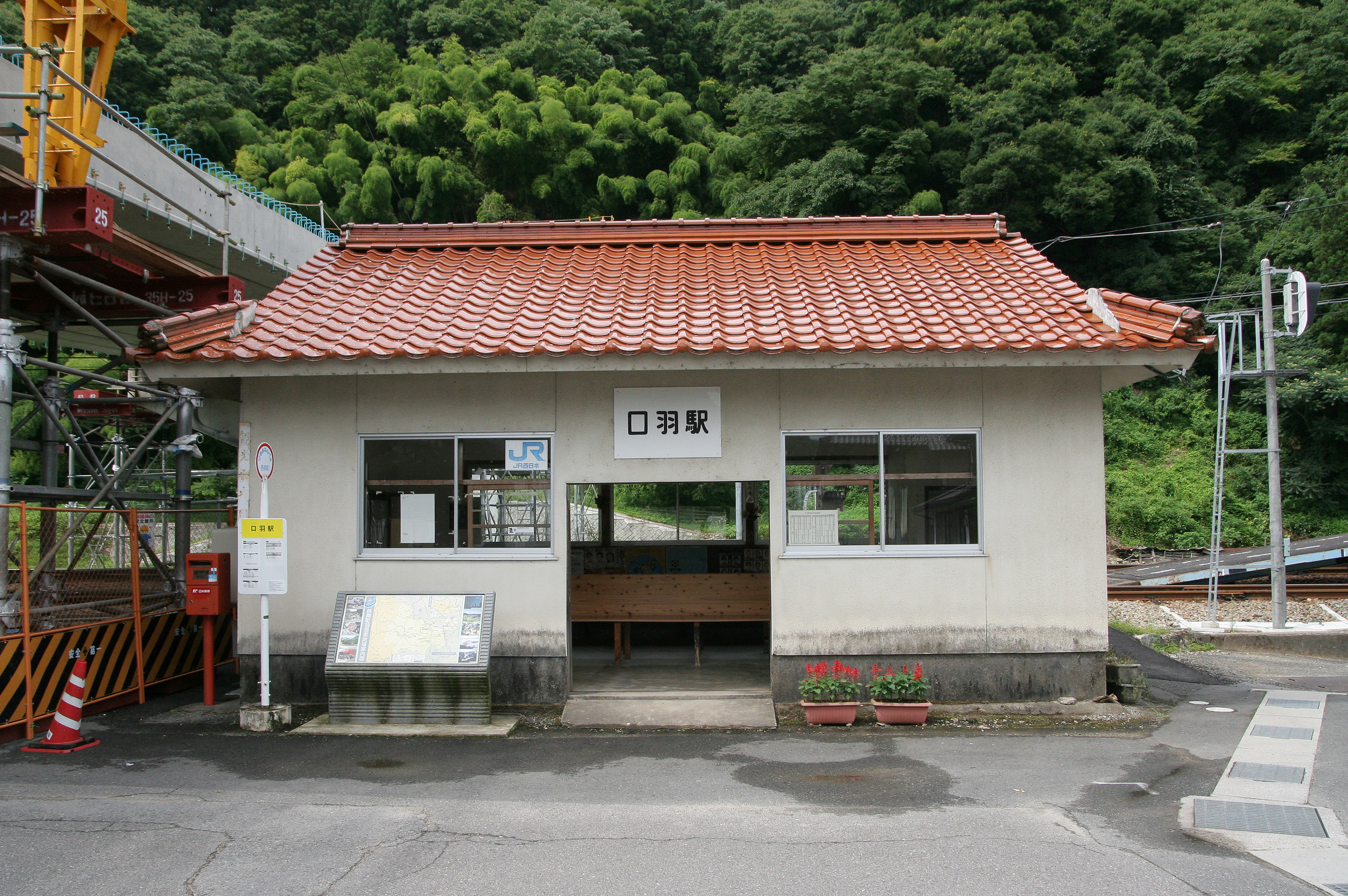
- Kuchiba Station in July 2008

General information
- Location: 1300, Shimokuchiba, Ōnan, Ōchi District （島根県邑智郡邑南町下口羽1300） Shimane Prefecture; Japan
- Coordinates: 34°53′05″N 132°40′16″E
- Operator: JR West
- Line: F Sankō Line
- Connections: Bus stop

History
- Opened: 1963
- Closed: 2018
Location
- Location within Japan

Kuchiba Station (口羽駅, Kuchiba-eki) was a railway station in Ōnan, Ōchi District, Shimane Prefecture, Japan, operated by West Japan Railway Company (JR West).

== Lines ==
Kuchiba Station was served by the 108.1 km Sankō Line from Gōtsu in Shimane Prefecture to Miyoshi in Hiroshima Prefecture, which closed on 31 March 2018.

== Adjacent stations ==
«	Service	»
Sankō Line
Ikawashi	Local	Gōbira

== History ==
On 16 October 2015, JR West announced that it was considering closing the Sanko Line due to poor patronage. On 29 September 2016, JR West announced that the entire line would close on 31 March 2018. The line then closed on March 31, 2018, with an event hosted by JR West.

== See also ==
- List of railway stations in Japan
