= Tokorogi Station =

Former railway station in Akitakata, Hiroshima prefecture, Japan

Tokorogi Station 所木駅
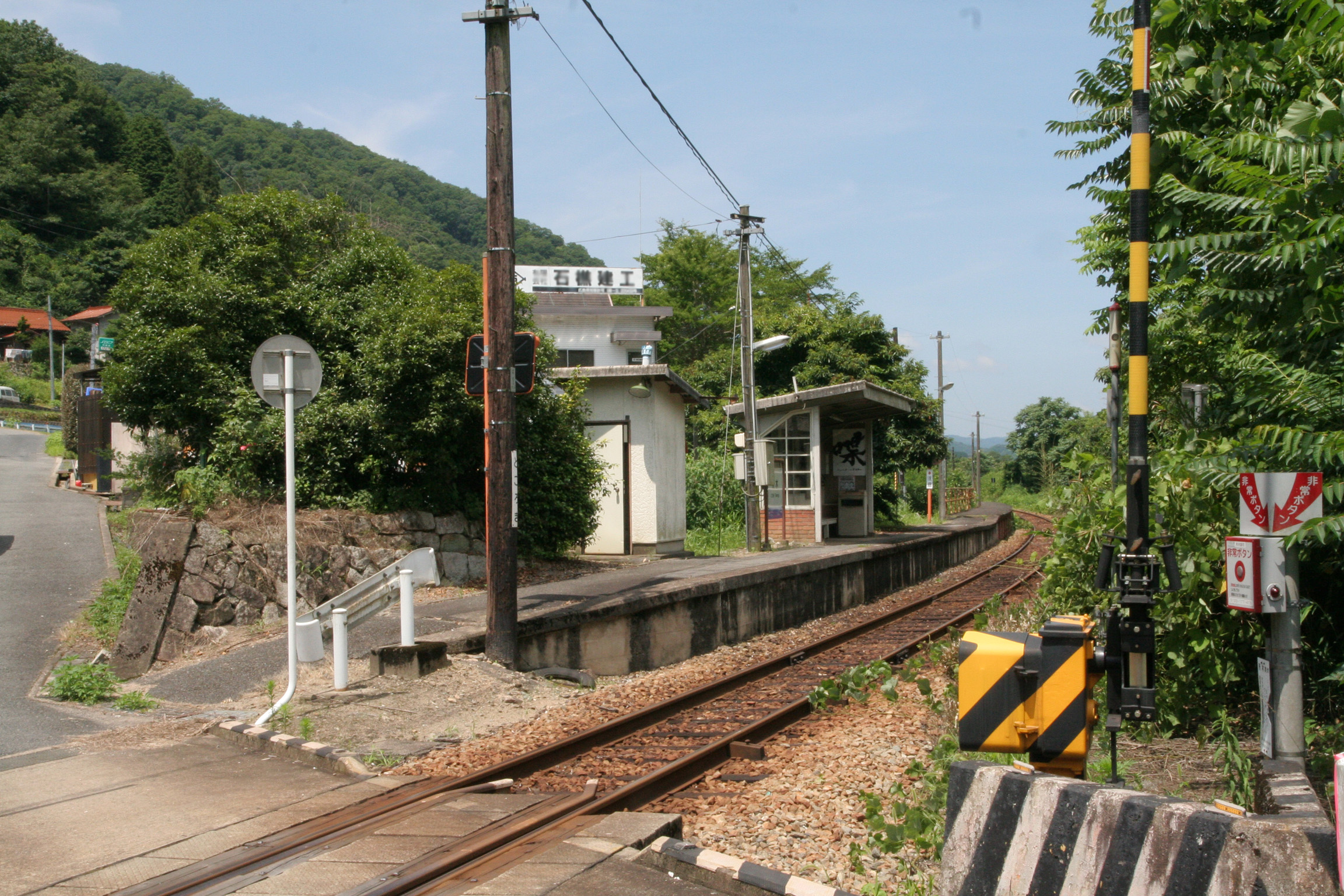
- Tokorogi Station in July 2008

General information
- Location: 3413 Takamiya-chō Funaki Kamitokorogi, Akitakata （広島県安芸高田市高宮町船木上所木3413） Hiroshima Prefecture; Japan
- Coordinates: 34°48′36″N 132°45′03″E
- Operator: JR West
- Line: F Sankō Line
- Platforms: 1 side platform
- Tracks: 1

History
- Opened: 1956
- Closed: 2018
Location
- Location within Japan

Tokorogi Station (所木駅, Tokorogi-eki) was a railway station in Akitakata, Hiroshima Prefecture, Japan, operated by West Japan Railway Company {JR (W)}.

== Lines ==
Tokorogi Station was served by the 108.1 km Sankō Line from Gōtsu in Shimane Prefecture to Miyoshi in Hiroshima Prefecture, which closed on 31 March 2018.

== Adjacent stations ==
«	Service	»
Sankō Line
Nobuki	Local	Funasa

== History ==
On 16 October 2015, JR West announced that it was considering closing the Sanko Line due to poor patronage. On 29 September 2016, JR West announced that the entire line would close on 31 March 2018. The line then closed on March 31, 2018, with an event hosted by JR West.

== See also ==
- List of railway stations in Japan
