= Nobuki Station =

Railway station in Akitakata, Hiroshima prefecture, Japan

Nobuki Station 信木駅
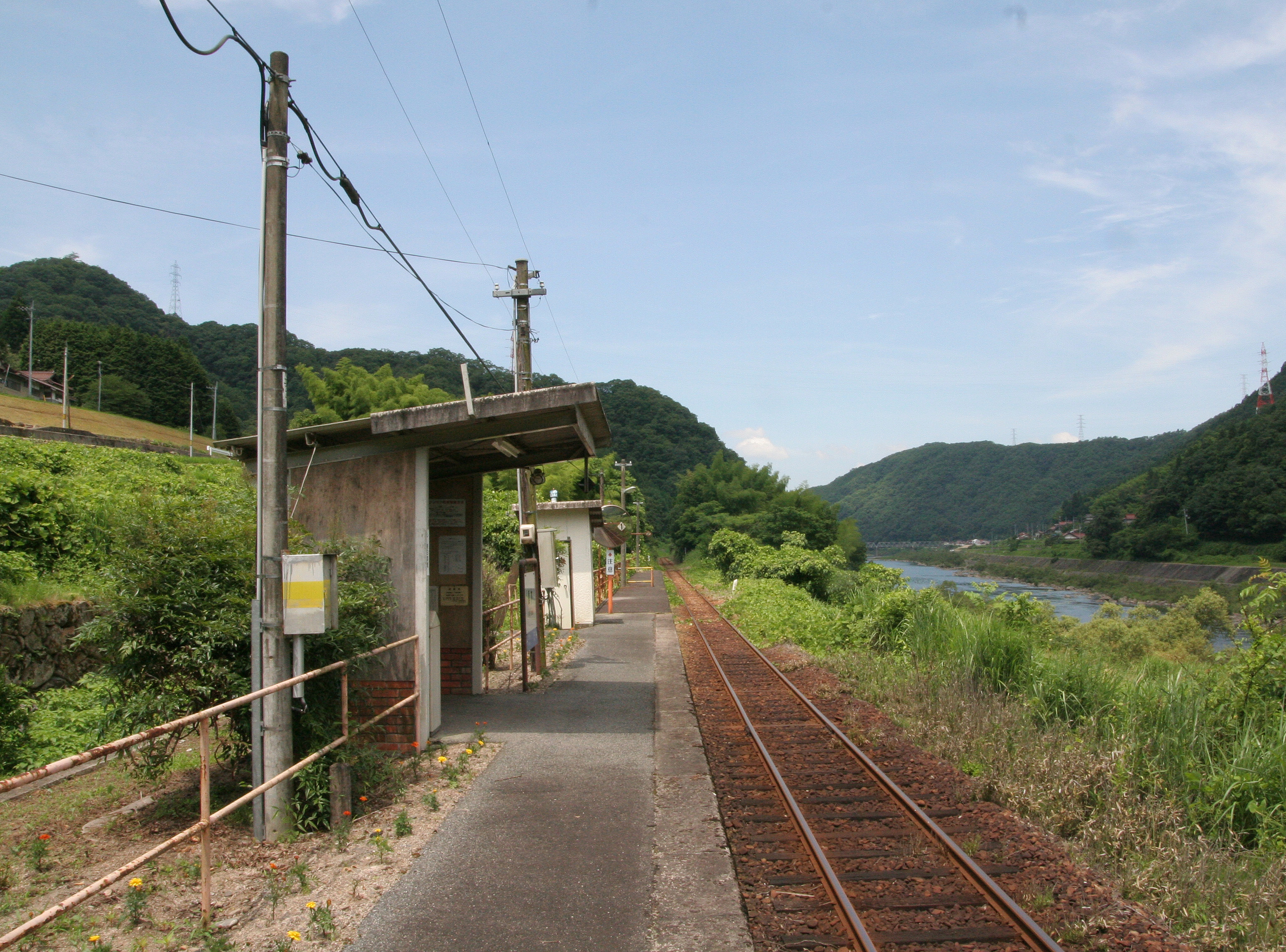
- Nobuki Station platform in July 2008

General information
- Location: 2163 Takamiya-chō Sasabe Nakanobuki, Akitakata （広島県安芸高田市高宮町佐々部中信木2163） Hiroshima Prefecture; Japan
- Coordinates: 34°48′47″N 132°43′49″E
- Operator: JR West
- Line: F Sankō Line
- Platforms: 1 side platform
- Tracks: 1

History
- Opened: 1956
- Closed: 2018
Location
- Location within Japan

Nobuki Station (信木駅, Nobuki-eki) was a railway station in Akitakata, Hiroshima Prefecture, Japan, operated by West Japan Railway Company (JR West).

== Lines ==
Nobuki Station was served by the 108.1 km Sankō Line from Gōtsu in Shimane Prefecture to Miyoshi in Hiroshima Prefecture, which closed on 31 March 2018.

== Adjacent stations ==
«	Service	»
Sankō Line
Shikijiki	Local	Tokorogi

== History ==
On 16 October 2015, JR West announced that it was considering closing the Sanko Line due to poor patronage. On 29 September 2016, JR West announced that the entire line would close on 31 March 2018. The line then closed on March 31, 2018, with an event hosted by JR West.

== See also ==
- List of railway stations in Japan
