= Mizuho, Shimane =

Dissolved municipality in Shimane prefecture, Japan

Mizuho (瑞穂町, Mizuho-chō) was a town located in Ōchi District, Shimane Prefecture, Japan.

As of 2003, the town had an estimated population of 5,180 and a density of 24.92 persons per km^{2}. The total area was 207.83 km^{2}.

On October 1, 2004, Mizuho, along with the town of Iwami, and the village of Hasumi (all from Ōchi District), was merged to create the town of Ōnan.
