= Ōchi, Shimane =

Municipality in Ōchi district, Shimane prefecture, Japan

Ōchi (邑智町, Ōchi-chō) was a town located in Ōchi District, Shimane Prefecture, Japan.

As of 2003, the town had an estimated population of 4,335 and a density of 23.32 persons per km^{2}. The total area was 185.89 km^{2}.

On October 1, 2004, Ōchi, along with the village of Daiwa (also from Ōchi District), was merged to create the town of Misato.

== Rivers and mountains ==
- Gōnokawa River
