= Kōyodo Station =

Railway station in Japan, 1963 to 2018

Kōyodo Station 香淀駅
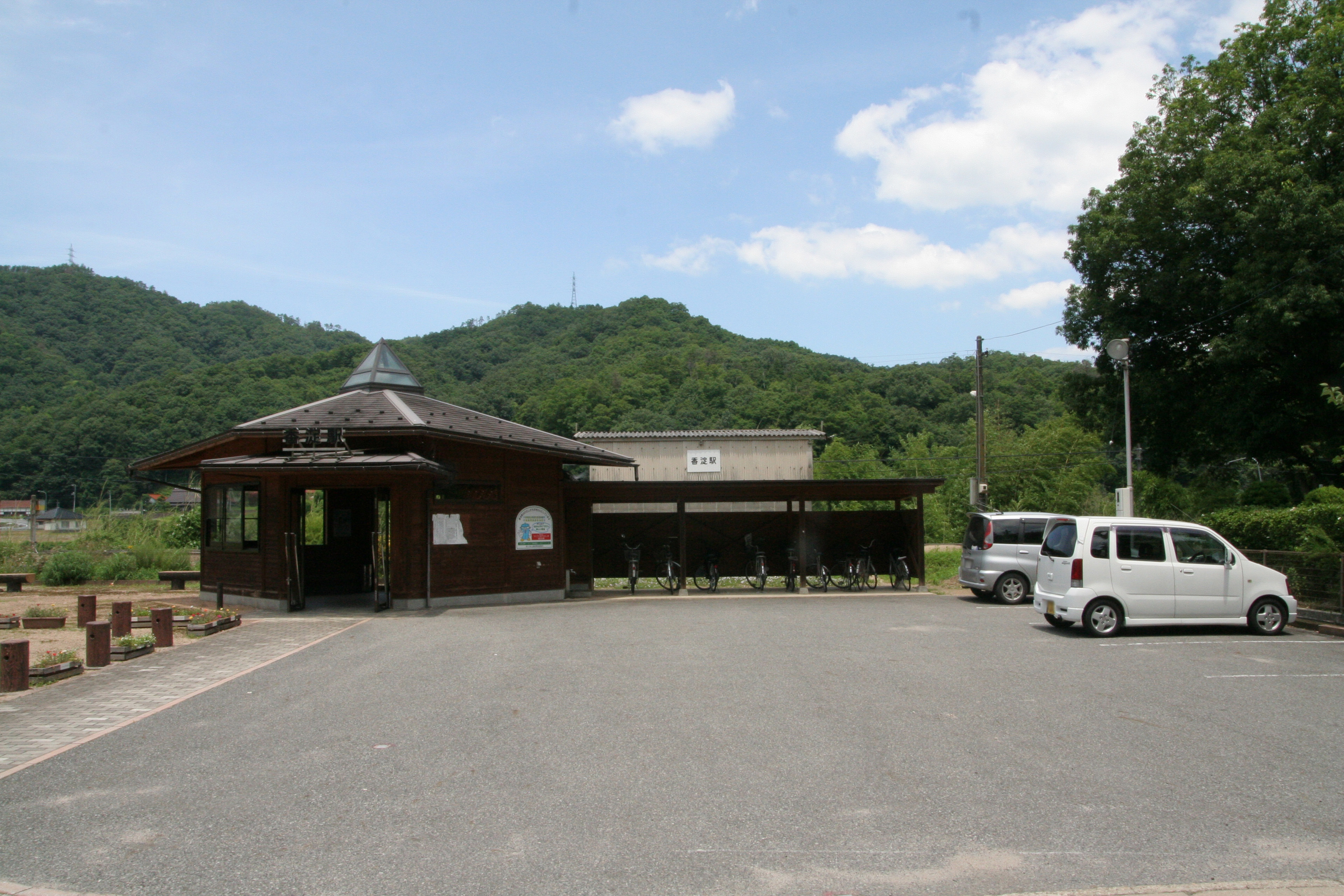
- Kōyodo Station in July 2008

General information
- Location: 89 Sakugi-chō Monde Aza Shimokumi, Miyoshi （広島県三次市作木町門田字下組89） Hiroshima Prefecture; Japan
- Coordinates: 34°49′38″N 132°42′49″E
- Operator: JR West
- Line: F Sankō Line
- Connections: Bus stop

History
- Opened: 1963
- Closed: 2018
Location
- Location within Japan

Kōyodo Station (香淀駅, Kōyodo-eki) was a railway station in Miyoshi, Hiroshima Prefecture, Japan, operated by West Japan Railway Company (JR West).

== Lines ==
Kōyodo Station was served by the 108.1 km Sankō Line from Gōtsu in Shimane Prefecture to Miyoshi in Hiroshima Prefecture, which closed on 31 March 2018.

== Adjacent stations ==
«	Service	»
Sankō Line
Sakugiguchi	Local	Shikijiki

== History ==
On 16 October 2015, JR West announced that it was considering closing the Sanko Line due to poor patronage. On 29 September 2016, JR West announced that the entire line would close on 31 March 2018. The line then closed on March 31, 2018, with an event hosted by JR West.

== See also ==
- List of railway stations in Japan
