= Daiwa, Shimane =

Village in Japan

Daiwa (大和村, Daiwa-mura) was a village in Ōchi District, Shimane Prefecture, Japan.

As of 2003 the village had an estimated population of 1,881 and a density of 19.39/km^{2} (50.2/sq mi). The total area was 97.03 km^{2} (37.46 sq mi).

On October 1, 2004, Daiwa was merged with the town of Ōchi (also from Ōchi District) to create the town of Misato.
