= Misato, Shimane =

Misato 美郷町
- Town
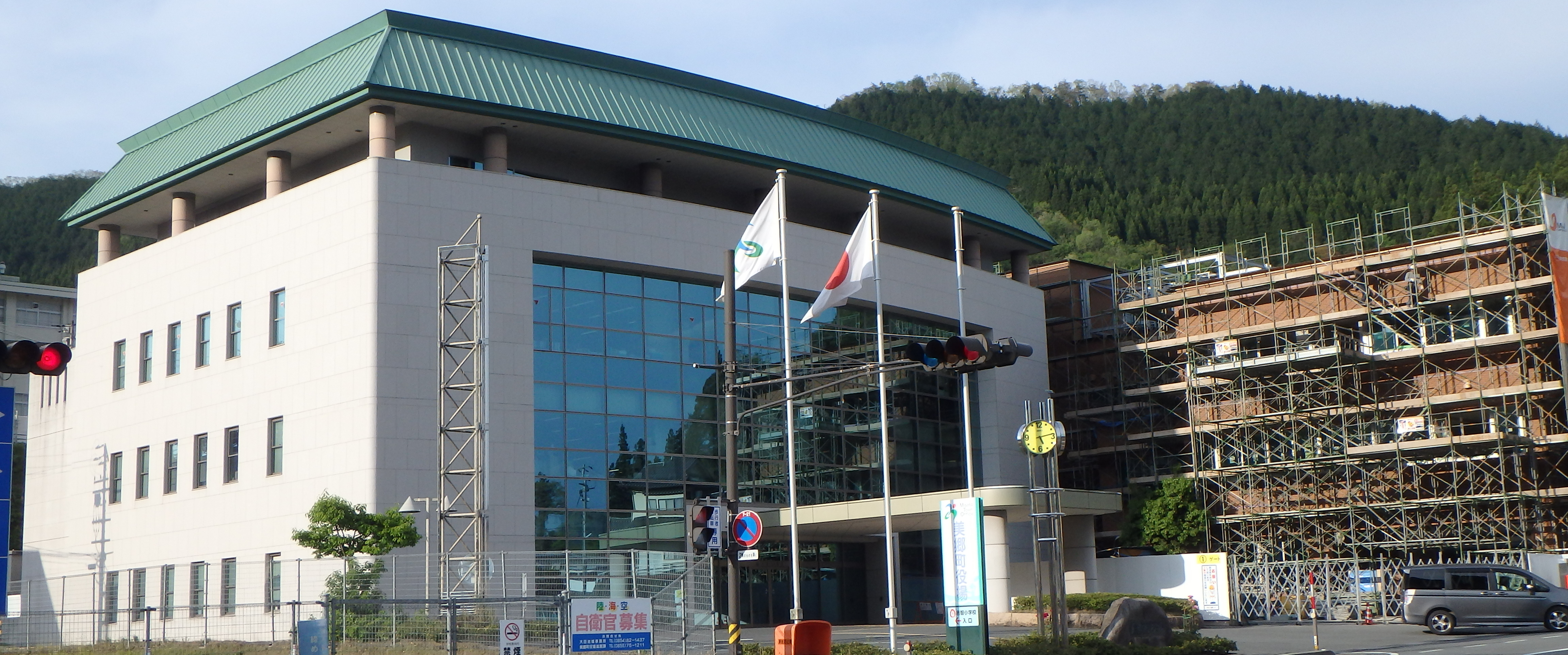
- Misato town hall

- Flag Emblem
- Interactive map of Misato
- Location in Japan
- Coordinates: 35°4′36″N 132°35′26″E
- Country: Japan
- Region: Chūgoku; San'in
- Prefecture: Shimane
- District: Ōchi

Area
  - Total: 282.92 km^{2} (109.24 sq mi)

Population (July 31, 2023)
  - Total: 4,355
  - Density: 15.39/km^{2} (39.87/sq mi)
- Time zone: UTC+09:00 (JST)
- City hall address: 168 Kasubuchi, Misato-cho, Ochi-gun, Shimane-ken 699-4692
- Website: Official website
- Symbols
- Flower: Rhododendron subg. Hymenanthes
- Tree: Prunus mume

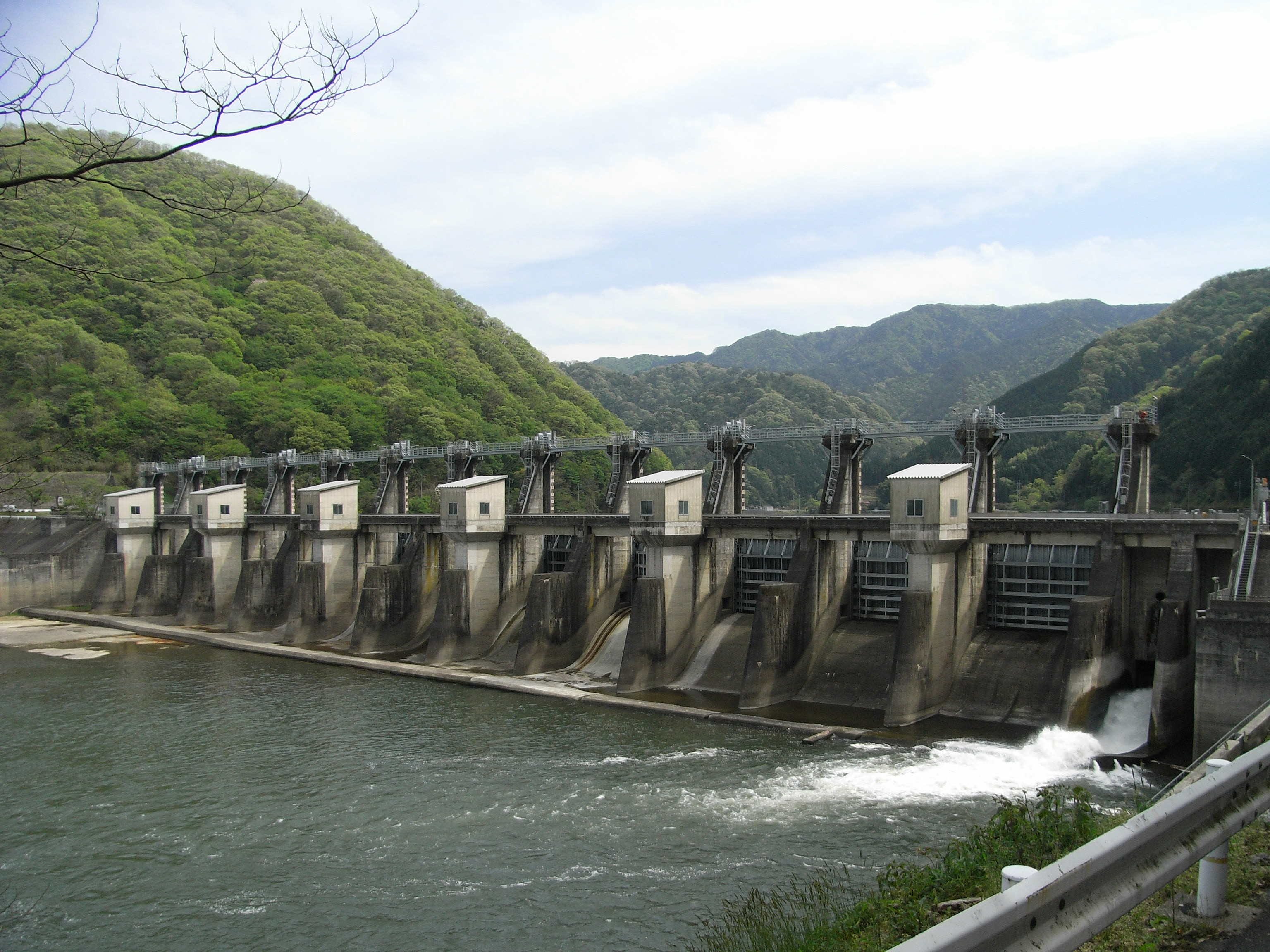
Hamahara Dam

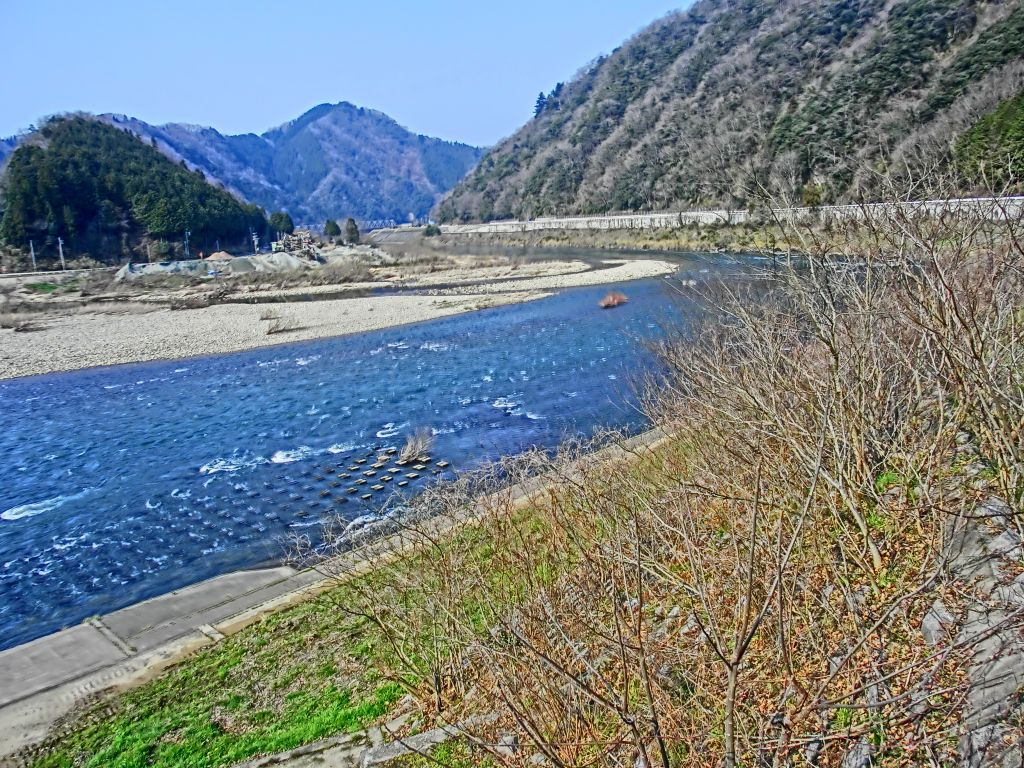
Enokawa River

Misato (美郷町, Misato-chō) is a town located in Ōchi District, Shimane Prefecture, Japan. As of 31 July 2023, the town had an estimated population of 4,355 in 1844 households and a population density of 15 persons per km^{2}. The total area of the town is 282.92 square kilometres (109.24 sq mi).

== Geography ==
Misato is located in central Shimane, in the Chugoku Mountains bordered by Hiroshima Prefecture to the south. The Enokawa River runs through the town.

=== Climate ===
Misato has a humid subtropical climate (Köppen Cfa) characterized by warm summers and cool winters with light to no snowfall. The average annual temperature in Misato is 13.4 °C. The average annual rainfall is 1711 mm with September as the wettest month. The temperatures are highest on average in August, at around 25.0 °C, and lowest in January, at around 2.4 °C.

== Demographics ==
Per Japanese census data, the population of Misato has been decreasing and is now only a third of what it was 50 years ago.

Historical population
Year	Pop.	±%
1970	15,460	—
1980	10,494	−32.1%
1990	8,838	−15.8%
2000	7,606	−13.9%
2010	6,624	−12.9%
2020	5,351	−19.2%

== Neighboring municipalities ==
Hiroshima Prefecture

- Miyoshi

Shimane Prefecture

- Iinan
- Kawamoto
- Ōda
- Ōnan

== History ==
The area of Misato was part of ancient Iwami Province. During the Edo Period, the area was tenryō or direct territory of the Tokugawa shogunate, administered together with the Iwami Ginzan Silver Mine. Kasubuchi, the center of Misato Town, is located at the point where the Enokawa River, which flows northward in the Chugoku Mountains, bends and flows westward, and has prospered as a key point for boat transport on the Enogawa River. After the Meiji restoration, villages were established within Ōchi District, Shimane on April 1, 1889, with the creation of the modern municipalities system. The town of Misato was formed on October 1, 2004, from the merger of the village of Daiwa and the town of Ōchi.

== Government ==
Misato has a mayor-council form of government with a directly elected mayor and a unicameral town council of 12 members. Misato, collectively with the towns of Kawamoto and Ōnan, contributes one member to the Shimane Prefectural Assembly. In terms of national politics, the town is part of the Shimane 2nd district of the lower house of the Diet of Japan.

== Economy ==
Misato is a very rural area, with an economy based on agriculture and forestry.

== Education ==
Misato has two public elementary school and two public junior high schools operated by the town government. The town does not have a high school

== Transportation ==
=== Railway ===
Following the closure of the JR West Sankō Line on April 1, 2018, Misato no longer has any passenger railway service. The nearest train station is Gōtsu Station on the JR West San'in Main Line.

JR West - Sankō Line

- Take - Onbara - Iwami-Yanaze - Akatsuka - Kasubuchi - Hamahara - Sawadani - Ushio - Iwami-Matsubara - Iwami Tsuga

=== Highways ===
- National Route 184
- National Route 375
