= Iwami, Shimane =

Dissolved municipality in Shimane prefecture, Japan

Iwami (石見町, Iwami-chō) was a town located in Ōchi District, Shimane Prefecture, Japan.

As of 2003, the town had an estimated population of 6,337 and a density of 46.13 persons per km^{2}. The total area was 137.36 km^{2}.

On October 1, 2004, Iwami, along with the town of Mizuho, and the village of Hasumi (all from Ōchi District), was merged to create the town of Ōnan.

== History ==
The name Iwami also refers to a region of Shimane Prefecture which makes up the South/West half of the prefecture.

Iwami Airport in Masuda is a 2 or 3 hour drive from Ōnan.
