= Shikijiki Station =

Former railway station in Akitakata, Hiroshima prefecture, Japan

Shikijiki Station 式敷駅
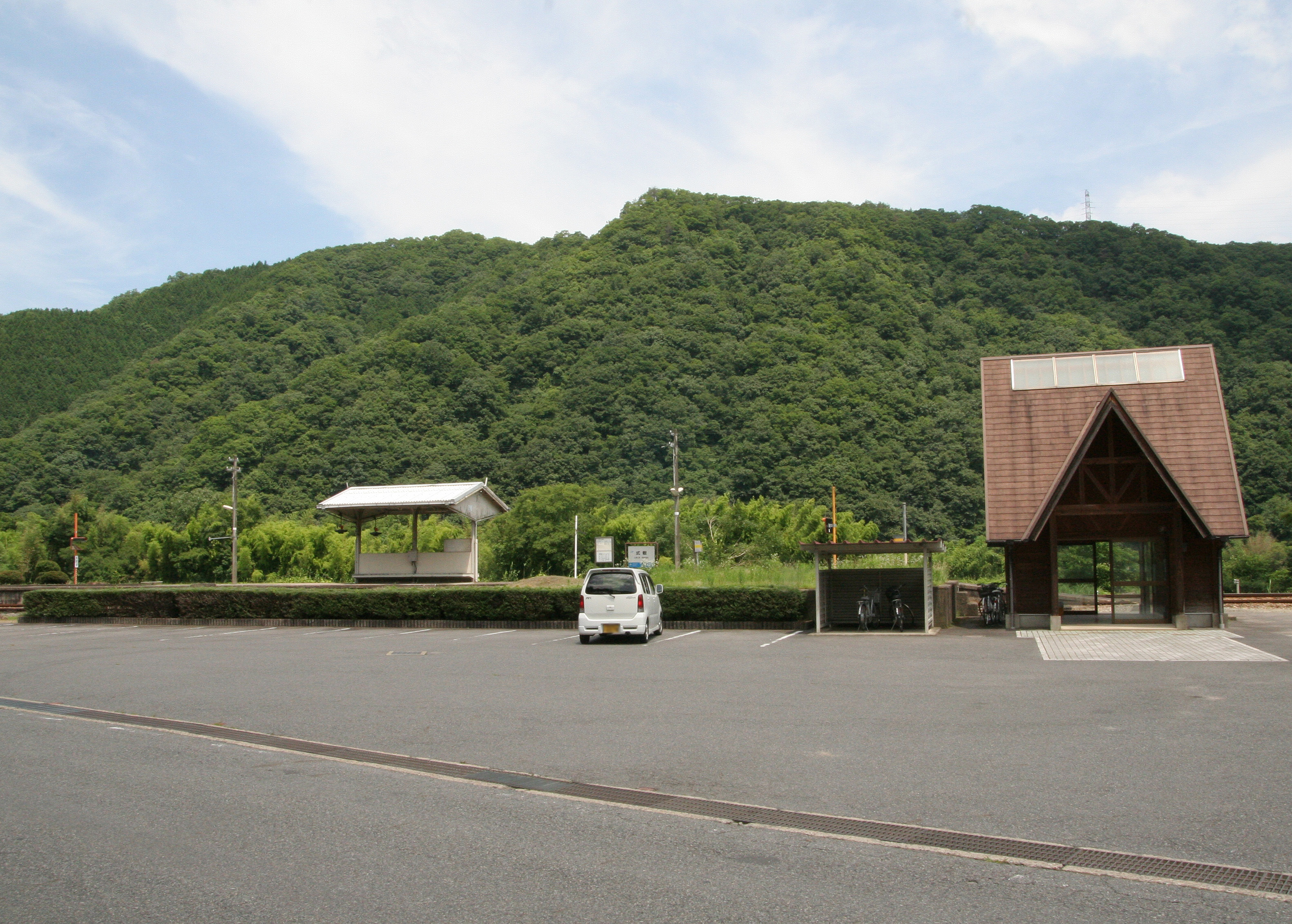
- Shikijiki Station in July 2008

General information
- Location: 2438 Takamiya-chō Sasabe Nanatani, Akitakata （広島県安芸高田市高宮町佐々部七谷2438） Hiroshima Prefecture; Japan
- Coordinates: 34°48′57″N 132°42′46″E
- Operator: JR West
- Line: F Sankō Line
- Connections: Bus stop

History
- Opened: 1955
- Closed: 2018
Location
- Location within Japan

Shikijiki Station (式敷駅, Shikijiki-eki) was a railway station in Akitakata, Hiroshima Prefecture, Japan, operated by West Japan Railway Company (JR West).

== Lines ==
Shikijiki Station was served by the 108.1 km Sankō Line from Gōtsu in Shimane Prefecture to Miyoshi in Hiroshima Prefecture, which closed on 31 March 2018.

== Adjacent stations ==
«	Service	»
Sankō Line
Kōyodo	Local	Nobuki

== History ==
On 16 October 2015, JR West announced that it was considering closing the Sanko Line due to poor ridership. On 29 September 2016, JR West announced that the entire line would close on 31 March 2018. The line then closed on March 31, 2018, with an event hosted by JR West.

== See also ==
- List of railway stations in Japan
