= Hasumi, Shimane =

Hasumi 羽須美村
- Village
- Flag Seal
- Interactive map of Hasumi
- Country: Japan
- Region: Chūgoku (San'in)
- Prefecture: Shimane
- District: Ōchi
- Merged: October 1, 2004

Area
  - Total: 74.03 km^{2} (28.58 sq mi)

Population (2004)
  - Total: 1,947
  - Density: 26.30/km^{2} (68.12/sq mi)

Hasumi (羽須美村, Hasumi-mura) was a village located in Ōchi District, Shimane Prefecture, Japan.

== Description ==
As of 2003, the village had an estimated population of 1,965 and a density of 26.54 persons per km^{2}. The total area was 74.03 km^{2}.

== History ==
On October 1, 2004, Hasumi, along with the towns of Iwami and Mizuho (all from Ōchi District), was merged to create the town of Ōnan.
