= Ikawashi Station =

Former railway station in Miyoshi, Japan

Ikawashi Station 伊賀和志駅
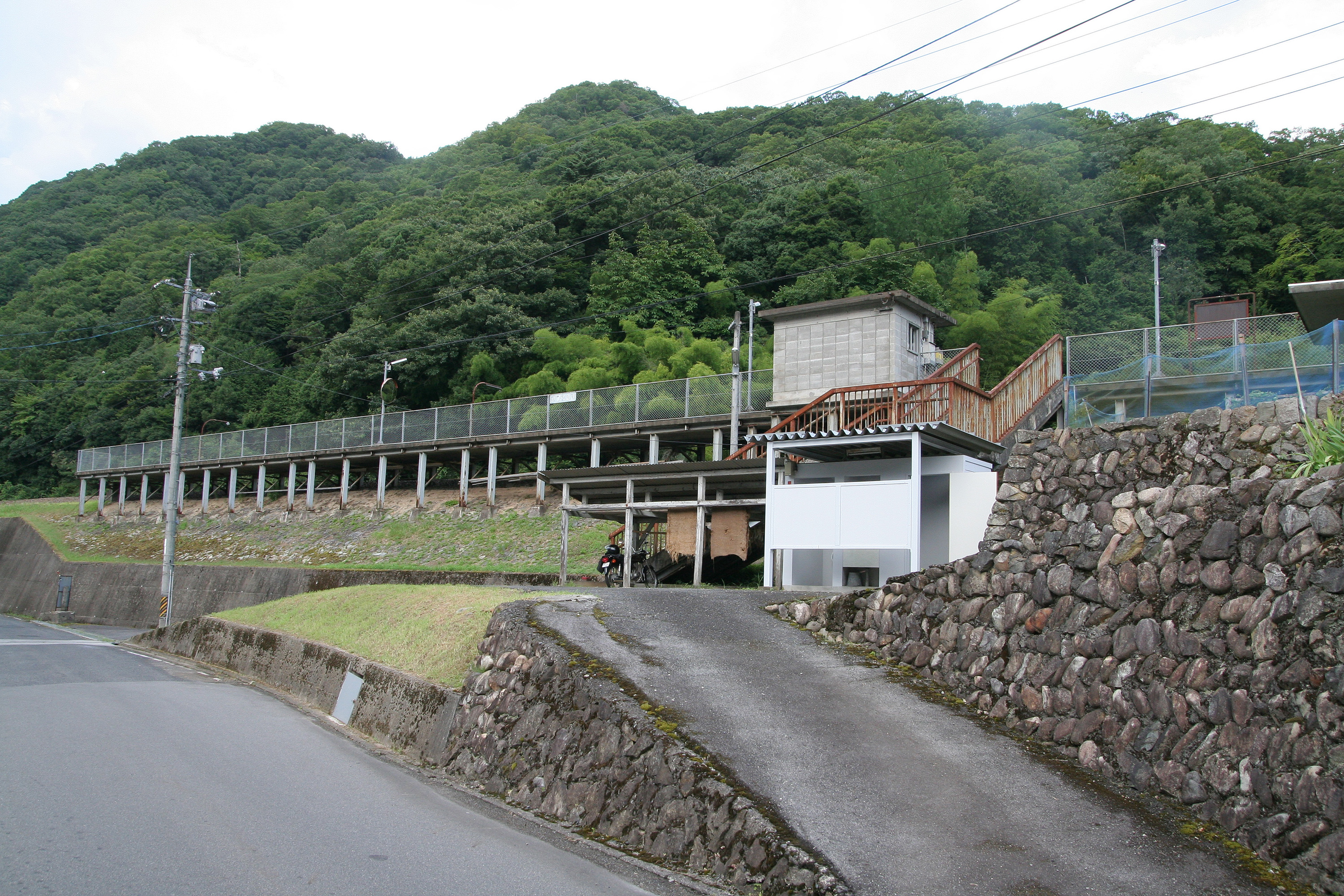
- Ikawashi Station in July 2008

General information
- Location: 214 Sakugi-chō Ikawashi, Miyoshi （広島県三次市作木町伊賀和志214） Hiroshima Prefecture; Japan
- Coordinates: 34°53′42″N 132°39′40″E
- Operator: JR West
- Line: F Sankō Line
- Connections: Bus stop

History
- Opened: 1975
- Closed: 2018
Location
- Location within Japan

Ikawashi Station (伊賀和志駅, Ikawashi-eki) was a railway station in Miyoshi, Hiroshima Prefecture, Japan, operated by West Japan Railway Company (JR West). Opened in 1975, the station closed on 31 March 2018 with the closure of the entire Sanko Line.

== Lines ==
Ikawashi Station was served by the 108.1 km Sankō Line from Gōtsu in Shimane Prefecture to Miyoshi in Hiroshima Prefecture, which closed on 31 March 2018.

== Adjacent stations ==
«	Service	»
Sankō Line
Uzui	Local	Kuchiba

== History ==
On 16 October 2015, JR West announced that it was considering closing the Sanko Line due to poor patronage. On 29 September 2016, JR West announced that the entire line would close on 31 March 2018. The line then closed on March 31, 2018, with an event hosted by JR West.

== See also ==
- List of railway stations in Japan
