= Ōchi District, Shimane =

District in Shimane Prefecture, Japan

Coordinates: 34.921°N 132.513°E

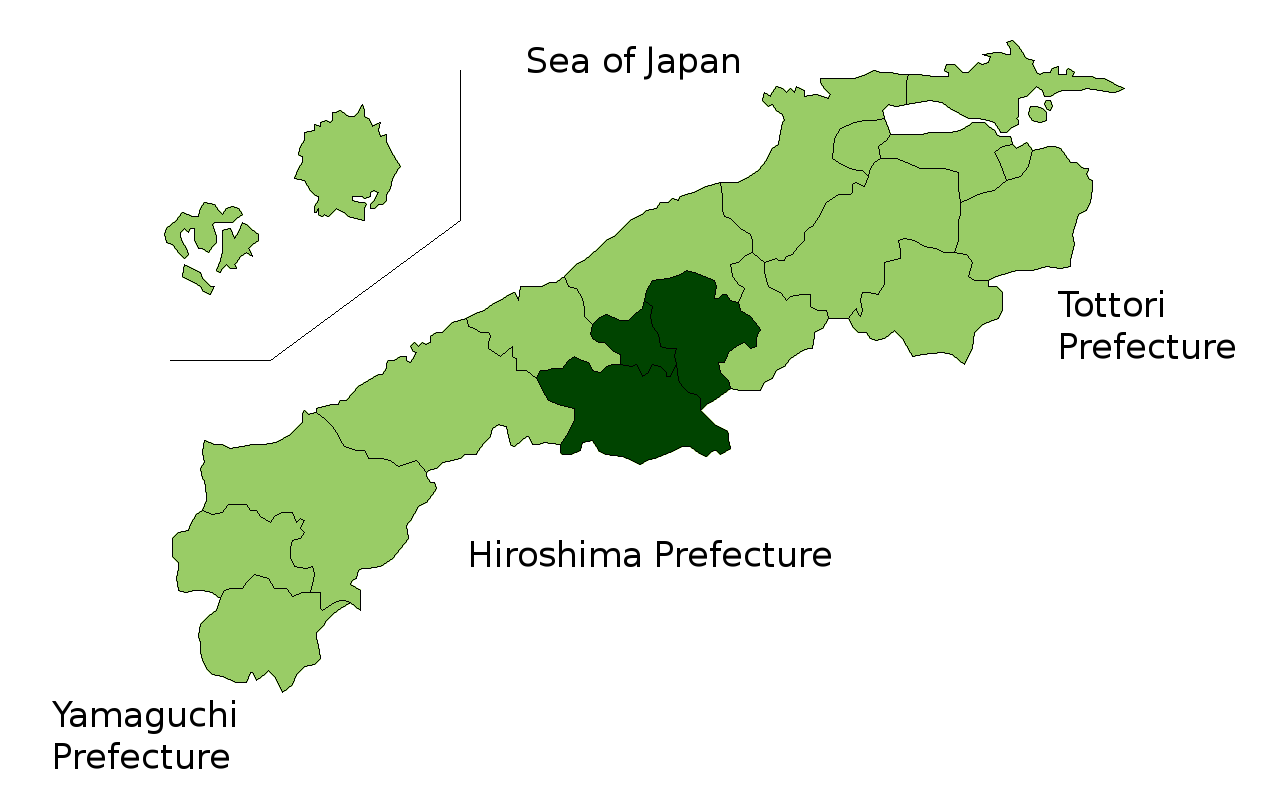
Location of Ōchi District in Shimane Prefecture

Ōchi (邑智郡, Ōchi-gun) is a district located in Shimane Prefecture, Japan.

As of 2003, the district has an estimated population of 27,648 and a density of 30.10 persons per km^{2}. The total area is 918.63 km^{2}.

== Towns and villages ==
- Kawamoto
- Misato
- Ōnan

== Mergers ==
- On October 1, 2004, the towns of Iwami and Mizuho, and the village of Hasumi merged to form the new town of Ōnan.
- On October 1, 2004, the town of Ōchi, and the village of Daiwa merged to form the new town of Misato.
- On October 1, 2004, the town of Sakurae merged into the city of Gōtsu.
