= JCAS Airways =

JCAS Airways ジェイキャス・エアウェイズ Jeikyasu Eaaueizu
IATA	ICAO	Call sign
-	-	-
- Founded: 21 June 2023; 3 years ago
- Operating bases: Hagi-Iwami Airport; Kansai International Airport
- Headquarters: Chiyoda, Tokyo, Japan
- Key people: Seiji Shirane CEO; Yuki Umemoto CEO
- Founder: Seiji Shirane
- Website: https://www.jcas.co.jp/

JCAS Airways Co, Ltd (株式会社ジェイキャスエアウェイズ) is a Japanese startup airline established originally in 2018, with plans on operating flights out of Kansai International Airport to regional airports serving the Hokuriku region and San'in region. Specifically, the first airports the airline plans to serve are Toyama Airport and Yonago Kitaro Airport. The airline plans to operate ATR 72-600 turboprop aircraft, similar to Niigata startup airline Toki Air. The launch for the airline was initially aimed at autumn 2021, however that timeline has been delayed with the current expected commencing of flight operations in spring 2026.

== History ==
After a career at Japan Airlines between April 1975 and May 1997, being involved in the successful launch of Skymark Airlines in 2001 and creating the aviation consulting firm 'Conobby's Consulting Co., Ltd', founder and current CEO, Seiji Shirane established 'JCAS Corporation' in October 2018. After the initial route selection was announced in 2019, the airline's target was to launch by autumn 2021. However, that timeline has since been delayed, one of the largest contributing factors being the COVID-19 pandemic. The company then officially rebranded to 'JCAS Airways Co, Ltd' in 2023 due to changes in the management systems, resulting in the co-representative CEO position as is current within the company.

In a statement made by Seiji Shirane, he pointed out that the current aviation infrastructure, which is centered around Haneda Airport, is insufficient to connect the Kansai region and Chūbu region. Furthermore, in case of natural disasters, Shirane mentions the importance of having other means of transportation than the existing rail network.

The launch of the airline has since been further delayed with expected start of operations in the spring of 2026. Working currently to accelerate the startup process for the airline as well as submitting for a license from the Ministry of Land, Infrastructure, Transport and Tourism and setting up local offices within the airports it will operate to.

== Destinations ==
The airline plans to operate flights out of Kansai International Airport to regional airports serving the Hokuriku region and San'in region with current airports being Toyama Airport and Yonago Kitaro Airport. Besides Kansai International Airport, the airline has also announced plans to operate flights out of Iwami Airport among others which have yet to be confirmed.

The airline expects to fly to the following airports starting spring 2026:

Region	Prefecture	City	Airport	Notes	Refs	Information
Chūbu region	Toyama Prefecture	Toyama	Toyama Airport	Planned		
Chūgoku region	Shimane Prefecture	Masuda	Iwami Airport	Base		Second base, expected to open later into airline operation<
Chūgoku region	Tottori Prefecture	Yonago	Yonago Kitaro Airport	Planned		
Kansai region	Osaka Prefecture	Osaka	Kansai International Airport	Base		Initial operating base for the airline

== Fleet ==
=== Current fleet ===
As of July 2024, JCAS Airways operates the following aircraft:

Aircraft Type	In fleet	Orders	Passengers		Notes
Aircraft Type	In fleet	Orders	Y	Total	Notes
ATR 72-600	0	1	72	72	LOI for one aircraft signed
Total	0	1			

At the Farnborough International Airshow 2024 JCAS Airways signed a Letter of intent (LOI) for a single ATR 72-600 aircraft from Singapore-based aircraft lessor Avation PLC.

The current plan for the airline is to expand the fleet to a total of seven aircraft and operate 16 different routes within five years of flight operations commencing.
