= Ōmoto Kofun =

Ōmoto Kofun Cluster
- 大元古墳群 (Japanese)
- Ōmoto Kofun Cluster Ōmoto Kofun (Japan)
- 34°42′5.77″N 131°52′4.16″E
- Type: kofun
- Periods: Kofun period
- Location: Masuda, Shimane, Japan
- Region: San'in

History
- Built: 4th century AD

Site notes
- Elevation: 10 m (33 ft)
- Public access: Yes
- National Historic Site of Japan

The Ōmoto Kofun Cluster (大元古墳群, Ōmoto Kofun-gun) is a group of Kofun period burial mounds located in the Toda-chō neighborhood of the city of Masuda, Shimane Prefecture in the San'in region of Japan. The cluster was designated a National Historic Site in 2020.

== Overview ==
The Ōmoto Kofun cluster is located on a hilly ridge to the east of Masuda city in the western part of Shimane Prefecture. A survey was conducted from 1986 to 1988 and an archaeological excavation from 2015, confirming that the cluster consists of three ancient tumuli. The Ōmoto No.1 Kofun is a zenpō-kōen-fun (前方後円墳), which is shaped like a keyhole, having one square end and one circular end, when viewed from above. With a length of 88 meters, it is one of the largest kofun in the Iwami region. It is orientated to the southwest and there is a ceremonial platform protruding from the north side of the mound. The posterior circular portion is 50 meters in diameter and seven meters in height and was constructed in four tiers. The anterior rectangular portion is 31 meters wide at the end and 24 meters at the construction, and 4.3 meters high and was constructed in two tiers. Rows of cylindrical haniwa and fukiishi were found on the surface, but no trace of moat was found. Based on the mound shape and excavated haniwa, it is estimated to have been built between the end of the 4th century and the beginning of the 5th century, or slightly earlier than the Sukumozuka Kofun. The Ōmoto No.2 Kofun is a round enpun (円墳) style burial mound, and is located adjacent to the front part of the Ōmoto No.1 Kofun. It has a diameter of 15 meters and is 1.2 meters high. Ōmoto No.3 Kofun is also a round enpun-style mound. It has a diameter of 12 meters and is located to the west of the Ōmoto No.2 Kofun.

The tumuli were designated a Shimane Prefectural Historic Sites in 1999, their status was elevated to a National Historic Sites in 2020. The site is located approximately ten minutes by car from Masuda Station JR West San'in Main Line.

== See also ==
- List of Historic Sites of Japan (Shimane)
