= Nakazu-Higashihara Site =

Nakasu Higashibaru site
- 中須東原遺跡 (Japanese)
- Nakasu Higashibaru site Nakazu-Higashihara Site (Japan)
- Interactive map of Nakasu Higashibaru site
- 34°40′30″N 131°50′34″E
- Type: settlement
- Periods: late Heian to Sengoku period
- Location: Masuda, Shimane, Japan
- Region: San'in region

Site notes
- Public access: Yes (no facilities)

The Nakasu Higashihara Site (中須東原遺跡, Nakasu Higashihara iseki) is an archaeological site with traces of a medieval settlement and port located in the Nakasu neighborhood of the city of Masuda, Shimane, in the San'in region of Japan. The site was designated a National Historic Site of Japan in 2014 with the area under protection expanded in 2016 and 2020.

== Overview ==
The Nakasu Higashibaru site developed around a port located in a low swamp behind the sand dunes on the left bank of the estuary of the Masuda River western Shimane Prefecture. It was discovered prior to a land reclamation project in 2004, and from 2004 to 2011, fourteen rounds of archaeological excavations have determined that the remains of the medieval port and settlement remained in good condition. The settlement area extended approximately 250 meters from east-to-west by 130 meters north-to-south and consists of the foundations of multiple pillar-supported buildings, blacksmith furnaces, iron slag disposal sites, graves, and roads, along with a large-scale gravel boat dock, with a length of 40 meters and width of 10 meters. This dock was made by laying fist-sized to human-head-sized gravel on a gentle slope along the shoreline of a lagoon. Artifacts date the settlement from the middle of the 12th century. It expanded in the latter half of the 12th century, but it is known to have been once abandoned, and redeveloped in the 14th century, after which it survived until the 16th century. Trade ceramics predominate among the excavated relics, including Chinese ceramics, Korean ceramics and also Thai ceramics and Annamese ceramics, indicating that this was the center of long-distance trade.

The Masuda clan occupied this area from the Kenkyū era (1190-1198) of the early Kamakura period, until shortly after the 1600 Battle of Sekigahara. The early period of the ruins thus predates the Masuda occupation; however, the later redevelopment from the 14th century, corresponds to the height of Masuda rule. Surviving documents of the Masuda clan includes numerous mentions of maritime trade, and several references to the Nakasu port. In 1568, the Masuda clan is recorded as having presented the Mōri clan with several Siberian tiger pelts from Korea, and a large amount of contemporary Korean ceramics has been found at the Nakasu site.

== See also ==
- List of Historic Sites of Japan (Shimane)
