= Sukumozuka Kofun =

- スクモ塚古墳 (Japanese)
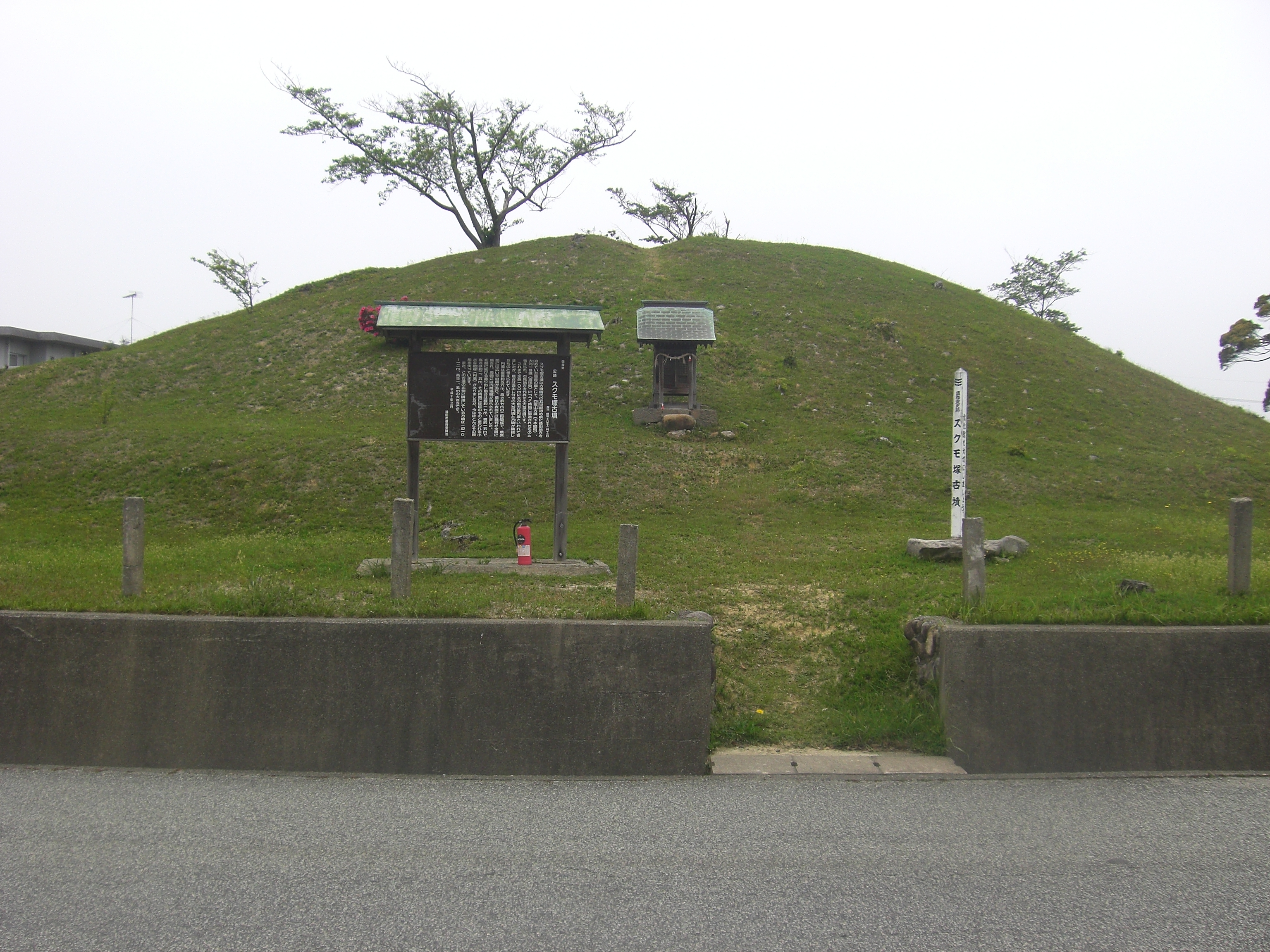
- Sukumozuka Kofun

- Sukumozuka Kofun Sukumozuka Kofun (Japan)
- Interactive map of Sukumozuka Kofun
- 34°42′4.09″N 131°50′54.21″E
- Type: Kofun
- Periods: Kofun period
- Location: Masuda, Shimane, Japan
- Region: San'in region

History
- Built: c.late 45th century

Site notes
- Public access: Yes (no facilities)

The Sukumozuka Kofun (スクモ塚古墳) is a Kofun period keyhole-shaped burial mound, located in the Kugi neighborhood of the city of Masuda, Shimane in the San'in region of Japan. The tumulus was designated a National Historic Site of Japan in 1941. It is the largest in the Iwami region and the largest in Shimane prefecture.

== Overview ==
The Sukumozuka Kofun is located in the Kushiro Hills at an elevation of about 40 meters near the Masuda River. For more than a dozen centuries after its construction, it was overgrown with vegetation and looked like a thicket of trees. It was discovered in 1939 by local historian Yatomi Kumaichirō and from 1941, it was excavated and surveyed by Ueda Sanpei, a prominent Ministry of Education commissioner who excavated the Heijō Palace and Toro Ruins. It was designated as a National Historic Site on December 13 of the same year as a large circular enpun (円墳) burial mound; however, the designation was immediately controversial as many archaeologists argued that it was a zenpō-kōen-fun (前方後円墳), which is shaped like a keyhole, having one square end and one circular end, when viewed from above, or else a zenpō-kōhō-fun (前方後方墳) shaped like two co-joined rectangles. The issue was only settled in October 2022, when the Masuda City Board of Education announced that findings confirmed the Sukumozuka Kofun to be a keyhole-shaped burial mound.

The tumulus has a total length of 100 meters, the diameter of the posterior round mound is about 47 meters with a height from its surroundings of seven meters. The surface of the tumulus is covered with fukiishi, the size of a human head, and had two rows of cylindrical haniwa. There is a 17 x 15 meter square structure on the north side of the circular portion, presumably a ceremonial platform. The anterior portion is 19 meters wide at the neck, 29 meters wide at the end, and 2.5 meters high on the north side.

There were formerly small circular baizuka accompanying tumuli on both sides of the main mound. The mounds were ten meters in diameter with a height of 2.6 meters, but the ones on the east side have disappeared, and the ones on the west side have hardly preserved their original shape.

Judging from the size and style of the kofun, it is believed to have been built from the end of the early to early middle Kofun period (late 4th century), and to be the tomb of the chieftain who ruled the Masuda region. It is located about 15 minutes by bus from the JR West Masuda Station.

== See also ==
- List of Historic Sites of Japan (Shimane)
