= Iwami Art Museum =

- 島根県立石見美術館
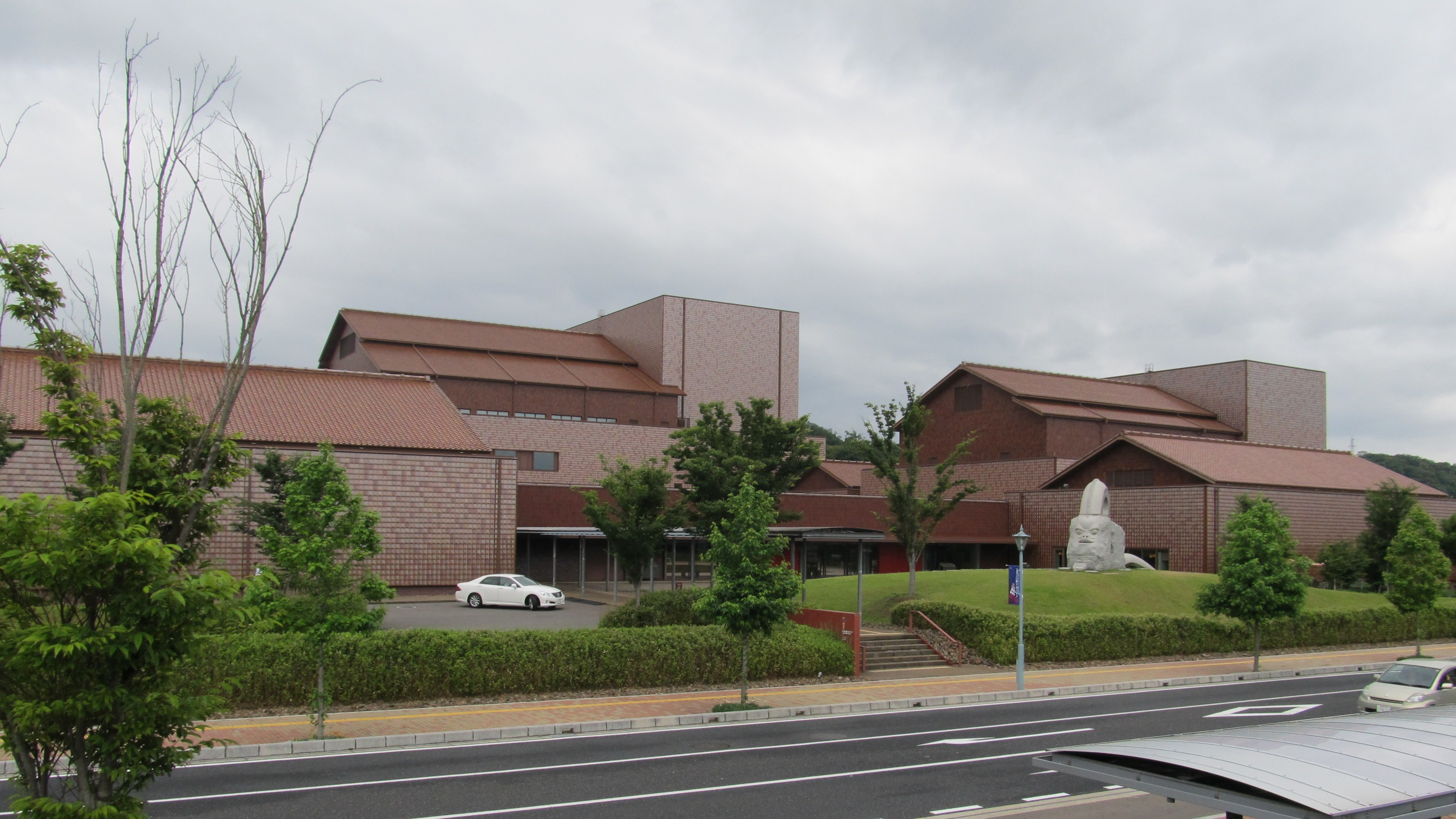
- Grand Toit
- Interactive map of the Iwami Art Museum area

General information
- Location: 5-15 Ariake-chō, Masuda, Shimane Prefecture, Japan
- Coordinates: 34°40′23″N 131°50′53″E
- Opened: 8 October 2005

Website
- Official website

Iwami Art Museum (島根県立石見美術館, Shimane Kenritsu Iwami Bijutsukan) opened in Masuda, Shimane Prefecture, Japan, in 2005. Together with Iwami Arts Theatre (島根県立いわみ芸術劇場) it forms part of the Shimane Arts Centre (島根県芸術文化センター), also known as Grand Toit (グラントワ), the French for "large roof". The collection includes works by Kanō Shōei (狩野松栄), Unkoku Tōgan, Kuroda Seiki, Fujishima Takeji, Okada Saburōsuke, and Kishida Ryūsei.

== See also ==
- List of Cultural Properties of Japan - paintings (Shimane)
- List of Historic Sites of Japan (Shimane)
- List of Museums in Shimane Prefecture
