= Masuda, Shimane =

Masuda 益田市
- City
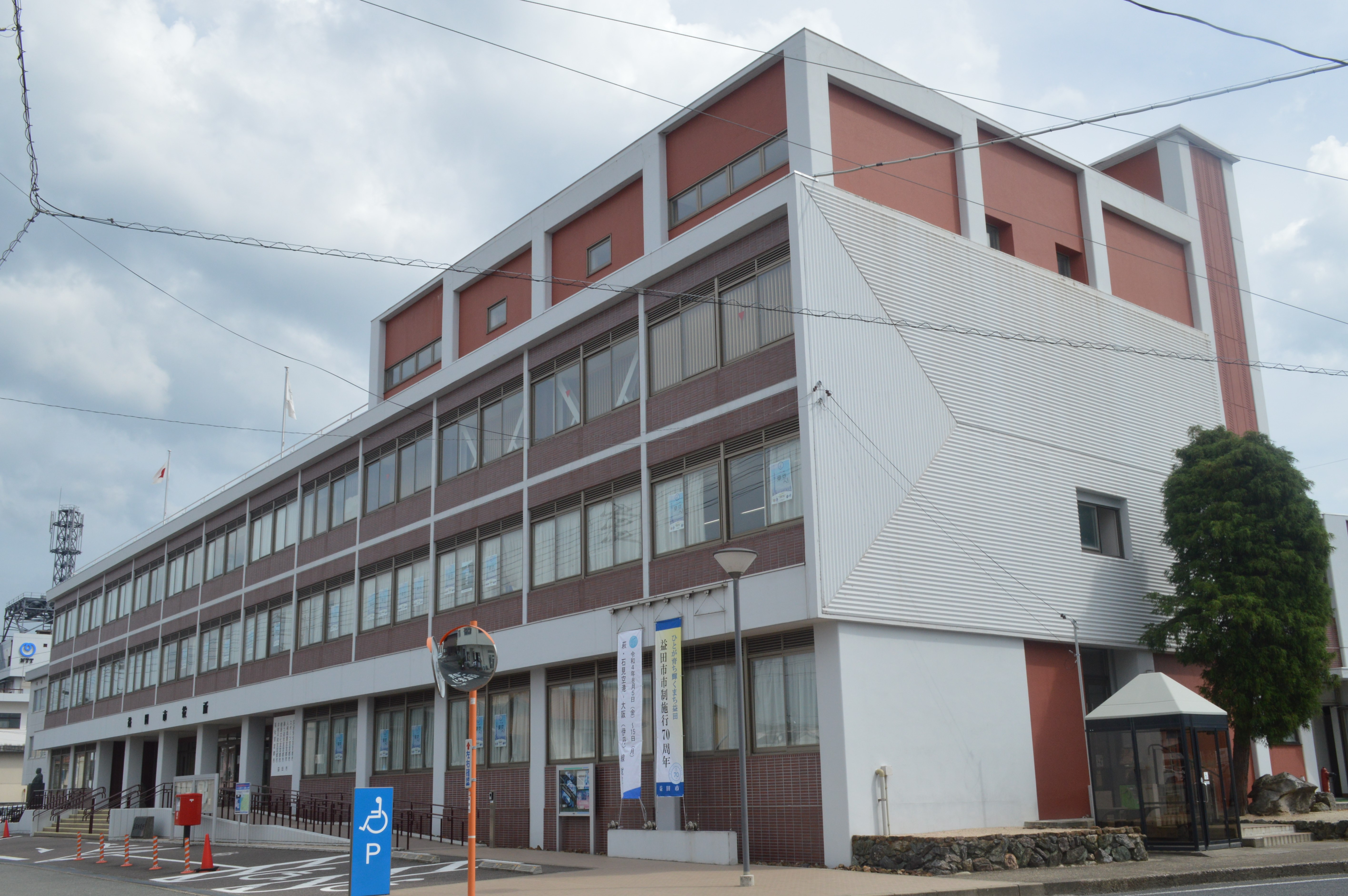
- Masuda City Hall

- Flag Emblem
- Interactive map of Masuda
- Location in Japan
- Coordinates: 34°40′29″N 131°50′34″E
- Country: Japan
- Region: Chūgoku (San'in)
- Prefecture: Shimane

Government
  - Mayor: Hiroaki Yamamoto (since August 2012)

Area
  - Total: 733.19 km^{2} (283.09 sq mi)

Population (July 31, 2023)
  - Total: 43,885
  - Density: 59.855/km^{2} (155.02/sq mi)
- Time zone: UTC+09:00 (JST)
- City hall address: 1-1, Tokiwa-chō, Masuda-shi, Shimane-ken 698-8650
- Climate: Cfa
- Website: Official website
- Symbols
- Flower: Narcissus
- Tree: Keyaki

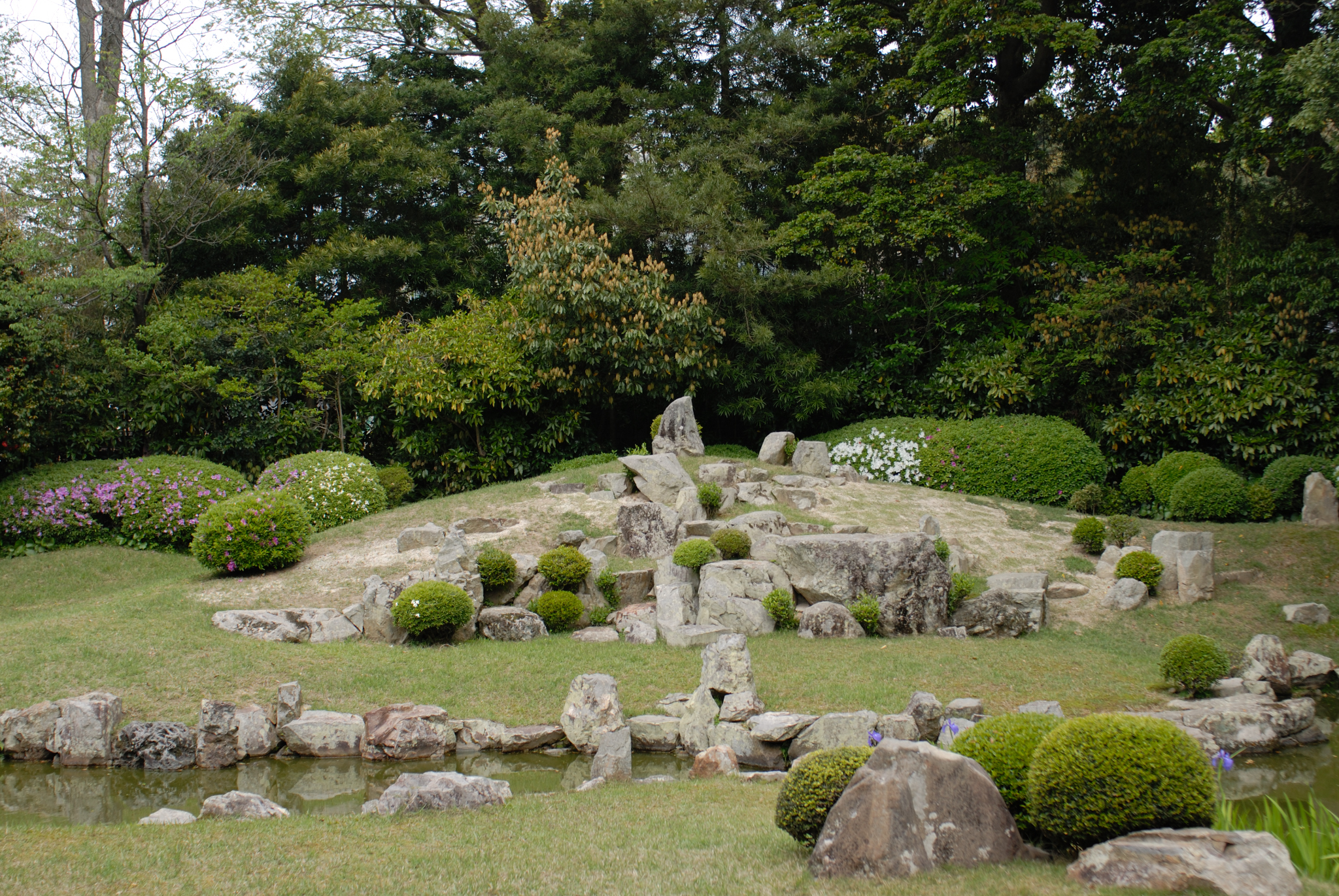
Gardens at Manpuku-ji

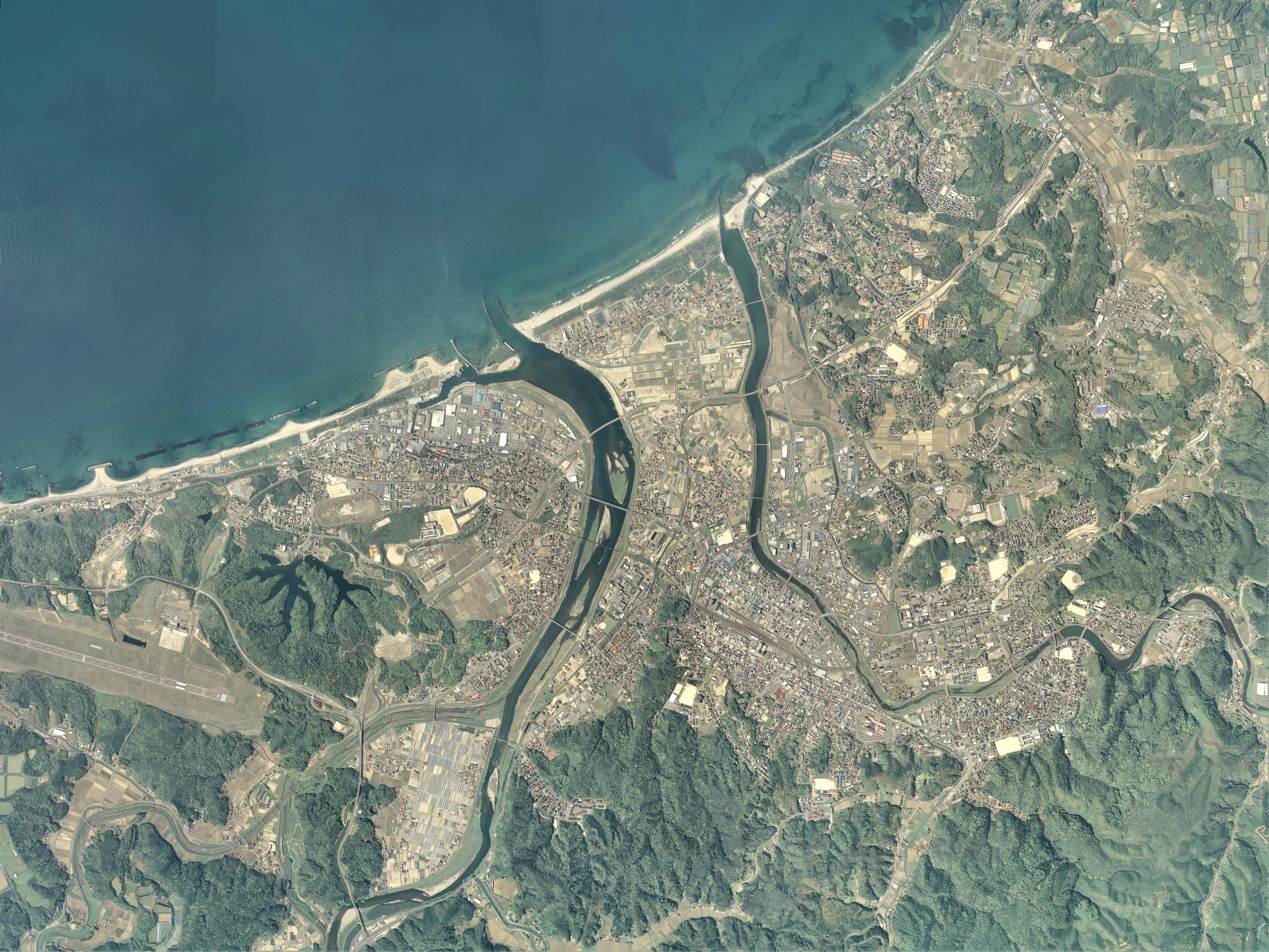
Aerial view of central Masuda

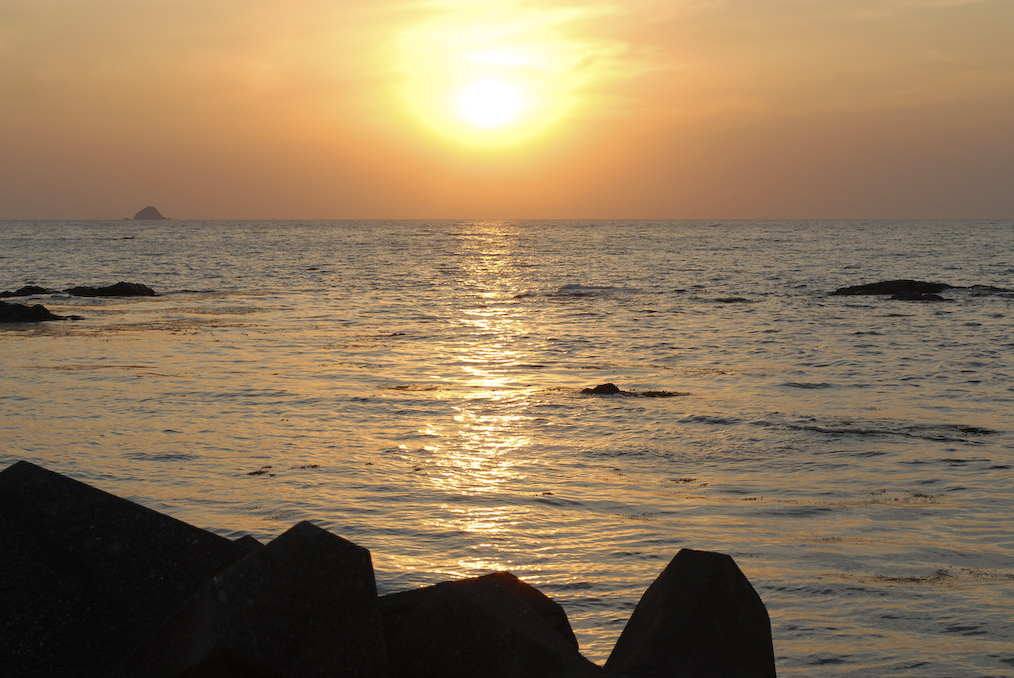
Sanrigahama coast

Masuda (益田市, Masuda-shi) is a city located in Shimane Prefecture, Japan. As of 31 July 2023, the city had an estimated population of 43,885 in 21,249 households and a population density of 60 persons per km^{2}. The total area of the city is 733.19 square kilometres (283.09 sq mi).

== Geography ==
Masuda is located on the western edge of Honshu, facing the Sea of Japan to the north and the Chugoku Mountains to the south and is bordered by Yamaguchi Prefecture to the west and Hiroshima Prefecture to the southwest. The city has the largest geographic area among municipalities in Shimane Prefecture. The urban center is on a narrow floodplain between the Takatsu River and the Masuda River. Parts of the southern region of the city are within the borders of the Nishi-Chugoku Sanchi Quasi-National Park.

== Neighboring municipalities ==
Hiroshima Prefecture

- Akiōta
- Hatsukaichi
- Kitahiroshima

Shimane Prefecture

- Hamada
- Tsuwano
- Yoshika

Yamaguchi Prefecture

- Hagi
- Iwakuni

=== Climate ===
Masuda has a humid subtropical climate (Köppen climate classification Cfa) with very warm summers and cool winters. Precipitation is abundant throughout the year. The average annual temperature in Masuda is 15.9 °C (60.6 °F). The average annual rainfall is 1,570.5 mm (61.83 in) with July as the wettest month. The temperatures are highest on average in August, at around 27.6 °C (81.7 °F), and lowest in January, at around 5.5 °C (41.9 °F). The highest temperature ever recorded in Masuda was 39.3 °C (102.7 °F) on 6 August 2017; the coldest temperature ever recorded was −7.3 °C (18.9 °F) on 26 February 1981.

Climate data for Masuda (1991−2020 normals, extremes 1978−present)
Month	Jan	Feb	Mar	Apr	May	Jun	Jul	Aug	Sep	Oct	Nov	Dec	Year
Record high °C (°F)	20.4 (68.7)	24.1 (75.4)	27.6 (81.7)	31.7 (89.1)	32.4 (90.3)	36.1 (97.0)	37.9 (100.2)	39.3 (102.7)	37.5 (99.5)	33.7 (92.7)	27.8 (82.0)	25.3 (77.5)	39.3 (102.7)
Mean daily maximum °C (°F)	9.3 (48.7)	10.3 (50.5)	13.7 (56.7)	18.8 (65.8)	23.5 (74.3)	26.4 (79.5)	30.7 (87.3)	32.2 (90.0)	27.9 (82.2)	22.8 (73.0)	17.5 (63.5)	11.9 (53.4)	20.4 (68.7)
Daily mean °C (°F)	5.5 (41.9)	6.1 (43.0)	8.9 (48.0)	13.7 (56.7)	18.4 (65.1)	22.1 (71.8)	26.5 (79.7)	27.6 (81.7)	23.3 (73.9)	17.7 (63.9)	12.6 (54.7)	7.8 (46.0)	15.9 (60.5)
Mean daily minimum °C (°F)	1.9 (35.4)	1.9 (35.4)	4.0 (39.2)	8.4 (47.1)	13.3 (55.9)	18.2 (64.8)	23.0 (73.4)	23.8 (74.8)	19.3 (66.7)	13.1 (55.6)	8.2 (46.8)	4.0 (39.2)	11.6 (52.9)
Record low °C (°F)	−5.1 (22.8)	−7.3 (18.9)	−2.5 (27.5)	−1.9 (28.6)	3.4 (38.1)	8.7 (47.7)	13.6 (56.5)	16.3 (61.3)	7.4 (45.3)	2.9 (37.2)	0.2 (32.4)	−2.3 (27.9)	−7.3 (18.9)
Average precipitation mm (inches)	97.0 (3.82)	80.5 (3.17)	121.4 (4.78)	109.8 (4.32)	124.4 (4.90)	179.8 (7.08)	238.2 (9.38)	136.0 (5.35)	169.6 (6.68)	107.6 (4.24)	96.5 (3.80)	109.8 (4.32)	1,570.5 (61.83)
Average precipitation days (≥ 1.0 mm)	13.2	12.2	12.5	10.4	9.4	11.4	10.9	8.8	10.1	8.7	10.3	13.5	131.4
Mean monthly sunshine hours	74.5	99.4	156.3	191.9	213.9	160.9	182.9	215.4	164.2	170.0	121.4	81.2	1,840.6
Source: Japan Meteorological Agency

Climate data for Iwami Airport, Masuda (2003−2020 normals, extremes 2003−present)
Month	Jan	Feb	Mar	Apr	May	Jun	Jul	Aug	Sep	Oct	Nov	Dec	Year
Record high °C (°F)	18.8 (65.8)	23.1 (73.6)	26.8 (80.2)	30.6 (87.1)	30.7 (87.3)	34.9 (94.8)	35.2 (95.4)	37.2 (99.0)	35.9 (96.6)	32.1 (89.8)	27.0 (80.6)	24.1 (75.4)	37.2 (99.0)
Mean daily maximum °C (°F)	8.7 (47.7)	9.9 (49.8)	13.0 (55.4)	17.7 (63.9)	22.1 (71.8)	24.8 (76.6)	29.0 (84.2)	30.4 (86.7)	26.5 (79.7)	21.7 (71.1)	16.9 (62.4)	11.1 (52.0)	19.3 (66.8)
Daily mean °C (°F)	5.0 (41.0)	5.8 (42.4)	8.5 (47.3)	13.0 (55.4)	17.5 (63.5)	21.1 (70.0)	25.3 (77.5)	26.4 (79.5)	22.5 (72.5)	17.2 (63.0)	12.4 (54.3)	7.2 (45.0)	15.2 (59.3)
Mean daily minimum °C (°F)	1.6 (34.9)	1.8 (35.2)	3.9 (39.0)	8.2 (46.8)	13.0 (55.4)	17.9 (64.2)	22.3 (72.1)	23.2 (73.8)	19.0 (66.2)	13.1 (55.6)	8.3 (46.9)	3.7 (38.7)	11.3 (52.4)
Record low °C (°F)	−5.2 (22.6)	−4.4 (24.1)	−2.2 (28.0)	−1.6 (29.1)	4.2 (39.6)	10.2 (50.4)	15.3 (59.5)	15.4 (59.7)	11.1 (52.0)	5.5 (41.9)	0.5 (32.9)	−2.4 (27.7)	−5.2 (22.6)
Average precipitation mm (inches)	79.1 (3.11)	78.3 (3.08)	113.3 (4.46)	113.9 (4.48)	111.0 (4.37)	160.4 (6.31)	252.3 (9.93)	141.0 (5.55)	171.4 (6.75)	114.5 (4.51)	82.9 (3.26)	115.0 (4.53)	1,533 (60.35)
Average precipitation days (≥ 1.0 mm)	11.6	10.6	11.7	10.1	7.9	10.3	11.5	9.1	10.4	8.4	9.4	13.3	124.3
Source: Japan Meteorological Agency

=== Demographics ===
Per Japanese census data, the population of Masuda in 2020 is 45,003 people. Masuda has been conducting censuses since 1920.

Historical population
Year	Pop.	±%
1920	52,185	—
1925	53,767	+3.0%
1930	54,962	+2.2%
1935	57,150	+4.0%
1940	56,877	−0.5%
1945	66,488	+16.9%
1950	68,219	+2.6%
1955	72,991	+7.0%
1960	70,018	−4.1%
1965	63,337	−9.5%
1970	58,308	−7.9%
1975	57,727	−1.0%
1980	59,040	+2.3%
1985	60,080	+1.8%
1990	57,706	−4.0%
1995	56,596	−1.9%
2000	54,622	−3.5%
2005	52,368	−4.1%
2010	49,925	−4.7%
2015	47,718	−4.4%
2020	45,003	−5.7%
Masuda population statistics

== History ==
The area of Masuda was part of ancient Iwami Province, and corresponds almost exactly with Mino District, which is mentioned from the Nara period onwards. The area was controlled by the Masuda clan from the Kamakura period to the end of the Sengoku period. During the Edo Period, the area was divided between the holdings of Tsuwano Domain and Hamada Domain. After the Meiji restoration, the town of Masuda was established on April 1, 1889 with the creation of the modern municipalities system. The city was founded on August 1, 1952 by the merger of Masuda with seven neighbouring villages. On November 1, 2004, the towns of Mito and Hikimi (both from Mino District) were merged into Masuda. Mino District was dissolved as a result of this merger.

== Government ==
Masuda has a mayor-council form of government with a directly elected mayor and a unicameral city council of 22 members. Masuda contributes three members to the Shimane Prefectural Assembly. In terms of national politics, the city is part of the Shimane 2nd district of the lower house of the Diet of Japan.

== Economy ==
The main industries in Masuda are agriculture and commercial fishing. Manufacturing includes textiles and electronic components.

== Education ==
Masuda has 15 public elementary school and ten public junior high schools operated by the city government, and two public high schools operated by the Shimane Prefectural Board of Education. There are also two private high schools, and the prefecture operates one special education school for the handicapped.

== Transportation ==
=== Airport ===
- Iwami Airport

=== Railway ===
JR West (JR West) - San'in Main Line

- Kamate - Iwami-Tsuda - Masuda - Todakohama - Iinoura

JR West (JR West) - Yamaguchi Line

- Iwami-Yokota - Honmataga - Masuda

=== Highways ===
- National Route 9
- National Route 187
- National Route 191
- National Route 488

== Sister cities ==
- Ningbo, China, since October 1990
- Queenstown, New Zealand

== Local attractions ==
- Ikō-ji, National Historic Site and National Place of Scenic Beauty
- Iwami Art Museum
- Manpuku-ji, National Historic Site and National Place of Scenic Beauty
- Nakazu-Higashihara Site, National Historic Site
- Nanao Castle ruins, National Historic Site
- Ōmoto Kofun, National Historic Site
- Sesshū Memorial Museum
- Shimane Prefectural Manyō Park
- Sukumozuka Kofun, National Historic Site

== Notable people from Masuda ==
- Kaoru Iwamoto was a Japanese professional go player.
- Saki Kashima is a Japanese professional wrestler.
- Manami Toyota is a Japanese retired professional wrestler.
