= Masuda clan =

Family crest of the Masuda clan

The Masuda clan was a Japanese clan in the Iwami Province (present-day Shimane Prefecture), Japan, from the 13th century until 1600.

== History ==
=== Origins ===
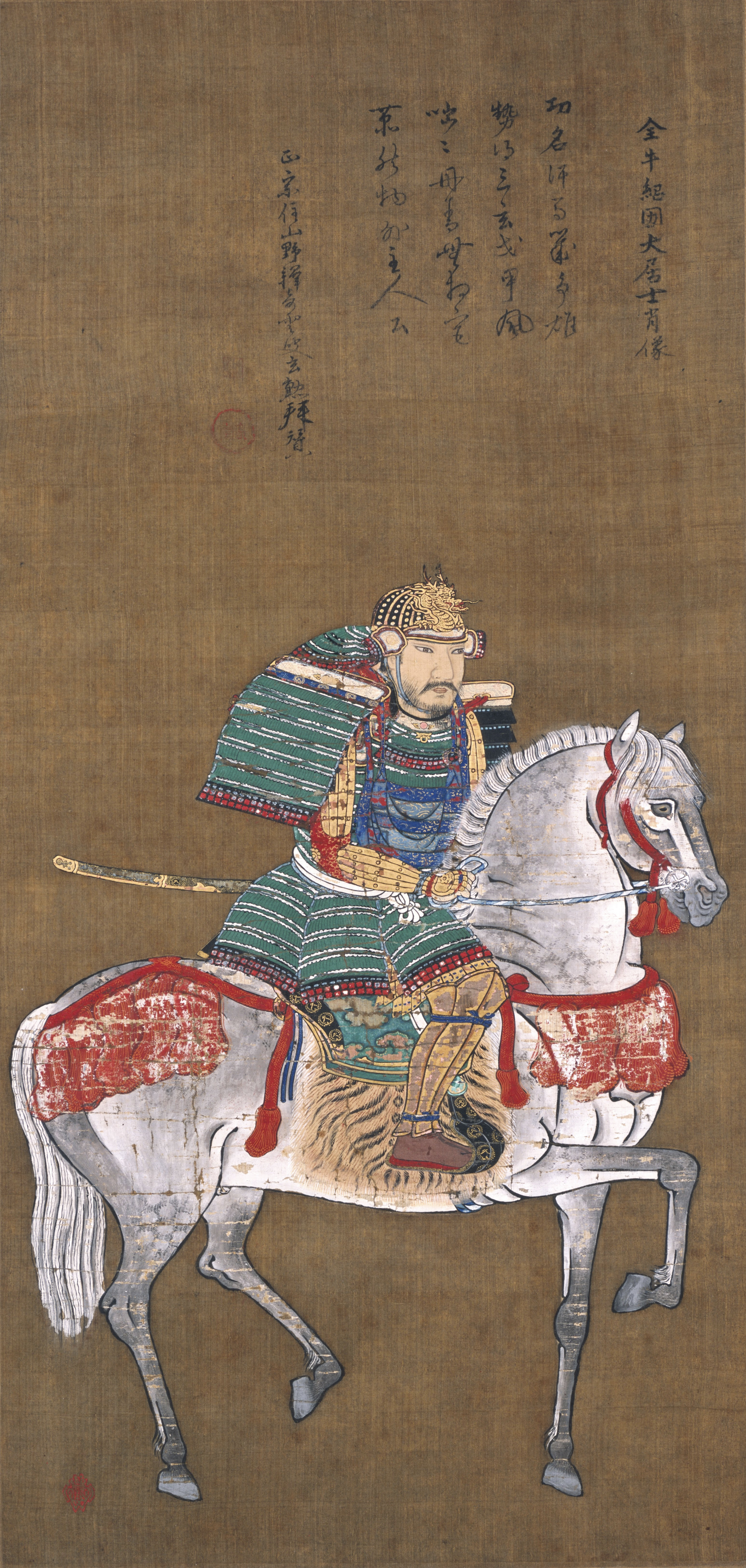
Masuda Motoyoshi

Fujiwara Kunikane started his new post as Iwami provincial governor in the 11th century, the end of the Heian period. At that time, the Iwami government was in the city of Hamada.

==== Move to Masuda and name change ====
However, the fourth Lord Masuda, Kanetaka (兼高) moved their base to the Masuda, a strategic point for the traffic and a suitable place for a port. He also changed his family name from Fujiwara to Masuda, the name of this area. Kanetaka Masuda decided to belong to the new power Genji. He became a commander of the Genji military and fought against the Heike.

==== Kamakura period ====
His army belonged to Minamoto no Yoshitsune and served in the Battle of Ichi-no-Tani (1184) and the Battle of Dan-no-ura (1185), in which Heike was annihilated. Meanwhile, Kanetaka Masuda saved power steadily and ruled about a one-third of Iwami in the early days of the Kamakura period.

==== Sengoku era ====
The 11th Lord Masuda, Kaneharu (兼晴), was allied with the powerful Ōuchi clan in Yamaguchi. The 15th Lord Masuda, Kanetsu (兼堯), was involved in many battles, including the Ōnin War (1467). However, he was also involved with culture. He invited the artist Sesshū Tōyō to Masuda, and it is said that Sesshū drew his "Portrait of Kanetsu (益田兼堯像)" out of gratitude for Kanetsu's hospitality.

In those days, there were many small battles between clans, and warriors were not separated. Everybody was armored and protected their land. Masuda was opposed to neighboring powers, such as the Mori clan, the Yoshimi clan, and the Amago clan. Meanwhile, the Mori family was becoming more powerful and the Ouchi clan less so. The Masuda clan allied itself with the Mori clan.

The 19th lord of Masuda, Fujikane (藤兼), made peace with the Mori clan. It is left in the Masuda’s document that he gave various kinds of gift to the Mori clan. It was written in the Korean book that Masuda had trade with other countries.

The Masuda clan got an important post from Mōri Motonari, and the 20th lord of Masuda, Motoyoshi (元祥), was given a character "Moto" (元), from Motonari (元就), to his name.

Motoyoshi widened his territory from Nagato Province in present-day Yamaguchi Prefecture to Izumo Province in present-day Shimane Prefecture, and a part of Kyūshū.

At the Battle of Sekigahara (1600), the Mori and Masuda clans belonged to the Toyotomi group, but he did not send his army to the battle.

==== Edo era ====
Although he was allowed to keep his territory by Tokugawa Ieyasu, the Shogun of Edo period, he chose to follow the Mori clan and left Masuda, as the Mori clan was bottled up into a small area, Susa in Nagato.

Masuda city had been a Nanao castle town for 400 years under Masuda administration.
