= Iwami Airport =

Iwami Airport 石見空港
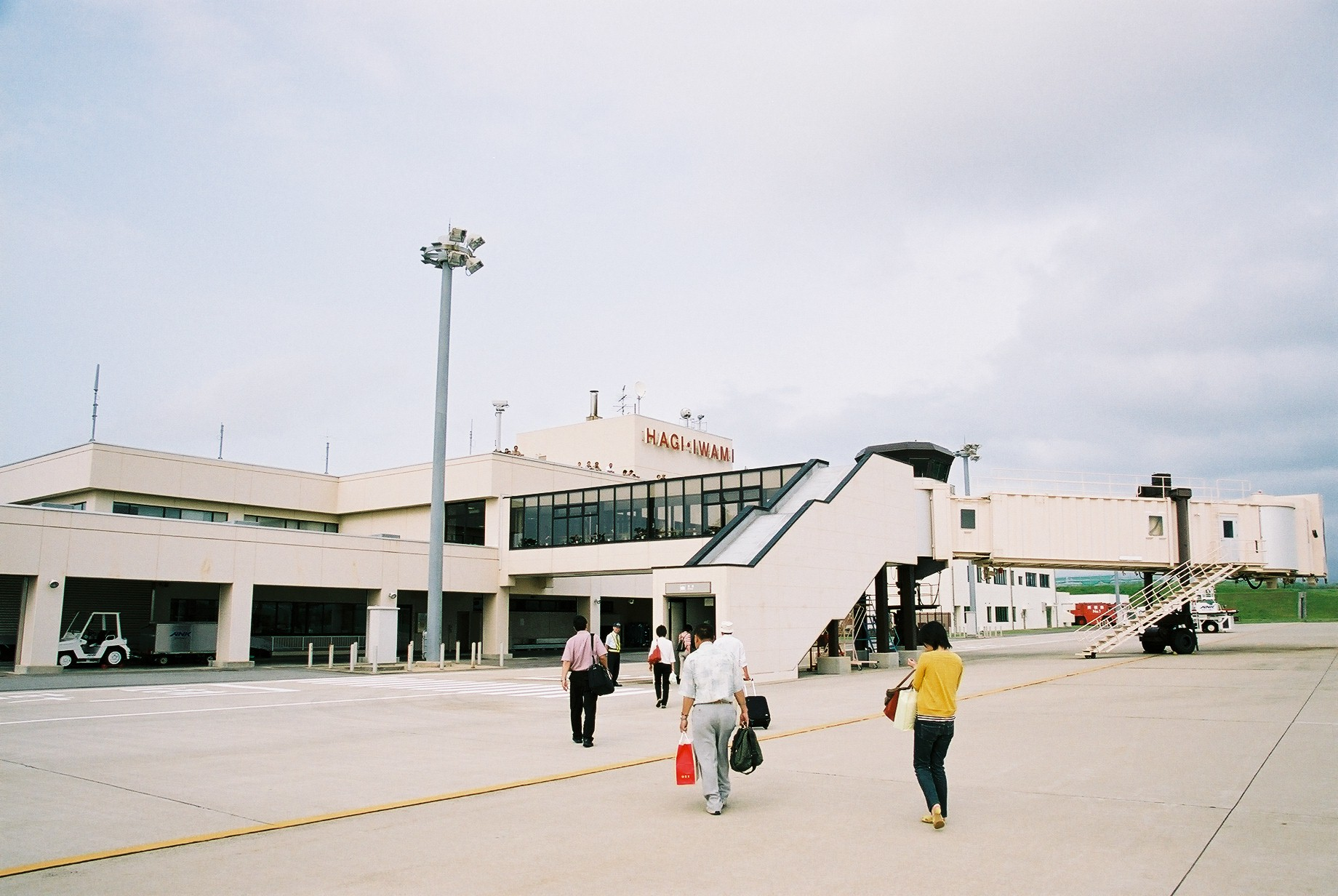
- IATA: IWJ; ICAO: RJOW

Summary
- Airport type: Public
- Operator: Government
- Location: Masuda, Shimane, Japan
- Elevation AMSL: 177 ft / 54 m
- Coordinates: 34°40′35″N 131°47′25″E

Map
- Location in Japan RJOW (Japan)

Runways
Direction	Length		Surface
Direction	m	ft	Surface
11/29	2,000	6,562	Asphalt concrete

Statistics (2015)
- Passengers: 129,632
- Cargo (metric tonnes): 0
- Aircraft movement: 1,830
- Source: Japanese Ministry of Land, Infrastructure, Transport and Tourism

Iwami Airport (石見空港, Iwami Kūkō) (IATA: IWJ, ICAO: RJOW) is an airport located 2.8 NM (5.2 km; 3.2 mi) Masuda, Shimane Prefecture, Japan. It is also known as Hagi-Iwami Airport due to its proximity to the city of Hagi in Yamaguchi Prefecture. It is a 2 or 3 hour drive from the old town of Iwami, its primary namesake.

== Operation ==
There are two daily round trip flights from Tokyo. During late summer another daily round trip flight from Osaka is available for about a month.

In late Summer the annual Inaka Ride cycling event course includes riding on the runway.

In late Autumn the annual Hagi-Iwami Airport Marathon starts near the airport gateway and the starting course includes running on the runway.

For both events the daily scheduled flights are not interrupted.

== History ==
Iwami Airport opened in July 1993 with service to Tokyo Haneda and Osaka Itami. These services experienced weak passenger demand in the airport's first years of operation, despite local subsidies and reduced landing fees intended to make them more competitive. The Iwami-Haneda route boarded a record number of passengers in 2013 after Marine Corps Air Station Iwakuni opened for passenger flights, as this made it possible to create tour packages to Izumo-taisha, Itsukushima Shrine and other regional attractions using both airports as gateways. Iwami's IATA airport code of IWJ was originally used by Iwakuni when it hosted international flights between 1952 and 1964.

== Airlines and destinations ==
Airlines	Destinations
All Nippon Airways	Tokyo–Haneda; Seasonal: Osaka–Itami
