= Toyama Airport =

Airport in Toyama Prefecture, Japan

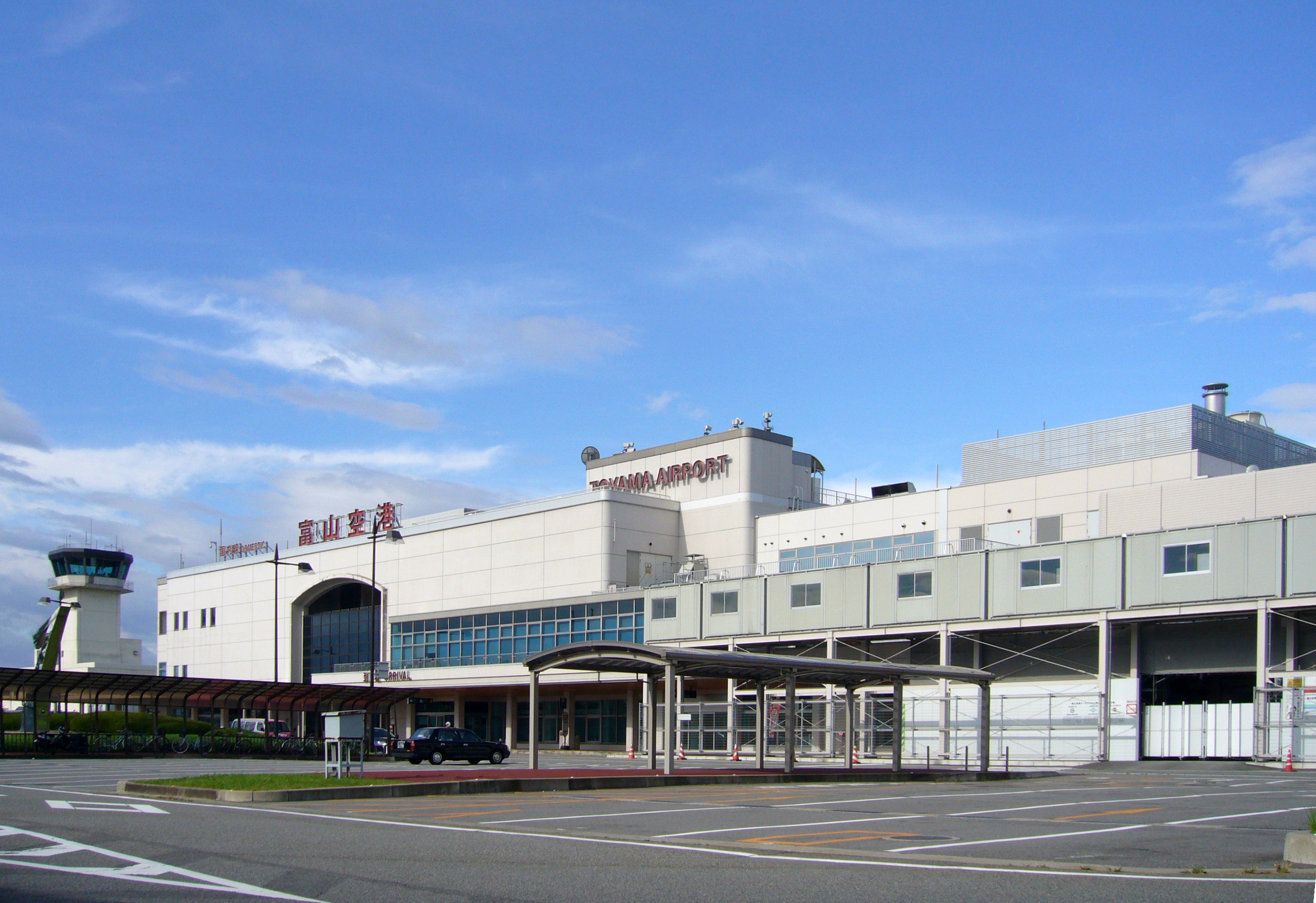
- IATA: TOY; ICAO: RJNT

Summary
- Airport type: Public
- Operator: Toyama Prefecture
- Location: Toyama, Toyama Prefecture, Japan
- Opened: August 20, 1963; 63 years ago
- Elevation AMSL: 127 ft (39 m)
- Coordinates: 36°38′54″N 137°11′15″E
- Website: www.toyama-airport.jp

Map
- Location in Japan TOY/RJNT (Japan)

Runways
Direction	Length		Surface
Direction	m	ft	Surface
02/20	2,000	6,562	Asphalt/Concrete

Statistics (2015)
- Passengers: 736,740
- Cargo (metric tonnes): 1,450
- Aircraft movements: 9,262
- Source: Japanese Ministry of Land, Infrastructure, Transport and Tourism

Toyama Airport (富山空港, Toyama Kūkō) (IATA: TOY, ICAO: RJNT) is an airport located in the city of Toyama, Toyama Prefecture, Japan. It services are primarily domestic flights and international flights to China and Taiwan; seasonal international charter flights also service Toyama from April to June. The airport has been nicknamed Toyama-Takayama Sushi Airport (富山高山すし空港, Toyama Takayama Sushi Kūkō) since July 2026.

Located approximately 7 km (4.3 mi) south of central Toyama, the airport is part of the Tateyama Kurobe Alpine Route and is the closest international airport to UNESCO World Heritage Site of Gokayama. As the airport has convenient access to downtown Toyama and various highways, the airport also serves a wide area of the Jōetsu region of Niigata Prefecture and Hida region of Gifu Prefecture.

The airport opened on August 20, 1963, with regularly scheduled flights by All Nippon Airways to Tokyo Haneda Airport using a Fokker F-27. This was replaced by a NAMC YS-11 in 1970. In 1984, the runway was lengthened from 1200 to 2000 meters to accommodate jet operations and a new terminal building was completed. An international terminal was completed in March 1993, Asiana and Aeroflot becoming the first international airlines to schedule service to the airport from Seoul and Vladivostok respectively. In late 1990s, Aeroflot terminated the link to Vladivostok, while Asiana retained it.

It is the only airport built on a riverbed in Japan, and the runways and aprons are located on the riverbed on the right bank of the Jinzū River. The terminal building is outside the river, and the boarding bridge built across the levee is Japan's longest. Because of the location of the riverbed, it was not possible to completely install the instrument landing system, which restricts operations in poor visibility due to heavy snow in winter. In addition, physical restrictions are severe, as there is little space on the site and taxiways can not be made to both ends of the runway (there is no parallel taxiway, and planes must made takes a U-turn on a turning pad at the end of the runway for takeoff. The number of departure and arrival flights is limited to 15 per day according to the local agreement. Although plans to relocate the airport, possibly to an offshore location, were discussed, traffic to the airport has decreased dramatically with the opening of the Hokuriku Shinkansen in March 2015.

== Airlines and destinations ==
Airlines	Destinations
All Nippon Airways	Tokyo–Haneda
ANA Wings	Sapporo–Chitose
China Airlines	Seasonal: Taipei–Taoyuan
Trinity Airways	Seasonal: Seoul–Incheon
