= Shimane Prefecture =

Prefecture of Japan

Coordinates: 35°13′N 132°40′E

Shimane Prefecture 島根県
- Prefecture

Japanese transcription(s)
  - Japanese: 島根県
  - Rōmaji: Shimane-ken
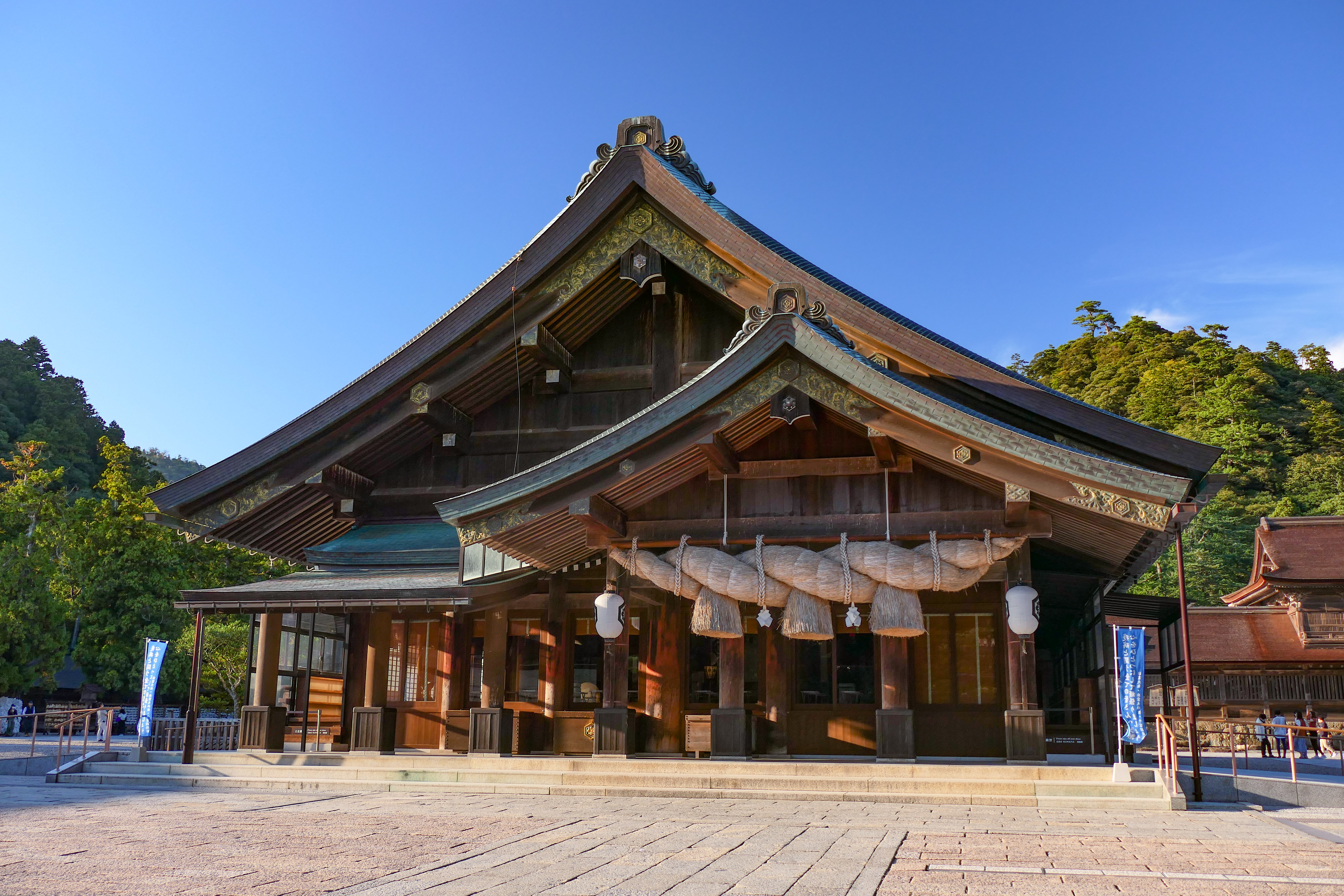
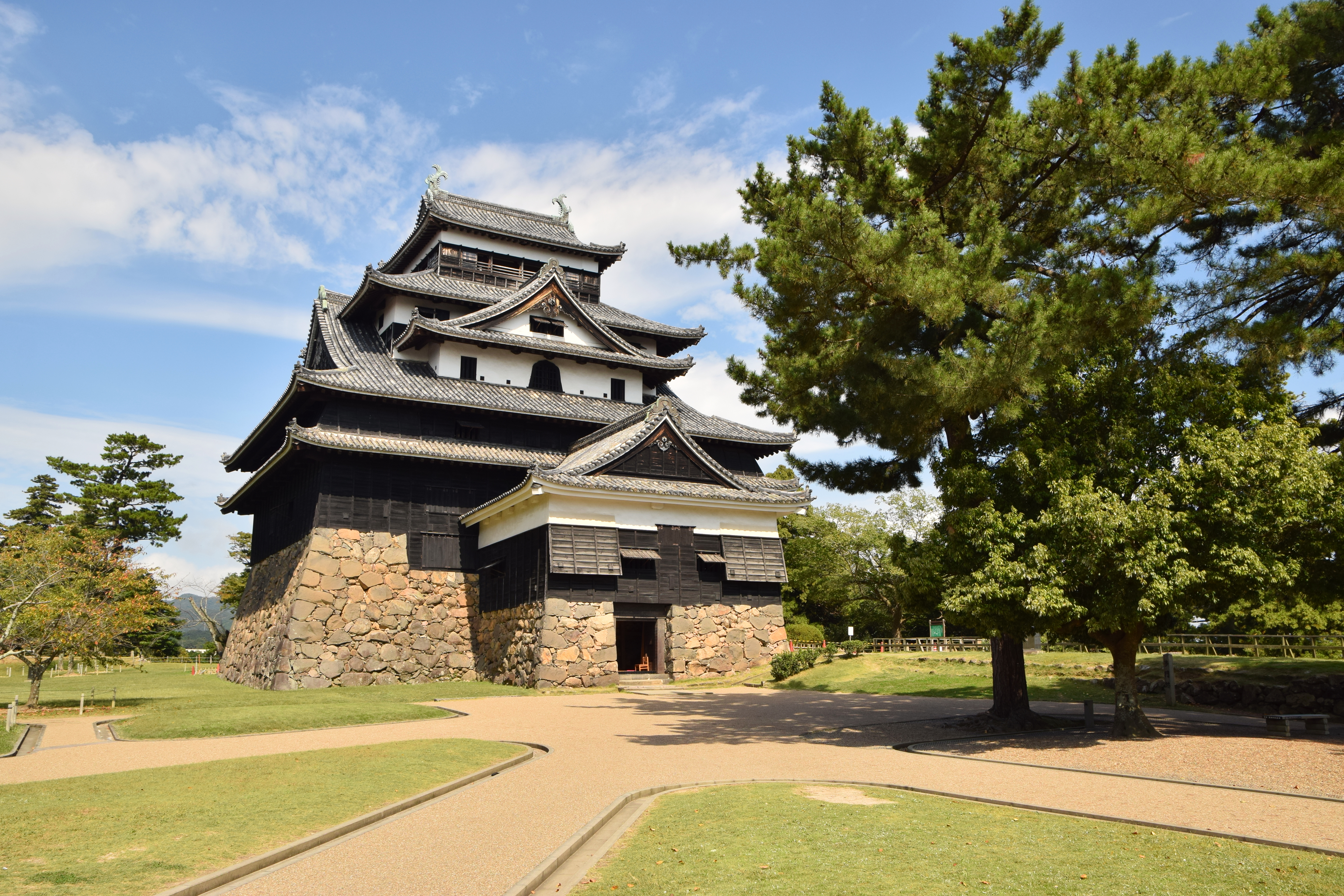
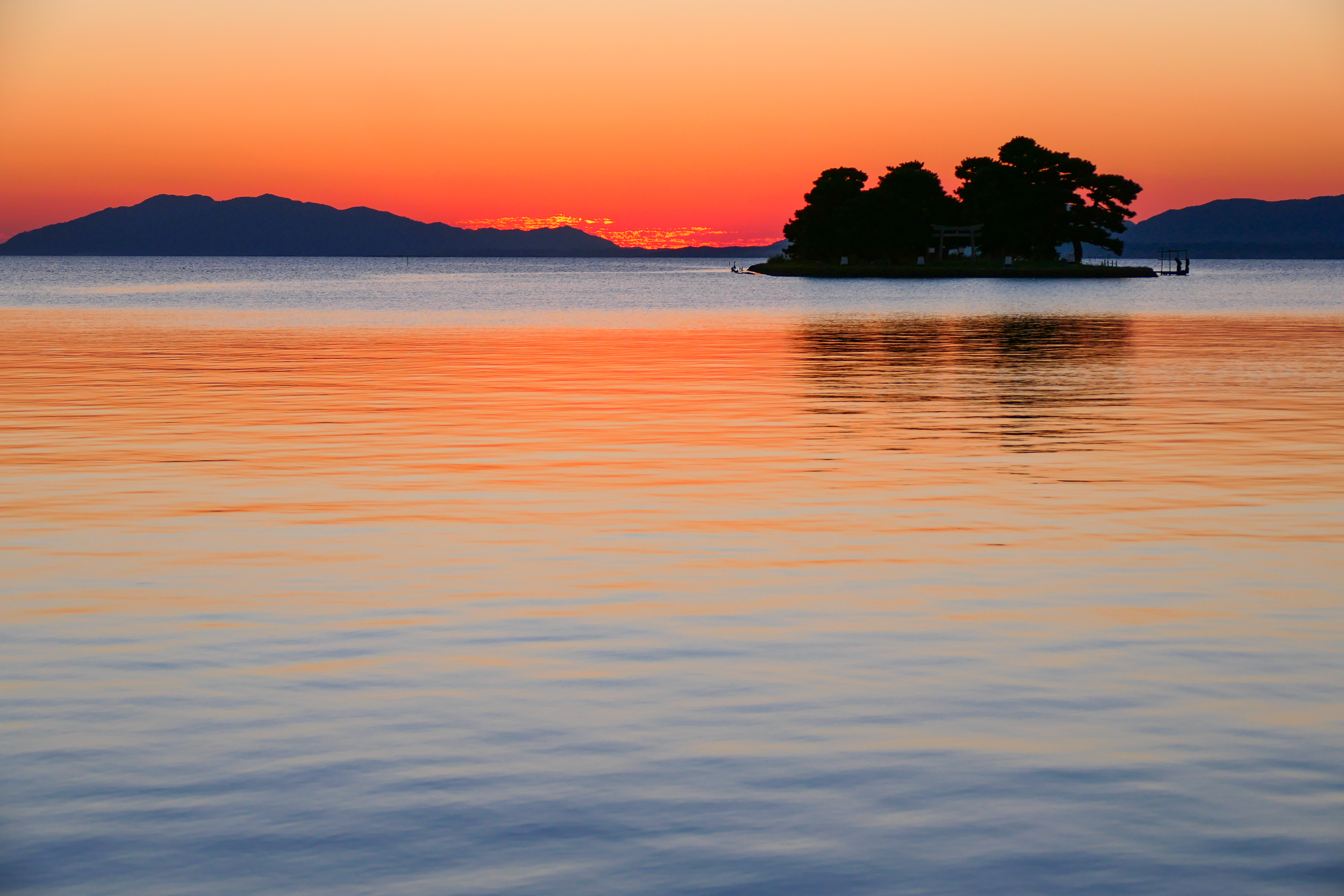
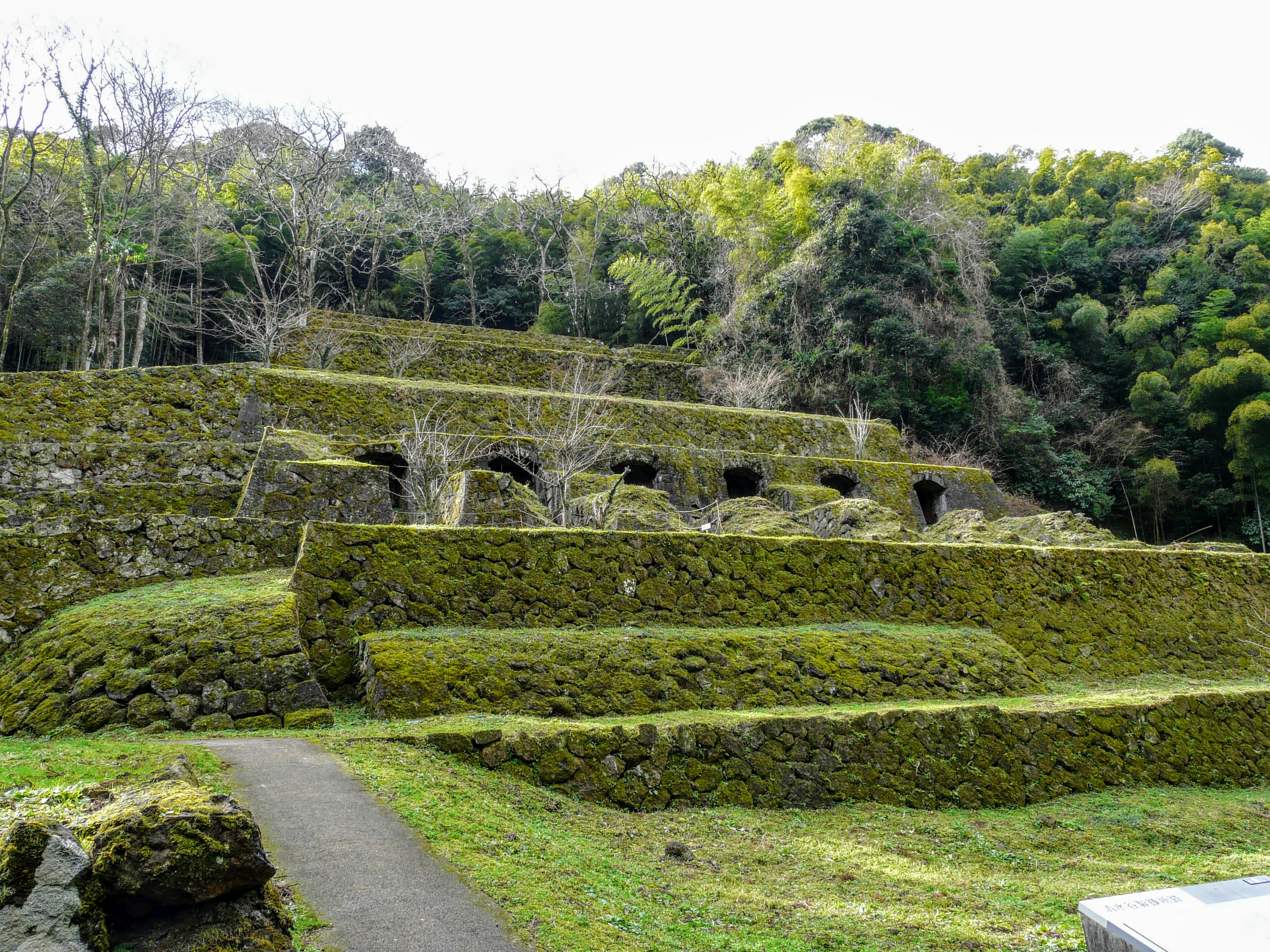
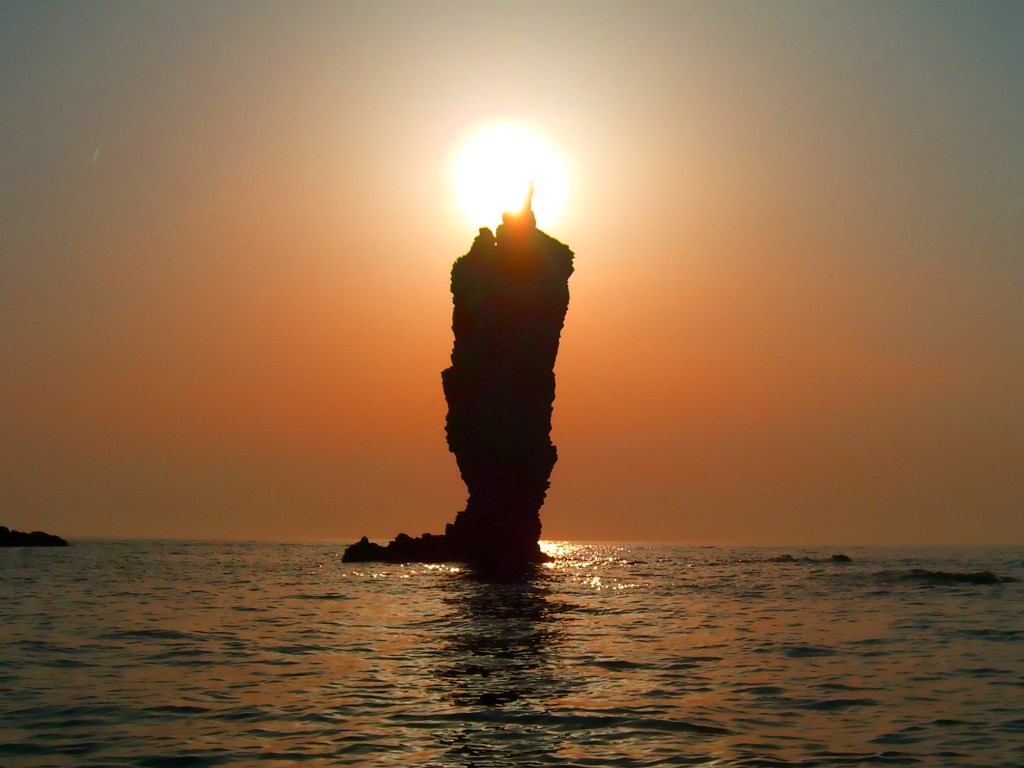
- Izumo Taisha Matsue Castle Lake Shinji Iwami Silver Mine (WHS) Okinoshima

- Flag Symbol
- Anthem: Usu-murasaki no yamanami
- Country: Japan
- Region: Chūgoku (San'in)
- Island: Honshu
- Capital: Matsue
- Subdivisions: Districts: 5, Municipalities: 19

Government
  - Governor: Tatsuya Maruyama

Area
  - Total: 6,708.26 km^{2} (2,590.07 sq mi)
  - Rank: 19th

Population (February 1, 2025)
  - Total: 638,499
  - Rank: 46th
  - Density: 95.2/km^{2} (247/sq mi)

GDP
  - Total: JP¥ 2,753 billion US$ 20.3 billion (2022)
- ISO 3166 code: JP-32
- Website: www1.pref.shimane.lg.jp/contents/kokusai/kokusai-e/index.html
- Symbols of Japan
- Bird: Whooper swan (Cygnus cygnus)
- Fish: Flying Fish
- Flower: Moutan peony (Paeonia suffruticosa)
- Tree: Japanese black pine (Pinus thunbergii)

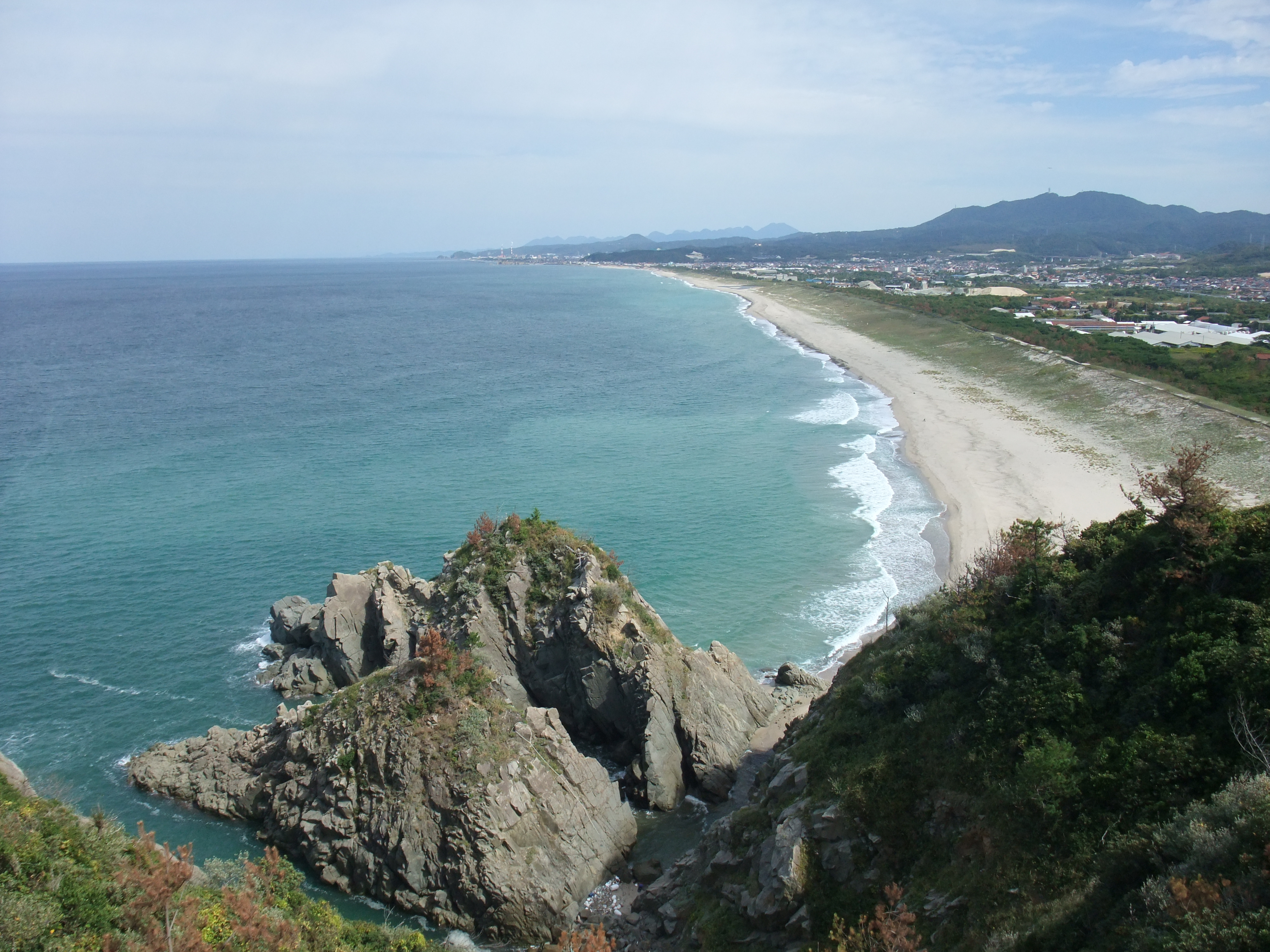
The coast of Gōtsu City, Shimane Prefecture seen from the Osakihana lighthouse

Shimane Prefecture (島根県, Shimane-ken; Japanese pronunciation: [ɕí.mä̀.nè̞, ɕì.mä́.né̞.kè̞ɴ̀]) is a prefecture of Japan located in the Chūgoku region of Honshu. Shimane Prefecture is the second-least populous prefecture of Japan at 621,974 (september 1, 2026) and has a geographic area of 6,708.26 km^{2}. Shimane Prefecture borders Yamaguchi Prefecture to the southwest, Hiroshima Prefecture to the south, and Tottori Prefecture to the east.

Matsue is the capital and largest city of Shimane Prefecture, with other major cities including Izumo, Hamada, and Masuda. Shimane Prefecture contains the majority of the Lake Shinji-Nakaumi metropolitan area centered on Matsue, and with a population of approximately 600,000 is Japan's third-largest metropolitan area on the Sea of Japan coast after Niigata and Greater Kanazawa. Shimane Prefecture is bounded by the Sea of Japan coastline on the north, where two-thirds of the population live, and the Chūgoku Mountains on the south. Shimane Prefecture governs the Oki Islands in the Sea of Japan which juridically includes the disputed Liancourt Rocks (竹島, Takeshima). Shimane Prefecture is home to Izumo-taisha, one of the oldest Shinto shrines in Japan, and the Tokugawa-era Matsue Castle.

== History ==
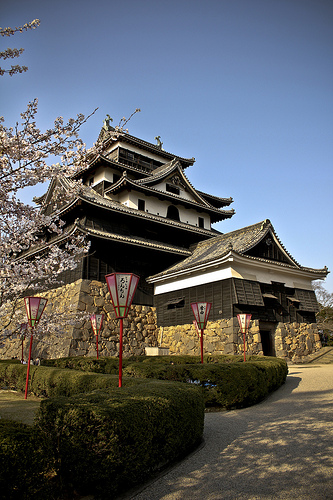
Matsue Castle

=== Early history ===
The history of Shimane starts with Japanese mythology. The Shinto god Ōkuninushi was believed to live in Izumo, an old province in Shimane. Izumo Shrine, which is in the city of Izumo, honors the god. At that time, the current Shimane prefecture was divided into three parts: Iwami, Izumo, and Oki. That lasted until the abolition of the han system took place in 1871. During the Nara period, Kakinomoto no Hitomaro wrote a poem on Shimane's nature when he was sent as the Royal governor.

Later on in the Kamakura period (1185–1333), the Kamakura shogunate forced emperors Go-Toba and Godaigo into exile in Oki. Emperor Go-Daigo later escaped from Oki and began rallying supporters against the shogunate, which proved successful.

=== Middle ages ===
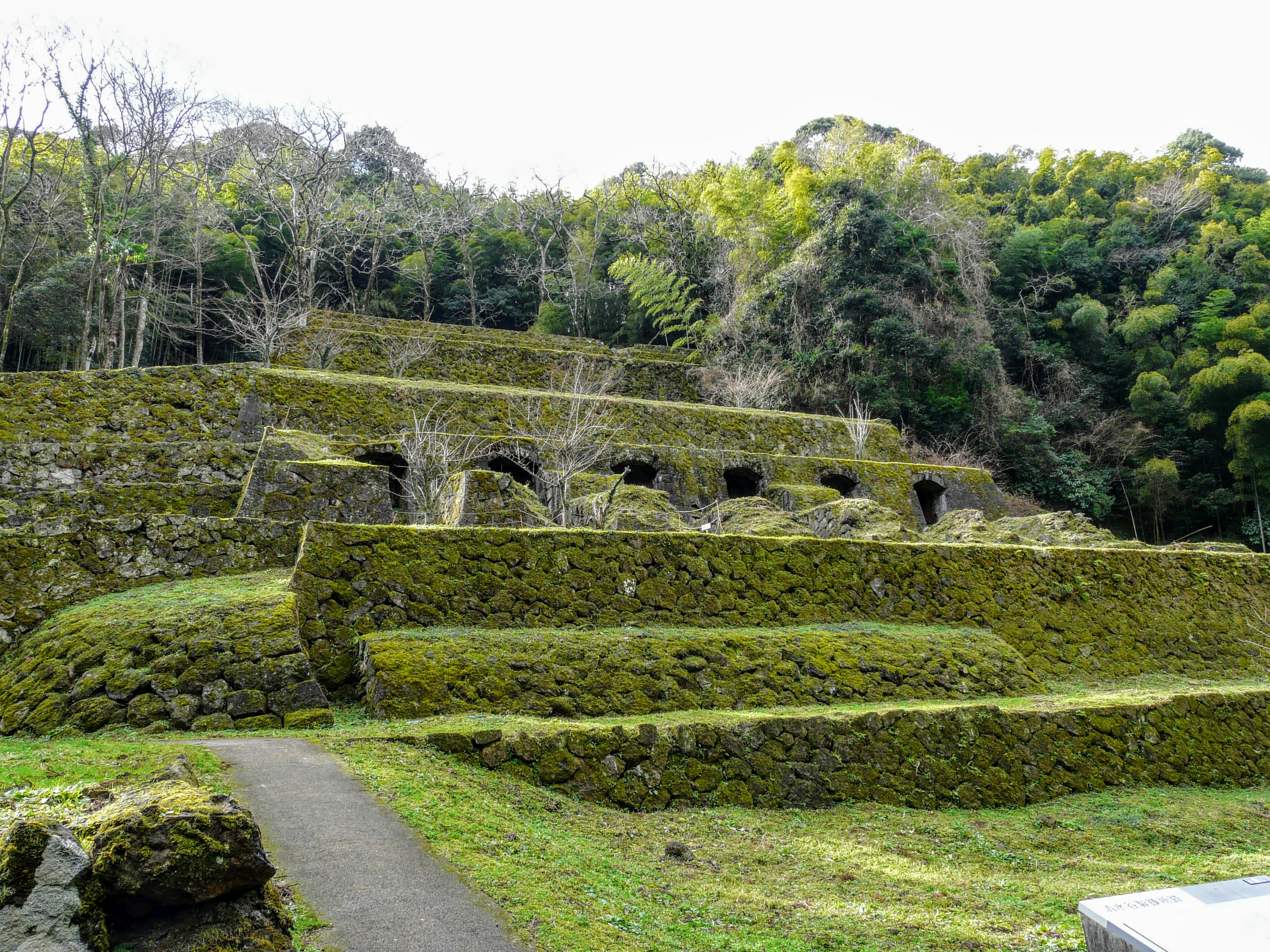
A view of Shimizudani silver mine refinery ruin, a part of UNESCO World Heritage area

During the Muromachi period (1336–1573), Izumo and Oki were controlled by the Kyōgoku clan. However, after the Ōnin War, the Amago clan expanded power based in Gassantoda Castle and the Masuda clan dominated Iwami Province. The Iwami Ginzan Silver Mine was located between Amago territory and Masuda territory, and there were many battles between the clans for the silver. In 1566 Mōri Motonari conquered Izumo, Iwami, and Oki. In 1600, after over 30 years of Mori control, Horio Yoshiharu entered Izumo and Oki as the result of Battle of Sekigahara, which Mori lost. Following the change, Horio Yoshiharu decided to move to build Matsue Castle instead of Gassan-Toda, and soon after Yoshiharu's death the castle was completed. In 1638, the grandson of Tokugawa Ieyasu Matsudaira Naomasa became the ruler because the Horio clan had no heir, and his family ruled until the abolition of the han system.

The Iwami area was split into three regions: the mining district, under the direct control of the Shogunate, the Hamada clan region, and the Tsuwano clan region. The Iwami Ginzan, now a UNESCO World Heritage Site, produced silver and was one of the nation's largest silver mines by the early 17th century. The Hamada clan was on the shogunate's side in the Meiji Restoration, and the castle was burned down. The Tsuwano clan, despite then being ruled by the Matsudaira, was on the emperor's side in the restoration.

=== Modern age ===
In 1871, the abolition of the han system placed the old Shimane and Hamada Provinces in the current area of Shimane Prefecture. Later that year, Oki became part of Tottori. In 1876, Hamada Prefecture was merged into Shimane Prefecture. Also, Tottori Prefecture was added in the same year. However, five years later, in 1881, the current portion of Tottori Prefecture was separated and the current border was formed.

== Geography ==
Shimane Prefecture is situated on the Sea of Japan side of the Chūgoku region. Because of its mountainous landscape, rice farming is done mostly in the Izumo plain where the city of Izumo is located. Another major landform is the Shimane peninsula. The peninsula is located across the Sea of Japan from Izumo to Sakaiminato, which is located in Tottori prefecture. Also, the peninsula created two brackish lakes, Lake Shinji and Nakaumi. The island of Daikon is located in Nakaumi. Off the main island of Honshū, the island of Oki belongs to Shimane prefecture as well. The island itself is in the Daisen-Oki National Park. Shimane also claims the use of Liancourt Rocks, over which they are in dispute with South Korea.

As of 1 April 2012, 6% of the total land area of the prefecture was designated as Natural Parks, namely Daisen-Oki National Park; Hiba-Dōgo-Taishaku and Nishi-Chūgoku Sanchi Quasi-National Parks; and eleven Prefectural Natural Parks.

Most major cities are located either on the seaside, or along a river.

=== Cities ===
Map of Shimane Prefecture City Town Village

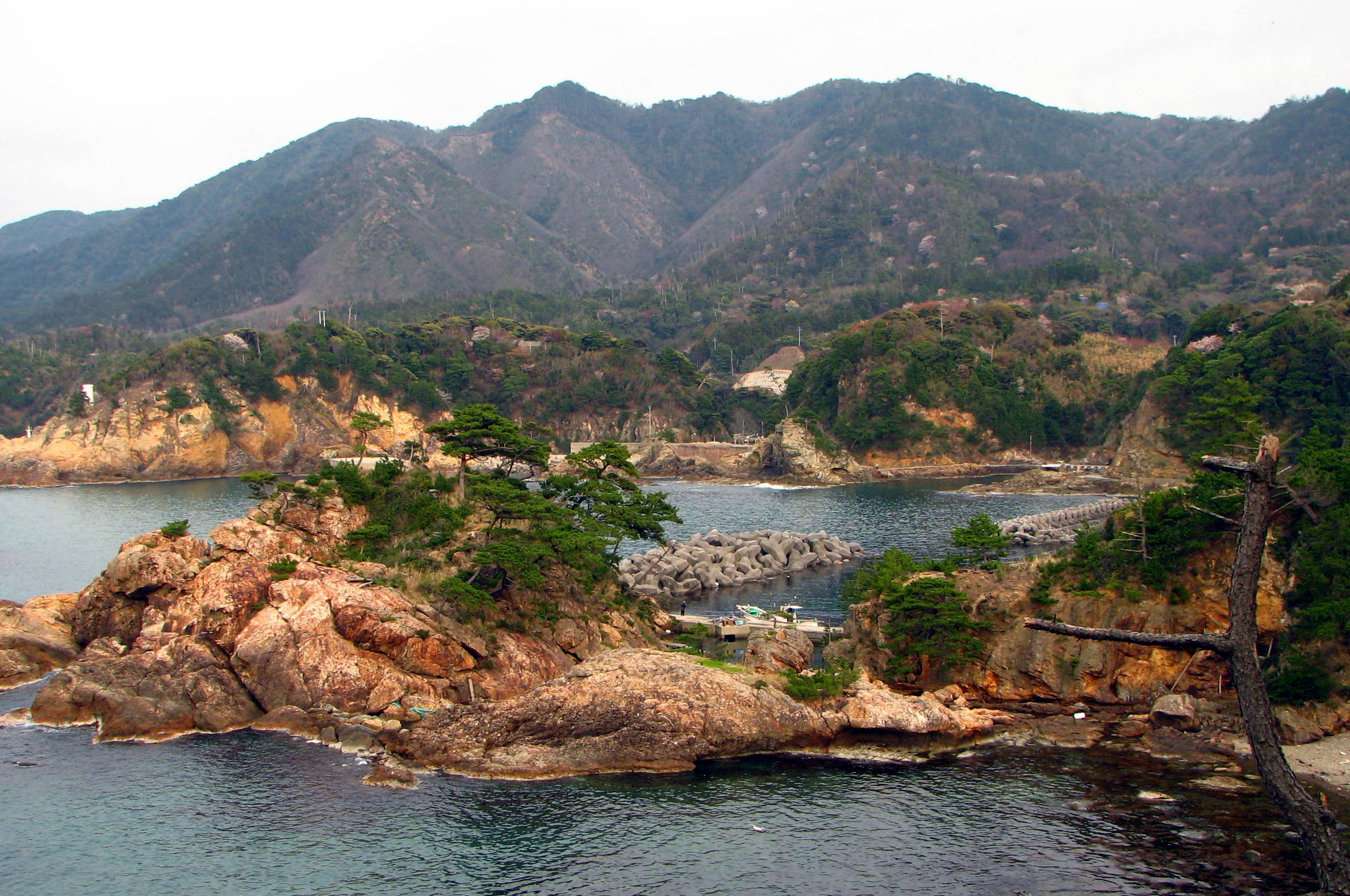
Cape Hinomisaki near Izumo

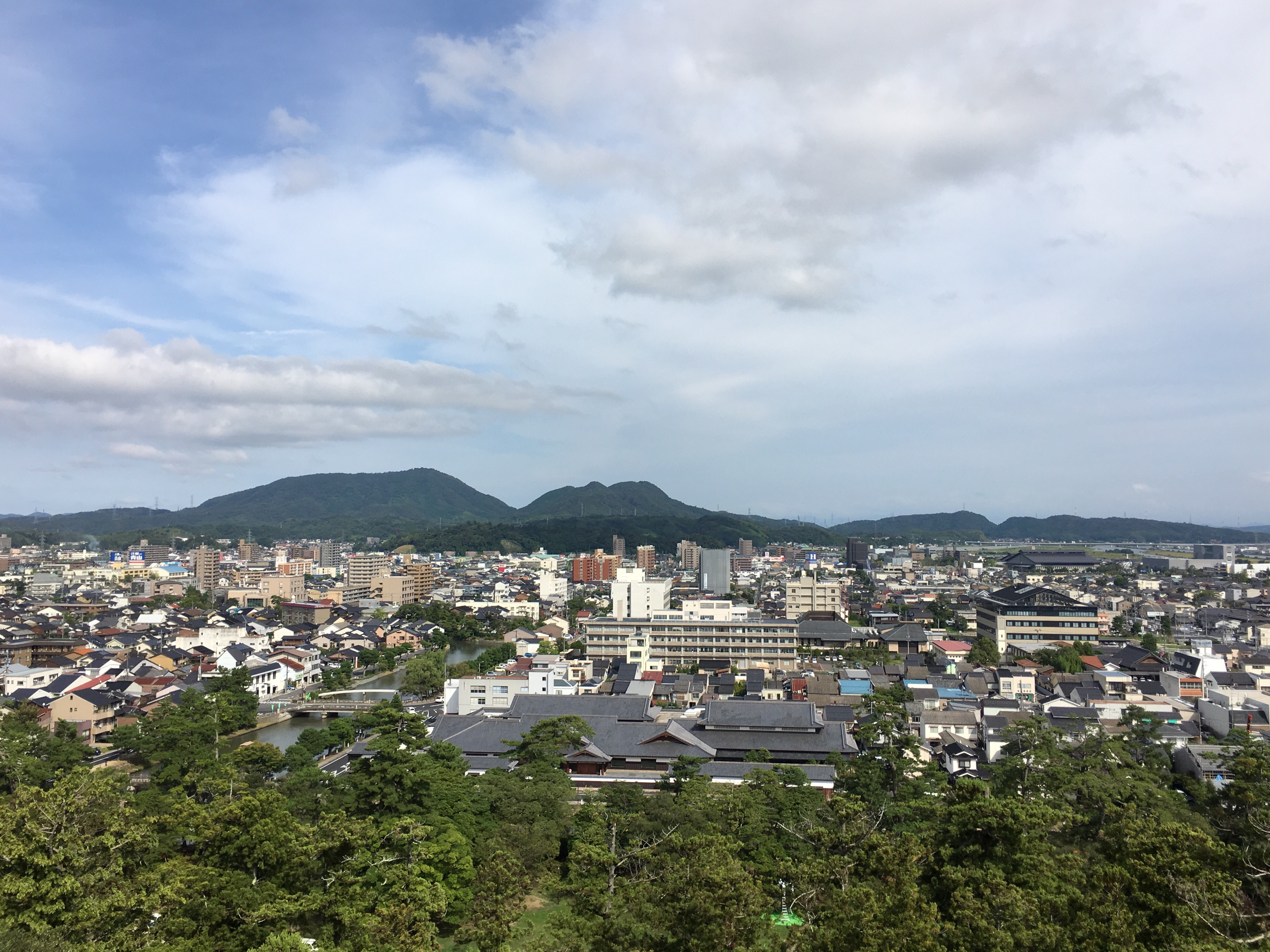
Matsue

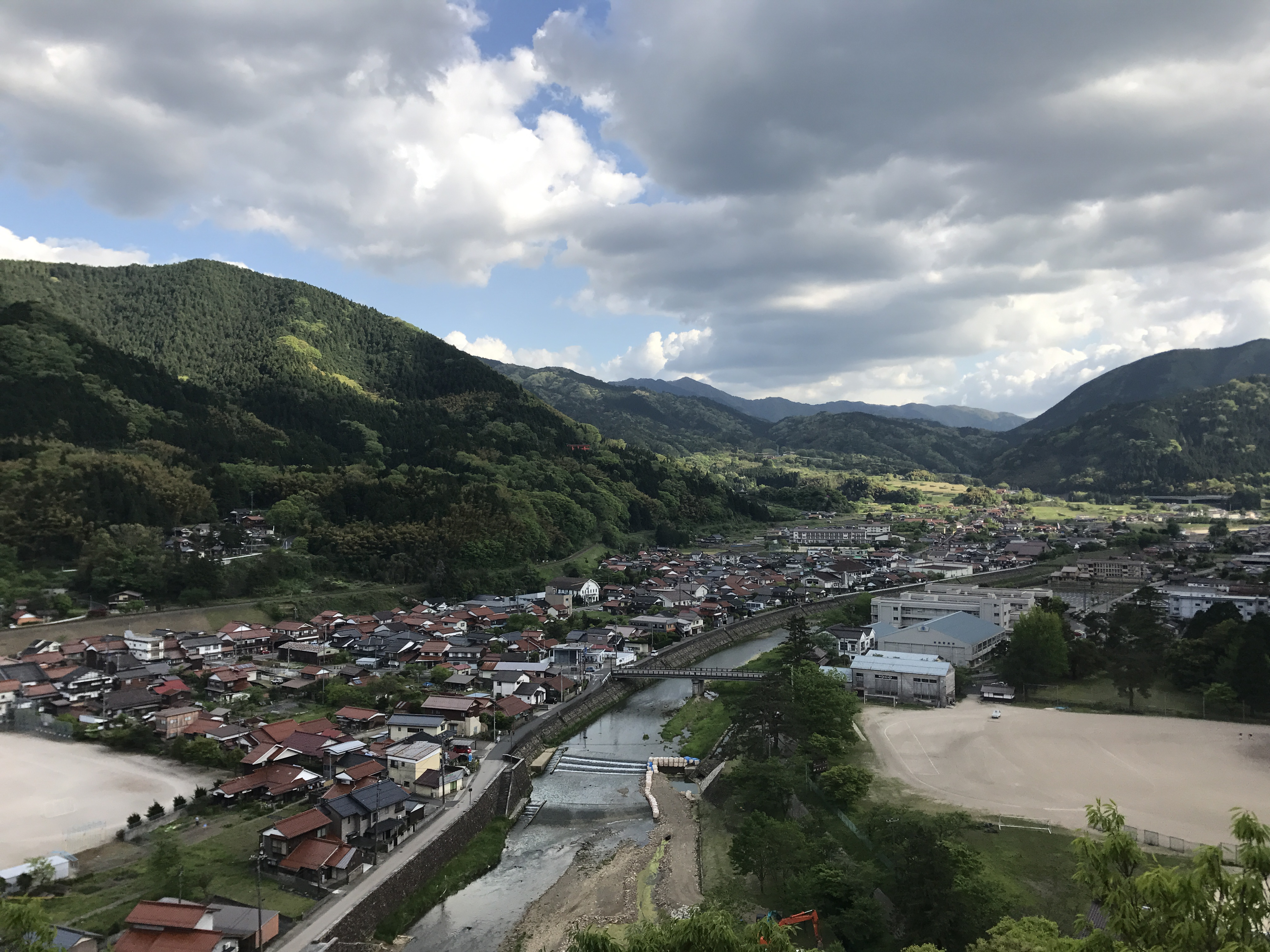
Tsuwano

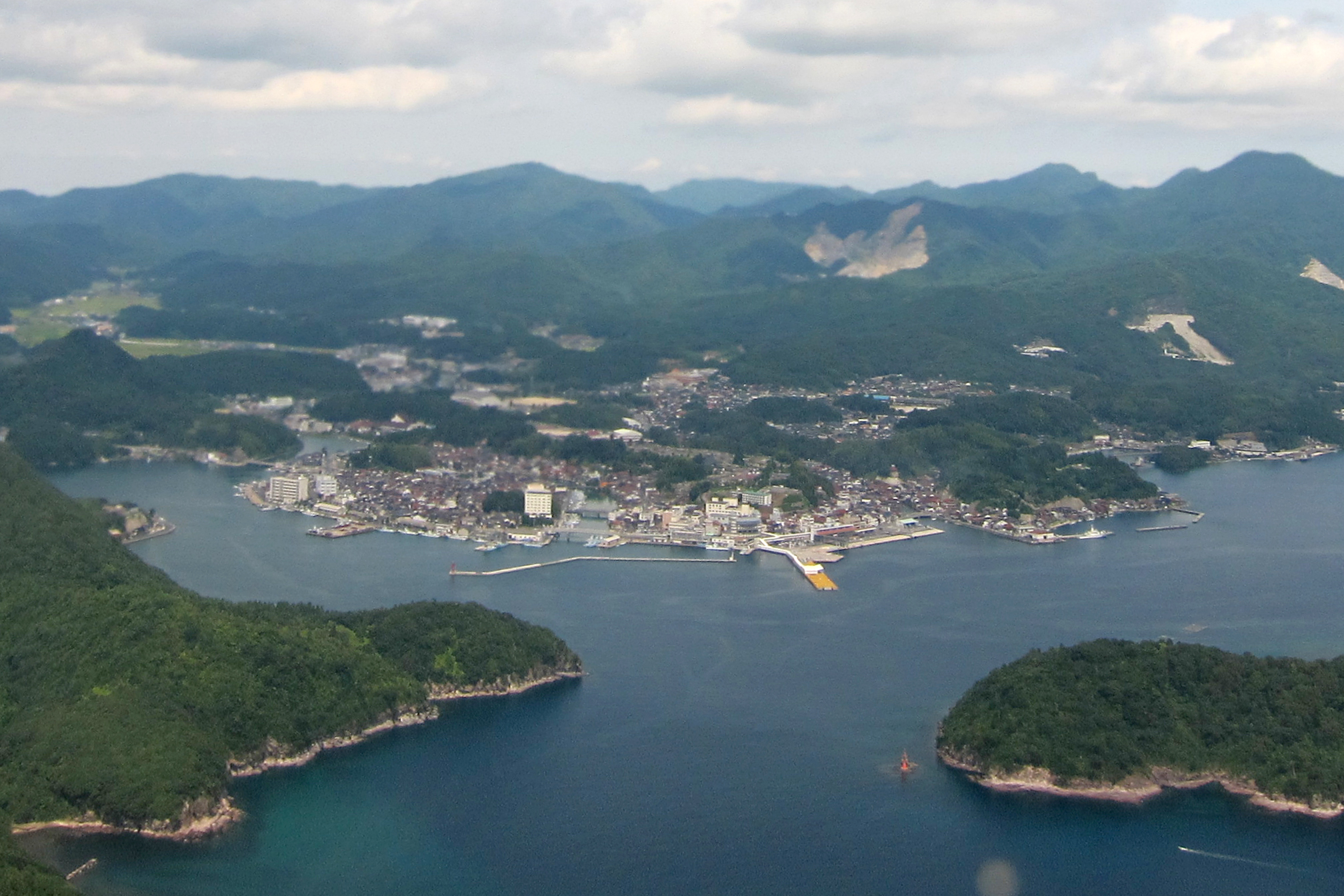
Saigo area of Oki Island

Eight cities are located in Shimane Prefecture, the largest in population being Matsue, the capital, and the smallest being Gōtsu. The cities Masuda, Unnan, Yasugi, and Gōtsu had a slight population increase due to the mergers in the early 2000s.

Name		Area (km^{2})	Population	Map
Rōmaji	Kanji	Area (km^{2})	Population	Map
Gōtsu	江津市	268.51	24,009	
Hamada	浜田市	689.6	57,142	
Izumo	出雲市	624.36	172,039	
Masuda	益田市	733.16	46,892	
Matsue (capital)	松江市	572.99	202,008	
Ōda	大田市	436.11	34,354	
Unnan	雲南市	553.4	38,281	
Yasugi	安来市	420.97	38,875	

=== Towns and villages ===
These are the towns and villages of each district. The number of towns and villages greatly decreased during the mergers. However, they hold about one-third of the prefecture's population.

Name		Area (km^{2})	Population	District	Type	Map
Rōmaji	Kanji	Area (km^{2})	Population	District	Type	Map
Ama	海士町	33.5	2,293	Oki District	Town	
Chibu	知夫村	13.7	657	Oki District	Village	
Iinan	飯南町	242.84	4,908	Iishi District	Town	
Kawamoto	川本町	106.39	3,331	Ōchi District	Town	
Misato	美郷町	282.92	4,712	Ōchi District	Town	
Nishinoshima	西ノ島町	55.98	2,923	Oki District	Town	
Okinoshima	隠岐の島町	242.97	14,422	Oki District	Town	
Okuizumo	奥出雲町	368.06	12,655	Nita District	Town	
Ōnan	邑南町	419.29	10,922	Ōchi District	Town	
Tsuwano	津和野町	307.09	7,478	Kanoashi District	Town	
Yoshika	吉賀町	336.29	6,231	Kanoashi District	Town	

=== Mergers ===
	April 1976		January 2011	January 2012
Izumo Region	Matsue City (Old System)		Matsue City (New System)	Matsue City (August 1, 2011 Merger with Higashiizumo Town)
Izumo Region	Yatsuka District	Kashima Town	Matsue City (New System)	Matsue City (August 1, 2011 Merger with Higashiizumo Town)
Izumo Region	Yatsuka District	Shimane Town	Matsue City (New System)	Matsue City (August 1, 2011 Merger with Higashiizumo Town)
Izumo Region	Yatsuka District	Mihonoseki Town	Matsue City (New System)	Matsue City (August 1, 2011 Merger with Higashiizumo Town)
Izumo Region	Yatsuka District	Yakumo Village	Matsue City (New System)	Matsue City (August 1, 2011 Merger with Higashiizumo Town)
Izumo Region	Yatsuka District	Tamayu Town	Matsue City (New System)	Matsue City (August 1, 2011 Merger with Higashiizumo Town)
Izumo Region	Yatsuka District	Shinji Town	Matsue City (New System)	Matsue City (August 1, 2011 Merger with Higashiizumo Town)
Izumo Region	Yatsuka District	Yatsuka Town	Matsue City (New System)	Matsue City (August 1, 2011 Merger with Higashiizumo Town)
Izumo Region	Yatsuka District	Higashiizumo Town		Matsue City (August 1, 2011 Merger with Higashiizumo Town)
Izumo Region	Yasugi City (Old System)		Yasugi City (New System)	Yasugi City
Izumo Region	Nogi District	Hirose Town	Yasugi City (New System)	Yasugi City
Izumo Region	Nogi District	Hakuta Town	Yasugi City (New System)	Yasugi City
Izumo Region	Nita District	Yokota Town	Okuizumo Town	
Izumo Region	Nita District	Nita Town	Okuizumo Town	
Izumo Region	Izumo City (Old System)		Izumo City (New System)	Izumo City (October 1, 2011 Merger with Hikawa Town)
Izumo Region	Hirata City		Izumo City (New System)	Izumo City (October 1, 2011 Merger with Hikawa Town)
Izumo Region	Hikawa District	Taisha Town	Izumo City (New System)	Izumo City (October 1, 2011 Merger with Hikawa Town)
Izumo Region	Hikawa District	Koryo Town	Izumo City (New System)	Izumo City (October 1, 2011 Merger with Hikawa Town)
Izumo Region	Hikawa District	Taki Town	Izumo City (New System)	Izumo City (October 1, 2011 Merger with Hikawa Town)
Izumo Region	Hikawa District	Sada Town	Izumo City (New System)	Izumo City (October 1, 2011 Merger with Hikawa Town)
Izumo Region	Hikawa District	Hikawa Town		Izumo City (October 1, 2011 Merger with Hikawa Town)
Izumo Region	Ōhara District	Daitō Town	Unnan City	
Izumo Region	Ōhara District	Kamo Town	Unnan City	
Izumo Region	Ōhara District	Kisuki Town	Unnan City	
Izumo Region	Iishi District	Mitoya Town	Unnan City	
Izumo Region	Iishi District	Kakeya Town	Unnan City	
Izumo Region	Iishi District	Yoshida Village	Unnan City	
Izumo Region	Iishi District	Tonbara Town	Iinan Town	
Izumo Region	Iishi District	Akagi Town	Iinan Town	
Iwami Region	Ōda City (Old System)		Ōda City (New System)	Ōda City
Iwami Region	Nima District	Yunotsu Town	Ōda City (New System)	Ōda City
Iwami Region	Nima District	Nima Town	Ōda City (New System)	Ōda City
Iwami Region	Gōtsu City (Old System)		Gōtsu City (New System)	Gōtsu City
Iwami Region	Ōchi District	Sakurae Town	Gōtsu City (New System)	Gōtsu City
Iwami Region	Ōchi District	Ōchi Town	Misato Town	
Iwami Region	Ōchi District	Daiwa Village	Misato Town	
Iwami Region	Ōchi District	Iwami Town	Ōnan Town	
Iwami Region	Ōchi District	Mizuho Town	Ōnan Town	
Iwami Region	Ōchi District	Hasumi Village	Ōnan Town	
Iwami Region	Ōchi District	Kawamoto Town		
Iwami Region	Hamada City (Old System)		Hamada City (New System)	Hamada City
Iwami Region	Naka District	Asahi Town	Hamada City (New System)	Hamada City
Iwami Region	Naka District	Kanagi Town	Hamada City (New System)	Hamada City
Iwami Region	Naka District	Misumi Town	Hamada City (New System)	Hamada City
Iwami Region	Naka District	Yasaka Village	Hamada City (New System)	Hamada City
Iwami Region	Masuda City (Old System)		Masuda City (New System)	Masuda City
Iwami Region	Mino District	Mito Town	Masuda City (New System)	Masuda City
Iwami Region	Mino District	Hikimi Town	Masuda City (New System)	Masuda City
Iwami Region	Kanoashi District	Tsuwano Town (Old System)	Tsuwano Town (New System)	Tsuwano Town
Iwami Region	Kanoashi District	Nichihara Town	Tsuwano Town (New System)	Tsuwano Town
Iwami Region	Kanoashi District	Muikaichi Town	Yoshika Town	
Iwami Region	Kanoashi District	Kakinoki Village	Yoshika Town	
Oki Region	Oki District	Saigō Town	Okinoshima Town	
Oki Region	Oki District	Fuse Village	Okinoshima Town	
Oki Region	Oki District	Goka Village	Okinoshima Town	
Oki Region	Oki District	Tsuma Village	Okinoshima Town	
Oki Region	Oki District	Nishinoshima Town		
Oki Region	Oki District	Ama Town		
Oki Region	Oki District	Chibu Village		

== Climate ==
Shimane prefecture has a sub-tropical climate. Winter is cloudy with a little snow, and summer is humid. The average annual temperature is 14.6 °C (58.3 °F). It rains almost every day in the rainy season, from June to mid-July. The highest average monthly temperature occurs in August with 26.3 °C (79.3 °F). The average annual precipitation is 1,799 millimetres (70.8 in), higher than Tokyo's 1,467 mm (57.8 in) and Obihiro with 920 mm (36.2 in).

Shimane Prefecture Yearly Averages by Region (Statistics Period: 1971 - 2000, Source: Japanese Meteorological Agency: Statistical Climate Information)
Average Year (Month)		Oki			Izumo (Coastal)				Izumo (Inland)		
Average Year (Month)		Okinoshima Saigo	Okinoshima Saigo Cape	Ama	Matsue Kashima	Matsue	Hikawa	Izumo	Okuizumo Yokota	Unnan Kakeya	Iinan Akana
Average Temperature (°C)	Warmest Month	25.6 (Aug)		25.8 (Aug)	25.6 (Aug)	26.3 (Aug)		25.8 (Aug)	24.0 (Aug)	24.5 (Aug)	23.4 (Aug)
Average Temperature (°C)	Coldest Month	3.9 (Feb)		4.5 (Feb)	4.4 (Feb)	4.2 (Jan)		4.5 (Feb)	0.7 (Feb)	2.3 (Feb)	0.4 (Jan, Feb)
Rainfall (mm)	Heaviest Month	211.6 (Sept)		227.0 (July)	218.0 (Sept)	240.5 (July)		236.2 (July)	234.2 (July)	257.1 (July)	282.2 (July)
Rainfall (mm)	Driest Month	110.4 (Oct)		96.4 (Feb)	104.7 (April)	114.5 (April)		96.3 (Feb)	103.4 (April)	120.7 (April)	116.5 (Oct)
Average Year (Month)		Iwami (Coastal)				Iwami (Inland)					
Average Year (Month)		Ōda	Hamada	Masuda	Masuda City Takatsu	Kawamoto	Ōnan	Hamada City Yasaka	Tsuwano	Yoshika	Yoshika Muikaichi
Average Temperature (°C)	Warmest Month	26.5 (Aug)	26.2 (Aug)	26.8 (Aug)		24.2 (Aug)	23.9 (Aug)	23.6 (Aug)	25.7 (Aug)		24.5 (Aug)
Average Temperature (°C)	Coldest Month	4.9 (Jan, Feb)	5.8 (Feb)	5.4 (Jan, Feb)		2.7 (Jan)	0.8 (Jan)	1.5 (Jan)	3.0 (Jan)		1.9 (Jan)
Rainfall (mm)	Heaviest Month	246.3 (July)	257.7 (July)	223.9 (June)		260.2 (July)	260.6 (July)	340.0 (July)	285.6 (July)		337.4 (June)
Rainfall (mm)	Driest Month	98.3 (Feb)	90.9 (Feb)	87.9 (Feb)		112.5 (Feb)	109.2 (Nov)	130.4 (April)	99.7 (Dec)		76.8 (Dec)

== Transportation ==
=== Airports ===
Three airports serve Shimane. The Izumo Airport located in Izumo is the largest airport in the prefecture in terms of passengers and has regular flights to Haneda Airport, Osaka Airport, Fukuoka Airport, and Oki Airport. The Iwami Airport has two flights each day to Haneda and Osaka and 2 arrivals. Oki Airport has scheduled flights to Osaka and Izumo Airports.

- Izumo Airport
- Iwami Airport
- Oki Airport

=== Rail ===
JR West and Ichibata Electric Railway serves the prefecture in terms of rail transportation. The Sanin Main Line goes through the prefecture on the Sea of Japan side into major cities such as Matsue and Izumo. Izumoshi and Matsue stations are the major stops in the prefecture. The Kisuki line, which forks from Shinji Station on the Sanin Line, connects with the Geibi Line in Hiroshima Prefecture, cutting into the Chūgoku Mountains. Ichibata Electric Railway serve the Shimane peninsula from Dentetsu-Izumoshi Station and Izumo Taisha-mae Station to Matsue Shinjiko-Onsen Station.

JR West has three Limited Express trains to Shimane, which are Super Matsukaze, Super Oki, and Yakumo. Additionally, the overnight limited express Sunrise Izumo operates daily between Tokyo and Izumoshi.

- West Japan Railway Company
  - Kisuki Line
  - Sanin Main Line
  - Sankō Line
  - Yamaguchi Line
- Ichibata Electric Railway
  - Kita-Matsue Line
  - Taisha Line

=== Roads ===
==== General roads ====
- Japan National Route 9
  - Izumo Bypass
  - Gōtsu Road
- Japan National Route 54
- Japan National Route 180
- Japan National Route 184
- Japan National Route 186
- Japan National Route 187
- Japan National Route 191
- Japan National Route 261
- Japan National Route 314
- Japan National Route 375
- Japan National Route 431
- Japan National Route 432
- Japan National Route 485
- Japan National Route 488

==== Highways ====
The four expressways in the prefecture connect major cities with other prefectures. The Matsue expressway connects Matsue with Unnan and Yonago in Tottori prefecture. Hamada Expressway forks from the Chūgoku Expressway at Kita-Hiroshima and stretches to Hamada.

- Sanin Expressway
- Matsue Expressway
- Hamada Expressway
- Chūgoku Expressway

=== Ferries ===
- Oki Kisen

=== Gallery ===
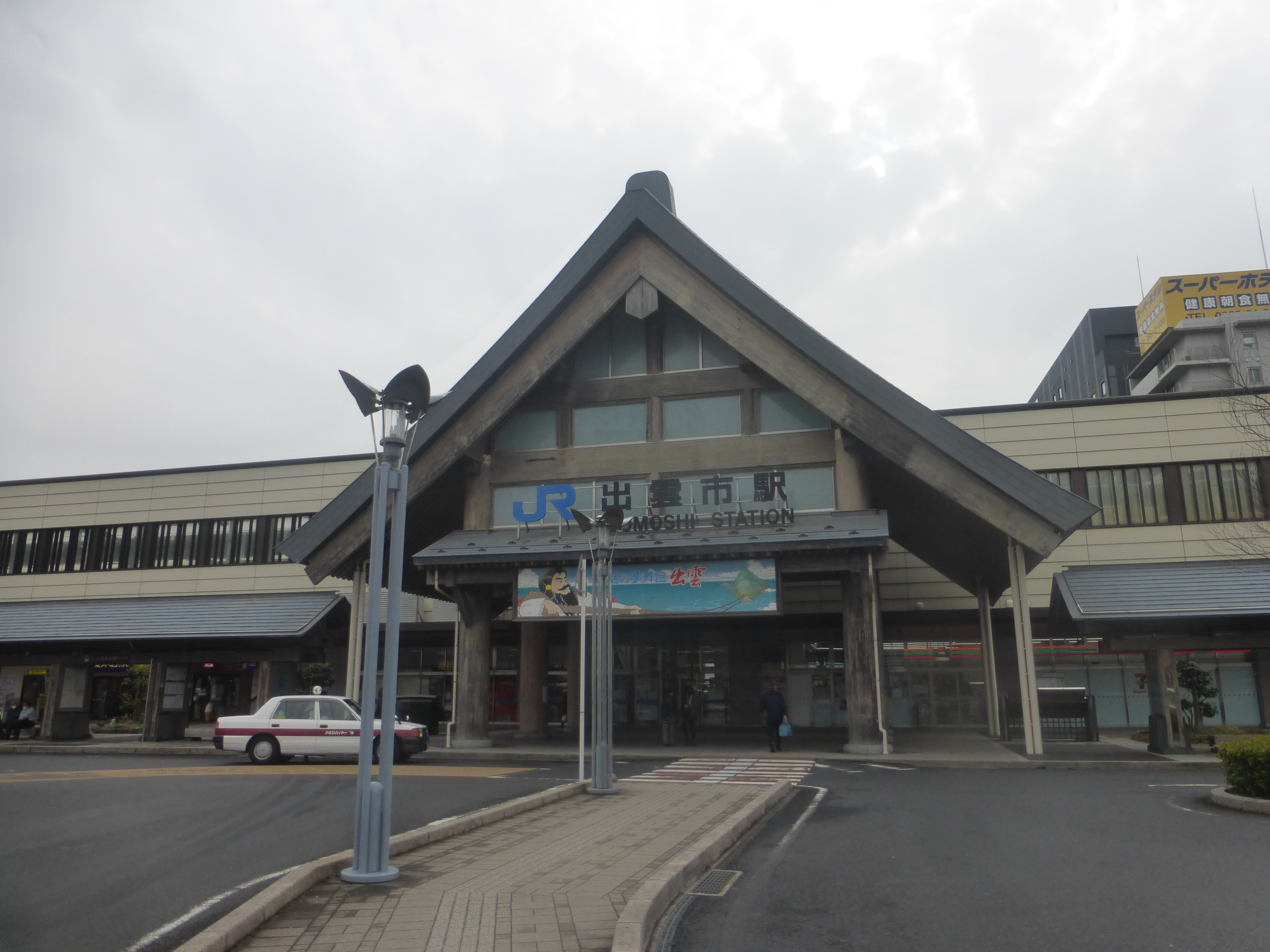
JR Izumo Station

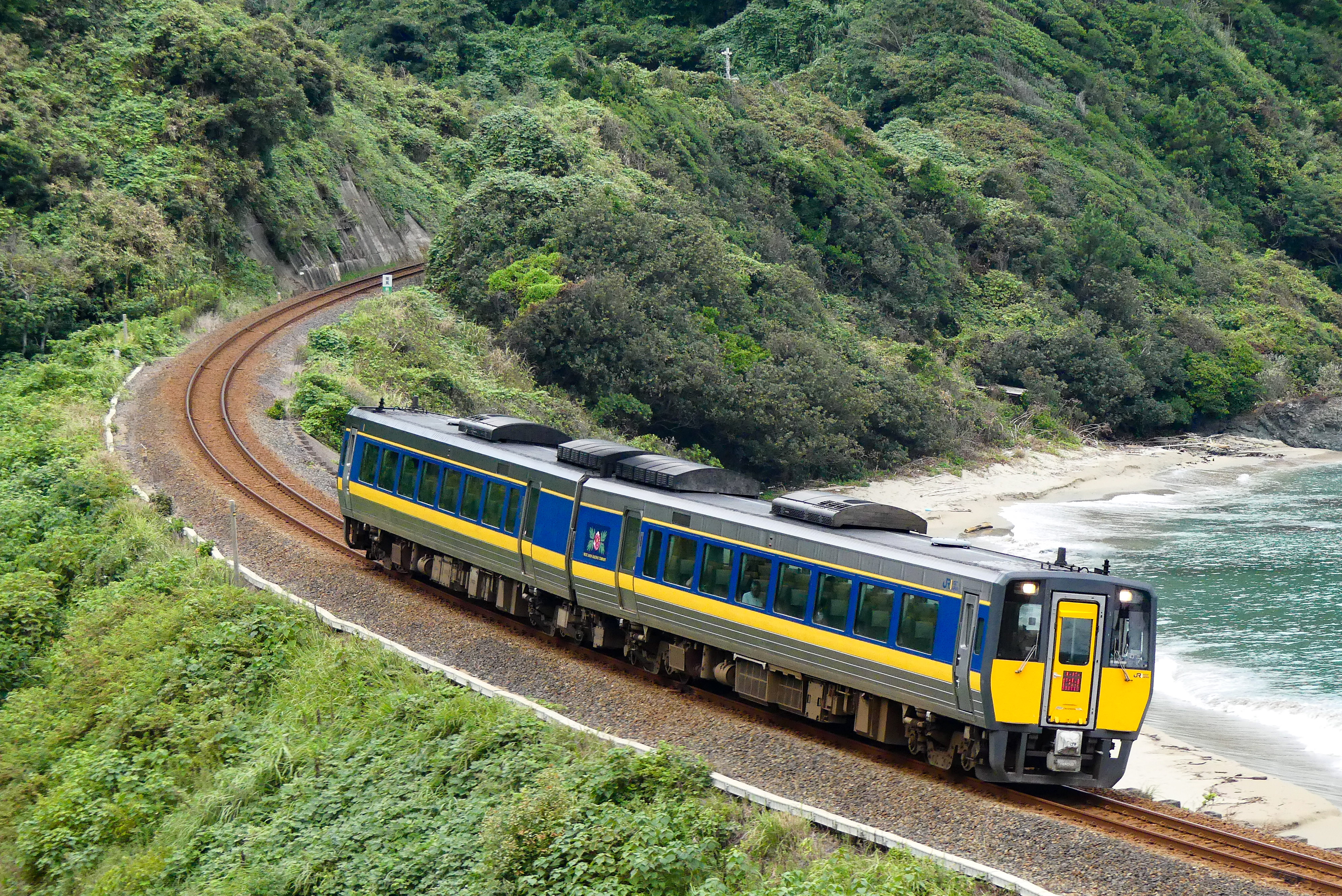
Super Oki express in Sanin Line

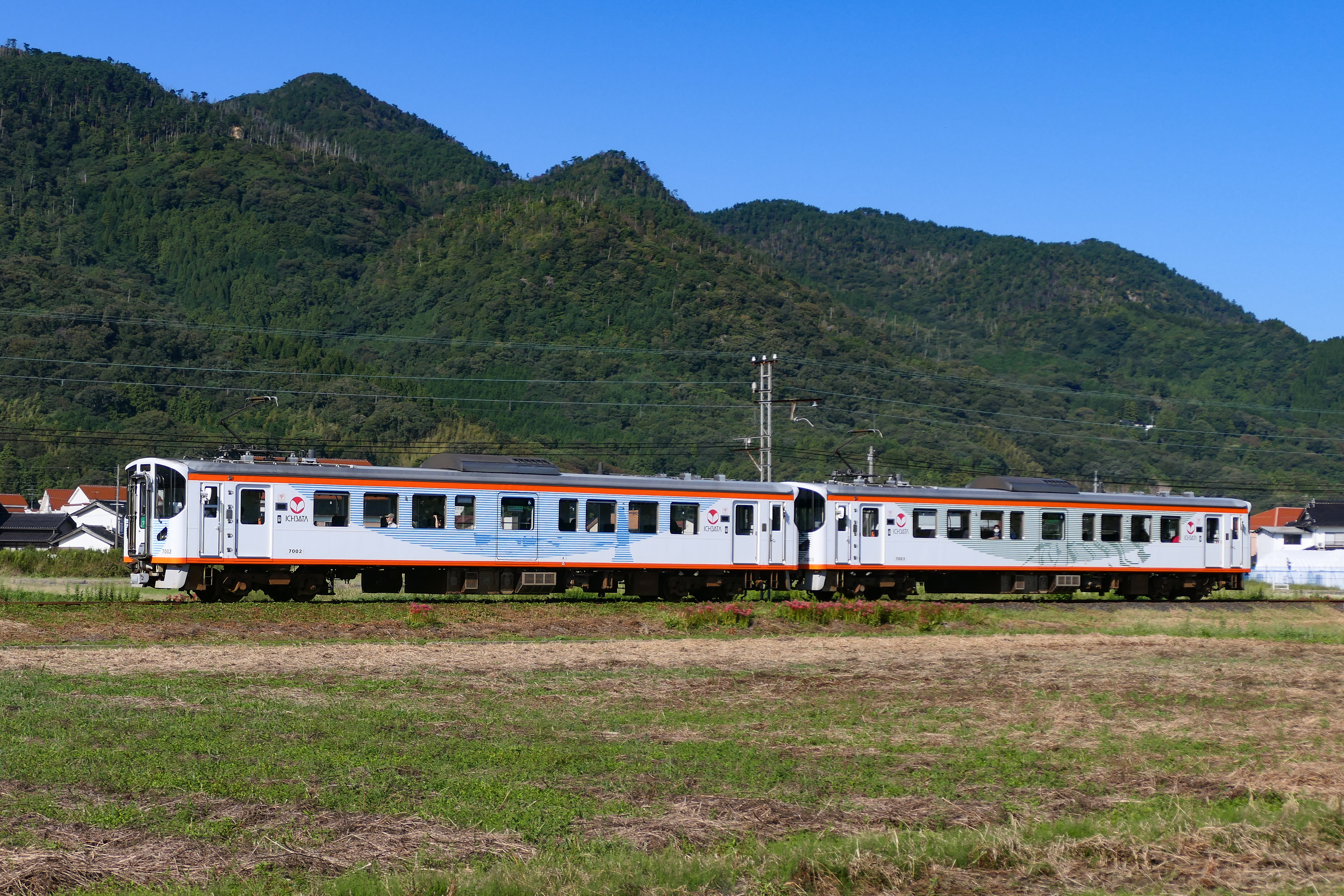
Ichibata Electric Railway

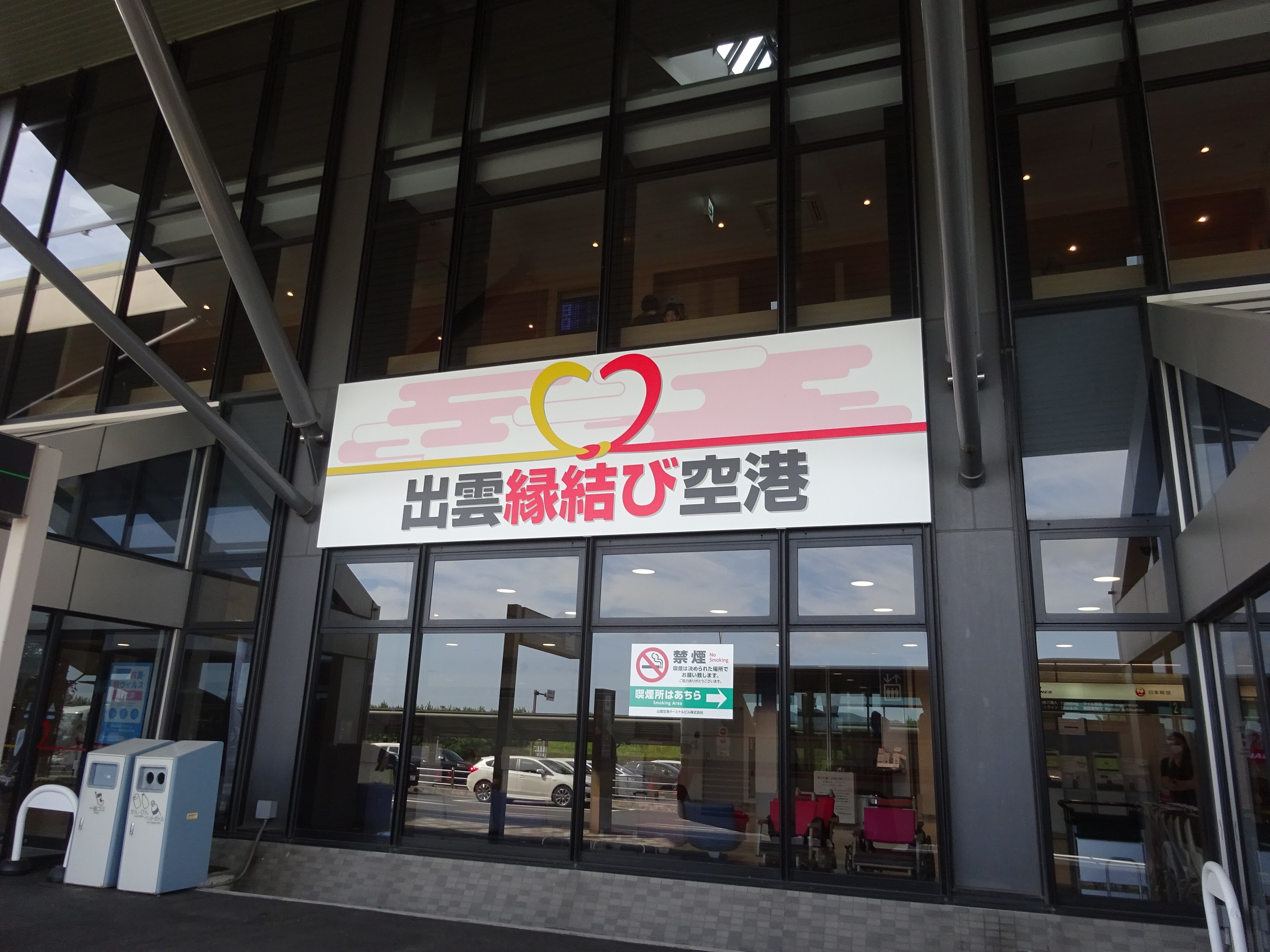
Izumo Enmusubi Airport

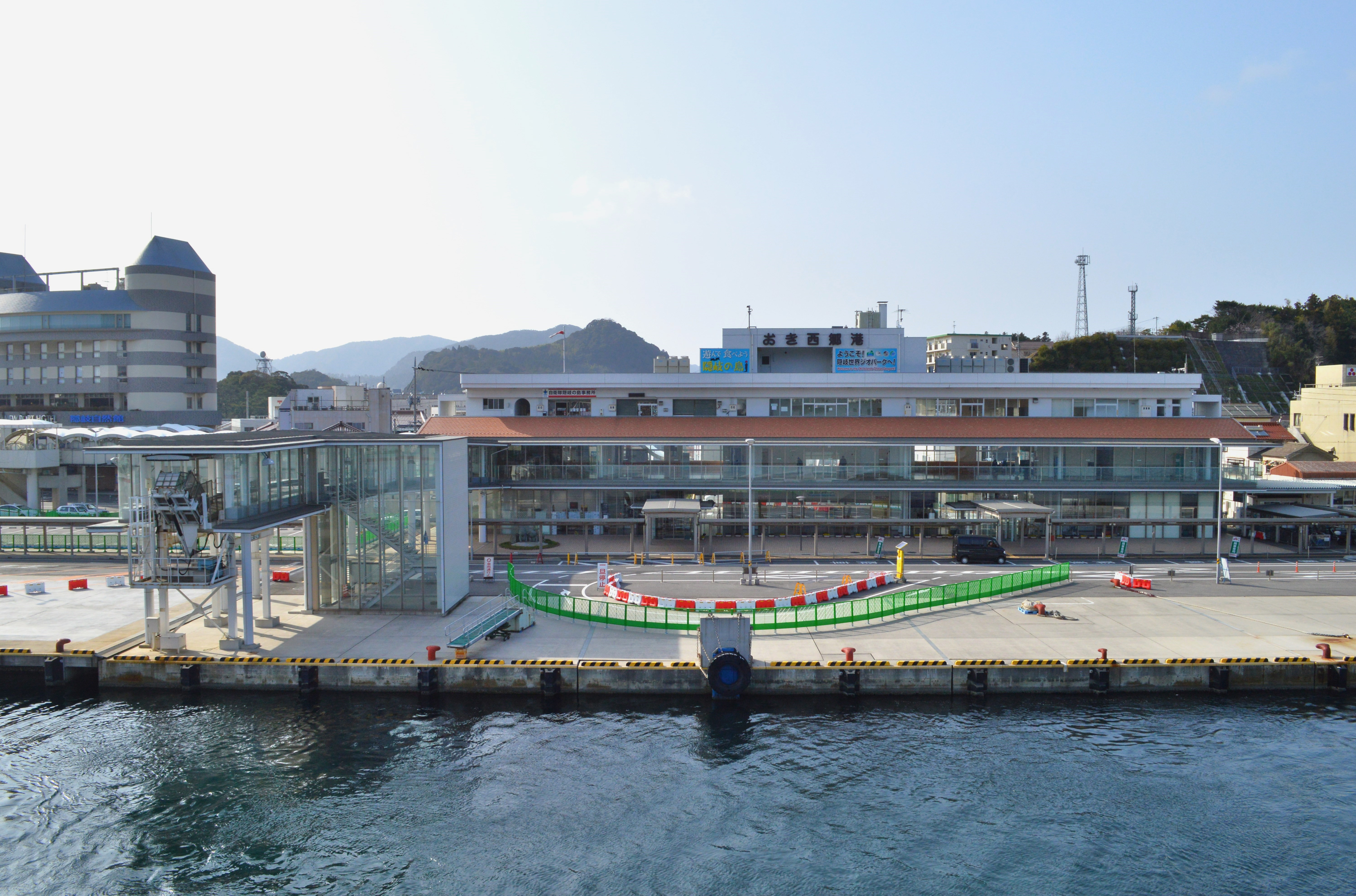
Oki Saigo Port

== Economy ==
In Shimane, the largest employer is the retail industry, employing over 60,000 workers. The supermarket, Mishimaya, and the hardware store, Juntendo, are examples of companies based in Shimane. The manufacturing industry has the second highest number of employees with 49,000 workers.

=== Companies based in Shimane ===
==== Manufacturing ====
- Izumo Murata Manufacturing
- Mitsubishi Agricultural Machinery
- Shimane Fujitsu

==== Financial ====
- The San-in Godo Bank
- The Shimane Bank

==== Others ====
- Ichibata Electric Railway
- Juntendo
- Mishimaya
- Network Applied Communication Laboratory

=== Major factories ===
- Hitachi Metals

== Demographics ==
Shimane prefecture population pyramid in 2020

One-third of the prefecture's population is concentrated in the Izumo-Matsue area. Otherwise, over two-thirds of the population is on the coastline. A reason for the population distribution is that the Chūgoku Mountains make the land inland harder to inhabit. The capital, Matsue, has the smallest population of all 47 prefectural capitals. Shimane has also the largest percentage of elderly people. The province had an estimated 743 centenarians per million inhabitants in September 2010, the highest ratio in Japan, overtaking Okinawa Prefecture (667 centenarians per million).

=== Population by age ===
Total Population in age groups
2007 Estimated Population
Unit: Thousands

Age	Population
0 - 4	30
5 - 9	33
10 - 14	35
15 - 19	37
20 - 24	32
25 - 29	38
30 - 34	44
35 - 39	41
40 - 44	38
45 - 49	44
50 - 54	51
55 - 59	66
60 - 64	44
65 - 69	45
70 - 74	50
75 - 79	45
80 and over	64

Population in age groups by gender
2007 Estimated population
Unit: Thousands

Male	Age	Female
15	0 - 4	15
17	5 - 9	16
18	10 - 14	17
19	15 - 19	18
16	20 - 24	16
19	25 - 29	19
22	30 - 34	22
20	35 - 39	20
19	40 - 44	19
22	45 - 49	22
26	50 - 54	25
34	55 - 59	32
22	60 - 64	23
20	65 - 69	24
22	70 - 74	28
19	75 - 79	26
20	80 and over	44

- Source: Graph 10/Prefectures Age（In Age groups）, Gender divided population－Total Population
  (Ministry of Internal Affairs Statistics Bureau)

Comparison of Population Distribution between Shimane and Japanese National Average
Population Distribution by Age and Sex in Shimane
■ Shimane
■ Japan (average)
■ Male
■ Female

1970	773,575
1975	768,886
1980	784,795
1985	794,629
1990	781,021
1995	771,441
2000	761,503
2005	742,223
2010	716,354

2015 Census, Ministry of Internal Affairs and Communications - Statistics Department

Historical population
Year	Pop.	±%
1920	715,000	—
1930	740,000	+3.5%
1940	741,000	+0.1%
1950	913,000	+23.2%
1960	889,000	−2.6%
1970	773,575	−13.0%
1980	784,795	+1.5%
1990	781,021	−0.5%
2000	761,503	−2.5%
2010	717,397	−5.8%
2020	679,626	−5.3%

== Culture ==
=== Cultural assets ===
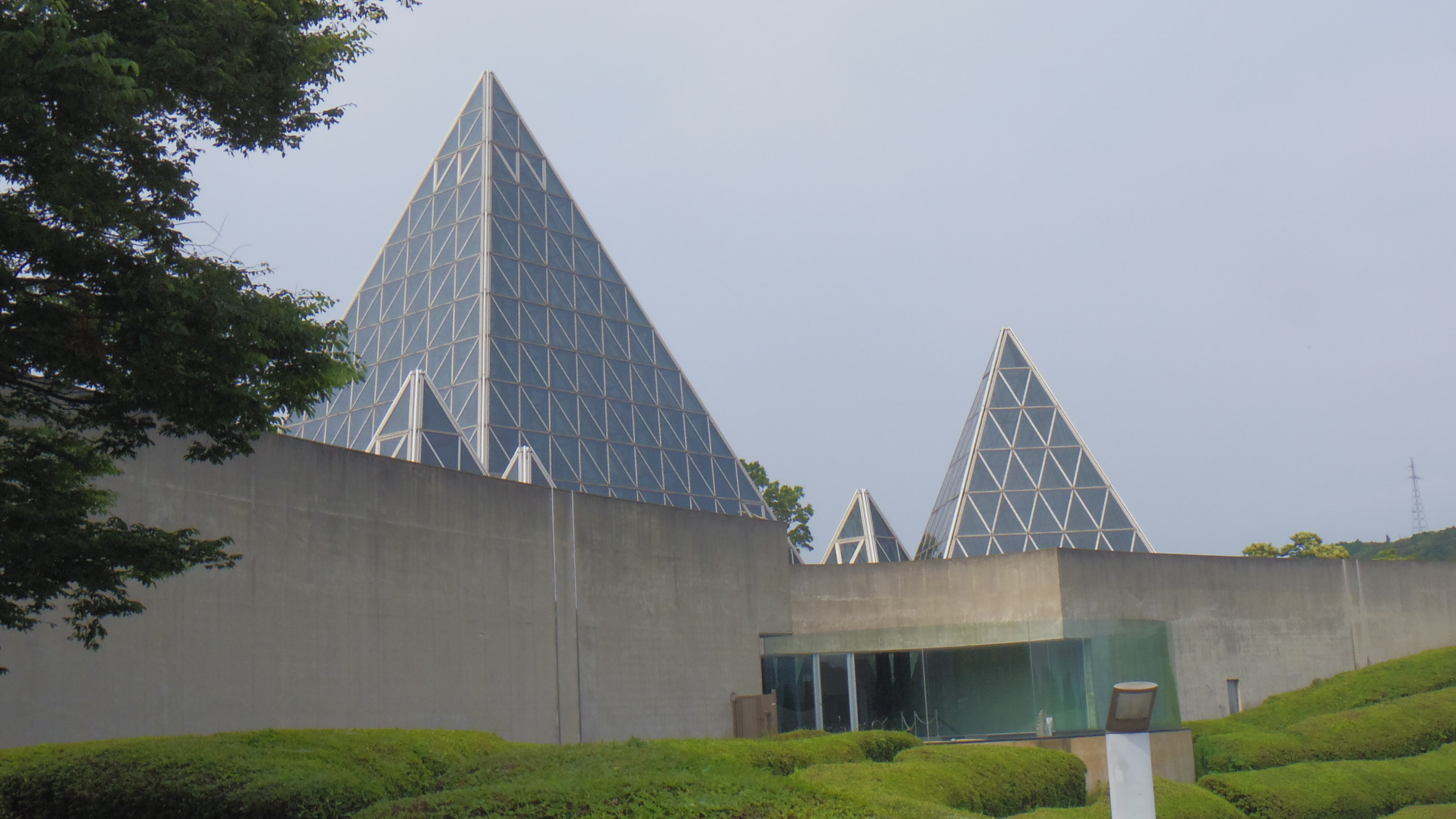
Nima Sand Museum in Oda

World Cultural Heritage

- The Historic Remains of Iwami Ginzan Silver Mine and its Cultural Background (Ōda City)

National Treasures

- Armour Laced with white thread (Hinomisaki Shrine)
- Bronze bells from the Kamo-Iwakura site Unearthed bronze bell-shaped vessel (Unnan City)
- Izumo-taisha Main Shrine (Izumo City)
- Kamosu Shrine Main Shrine (Matsue City)
- Kojindani Ruins Unearthed ruins (Izumo City)
- Toiletry case with autumn field and deer design (Izumo-taisha)

Important Traditional Building Preservation Area

- Ōmori (Ōda City)
- Yunotsu (Ōda City)

=== Dialects ===
- Iwami dialect
- Unpaku dialect (Izumo dialect, Oki dialect, etc.)

=== Universities in Shimane Prefecture ===
- Shimane University, Matsue and Izumo (National university)
- The University of Shimane, Hamada (Prefectural university)

== Tourism ==
- Adachi Museum of Art
- Aquas Aquarium
- Iwami Art Museum
- Iwami Ginzan Silver Mine
- Izumo-taisha
- Izumo Province
- Matsue Castle
- Mt. Sanbe
- Shimane Art Museum
- Shimane Vogel Park
- Shimane Winery
- Tamatsukuri Onsen

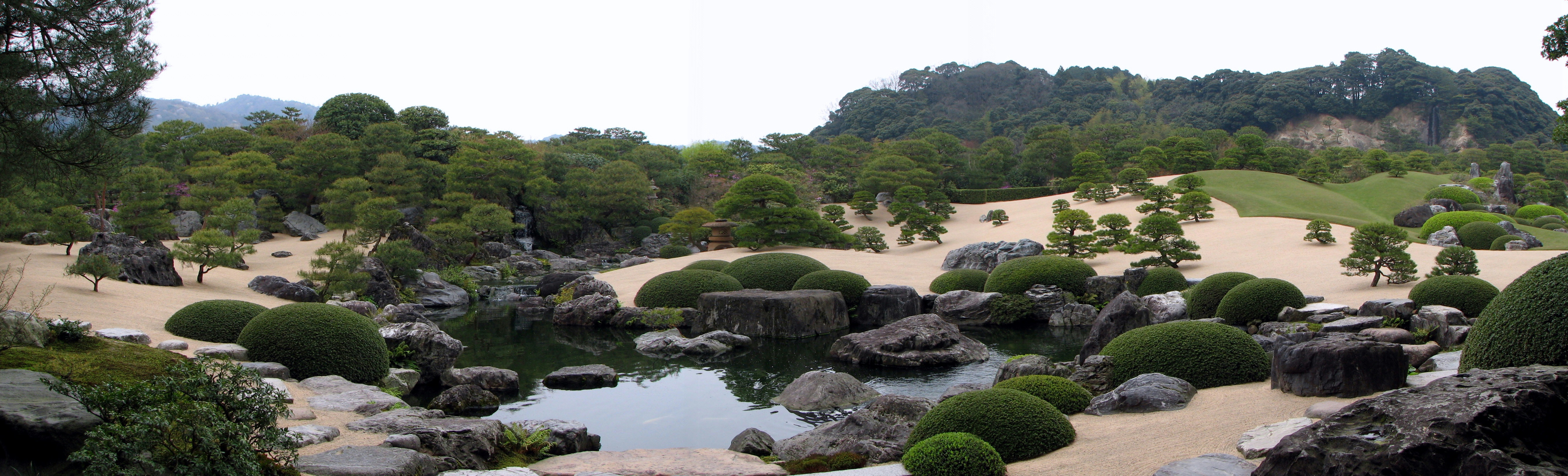
Garden of the Adachi Museum of Art in Yasugi

== Prefectural symbols ==
The prefectural flower is the mountain peony. On the island of Daikonjima, they have been grown from at least the 18th century.

== See also ==
- Lafcadio Hearn
