= Iwami Province =

Former province of Japan

Map of Japanese provinces (1868) with Iwami Province highlighted

Iwami Province (石見国, Iwami no Kuni; Japanese pronunciation: [í.β̞ä̀.mʲì (nò̞ kɯ̈̀.ɲ̟ì)]) was an old province of Japan in the area that is today the western part of Shimane Prefecture. It was sometimes called Sekishū (石州). Iwami bordered Aki, Bingo, Izumo, Nagato, and Suō provinces.

In the Heian period (794–1192) the capital was at modern-day Hamada. In the Kamakura period (1192–1333) the Masuda clan belonged to the Minamoto clan (Genji) and conquered Iwami Province. From the sixteenth century onwards, it played an important role in East Asia's economic history as a major silver source.

== History ==
During the Muromachi and Sengoku periods, the battles were very furious in this area. At first, the Masuda clan was in alliance with the Ōuchi clan in neighboring Suō, but later the Masuda clan belonged to the Mōri clan in neighboring Aki.

On 16 June 1026, a 10 m (33 ft) tsunami struck the Sea of Japan coast of present-day Masuda, Shimane, killing more than 1,000 people.

Maps of Japan and Iwami Province were reformed in the 1870s when the prefecture system was introduced. At the same time, the province continued to exist for some purposes. For example, Iwami is explicitly recognized in treaties in 1894 (a) between Japan and the United States and (b) between Japan and the United Kingdom.

== Historical districts ==
- Shimane Prefecture
  - Ano District (安濃郡) - dissolved
  - Kanoashi District (鹿足郡)
  - Mino District (美濃郡) - dissolved
  - Naka District (那賀郡) - dissolved
  - Nima District (邇摩郡) - dissolved
  - Ōchi District (邑智郡)

== See also ==
- Japanese battleship Iwami
- Iwami Ginzan Silver Mine
- Hamada Domain
- Tsuwano Domain
