= Jifuku Station =

Railway station in Yamaguchi, Yamaguchi Prefecture, Japan

Jifuku Station 地福駅
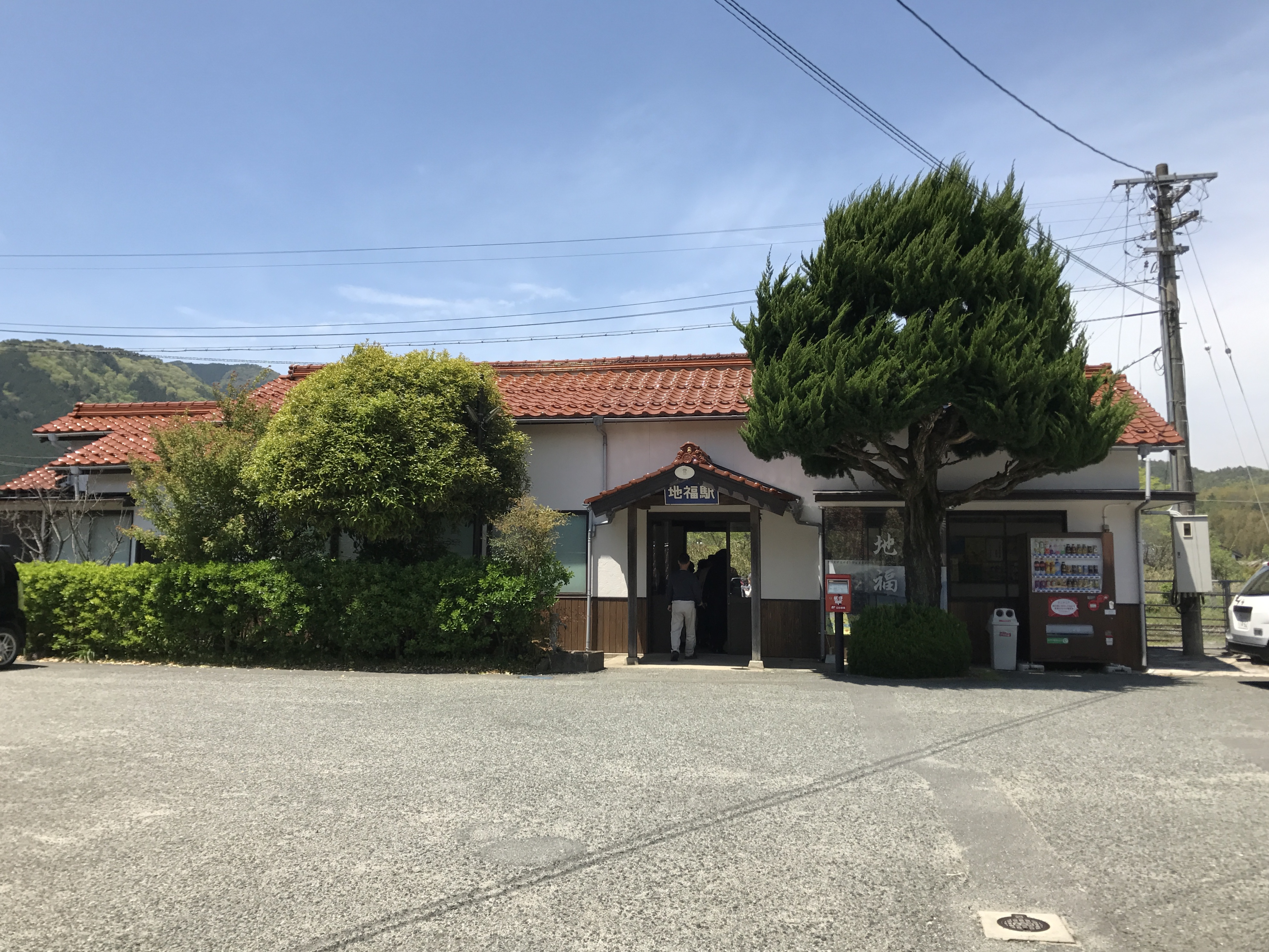
- Jifuku Station in May 2017

General information
- Location: Atojifukukami, Yamaguchi-shi, Yamaguchi-ken, 759-1421; Japan
- Coordinates: 34°21′46.47″N 131°40′27.97″E
- Owner: West Japan Railway Company
- Operator: West Japan Railway Company
- Line: Yamaguchi Line
- Distance: 43.9 km (27.3 miles) from Shin-Yamaguchi
- Platforms: 1 island platform
- Tracks: 2
- Connections: Bus stop

Other information
- Status: Unstaffed
- Website: Official website

History
- Opened: 3 November 1918; 108 years ago

Passengers
- FY2020: 15

Services
Preceding station	JR West	Following station
Nagusa towards Shin-Yamaguchi	Yamaguchi Line Local	Nabekura towards Masuda
Location
- Location within Yamaguchi Prefecture Location within Japan

Jifuku Station (地福駅, Jifuku-eki) is a passenger railway station located in the city of Yamaguchi, Yamaguchi Prefecture, Japan. It is operated by the West Japan Railway Company (JR West).

== Lines ==
Jifuku Station is served by the JR West Yamaguchi Line, and is located 43.9 kilometers from the terminus of the line at Shin-Yamaguchi.

== Station layout ==
The station consists of one ground-level unnumbered island platform connected to the station building by a level crossing. The station is unattended.

=== Platforms ===
station side	■ Yamaguchi Line	for Yamaguchi and Shin-Yamaguchi
opposite side	■ Yamaguchi Line	for Tsuwano and Masuda

== History ==
Jifuku Station was opened on 3 November 1918 when the Yamaguchi Line was extended from Mitani Station to Tokusa Station. With the privatization of the Japan National Railway (JNR) on 1 April 1987, the station came under the aegis of the West Japan railway Company (JR West).

== Passenger statistics ==
In fiscal 2020, the station was used by an average of 15 passengers daily.

== Surrounding area ==
- Shimose Apple Village
- Jifuku Hachimangu Shrine
- Yamaguchi Municipal Ato Junior High School

== See also ==
- List of railway stations in Japan
