= Shinome Station =

Railway station in Yamaguchi, Yamaguchi Prefecture, Japan

Shinome Station 篠目駅
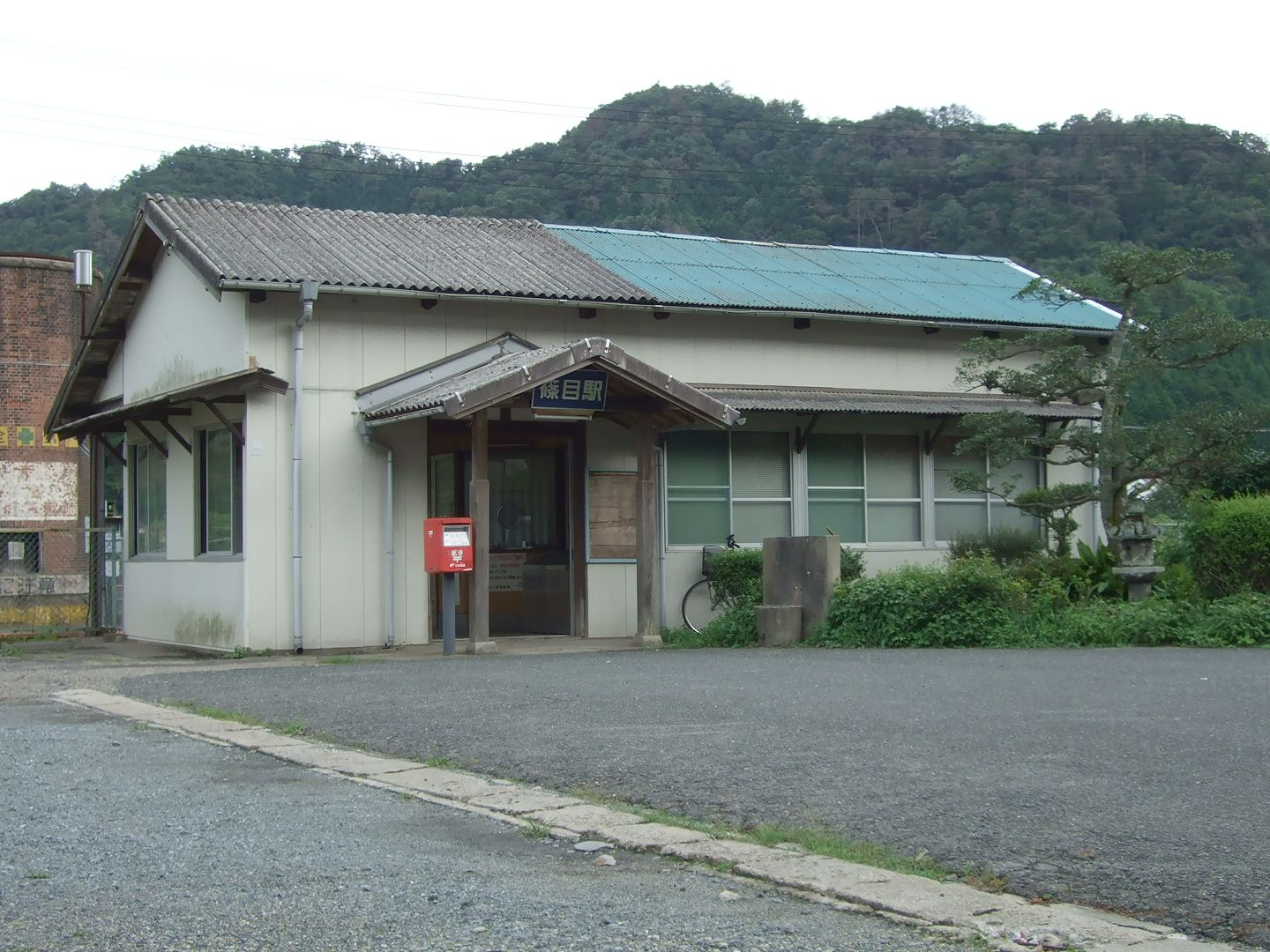
- Shinome Station, August 2008

General information
- Location: Ato-Shinome, Yamaguchi-shi, Yamaguchi-ken,759-1232; Japan
- Coordinates: 34°16′44.40″N 131°33′43.85″E
- Owner: West Japan Railway Company
- Operator: West Japan Railway Company
- Line: Yamaguchi Line
- Distance: 28.9 km (18.0 miles) from Shin-Yamaguchi
- Platforms: 1 island platform
- Tracks: 2
- Connections: Bus stop

Other information
- Status: Unstaffed
- Website: Official website

History
- Opened: 1 July 1917; 109 years ago

Passengers
- FY2020: 5

Services
Preceding station	JR West	Following station
Niho towards Shin-Yamaguchi	Yamaguchi Line Local	Chōmonkyō towards Masuda
Location
- Location within Yamaguchi Prefecture Location within Japan

Shinome Station (篠目駅, Shinome-eki) is a passenger railway station located in the city of Yamaguchi, Yamaguchi Prefecture, Japan. It is operated by the West Japan Railway Company (JR West).

== Lines ==
Shinome Station is served by the JR West Yamaguchi Line, and is located 28.9 kilometers from the terminus of the line at Shin-Yamaguchi.

== Station layout ==
The station consists of one ground-level unnumbered island platform connected to the station building by a level crossing. The station is unattended.

=== Platforms ===
opposite site	■ Yamaguchi Line	for Yamaguchi and Shin-Yamaguchi
station side	■ Yamaguchi Line	for Tsuwano and Masuda

== History ==
Shinome Station was opened on 1 July 1917. With the privatization of the Japan National Railway (JNR) on 1 April 1987, the station came under the aegis of the West Japan railway Company (JR West).

== Passenger statistics ==
In fiscal 2020, the station was used by an average of 5 passengers daily.

== Surrounding area ==
The station is located in a mountainous rural area near the southwestern end of the Ato neighborhood.

== See also ==
- List of railway stations in Japan
