= Super Oki =

Japanese limited express train service

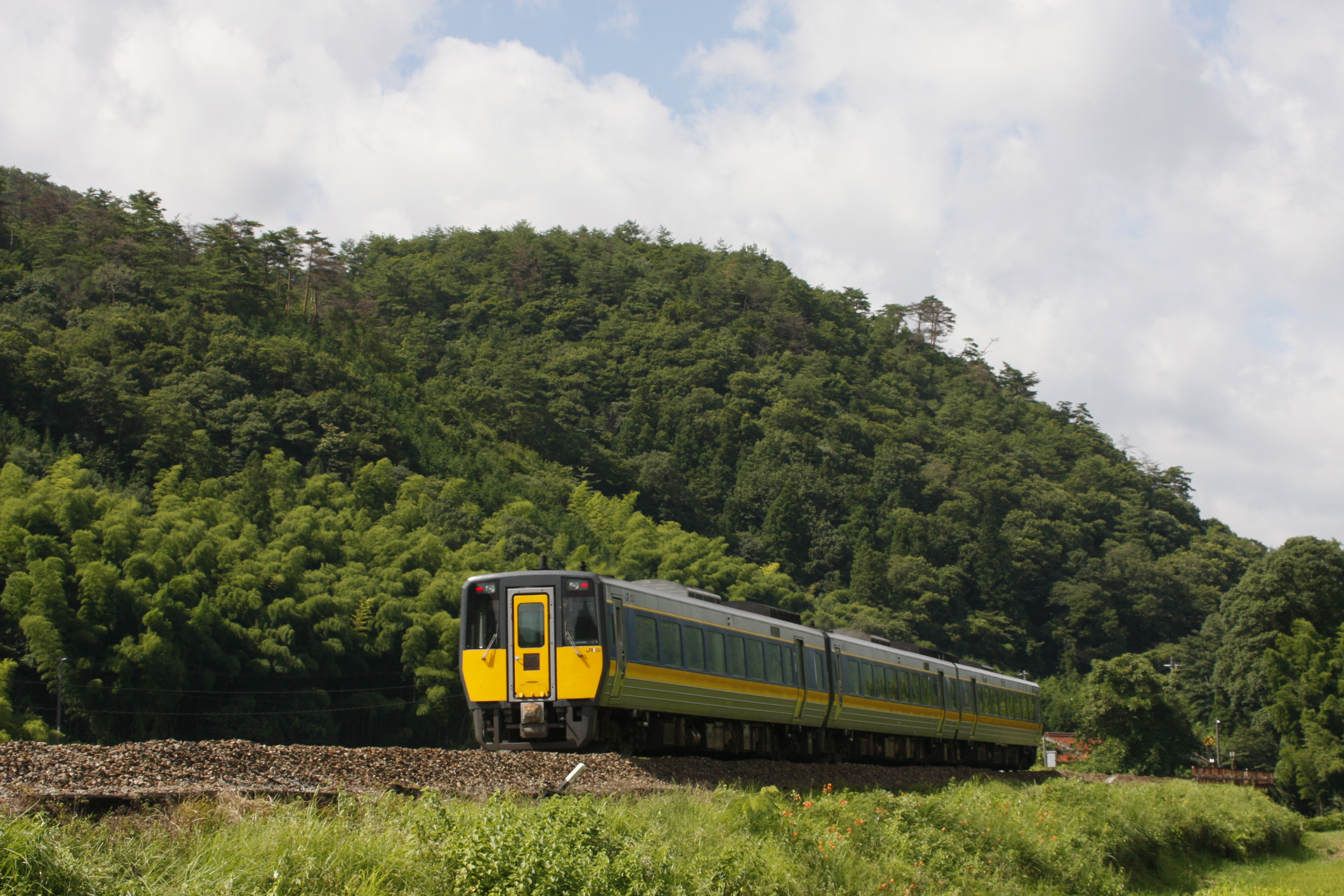
- 3-car KiHa 187 series DMU on a Super Oki service, August 2008

Overview
- Service type: Limited express
- Status: Operational
- Locale: Honshu, Japan
- First service: 7 July 2001
- Current operator: JR West

Route
- Termini: Tottori, Yonago; Shin-Yamaguchi
- Stops: 22
- Distance travelled: 378.0 km (234.9 mi) (Tottori - Shin-Yamaguchi); 285.3 km (177.3 mi) (Yonago - Shin-Yamaguchi)
- Average journey time: 5 hours 15 minutes approx
- Service frequency: 3 return workings daily
- Lines used: Sanin Main Line, Yamaguchi Line

On-board services
- Class: Standard class only
- Disabled access: Yes
- Sleeping arrangements: None
- Catering facilities: None
- Observation facilities: None
- Entertainment facilities: None
- Other facilities: Toilet

Technical
- Rolling stock: KiHa 187 series DMU
- Track gauge: 1,067 mm (3 ft 6 in)
- Electrification: Diesel
- Operating speed: 120 km/h (75 mph)
- Track owner: JR West

The Super Oki (スーパーおき) is a limited express train service in Japan operated by the West Japan Railway Company (JR West) since July 2001. It runs from Tottori via Yonago to Shin-Yamaguchi. The Super Oki is one of the furthest-travelling limited express trains in Japan, covering the 380 km from Shin-Yamaguchi to Tottori in just over five hours.

== Stops ==
Trains stop at the following stations:

Tottori - Kurayoshi - Yonago - Yasugi - Matsue - (Tamatsukuri-Onsen) - (Shinji) - Izumoshi - Ōdashi - (Yunotsu) - Gōtsu - (Hashi) - Hamada - (Miho-Misumi) - Masuda - Nichihara - Tsuwano - Tokusa - Mitani - Yamaguchi - Yudaonsen - Shin-Yamaguchi

Not all trains stop at stations in parentheses.

== Rolling stock ==
Super Oki services are normally formed of two-car KiHa 187 series tilting DMU sets, sometimes lengthened to three or four cars during busy seasons. One car consists is reserved seating; the other, non-reserved. No Green Car is available on this train.

== Formation ==
Two-car trains are formed as shown below, with Car No. 1 at the Shin-Yamaguchi end. All are non-smoking.

Car No.	1	2
Accommodation	Reserved	Non-reserved

== History ==
Super Oki was launched on 7 July 2001.
