= Mitani Station (Yamaguchi) =

Railway station in Yamaguchi, Yamaguchi Prefecture, Japan

Mitani Station 三谷駅
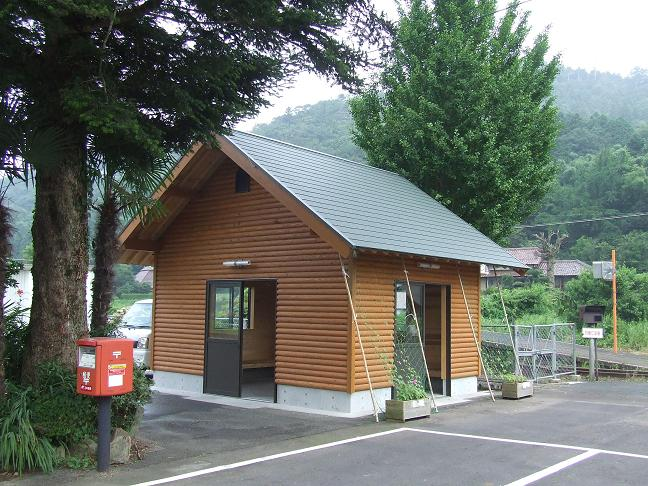
- Mitani Station in July 2010

General information
- Location: Atoikumohigashibun, Yamaguchi-shi, Yamaguchi-ken 759-1231; Japan
- Coordinates: 34°20′30.34″N 131°37′28.16″E
- Owner: West Japan Railway Company
- Operator: West Japan Railway Company
- Line: Yamaguchi Line
- Distance: 38.6 km (24.0 miles) from Shin-Yamaguchi
- Platforms: 1 island platform
- Tracks: 2
- Connections: Bus stop

Other information
- Status: Unstaffed
- Website: Official website

History
- Opened: 18 April 1918; 108 years ago

Passengers
- FY2020: 21

Services
Preceding station	JR West	Following station
Watarigawa towards Shin-Yamaguchi	Yamaguchi Line Local	Nagusa towards Masuda
Location
- Location within Yamaguchi Prefecture Location within Japan

Mitani Station (三谷駅, Mitani-eki) is a passenger railway station located in the city of Yamaguchi, Yamaguchi Prefecture, Japan. It is operated by the West Japan Railway Company (JR West).

== Lines ==
Mitani Station is served by the JR West Yamaguchi Line, and is located 38.6 kilometers from the terminus of the line at Shin-Yamaguchi. Some Super Oki limited express trains stop at this station.

== Station layout ==
The station consists of one ground-level unnumbered island platform connected by level crossing. The station is unattended.

=== Platforms ===
station side	■ Yamaguchi Line	for Yamaguchi and Shin-Yamaguchi
opposite side	■ Yamaguchi Line	for Tsuwano and Masuda

== History ==
Mitani Station was opened on 18 April 1918 when the Yamaguchi Line was extended from Shinome Station. With the privatization of the Japan National Railway (JNR) on 1 April 1987, the station came under the aegis of the West Japan railway Company (JR West). On 16 May 2001, the station building was destroyed in a fire that was thought to have been caused by a short circuit, but JR West initially refused to rebuild it on the grounds of unprofitability. A new station building was built in 2010 at local expense.

== Passenger statistics ==
In fiscal 2020, the station was used by an average of 21 passengers daily.

== Surrounding area ==
- Japan National Route 9
- Yamaguchi Prefectural Road No. 11 Hagi Shino Line

== See also ==
- List of railway stations in Japan
