= Funahirayama Station =

Railway station in Yamaguchi, Yamaguchi Prefecture, Japan

Funahirayama Station 船平山駅
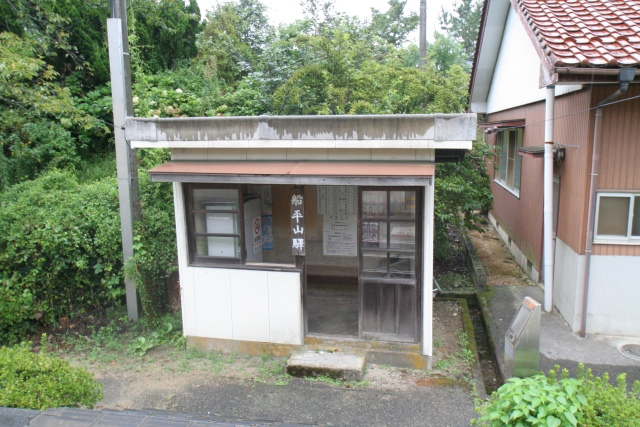
- Funahirayama Station in August 2007

General information
- Location: Atotokusanaka, Yamaguchi-shi, Yamaguchi-ken 759-1512; Japan
- Coordinates: 34°25′17.23″N 131°44′2.99″E
- Owner: West Japan Railway Company
- Operator: West Japan Railway Company
- Line: Yamaguchi Line
- Distance: 52.8 km (32.8 miles) from Shin-Yamaguchi
- Platforms: 1 side platform
- Tracks: 1
- Connections: Bus stop

Other information
- Status: Unstaffed
- Website: Official website

History
- Opened: 1 April 1961; 65 years ago

Passengers
- FY2020: 3

Services
| Preceding station | JR West | Following station |
|---|---|---|
| Tokusa towards Shin-Yamaguchi | Yamaguchi Line Local | Tsuwano towards Masuda |
Location
- Location within Yamaguchi Prefecture Location within Japan

Funahirayama Station (船平山駅, Funahirayama-eki) is a passenger railway station located in the city of Yamaguchi, Yamaguchi Prefecture, Japan. It is operated by the West Japan Railway Company (JR West).

== Lines ==
Funahirayama Station is served by the JR West Yamaguchi Line, and is located 52.8 kilometers from the terminus of the line at Shin-Yamaguchi.

== Station layout ==
The station consists of one ground-level side platform serving a single bi-directional track. There is no station building, but only a small shelter on the platform. The station is unattended.

== History ==
Funahirayama Station was opened on 1 April 1961. With the privatization of the Japan National Railway (JNR) on 1 April 1987, the station came under the aegis of the West Japan railway Company (JR West).

== Passenger statistics ==
In fiscal 2020, the station was used by an average of 3 passengers daily.

== Surrounding area ==
- Senpukuji Temple
- Funahirayama Ski Resort

== See also ==
- List of railway stations in Japan
