= Nabekura Station =

Railway station in Yamaguchi, Yamaguchi Prefecture, Japan

Nabekura Station 鍋倉駅
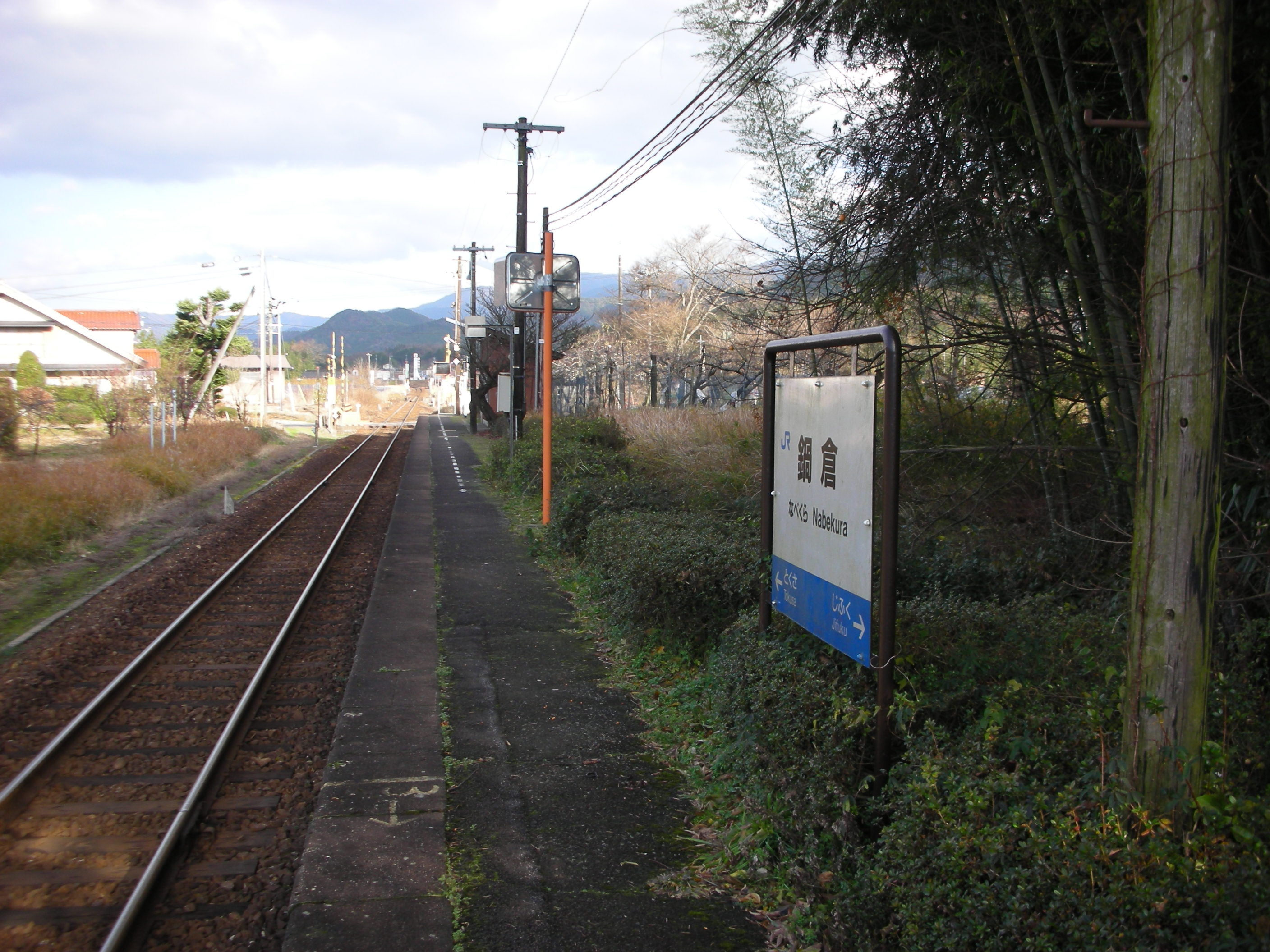
- Nabekura Station in December 2008

General information
- Location: Atotokusashimo, Yamaguchi-shi, Yamaguchi-ken 759-1513; Japan
- Coordinates: 34°22′41.96″N 131°41′39.67″E
- Owner: West Japan Railway Company
- Operator: West Japan Railway Company
- Line: Yamaguchi Line
- Distance: 46.4 km (28.8 miles) from Shin-Yamaguchi
- Platforms: 1 side platforms
- Tracks: 1
- Connections: Bus stop

Other information
- Status: Unstaffed
- Website: Official website

History
- Opened: 17 July 1962; 64 years ago

Passengers
- FY2020: 4

Services
Preceding station	JR West	Following station
Jifuku towards Shin-Yamaguchi	Yamaguchi Line Local	Tokusa towards Masuda
Location
- Location within Yamaguchi Prefecture Location within Japan

Nabekura Station (鍋倉駅, Nabekura-eki) is a passenger railway station located in the city of Yamaguchi, Yamaguchi Prefecture, Japan. It is operated by the West Japan Railway Company (JR West).

== Lines ==
Nabekura Station is served by the JR West Yamaguchi Line, and is located 46.4 kilometers from the terminus of the line at Shin-Yamaguchi.

== Station layout ==
The station consists of one ground-level side platform serving a single bi-directional line. There is no station building, but only a small shelter on the platform. The station is unattended.

== History ==
Nabekura Station was opened on 17 July 1962 as a temporary stop and elevated to the status of a full passenger station on 1 October 1963. With the privatization of the Japan National Railway (JNR) on 1 April 1987, the station came under the aegis of the West Japan railway Company (JR West).

== Passenger statistics ==
In fiscal 2020, the station was used by an average of 4 passengers daily.

== Surrounding area ==
- Japan National Route 9

== See also ==
- List of railway stations in Japan
