= Watarigawa Station =

Railway station in Yamaguchi, Yamaguchi Prefecture, Japan

Watarigawa Station 渡川駅
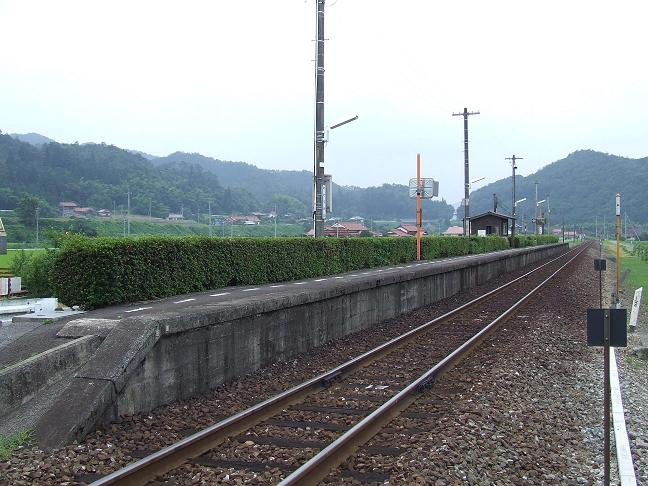
- Watarigawa Station in July 2008

General information
- Location: Atoikumohigashibun, Yamaguchi-shi, Yamaguchi-ken, 759-1231; Japan
- Coordinates: 34°19′22.95″N 131°36′15.41″E
- Owner: West Japan Railway Company
- Operator: West Japan Railway Company
- Line: Yamaguchi Line
- Distance: 35.5 km (22.1 miles) from Shin-Yamaguchi
- Platforms: 1 side platform
- Tracks: 1
- Connections: Bus stop

Other information
- Status: Unstaffed
- Website: Official website

History
- Opened: 1 April 1961; 65 years ago

Passengers
- FY2020: 7

Services
Preceding station	JR West	Following station
Chōmonkyō towards Shin-Yamaguchi	Yamaguchi Line Local	Mitani towards Masuda
Location
- Location within Yamaguchi Prefecture Location within Japan

Watarigawa Station (渡川駅, Watarigawa-eki) is a passenger railway station located in the city of Yamaguchi, Yamaguchi Prefecture, Japan. It is operated by the West Japan Railway Company (JR West).

== Lines ==
Watarigawa Station is served by the JR West Yamaguchi Line, and is located 35.5 kilometers from the terminus of the line at Shin-Yamaguchi.

== Station layout ==
The station consists of one side platform serving a single bi-directional track. There is no station building, but only a small shelter on the platform, and the station is unattended.

== History ==
Watarigawa Station was opened on 1 April 1961. With the privatization of the Japan National Railway (JNR) on 1 April 1987, the station came under the aegis of the West Japan railway Company (JR West).

== Passenger statistics ==
In fiscal 2020, the station was used by an average of 7 passengers daily.

== Surrounding area ==
- Japan National Route 9

== See also ==
- List of railway stations in Japan
