= Seiko Mikami =

- Born: 1961; Shizuoka, Japan
- Died: January 2, 2015 (aged 53–54)
- Education: New York Institute of Technology

Seiko Mikami (Kanji:三上 晴子; 1961 – January 2, 2015) was a Japanese artist known for her large-scale interactive art installations. Mikami was born in Shizuoka, Japan, in 1961, and she stepped into the art scene in the mid-1980s with large-scale art that studied information society and the human body. After moving to the United States in 1991, she studied computer science at the New York Institute of Technology, which lead her art to focus on the interaction between electronics and the human perception. She became a professor in the Department of Information Design at Tama University in 2000. Mikami died from cancer on January 2, 2015.

== Gravicells ==
Unveiled in 2004, a collaboration between Mikami and the architect Sota Ichikawa resulted in Gravicells, an interactive installation originally housed at the Yamaguchi Center for Arts and Media (YCAM). The piece serves as a means for encountering the existence of gravity in a manner one could not experience in his or her daily life, and how the world, our bodies, and our perception are all influenced by gravity in complex and almost delicate ways. When the space is encountered by multiple participants, the visual interactions of the projection between them helps the users achieve a sense of each other. This artwork thus functions as almost an external human sensory function, encouraging awareness of ourselves and others in ways not previously approached.

In the center of the installation space rests a six-by-six-meter paneled floor; these panels are laced with sensors that can detect your weight, tilt, and velocity. This information is continuously collected and analyzed, and is then translated into deformations in the lines projected on the floor near the visitor. GPS data of the location in which the installation is housed also affects the projected environment and the lines will change according to shifts in the location's gravity.

== Desire of Codes ==
One of Mikami's most notable works, Desire of Codes, was commissioned by and created at YCAM. Exploring the individual's existence in public and in private, Desire of Codes emphasizes the increasingly less blurred line between the individual as defined by information and the individual as flesh and blood. Housed in a space normally devoted to theatrical performances, this interactive piece consists of three parts:

1. 90 Wriggling Wall Units: Ninety tentacle-like devices that rotate towards the passerby are placed across a large wall. These devices each have their own camera and microphone, and the data they record is sent to the work's database, and this information is eventually used in part 3.
2. 6 Multiperspective Search Arms: Six 'search arms' with cameras and projectors hang from the ceiling and follow the movement of the visitors. These arms also record information about the visitors and upload this to the database. Eventually the arms may project enlarged images of the visitor on the floor near visitor themselves.
3. Compound Eye Detector Screen: Many hexagonal facets are projected onto a circular screen, and each facet contains either one of the video recordings made by a wall unit or surveillance footage taken from various public places around the world.

In addition to these main three parts, the soundscape of the area in which the work resides is also altered: the noise generated by visitors as well as the artwork's own mechanical sounds are mixed and played back, which further emphasizes the indistinction between one's own encoded existence and physical reality.
