= Kami-Yamaguchi Station =

Railway station in Yamaguchi, Yamaguchi Prefecture, Japan

Kami-Yamaguchi Station 上山口駅
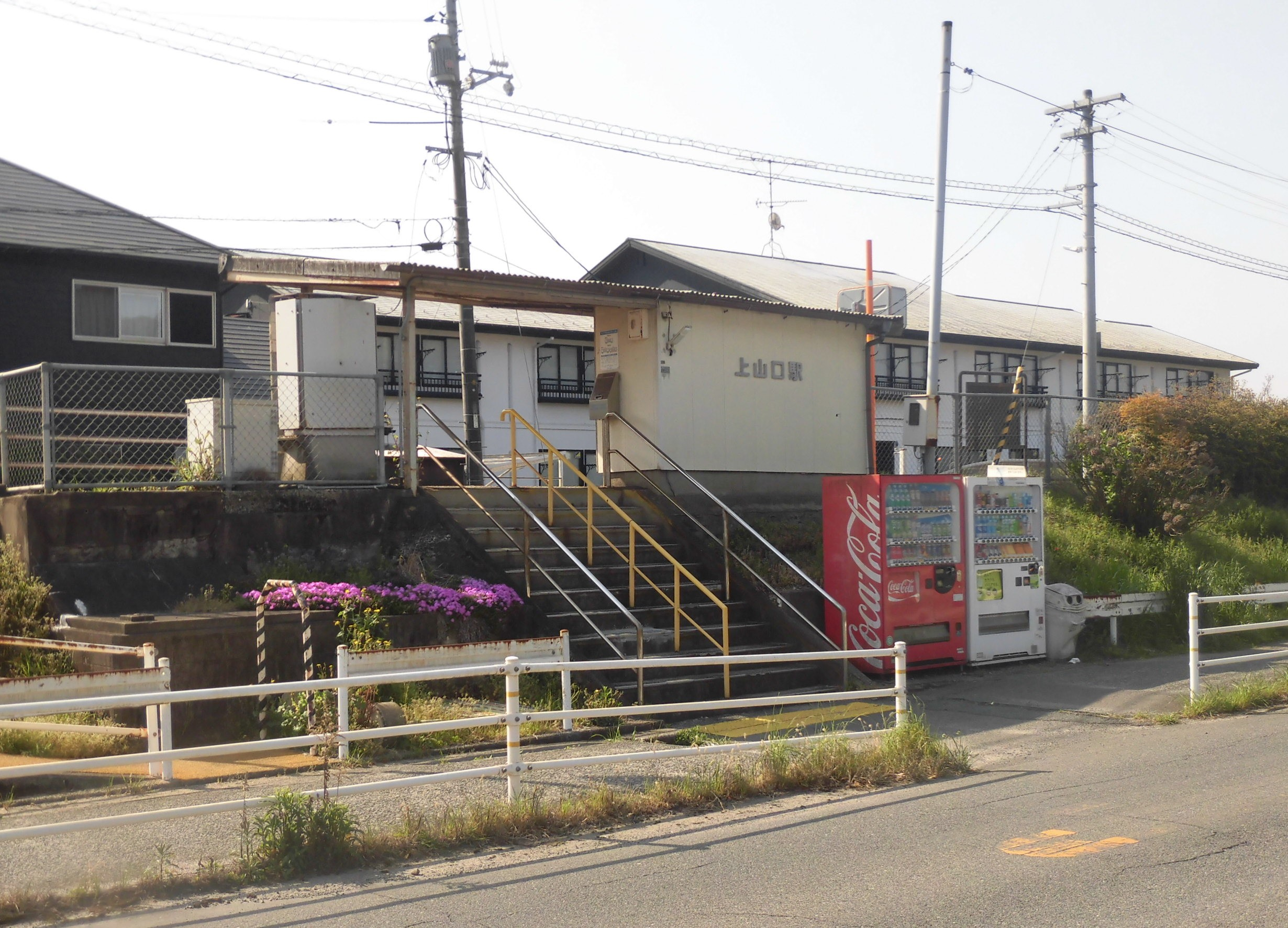
- Kami-Yamaguchi Station in April 2022

General information
- Location: 3 Dōsochō, Yamaguchi-shi, Yamaguchi-ken, 753-0037; Japan
- Coordinates: 34°10′56.61″N 131°29′5.06″E
- Owner: West Japan Railway Company
- Operator: West Japan Railway Company
- Line: Yamaguchi Line
- Distance: 13.9 km (8.6 miles) from Shin-Yamaguchi
- Platforms: 1 side platform
- Tracks: 1
- Connections: Bus stop

Other information
- Status: Unstaffed
- Website: Official website

History
- Opened: 10 April 1953

Passengers
- FY2020: 105

Services
Preceding station	JR West	Following station
Yamaguchi towards Shin-Yamaguchi	Yamaguchi Line Local	Miyano towards Masuda
Location
- Location within Yamaguchi Prefecture Location within Japan

Kami-Yamaguchi Station (上山口駅, Kami-Yamaguchi-eki) is a passenger railway station located in the city of Yamaguchi, Yamaguchi Prefecture, Japan. It is operated by the West Japan Railway Company (JR West).

== Lines ==
Kami-Yamaguchi Station is served by the JR West Yamaguchi Line, and is located 13.9 kilometers from the terminus of the line at Shin-Yamaguchi.

== Station layout ==
The station consists of one side platform serving a single bi-directional track. There is no station building and the station is unattended.

== History ==
Kami-Yamaguchi Station was opened on 10 April 1953. With the privatization of the Japan National Railway (JNR) on 1 April 1987, the station came under the aegis of the West Japan railway Company (JR West).

== Passenger statistics ==
In fiscal 2020, the station was used by an average of 105 passengers daily.

== Surrounding area ==
- Yamaguchi Red Cross Hospital
- Yamaguchi Municipal Odono Elementary School
- Yamaguchi Municipal Odono Junior High School

== See also ==
- List of railway stations in Japan
