= Suō-Shimogō Station =

Railway station in Yamaguchi, Yamaguchi Prefecture, Japan

Suō-Shimogō Station 周防下郷駅
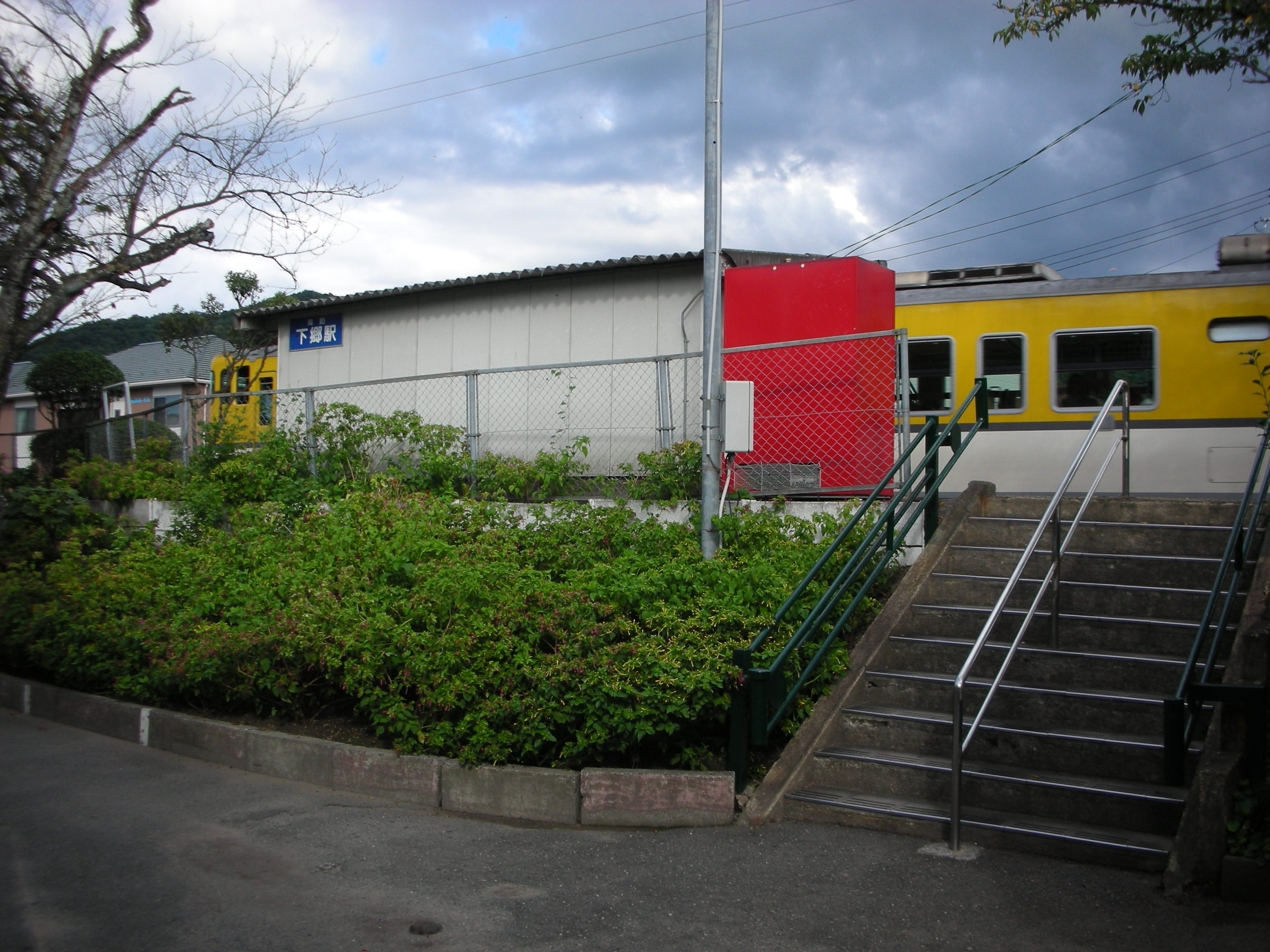
- Suō-Shimogō Station in September 2008

General information
- Location: Ogōrishimogō, Yamaguchi-shi, Yamaguchi-ken, 754-0002; Japan
- Coordinates: 34°6′4.33″N 131°24′6.28″E
- Owner: West Japan Railway Company
- Operator: West Japan Railway Company
- Line: Yamaguchi Line
- Distance: 1.0 km (0.62 miles) from Shin-Yamaguchi
- Platforms: 1 side platform
- Tracks: 1
- Connections: Bus stop

Other information
- Status: Unstaffed
- Website: Official website

History
- Opened: 20 December 1935; 90 years ago

Passengers
- FY2020: 273

Services
Preceding station	JR West	Following station
Shin-Yamaguchi Terminus	Yamaguchi Line Local	Kamigō towards Masuda
Location
- Location within Yamaguchi Prefecture Location within Japan

Suō-Shimogō Station (周防下郷駅, Suō-Shimogō-eki) is a passenger railway station located in the city of Yamaguchi, Yamaguchi Prefecture, Japan. It is operated by the West Japan Railway Company (JR West).

== Lines ==
Suō-Shimogō Station is served by the JR West Yamaguchi Line, and is located 1.0 kilometers from the terminus of the line at Shin-Yamaguchi.

== Station layout ==
The station consists of one side platform serving a single bi-directional track. The entrance to the station is located at the south end of the platform. A shelter and automatic ticket machine are also located there. The station is unattended.

== History ==
Suō-Shimogō Station was opened on 20 December 1935 with the extension of the Yamaguchi Line from Ogōri Station (present-day Shin-Yamaguchi) to Kamigō Station. With the privatization of the Japan National Railway (JNR) on 1 April 1987, the station came under the aegis of the West Japan railway Company (JR West).

== Passenger statistics ==
In fiscal 2020, the station was used by an average of 231 passengers daily.

== Surrounding area ==
- Yamaguchi Prefecture Kojo High School
- Yamaguchi Municipal Ogori Junior High School
- Yamaguchi Municipal Ogori Elementary School

== See also ==
- List of railway stations in Japan
