= Chōmonkyō Station =

Railway station in Yamaguchi, Yamaguchi Prefecture, Japan

Chōmonkyō Station 長門峡駅
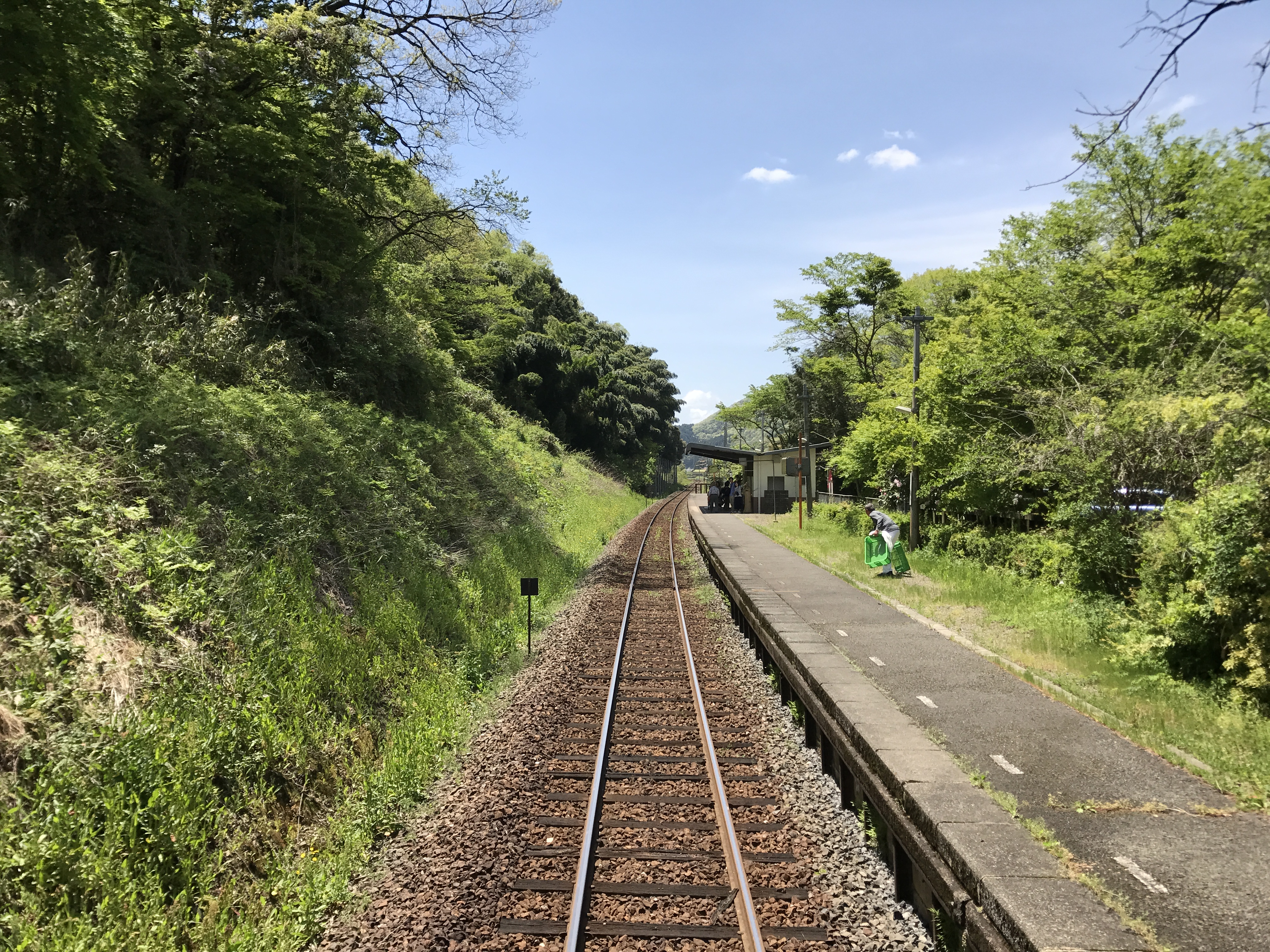
- View from train passing through Chōmonkyō Station

General information
- Location: Atoikumohigashibun, Yamaguchi-shi, Yamaguchi-ken, 759-1231; Japan
- Coordinates: 34°18′16.43″N 131°34′43.88″E
- Owner: West Japan Railway Company
- Operator: West Japan Railway Company
- Line: Yamaguchi Line
- Distance: 32.3 km (20.1 miles) from Shin-Yamaguchi
- Platforms: 1 side platform
- Tracks: 1
- Connections: Bus stop

Other information
- Status: Unstaffed
- Website: Official website

History
- Opened: 29 April 1922; 104 years ago

Passengers
- FY2020: 11

Services
Preceding station	JR West	Following station
Shinome towards Shin-Yamaguchi	Yamaguchi Line Local	Watarigawa towards Masuda
Location
- Location within Yamaguchi Prefecture Location within Japan

Chōmonkyō Station (長門峡駅, Chōmonkyō-eki) is a passenger railway station located in the city of Yamaguchi, Yamaguchi Prefecture, Japan. It is operated by the West Japan Railway Company (JR West).

== Lines ==
Chōmonkyō Station is served by the JR West Yamaguchi Line, and is located 32.3 kilometers from the terminus of the line at Shin-Yamaguchi.

== Station layout ==
The station consists of one ground-level side platform serving a single bi-directional track. The station is unattended.

== History ==
Chōmonkyō Station was opened on 29 April 1922 as a temporary stop and elevated to a full passenger station on 18 July 1928. With the privatization of the Japan National Railway (JNR) on 1 April 1987, the station came under the aegis of the West Japan railway Company (JR West).

== Passenger statistics ==
In fiscal 2020, the station was used by an average of 11 passengers daily.

== Surrounding area ==
- Chōmonkyō Gorge
- Japan National Route 9

== See also ==
- List of railway stations in Japan
