= Tokusa Station =

Railway station in Yamaguchi, Yamaguchi Prefecture, Japan

Tokusa Station 徳佐駅
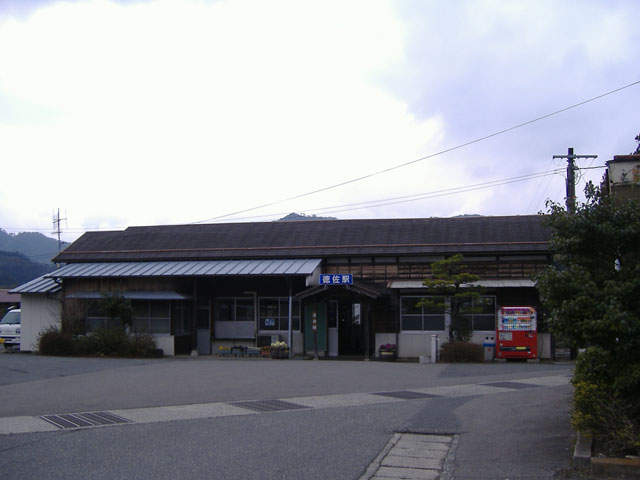
- Tokusa Station in March 2007

General information
- Location: Atotokusanaka, Yamaguchi-shi, Yamaguchi-ken 759-1512; Japan
- Coordinates: 34°23′59.87″N 131°43′13.51″E
- Owner: West Japan Railway Company
- Operator: West Japan Railway Company
- Line: Yamaguchi Line
- Distance: 49.9 km (31.0 miles) from Shin-Yamaguchi
- Platforms: 1 island platforms
- Tracks: 2
- Connections: Bus stop

Other information
- Status: Staffed
- Website: Official website

History
- Opened: 3 November 1918; 108 years ago

Passengers
- FY2020: 65

Services
Preceding station	JR West	Following station
Nabekura towards Shin-Yamaguchi	Yamaguchi Line Local	Funahirayama towards Masuda
Location
- Location within Yamaguchi Prefecture Location within Japan

Tokusa Station (徳佐駅, Tokusa-eki) is a passenger railway station located in the city of Yamaguchi, Yamaguchi Prefecture, Japan. It is operated by the West Japan Railway Company (JR West).

== Lines ==
Tokusa Station is served by the JR West Yamaguchi Line, and is located 49.9 kilometers from the terminus of the line at Shin-Yamaguchi.

== Station layout ==
The station consists of one ground-level island platform connected to the station building by a footbridge. The station building is staffed.

=== Platforms ===
station side	■ Yamaguchi Line	for Yamaguchi and Shin-Yamaguchi
opposite site	■ Yamaguchi Line	for Tsuwano and Masuda

== History ==
Tokusa Station was opened on 3 November 1918 when the Yamaguchi Line was extended from Mitani Station. With the privatization of the Japan National Railway (JNR) on 1 April 1987, the station came under the aegis of the West Japan railway Company (JR West).

== Passenger statistics ==
In fiscal 2020, the station was used by an average of 65 passengers daily.

== Surrounding area ==
- Yamaguchi City Hall Ato General Branch
- Yamaguchi Prefectural Yamaguchi High School Tokusa Branch
- Yamaguchi Municipal Ato Higashi Junior High School
- Yamaguchi Municipal Tokusa Elementary School
- Kitsunezuka Kofun

== See also ==
- List of railway stations in Japan
