= Honmataga Station =

Railway station in Masuda, Shimane Prefecture, Japan

Honmataga Station 本俣賀駅
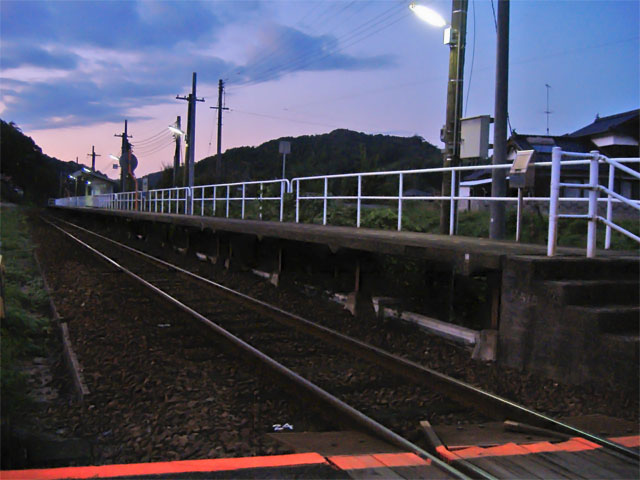
- Honmataga Station in August 2007

General information
- Location: 256 Honmataga-cho, Masuda-shi, Shimane-ken 699-5122; Japan
- Coordinates: 34°39′9.39″N 131°49′37.38″E
- Owner: West Japan Railway Company
- Operator: West Japan Railway Company
- Line: Yamaguchi Line
- Distance: 89.6 km (55.7 miles) from Shin-Yamaguchi
- Platforms: 1 side platform
- Tracks: 1
- Connections: Bus stop

Other information
- Status: Unstaffed
- Website: Official website

History
- Opened: 1 April 1970; 56 years ago

Passengers
- FY2020: 1

Services
Preceding station	JR West	Following station
Iwami-Yokota towards Shin-Yamaguchi	Yamaguchi Line Local	Masuda Terminus
Location
- Location within Shimane Prefecture Location within Japan

Honmataga Station (本俣賀駅, Honmataga-eki) is a passenger railway station located in the city of Masuda, Shimane Prefecture, Japan. It is operated by the West Japan Railway Company (JR West).

== Lines ==
Honmataga Station is served by the JR West Yamaguchi Line, and is located 89.6 kilometers from the terminus of the line at Shin-Yamaguchi.

== Station layout ==
The station consists of one side platform serving a single bi-directional track. There is no station building, only a waiting room on the platform and the station is unattended.

== History ==
Honmataga Station was opened on 1 April 1970. With the privatization of the Japan National Railway (JNR) on 1 April 1987, the station came under the aegis of the West Japan railway Company (JR West).

== Passenger statistics ==
In fiscal 2020, the station was used by an average of 1 passengers daily.

== Surrounding area ==
- Honmataga River

== See also ==
- List of railway stations in Japan
