= Yamaguchi College of Arts =

College in Japan

Coordinates: 34°07′14″N 131°24′11″E

- 山口芸術短期大学
- Established: 1968
- President: Hidetoshi Miike
- Location: 1-7-1, Ogorimiraimachi, Yamaguchi, Yamaguchi, 754-0032, Japan
- Language: Japanese

Yamaguchi College of Arts (山口芸術短期大学, Yamaguchi geijutsu tanki daigaku) is a private junior college in Yamaguchi, Yamaguchi, Japan, established in 1968.

== Department ==
- Department of Nursery
  - Child education course
  - Care welfare course
- Department of Arts
