= Yamaguchi (city) =

Yamaguchi 山口市
- Prefecture capital and City
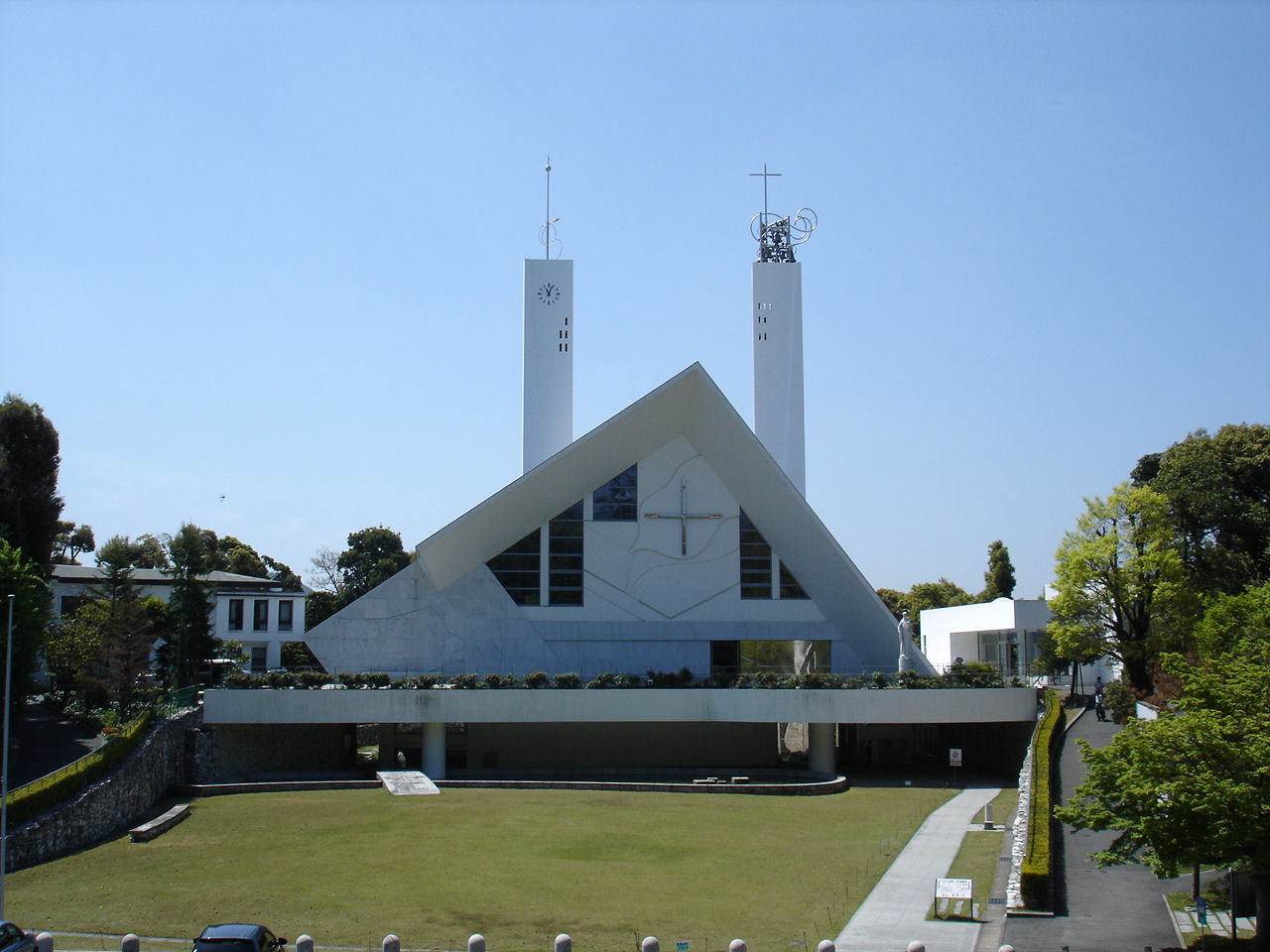
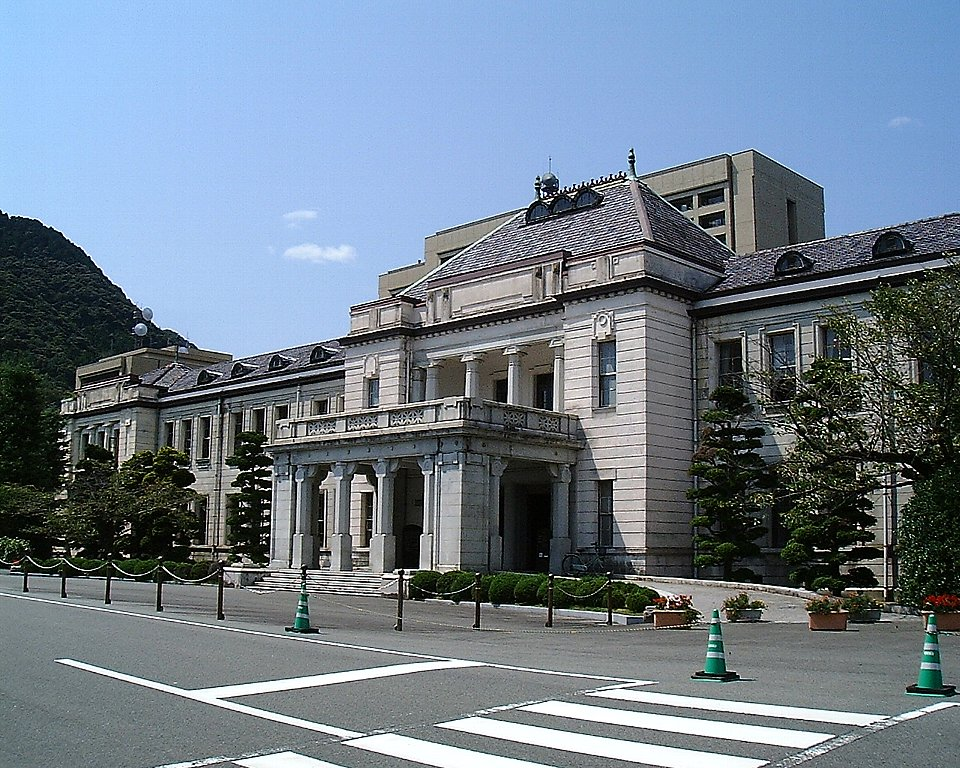
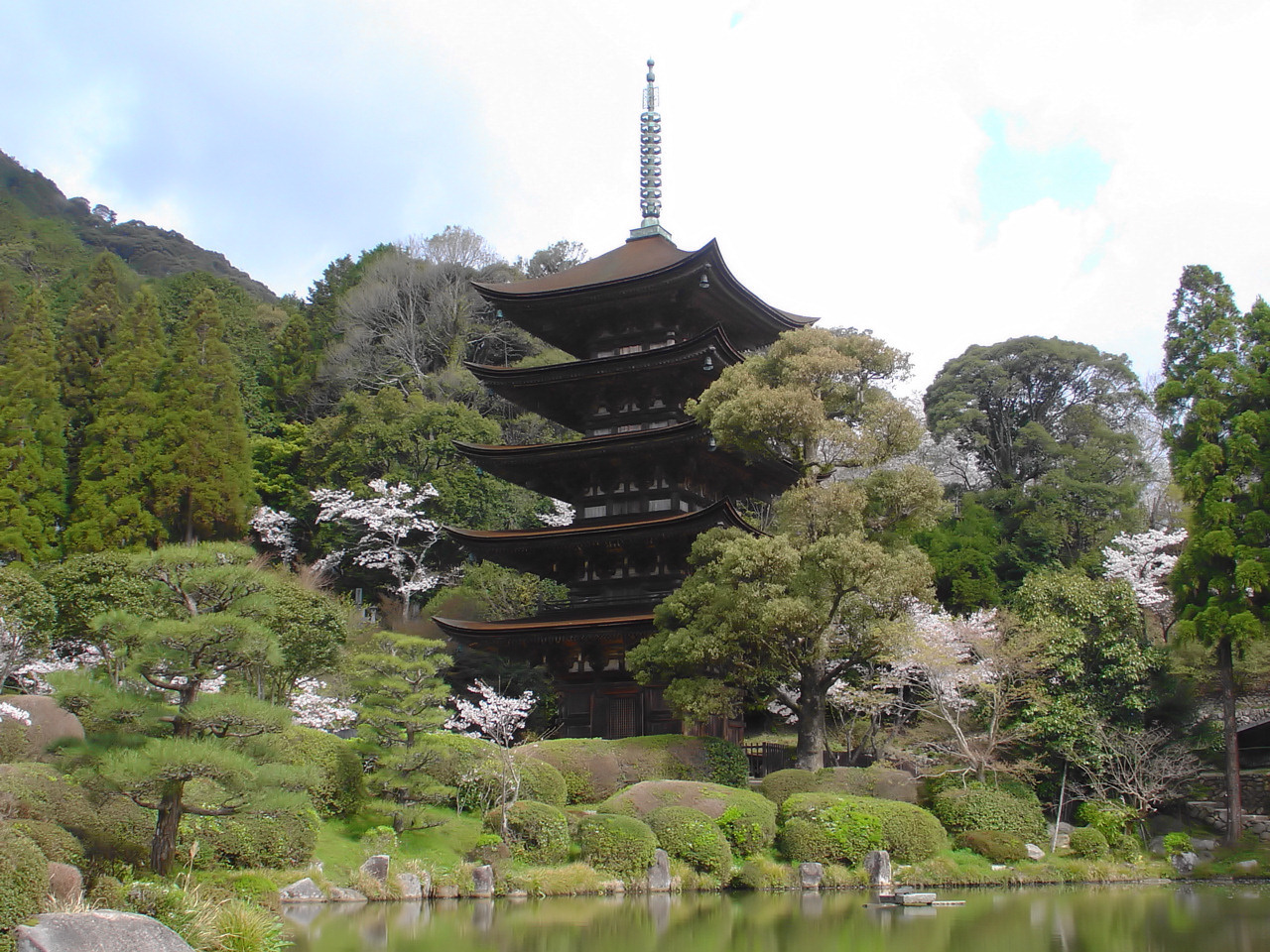
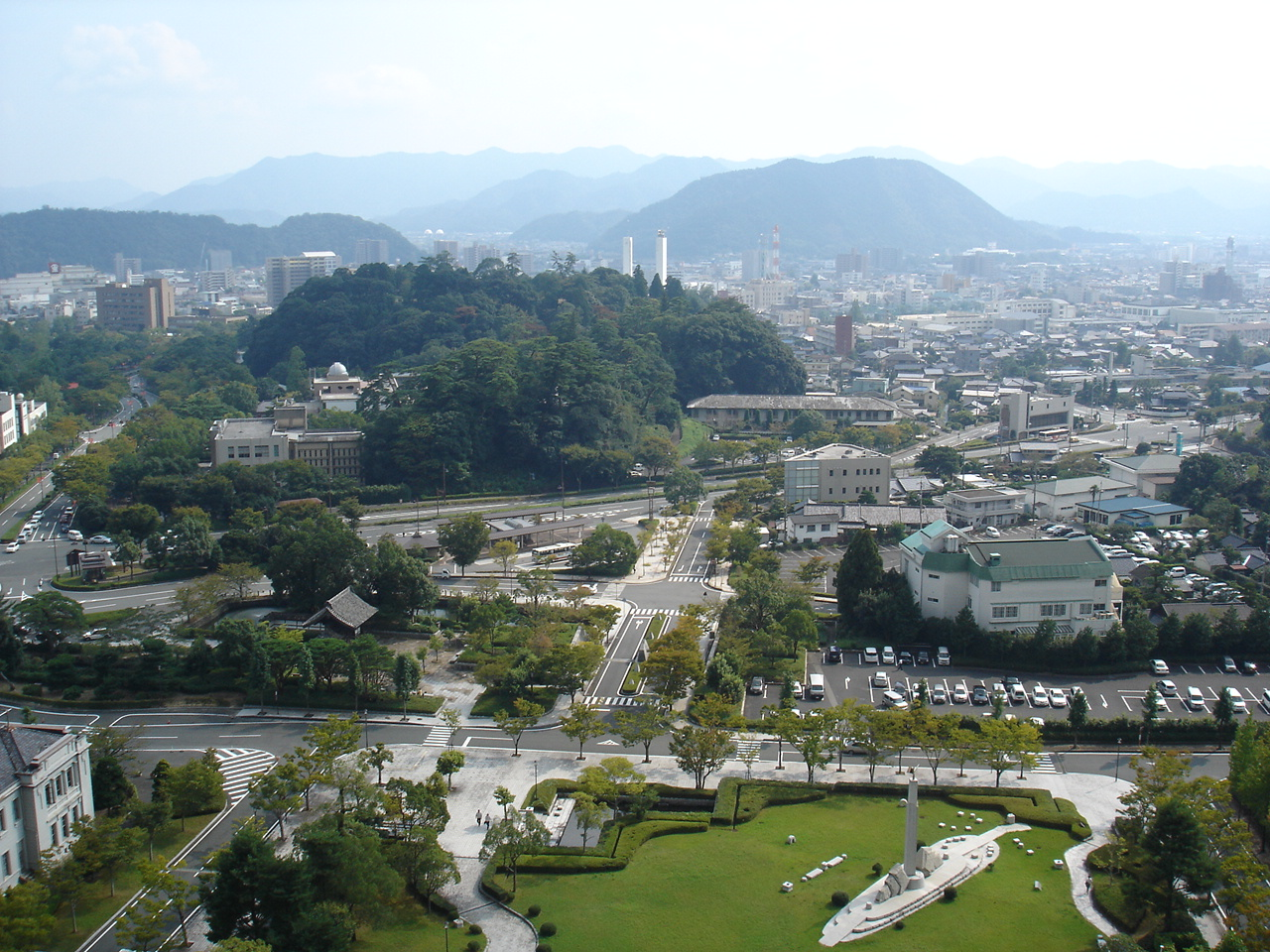
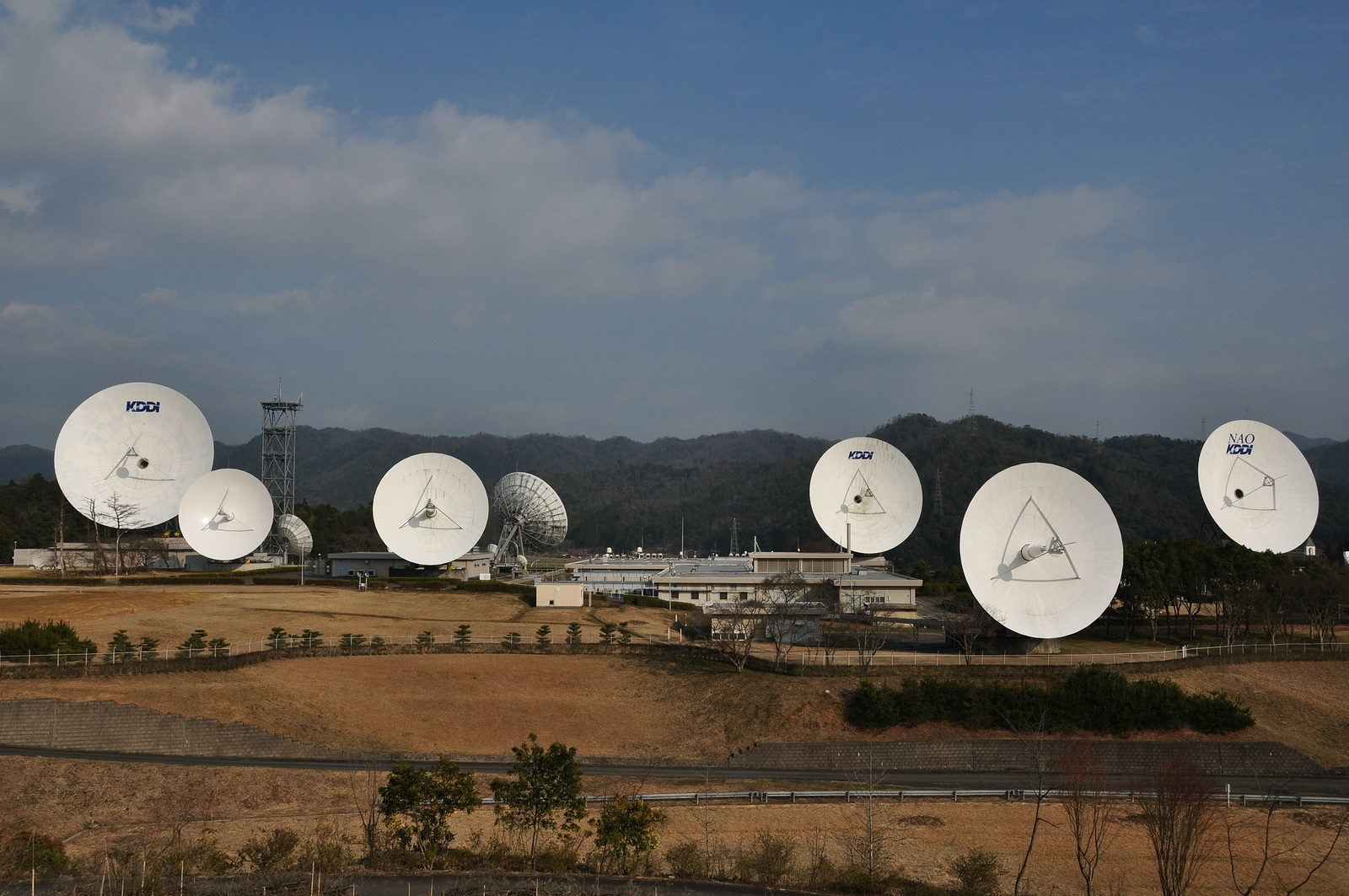
- Yamaguchi Xavier Memorial Church Yamaguchi Prefectural Government Museum Rurikō-ji five-story pagoda View of Yamaguchi Yamaguchi Satellite Earth Station

- Flag Emblem
- Interactive map outlining Yamaguchi
- Location of Yamaguchi in Yamaguchi Prefecture

- Location in Japan
- Coordinates: 34°10′41″N 131°28′26″E
- Country: Japan
- Region: Chūgoku (San'yō)
- Prefecture: Yamaguchi

Government
  - Mayor: Kazuki Ito

Area
  - Total: 1,023.23 km^{2} (395.07 sq mi)

Population (July 1, 2023)
  - Total: 191,470
  - Density: 187.12/km^{2} (484.65/sq mi)
- Time zone: UTC+09:00 (JST)
- City hall address: 2-1 Kameyama-cho, Yamaguchi-shi, Yamaguchi-ken 753-8650
- Climate: Cfa
- Website: Official website
- Symbols
- Flower: Rapeseed flowers, Sakura
- Tree: Ginkgo

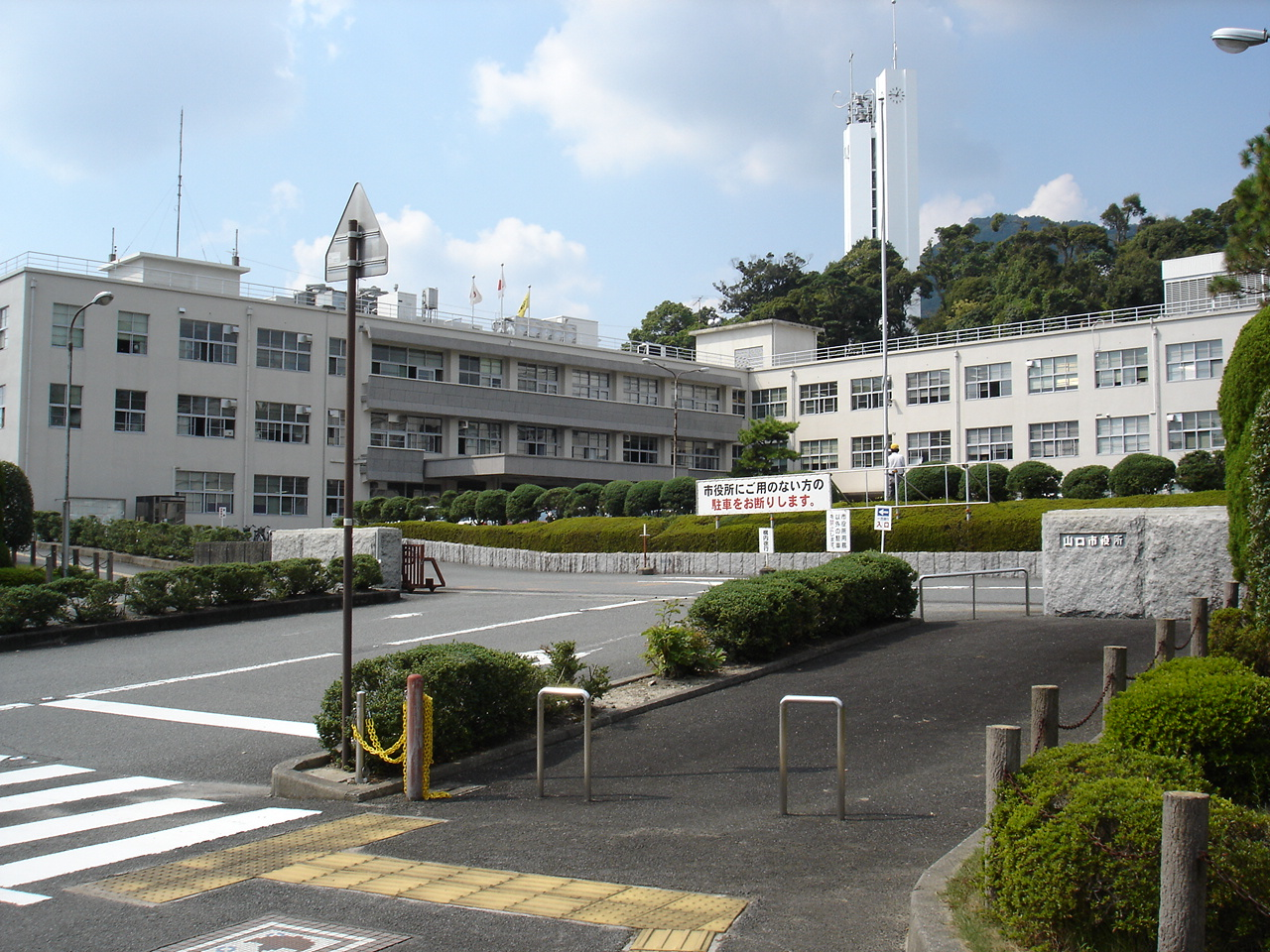
Yamaguchi City Hall

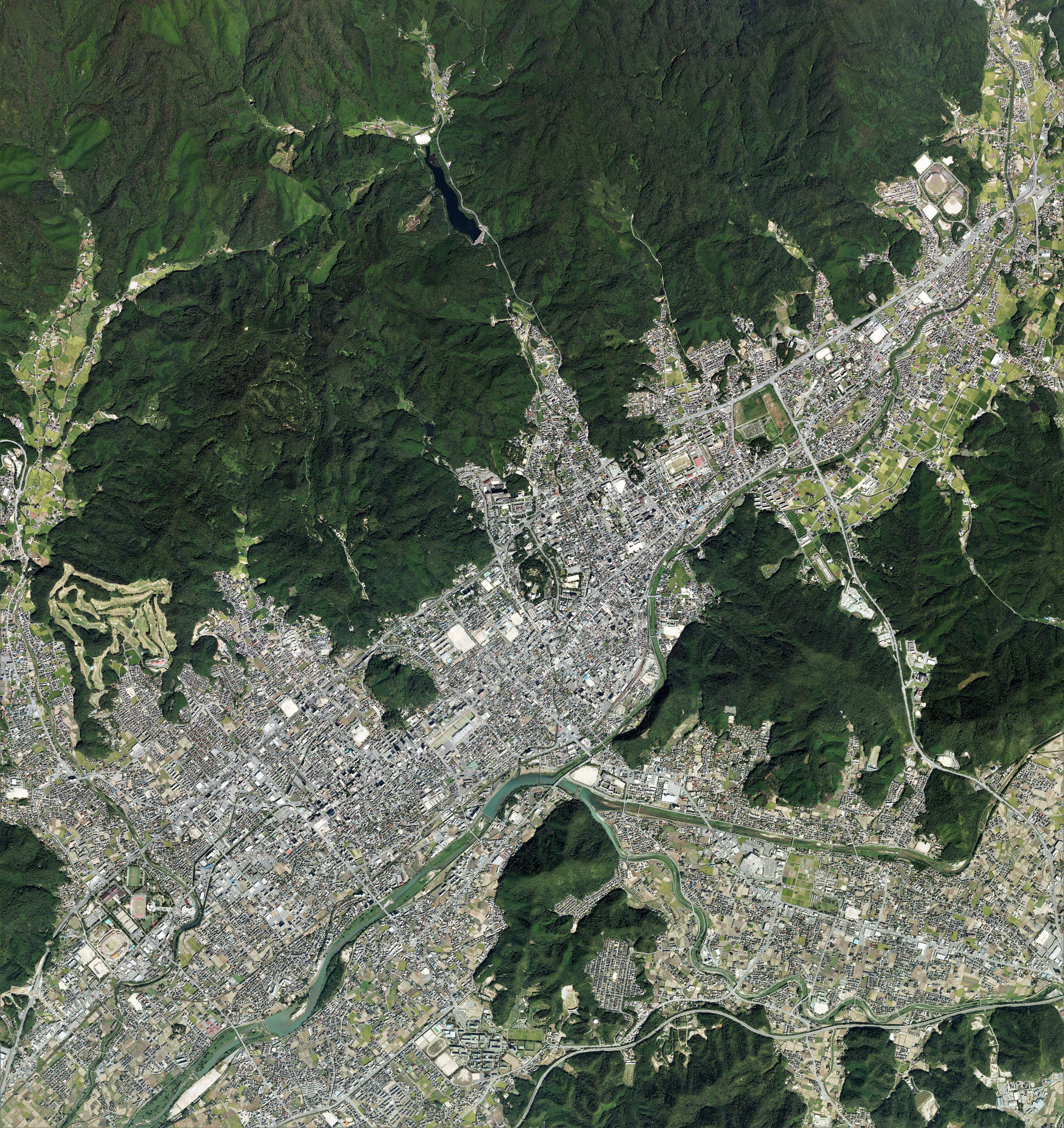
Aerial photograph of central Yamaguchi

Yamaguchi (山口市, Yamaguchi-shi (Note: Japanese pronunciation: [jä̀.mä́.ɡɯ̈̀.c̟͡ɕì, -ŋɯ̈̀.c̟͡ɕì, -ɡɯ̈́.c̟͡ɕi̥.ɕì, -ŋɯ̈́.c̟͡ɕi̥-])) is the capital city of Yamaguchi Prefecture, Japan. As of 1 July 2023, the city had an estimated population of 191,470 in 88,799 households and a population density of 190 persons per km^{2}. The total area of the city is 1,023.23 square kilometres (395.07 sq mi).

== Geography ==
Yamaguchi City is located almost in the center of Yamaguchi Prefecture. The city area, which is the largest in the prefecture, is long from north to south, facing the Seto Inland Sea (Yamaguchi Bay) at the south end, and bordering Shimane Prefecture at the north end. The Fushino River runs through the center of the Yamaguchi Basin from north to south, and urban areas are formed on both sides of the river.

=== Neighbouring municipalities ===
Shimane Prefecture

- Tsuwano
- Yoshika

Yamaguchi Prefecture

- Hagi
- Hōfu
- Mine
- Shūnan
- Ube

=== Climate ===
Yamaguchi has a humid subtropical climate (Köppen climate classification Cfa) with hot summers and cool winters. Precipitation is significant throughout the year, but is much higher in summer than in winter.

Climate data for Yamaguchi (1991−2020 normals, extremes 1966−present)
Month	Jan	Feb	Mar	Apr	May	Jun	Jul	Aug	Sep	Oct	Nov	Dec	Year
Record high °C (°F)	19.5 (67.1)	22.5 (72.5)	27.3 (81.1)	30.1 (86.2)	33.8 (92.8)	35.6 (96.1)	38.8 (101.8)	39.4 (102.9)	36.9 (98.4)	31.9 (89.4)	28.1 (82.6)	23.3 (73.9)	39.4 (102.9)
Mean maximum °C (°F)	15.0 (59.0)	17.5 (63.5)	21.5 (70.7)	27.0 (80.6)	30.6 (87.1)	32.1 (89.8)	35.6 (96.1)	36.0 (96.8)	33.4 (92.1)	28.7 (83.7)	23.3 (73.9)	17.4 (63.3)	36.4 (97.5)
Mean daily maximum °C (°F)	9.4 (48.9)	11.1 (52.0)	15.0 (59.0)	20.1 (68.2)	24.9 (76.8)	27.8 (82.0)	31.3 (88.3)	32.7 (90.9)	28.9 (84.0)	23.7 (74.7)	17.6 (63.7)	11.6 (52.9)	21.2 (70.2)
Daily mean °C (°F)	4.4 (39.9)	5.5 (41.9)	9.0 (48.2)	13.9 (57.0)	19.0 (66.2)	22.6 (72.7)	26.4 (79.5)	27.4 (81.3)	23.5 (74.3)	17.7 (63.9)	11.9 (53.4)	6.4 (43.5)	15.6 (60.1)
Mean daily minimum °C (°F)	0.4 (32.7)	0.8 (33.4)	3.6 (38.5)	8.1 (46.6)	13.3 (55.9)	18.4 (65.1)	22.7 (72.9)	23.4 (74.1)	19.4 (66.9)	12.9 (55.2)	7.0 (44.6)	2.0 (35.6)	11.0 (51.8)
Mean minimum °C (°F)	−3.5 (25.7)	−3.3 (26.1)	−1.7 (28.9)	1.6 (34.9)	7.5 (45.5)	13.6 (56.5)	18.9 (66.0)	19.6 (67.3)	13.7 (56.7)	6.7 (44.1)	1.2 (34.2)	−1.9 (28.6)	−4.2 (24.4)
Record low °C (°F)	−7.6 (18.3)	−8.9 (16.0)	−7.6 (18.3)	−1.2 (29.8)	3.2 (37.8)	8.0 (46.4)	13.1 (55.6)	14.9 (58.8)	7.4 (45.3)	1.3 (34.3)	−2.5 (27.5)	−5.5 (22.1)	−8.9 (16.0)
Average precipitation mm (inches)	76.3 (3.00)	85.0 (3.35)	145.6 (5.73)	168.1 (6.62)	197.2 (7.76)	282.9 (11.14)	342.6 (13.49)	205.8 (8.10)	179.1 (7.05)	91.3 (3.59)	83.5 (3.29)	70.5 (2.78)	1,927.7 (75.89)
Average snowfall cm (inches)	11 (4.3)	9 (3.5)	2 (0.8)	0 (0)	0 (0)	0 (0)	0 (0)	0 (0)	0 (0)	0 (0)	0 (0)	3 (1.2)	26 (10)
Average precipitation days (≥ 0.5 mm)	12.2	11.5	12.4	10.6	10.1	12.8	12.3	10.7	10.2	7.5	8.9	11.4	130.7
Average relative humidity (%)	76	71	70	69	67	75	78	75	74	73	76	78	74
Mean monthly sunshine hours	117.9	121.3	157.4	183.9	204.3	142.3	156.2	196.2	151.7	169.4	144.0	117.6	1,862
Source: Japan Meteorological Agency

Climate data for Tokusa, Yamaguchi (1991−2020 normals, extremes 1977−present)
Month	Jan	Feb	Mar	Apr	May	Jun	Jul	Aug	Sep	Oct	Nov	Dec	Year
Record high °C (°F)	16.8 (62.2)	20.1 (68.2)	25.8 (78.4)	28.9 (84.0)	32.2 (90.0)	34.2 (93.6)	36.4 (97.5)	36.6 (97.9)	35.1 (95.2)	30.7 (87.3)	25.5 (77.9)	21.8 (71.2)	36.6 (97.9)
Mean daily maximum °C (°F)	6.4 (43.5)	7.9 (46.2)	12.2 (54.0)	18.1 (64.6)	23.0 (73.4)	25.7 (78.3)	29.1 (84.4)	30.4 (86.7)	26.3 (79.3)	21.0 (69.8)	15.2 (59.4)	9.0 (48.2)	18.7 (65.6)
Daily mean °C (°F)	1.8 (35.2)	2.8 (37.0)	6.3 (43.3)	11.7 (53.1)	16.8 (62.2)	20.5 (68.9)	24.4 (75.9)	25.1 (77.2)	20.9 (69.6)	14.8 (58.6)	9.2 (48.6)	3.9 (39.0)	13.2 (55.7)
Mean daily minimum °C (°F)	−2.1 (28.2)	−1.9 (28.6)	0.8 (33.4)	5.6 (42.1)	11.0 (51.8)	16.3 (61.3)	20.8 (69.4)	21.2 (70.2)	16.7 (62.1)	9.6 (49.3)	3.9 (39.0)	−0.4 (31.3)	8.5 (47.2)
Record low °C (°F)	−12.9 (8.8)	−16.0 (3.2)	−9.5 (14.9)	−4.1 (24.6)	0.7 (33.3)	4.6 (40.3)	12.2 (54.0)	13.1 (55.6)	3.9 (39.0)	−1.5 (29.3)	−4.4 (24.1)	−10.4 (13.3)	−16.0 (3.2)
Average precipitation mm (inches)	121.9 (4.80)	106.3 (4.19)	146.7 (5.78)	136.6 (5.38)	153.7 (6.05)	229.5 (9.04)	337.8 (13.30)	201.5 (7.93)	208.6 (8.21)	116.7 (4.59)	97.4 (3.83)	116.3 (4.58)	1,973 (77.68)
Average precipitation days (≥ 1.0 mm)	15.8	13.5	13.7	11.0	10.0	12.6	13.1	10.9	11.6	9.2	10.7	14.1	146.2
Mean monthly sunshine hours	66.5	86.6	133.7	172.5	193.0	127.0	136.0	171.3	129.6	150.5	112.3	74.8	1,553.5
Source: Japan Meteorological Agency

=== Demographics ===
Per Japanese census data, the population of Yamaguchi in 2020 is 193,966 people. Yamaguchi has been conducting censuses since 1960.

Historical population
Year	Pop.	±%
1960	172,116	—
1965	162,219	−5.8%
1970	160,347	−1.2%
1975	164,470	+2.6%
1980	173,590	+5.5%
1985	183,149	+5.5%
1990	187,793	+2.5%
1995	193,172	+2.9%
2000	197,115	+2.0%
2005	199,297	+1.1%
2010	196,643	−1.3%
2015	197,422	+0.4%
2020	193,966	−1.8%
Yamaguchi population statistics

== History ==
The area of Yamaguchi was part of the ancient Suō Province. During the Muromachi period it was ruled by the Ōuchi clan, who at their height ruled over six provinces in the Chugoku region of western Japan. The Ōuchi clan claimed descent from the royal house of Baekje and grew wealthy due to extensive trade with Korea and Ming Dynasty China. After the Onin War, they welcomed intellectuals who escaped from Kyoto, such that Yamaguchi prospered as a center of culture. Later in the Muromachi period, Christian missionaries from Spain and Portugal were welcomed, and the area became an early center for the Kirishitan faith. The Ōuchi were eventually overthrown by their vassals, the Mōri clan, who ruled the area as part of Chōshū Domain during the Edo Period.

Following the Meiji Restoration, the town of Yamaguchi was established within Yoshiki District, Yamaguchi with the creation of the modern municipalities system on April 1, 1889. On April 1, 1905 Yamaguchi annexed the village of Kami-unorei, followed by Shimo-unorei on July 1, 1915. On April 10, 1929: The town of Yamaguchi absorbed the village of Yoshiki to create the city of Yamaguchi. Yamaguchi annexed the village of Miyano on April 1, 1941. On April 1, 1944, Yamaguchi annexed towns of Ogōri and Ajisu, and the villages of Hirakawa, Ōtoshi, Sue, Natajima, Aiofutajima, Kagawa and Sayama (all from Yoshiki District.)

The town of Ajisu separated from Yamaguchi on November 23, 1947, followed by the town of Ogōri on November 1, 1949. Yamaguchi annexed the town of Ōuchi on May 1, 1963 and the village of Suzenji on November 3, 1963. On October 1, 2005 Yamaguchi merged with town of Tokuji (from Saba District), and the towns of Aio, Ajisu and Ogōri (all from Yoshiki District);. Yoshiki District was dissolved as a result of this merger. On January 16, 2010 Yamaguchi absorbed the town of Atō (from Abu District).

== Government ==
Yamaguchi has a mayor-council form of government with a directly elected mayor and a unicameral city council of 35 members. Yamaguchi contributes six members to the Yamaguchi Prefectural Assembly. In terms of national politics, the city is divided between the Yamaguchi 1st district and the Yamaguchi 3rd district in lower house of the Diet of Japan.

== Economy ==
Although Yamaguchi City is the prefectural capital, excluding public facilities and public works, the other major industries are commerce and the tourism and distribution industries. Despite having the second largest population in the prefecture after Shimonoseki, which is a constituent city of the Kanmon metropolitan area, and the third largest gross city product in the prefecture after Shūnan and Shimonoseki, the city has a very small industrial base.

== Education ==
=== Colleges and universities ===
- Yamaguchi College of Arts
- Yamaguchi Gakugei College
- Yamaguchi Prefectural University
- Yamaguchi University

=== Primary and secondary education ===
Yamaguchi has 32 public elementary schools, 17 public junior high schools operated by the city government, and six public high schools operated by the Yamaguchi Prefectural Board of Education. There are also one elementary school and one junior high school operated by Yamaguchi University Faculty of Education, and three private high schools. The prefecture operates two special education schools for the handicapped, and there is one special education school operated by Yamaguchi University Faculty of Education.

== Transportation ==
=== Railway ===
JR West (JR West) - San'yō Shinkansen

- Shin-Yamaguchi

JR West (JR West) - San'yō Main Line

- Yotsutsuji - Shin-Yamaguchi - Kagawa - Hon-Yura

JR West (JR West) - Yamaguchi Line

- Shin-Yamaguchi - Suō-Shimogō - Kamigō - Nihozu - Ōtoshi - Yabara - Yudaonsen - Yamaguchi - Kami-Yamaguchi - Miyano - Niho - Shinome - Chōmonkyō - Watarigawa - Mitani - Nagusa - Jifuku - Nabekura - Tokusa - Funahirayama

JR West (JR West) - Ube Line

- Shin-Yamaguchi - Kami-Kagawa - Fukamizo - Suō-Sayama - Iwakura - Ajisu

=== Highways ===
- San'yō Expressway
- Chūgoku Expressway
- Yamaguchi-Ube Road
- National Route 2
- National Route 9
- National Route 190
- National Route 262
- National Route 315
- National Route 376
- National Route 435
- National Route 489

== Media ==
=== Newspaper ===
- Yamaguchi Shimbun

=== TV ===
- KRY TV (NNN)
- NHK TV
- TYS TV (JNN)
- YAB TV (ANN)

== Twin towns – sister cities ==
Yamaguchi is twinned with:

- Changwon, South Korea
- Gongju, South Korea
- Jinan, China
- Pamplona, Spain

== Local attractions ==
- Chūya Nakahara Memorial Museum
- Jōei-ji, Buddhist temple with a garden that is a National Historic Site and National Place of Scenic Beauty
- Kōnomine Castle - A castle ruin, one of the Continued Top 100 Japanese Castles.
- Ōuchi-shi Yakata - A castle ruin, one of the Continued Top 100 Japanese Castles
- Rurikō-ji, Buddhist temple with a national treasure five-story pagoda
- Yamaguchi Prefectural Museum of Art
- Yamaguchi Center for Arts and Media
- Yamaguchi Xavier Memorial Church
- Yuda Onsen

== Notable people from Yamaguchi City ==
- Yoshisuke Aikawa, founder of Nissan
- Daiki Kamikawa, Olympic gold medalist judoka
- Inoue Kaoru, politician, entrepreneur
- Terauchi Masatake, Prime Minister of Japan
- Chuya Nakahara, poet
- Kishi Nobusuke, Prime Minister of Japan
- Shohei Ono, Olympic gold medalist judoka
- Raizō Tanaka, admiral in the Imperial Japanese Navy
