= Suō-Sayama Station =

Railway station in Yamaguchi, Yamaguchi Prefecture, Japan

Suō-Sayama Station 周防佐山駅
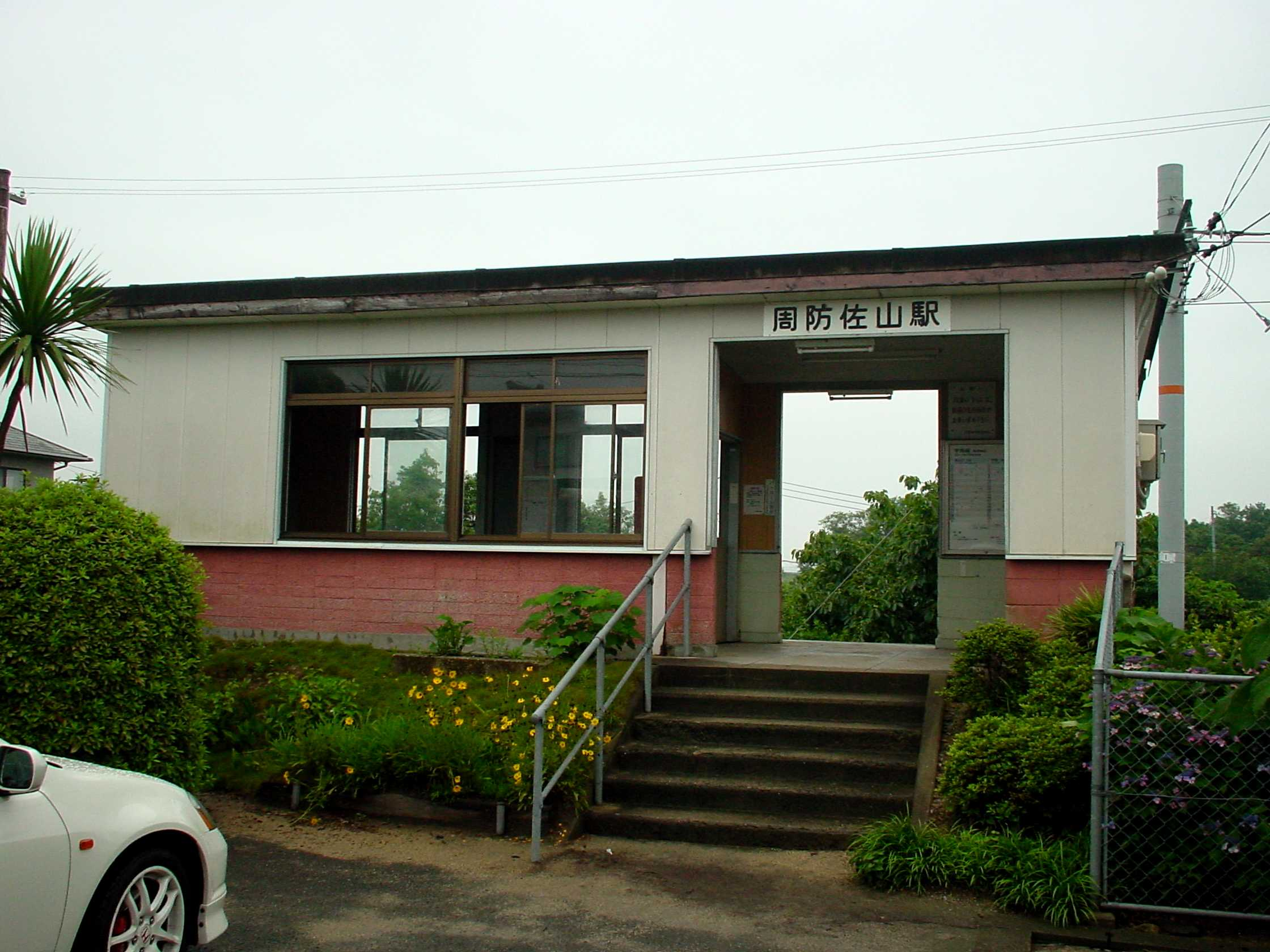
- Suō-Sayama Station in July 2006

General information
- Location: 1094 Kawachijingo, Sayama, Yamaguchi-shi, Yamaguchi-ken 754-0894; Japan
- Coordinates: 34°2′5.66″N 131°21′49.21″E
- Owner: West Japan Railway Company
- Operator: West Japan Railway Company
- Line: Ube Line
- Distance: 7.5 km (4.7 miles) from Shin-Yamaguchi
- Platforms: 1 side platform
- Tracks: 1
- Connections: Bus stop

Other information
- Status: Unstaffed
- Website: Official website

History
- Opened: 26 March 1925; 101 years ago

Passengers
- FY2020: 46

Services
| Preceding station | JR West | Following station |
|---|---|---|
| Fukamizo towards Shin-Yamaguchi | Ube Line Local | Iwakura towards Ube |
Location
- Location within Yamaguchi Prefecture Location within Japan

Suō-Sayama Station (周防佐山駅, Suō-Sayama-eki) is a passenger railway station located in the city of Yamaguchi, Yamaguchi Prefecture, Japan. It is operated by the West Japan Railway Company (JR West).

== Lines ==
Suō-Sayama Station is served by the JR West Ube Line, and is located 7.5 kilometers from the terminus of the line at Shin-Yamaguchi.

== Station layout ==
The station consists of one ground-level side platform serving a single bi-directional track. The station is unattended.

== History ==
Suō-Sayama Station was opened on 26 March 1925 when the Ube Railway was extended from Ogōri Station (present-day Shin-Yamaguchi) to Hon-Ajisu Station (present-day Ajisu Station). The line was nationalized in 1943, becoming the Ube Higashi Line, and was renamed the Ube Line on 1 February 1948. With the privatization of the Japan National Railway (JNR) on 1 April 1987, the station came under the aegis of the West Japan railway Company (JR West).

== Passenger statistics ==
In fiscal 2020, the station was used by an average of 46 passengers daily.

== Surrounding area ==
- Yamaguchi Municipal Sayama Elementary School
- Japan National Route 190

== See also ==
- List of railway stations in Japan
