= Yamaguchi Gakugei College =

University in Yamaguchi, Japan

Coordinates: 34°07′15″N 131°24′08″E

Yamaguchi Gakugei College (山口学芸大学, Yamaguchi gakugei daigaku) is a private university in Yamaguchi, Yamaguchi, Japan.
