= Yamaguchi Center for Arts and Media =

- 山口情報芸術センター

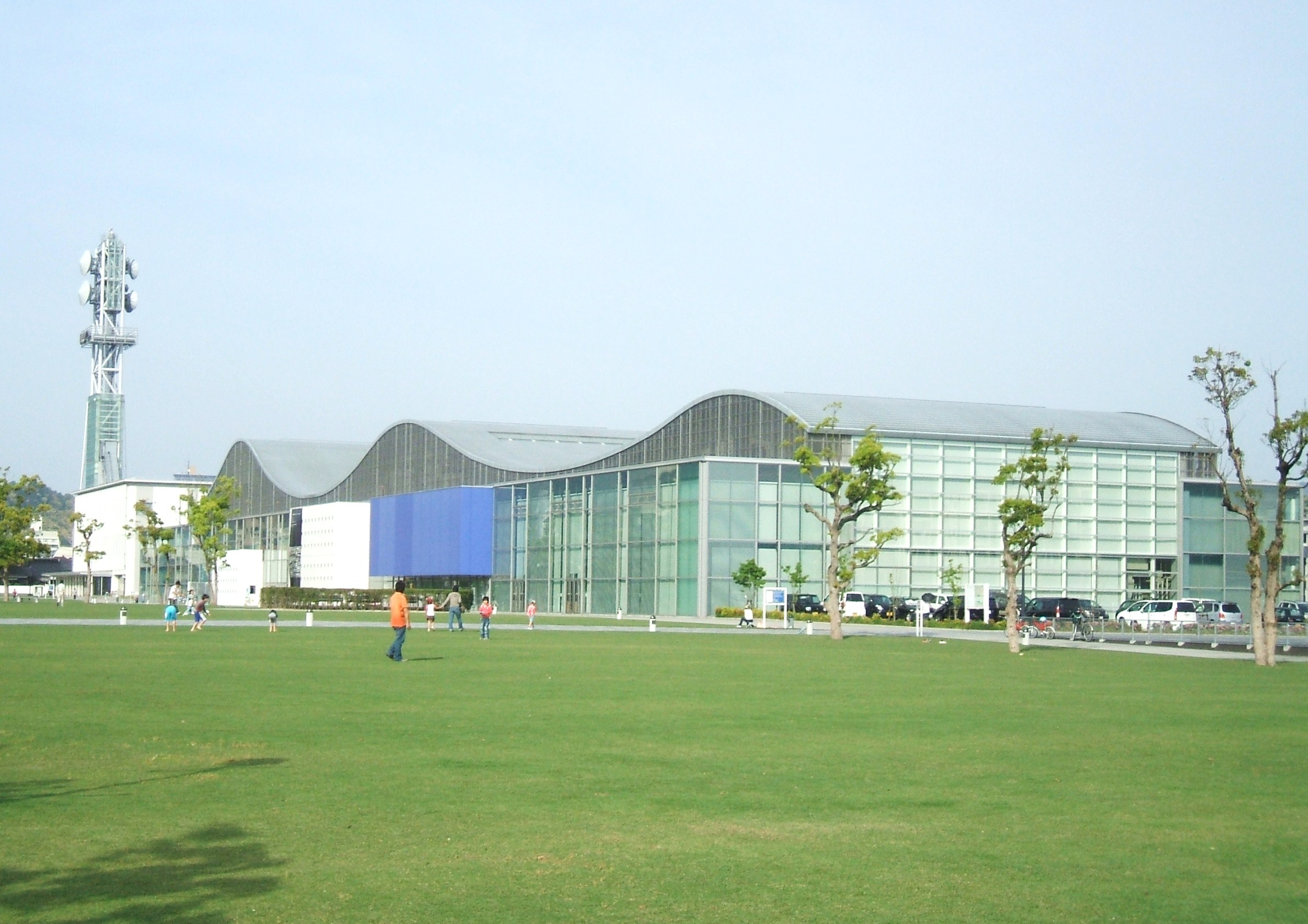
- YCAM view from Yamaguchi Central Park

- Location within Japan
- Established: November 1, 2003
- Location: Yamaguchi (city), Yamaguchi Prefecture, Japan
- Coordinates: 34.169611°N 131.467278°E
- Type: Art center
- Visitors: 445,311 (2024)
- Architect: Arata Isozaki
- Parking: On site (no charge)
- Website: www.ycam.jp

The Yamaguchi Center for Arts and Media (山口情報芸術センター, Yamaguchi Jouhou Geijutsu Sentaa), (YCAM) is an art center located in Yamaguchi, Yamaguchi Prefecture, Japan. The structure was designed by the Arata Isozaki and opened in 2003. The building hosts a museum for contemporary art operated by the Yamaguchi City Foundation for Cultural Promotion, as well as the Yamaguchi City Central Library.

As an arts center, YCAM does not hold an art collection, but constantly produces new exhibitions of media art works, theatre and dance performances, movie screenings, concerts, lectures, conferences, and workshops.

== History ==
In June 1989 Yamaguchi city government decided in its fourth "Yamaguchi City Comprehensive Plan" to develop the location of the former Yamaguchi Prefectural Gymnasium and Yamaguchi Prefectural Chuo High School into a "Cultural Exchange Plaza(tentative title)", including the Yamaguchi City Central Park, a library and an arts center. The museum opened in November 2003 and attracted more than 7.000.000 visitors in the first ten years.

== Architecture ==
After the basic plans for the area were finished in early 1996, an agreement with Arata Isozaki Atelier was made in November 1996. Construction started in August 2001, and finished in April 2003. The two floored building itself is 170m long, 50m wide and 20m tall. Its wavelike roof design is inspired by the ridgelines of the surrounding mountains. The interior is arranged laterally by function and include a theater, gallery, cinema, and library space.

== Art Production ==
Unlike museums with a permanent collection, YCAM focusses on the production and exhibition of original works incorporating media technology. The educational department produces original workshops that introduce visitors to media technology and artistic expression incorporating technology. As example, the ”Korogaru Koen Park” learning program for children, that has been implemented in Yamaguchi City, Tokyo, and other places across Japan.

The YCAM InterLab team produces original works and educational programs, researches possible applications of media technology, and publicates the results of its research and development projects. In its long-term programs it actively collaborates with local citizens and experts as co-researchers and artistic co-producers.

== Facilities ==
- Yamaguchi City Central Library
- Studio A: Multi-purpose hall for exhibitions, performances, concerts, and lectures.
- Studio B: Exhibition hall, also used for performances.
- Studio C: Cinema 100 seats.
- BioLab and workshops

== Location ==
YCAM is on the southern side of Yamaguchi City Central Park (山口市中央公園, Yamaguchi-Shi Chu Koen) in Nakazono-Chou district, next to the NHK Yamaguchi Broadcasting Station, Yamaguchi Cable TV, and close to Yamaguchi General Hospital.

=== Access ===
YCAM is about 20 Minutes walk from both Yamaguchi Station and Yuda Onsen Station on the Yamaguchi Line. It is also accessible by bus from Yamaguchi Station and Shin-Yamaguchi Station. Free parking for 161 cars is available on site.

== Awards ==
The multi-purpose hall "Studio A" has been selected for the "Top 100 Excellent Halls" by the Sound Engineers and Artists Society of Japan in 2008, and is the only featured venue in Chugoku and Shikoku regions.

In 2014 the YCAM-produced park style playground “Korogaru Koen Park” won the Kids Design Association's Kids Design Award and the Japan Institute of Design Promotion's Good Design Award.
