= Yamaguchi Prefectural University =

University in Yamaguchi, Japan

Coordinates: 34°11′38″N 131°29′54″E

- 山口県立大学
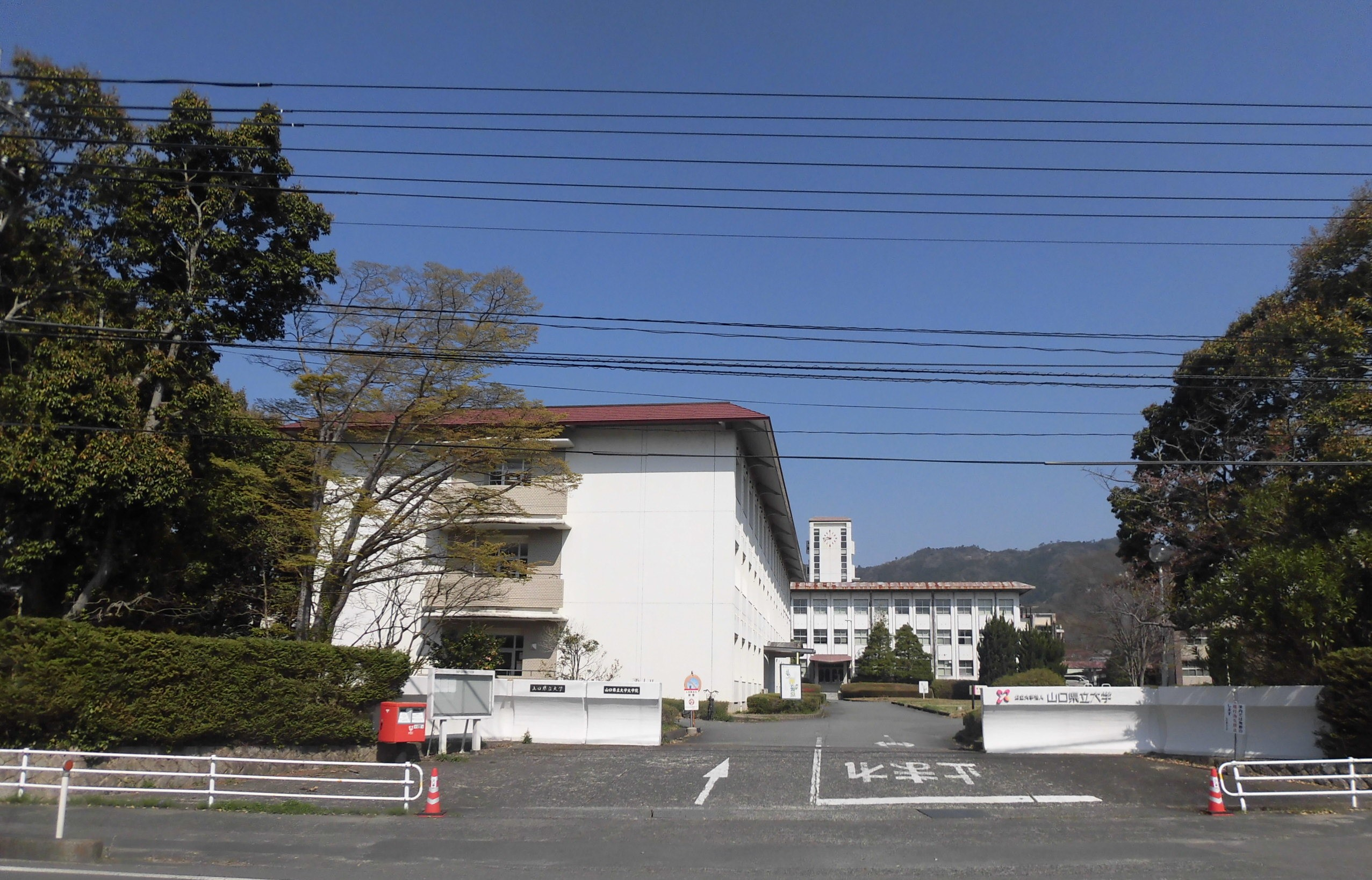
- Motto: 大地共創 Daichi-Kyōsō
- Type: Public
- Established: 1941
- President: Makiko Tanaka
- Location: Yamaguchi City, Yamaguchi, Japan
- Website: https://www.yamaguchi-pu.ac.jp/en/

Yamaguchi Prefectural University (山口県立大学, Yamaguchi kenritsu daigaku) is a public university in Yamaguchi, Yamaguchi, Japan. Its predecessor was founded in 1941, and it was chartered as a university in 1975. In 1996 it became a coeducational institution.

== Faculty & Department ==
- Faculty of Intercultural Studies
  - InterCultural Studies
  - Culture and Creative Arts
- Faculty of Social Welfare
- Faculty of Nursing and Human Nutrition
  - Nursing
  - Human Nutrition
- Graduate School of Intercultural Studies
- Graduate School of Health and Welfare
- Division of Midwifery
