= Yamaguchi Line =

Railway line in western Japan

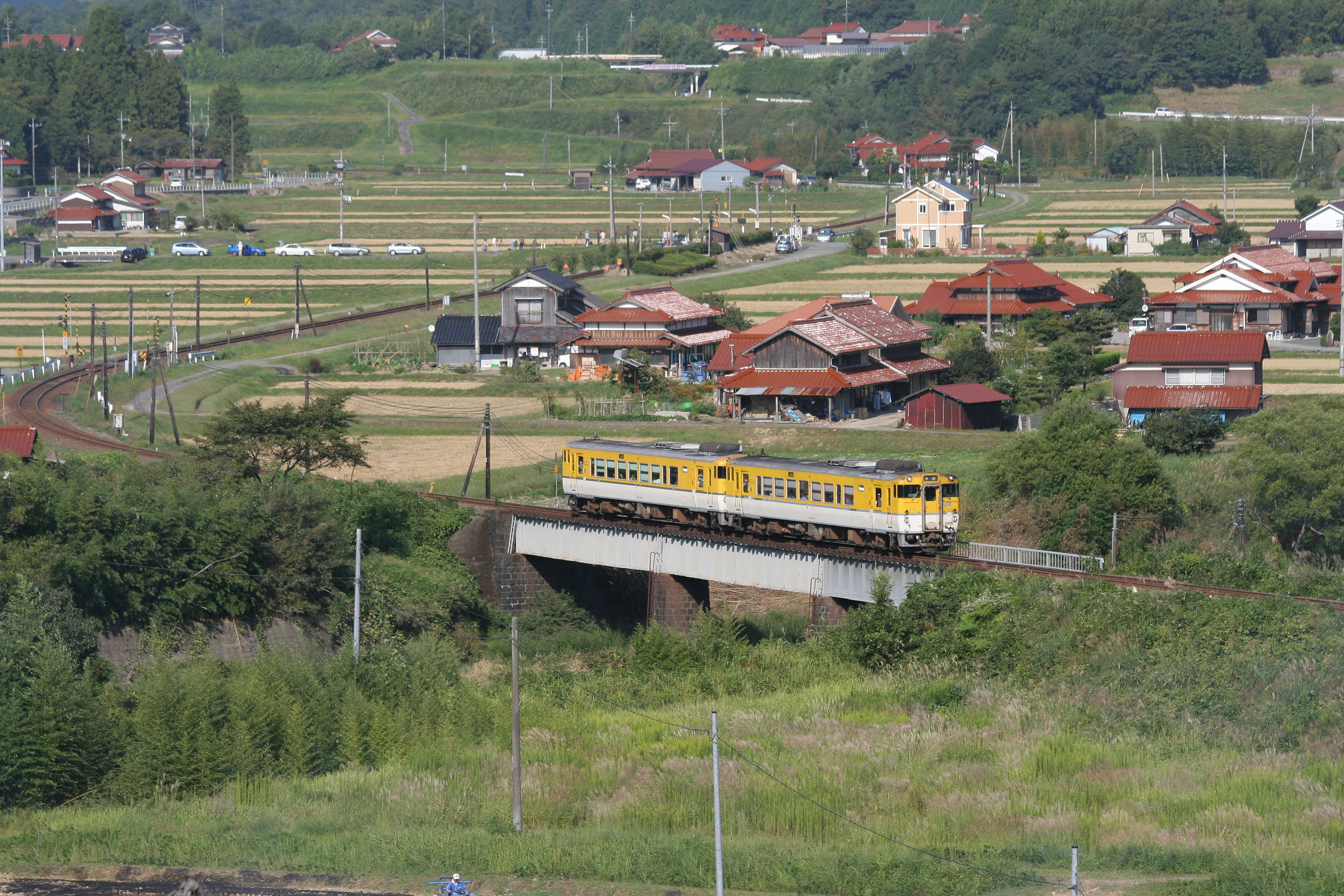
- An all-stations "Local" service formed of two KiHa 40 series DMU cars in September 2009

Overview
- Native name: 山口線
- Status: In operation
- Owner: JR West
- Locale: Yamaguchi Prefecture, Shimane Prefecture
- Termini: Shin-Yamaguchi; Masuda
- Stations: 28

Service
- Type: Regional rail
- Operator(s): JR West, JR Freight
- Rolling stock: KiHa 40 series, KiHa 120 series, KiHa 187 series DMU, D51 200 steam locomotive, 35 series passenger cars

History
- Opened: 20 February 1913

Technical
- Line length: 93.9 km (58.3 mi)
- Num of tracks: Entire line single tracked
- Character: Rural
- Track gauge: 1,067 mm (3 ft 6 in)
- Electrification: None
- Operating speed: 85 km/h (53 mph)

The Yamaguchi Line (山口線, Yamaguchi-sen) is a railway line in western Japan operated by West Japan Railway Company (JR West). The line connects Shin-Yamaguchi Station in Yamaguchi, Yamaguchi and Masuda Station in Masuda, Shimane.

== History ==
The Ogori (now Shin-Yamaguchi) - Yamaguchi section opened in 1913, and the line was progressively extended north, reaching Masuda in 1923.

CTC signalling was commissioned in 1984.

=== Proposed connecting line ===
- Nichihara Station: The Gannichi Line was proposed to be extended to this station, and construction commenced in 1967. About 50% of the roadbed had been completed when construction was abandoned in 1980.

== Services ==
The Super Oki limited express connects Shin-Yamaguchi Station with Yonago Station and Tottori Station on the Sanin Main Line via the Yamaguchi Line.

The line is also famous for the operation of the rapid SL Yamaguchi steam train.

== Stations ==
●：Train stops
｜：Train passes

- "Local" trains stop at every station.

Station	Japanese	Distance (km)	Rapid Commuter Liner	Super Oki	Transfers	Location	
Shin-Yamaguchi	新山口	0.0	●	●	Sanyō Shinkansen; Sanyō Main Line; Ube Line	Yamaguchi	Yamaguchi Prefecture
Suō-Shimogō	周防下郷	1.0	｜	｜		Yamaguchi	Yamaguchi Prefecture
Kamigō	上郷	2.7	｜	｜		Yamaguchi	Yamaguchi Prefecture
Nihozu	仁保津	4.6	｜	｜		Yamaguchi	Yamaguchi Prefecture
Ōtoshi	大歳	7.3	●	｜		Yamaguchi	Yamaguchi Prefecture
Yabara	矢原	8.6	●	｜		Yamaguchi	Yamaguchi Prefecture
Yudaonsen	湯田温泉	10.3	●	●		Yamaguchi	Yamaguchi Prefecture
Yamaguchi	山口	12.7	●	●		Yamaguchi	Yamaguchi Prefecture
Kami-Yamaguchi	上山口	13.9		｜		Yamaguchi	Yamaguchi Prefecture
Miyano	宮野	15.5		｜		Yamaguchi	Yamaguchi Prefecture
Niho	仁保	20.2		｜		Yamaguchi	Yamaguchi Prefecture
Shinome	篠目	28.9		｜		Yamaguchi	Yamaguchi Prefecture
Chōmonkyō	長門峡	32.3		｜		Yamaguchi	Yamaguchi Prefecture
Watarigawa	渡川	35.5		｜		Yamaguchi	Yamaguchi Prefecture
Mitani	三谷	38.6		●		Yamaguchi	Yamaguchi Prefecture
Nagusa	名草	41.4		｜		Yamaguchi	Yamaguchi Prefecture
Jifuku	地福	43.9		｜		Yamaguchi	Yamaguchi Prefecture
Nabekura	鍋倉	46.4		｜		Yamaguchi	Yamaguchi Prefecture
Tokusa	徳佐	49.9		●		Yamaguchi	Yamaguchi Prefecture
Funahirayama	船平山	52.8		｜		Yamaguchi	Yamaguchi Prefecture
Tsuwano	津和野	62.9		●		Tsuwano, Kanoashi	Shimane Prefecture
Aonoyama	青野山	66.1		｜		Tsuwano, Kanoashi	Shimane Prefecture
Nichihara	日原	72.8		●		Tsuwano, Kanoashi	Shimane Prefecture
Aohara	青原	77.5		｜		Tsuwano, Kanoashi	Shimane Prefecture
Higashi-Aohara	東青原	80.6		｜		Tsuwano, Kanoashi	Shimane Prefecture
Iwami-Yokota	石見横田	84.7		｜		Masuda	Shimane Prefecture
Honmataga	本俣賀	89.6		｜		Masuda	Shimane Prefecture
Masuda	益田	93.9		●	Sanin Main Line	Masuda	Shimane Prefecture

== See also ==
- List of railway lines in Japan
