= Yamaguchi Station (Yamaguchi) =

Railway station in Yamaguchi, Yamaguchi Prefecture, Japan

Yamaguchi Station 山口駅
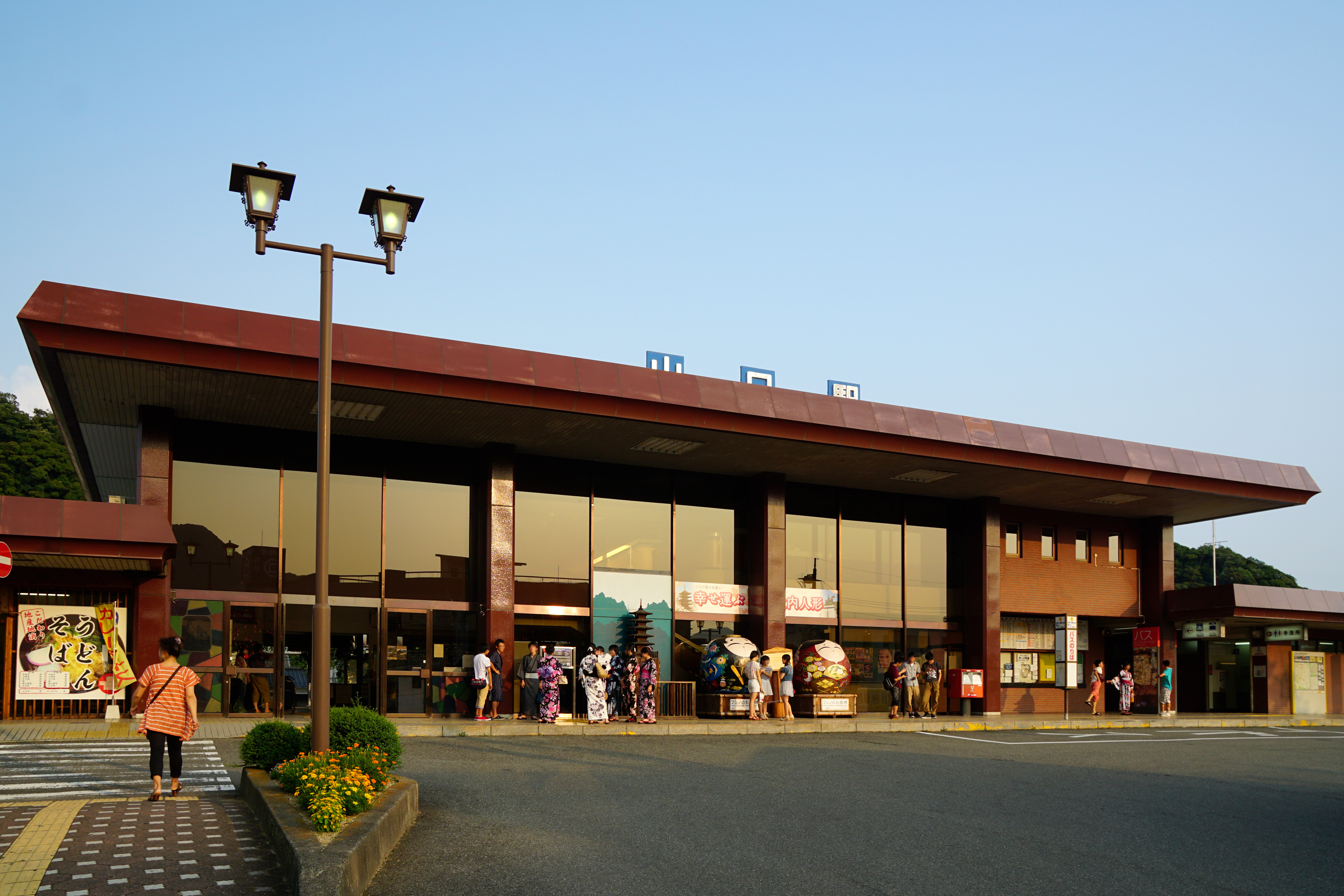
- Yamaguchi Station in July 2014

General information
- Location: 2-1-2, Sōdayū-chō, Yamaguchi-shi, Yamaguchi-ken 753-0042; Japan
- Coordinates: 34°10′21.5″N 131°28′50.5″E
- Owner: West Japan Railway Company
- Operator: West Japan Railway Company
- Line: Yamaguchi Line
- Distance: 12.7 km (7.9 miles) from Shin-Yamaguchi
- Platforms: 1 side + 1 island platform
- Tracks: 3
- Connections: Bus stop

Construction
- Accessible: yes

Other information
- Status: Staffed
- Website: Official website

History
- Opened: 20 February 1913; 113 years ago

Passengers
- FY2020: 1457

Services
| Preceding station | JR West | Following station |
|---|---|---|
| Yudaonsen towards Shin-Yamaguchi | Yamaguchi Line Local | Kami-Yamaguchi towards Masuda |
Location
- Location within Yamaguchi Prefecture Location within Japan

Yamaguchi Station (山口駅, Yamaguchi-eki) is a passenger railway station located in the city of Yamaguchi, Yamaguchi Prefecture, Japan. It is operated by the West Japan Railway Company (JR West).

== Lines ==
Yamaguchi Station is served by the JR West Yamaguchi Line, and is located 12.7 kilometers from the terminus of the line at Shin-Yamaguchi. The limited express Super Oki and the rapid sightseeing train SL Yamaguchi steam train also stop here.

== Station layout ==
The station consists of one side platform and one island platform connected by a footbridge. The station is staffed.

=== Platforms ===
| 1, 2, 3 | ■ Yamaguchi Line | for Shin-Yamaguchi for Tsuwano and Masuda |

== History ==
Yamaguchi Station was opened on 20 February 1913. With the privatization of the Japan National Railway (JNR) on 1 April 1987, the station came under the aegis of the West Japan railway Company (JR West).

== Passenger statistics ==
In fiscal 2020, the station was used by an average of 1457 passengers daily.

== Surrounding area ==
- Yamaguchi Prefectural Office
- Yamaguchi City Hall
- Yamaguchi Prefectural Museum of Art

== See also ==
- List of railway stations in Japan
