= Tsuwano Station =

Railway station in Tsuwano, Shimane Prefecture, Japan

Tsuwano Station 津和野駅
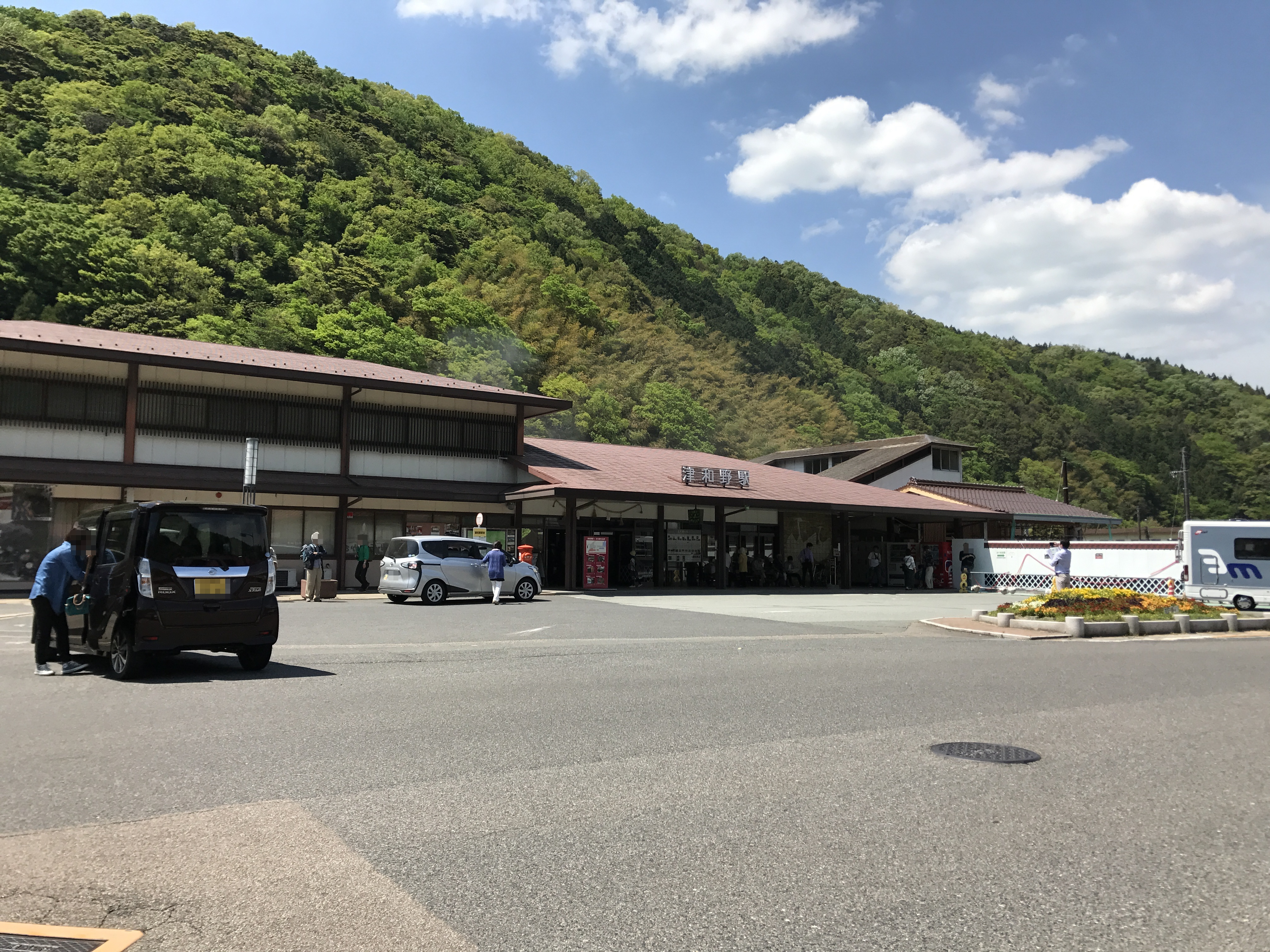
- Tsuwano Station Building, May 2017

General information
- Location: Ushiroda, Tsuwano-cho, Kanoashi-gun, Shimane-ken 6699-5605; Japan
- Coordinates: 34°28′21.37″N 131°46′25.76″E
- Owner: West Japan Railway Company
- Operator: West Japan Railway Company
- Line: Yamaguchi Line
- Distance: 62.0 km (38.5 miles) from Shin-Yamaguchi
- Platforms: 1 island platform
- Tracks: 2
- Connections: Bus stop

Other information
- Status: Staffed
- Website: Official website

History
- Opened: 5 May 1918; 108 years ago

Passengers
- FY2020: 140

Services
Preceding station	JR West	Following station
Funahirayama towards Shin-Yamaguchi	Yamaguchi Line Local	Aonoyama towards Masuda
Location
- Location within Shimane Prefecture Location within Japan

Tsuwano Station (津和野駅, Tsuwano-eki) is a passenger railway station located in the town of Tsuwano, Kanoashi District, Shimane Prefecture, Japan. It is operated by the West Japan Railway Company (JR West).

== Lines ==
Tsuwano Station is served by the JR West Yamaguchi Line, and is located 62.0 kilometers from the terminus of the line at Shin-Yamaguchi. Limited Express Super Oki stops here, and it is the terminal of sightseeing train SL Yamaguchi (steam train).

== Station layout ==
The station consists of one island platform connected to the station building by a footbridge. Platform 1 is a track adjacent to the station building, but it does not have boarding and alighting facilities and is used for train parking. "SL Yamaguchi" temporarily stores the passenger cars on this line, and then heads to the turntable to change the direction of the locomotive alone. The station is staffed. JNR Class D51 194 is on static display in front of the station.

=== Platforms ===
2	■ Yamaguchi Line	for Yamaguchi and Shin-Yamaguchi
3	■ Yamaguchi Line	for Masuda and Hamada

== History ==
Tsuwano Station was opened on 5 August 1918 on the Japanese Government Railway Tsuwano Line when the line was extended from Tokusa Station. The line was further extended to Iwami Masuda Station (now Masuda Station) and became the Yamaguchi Line on 1 April 1923. With the privatization of the Japan National Railway (JNR) on 1 April 1987, the station came under the aegis of the West Japan railway Company (JR West).

== Passenger statistics ==
In fiscal 2020, the station was used by an average of 140 passengers daily.

== Surrounding area ==
- Tsuwano Preservation District for Groups of Traditional Buildings
- Tsuwano Town Office
- Former residence of Mori Ogai
- Tsuwano Castle Ruins

== See also ==
- List of railway stations in Japan
