= Masuda Station =

Railway station in Matsuda, Shimane Prefecture, Japan

Masuda Station 益田駅
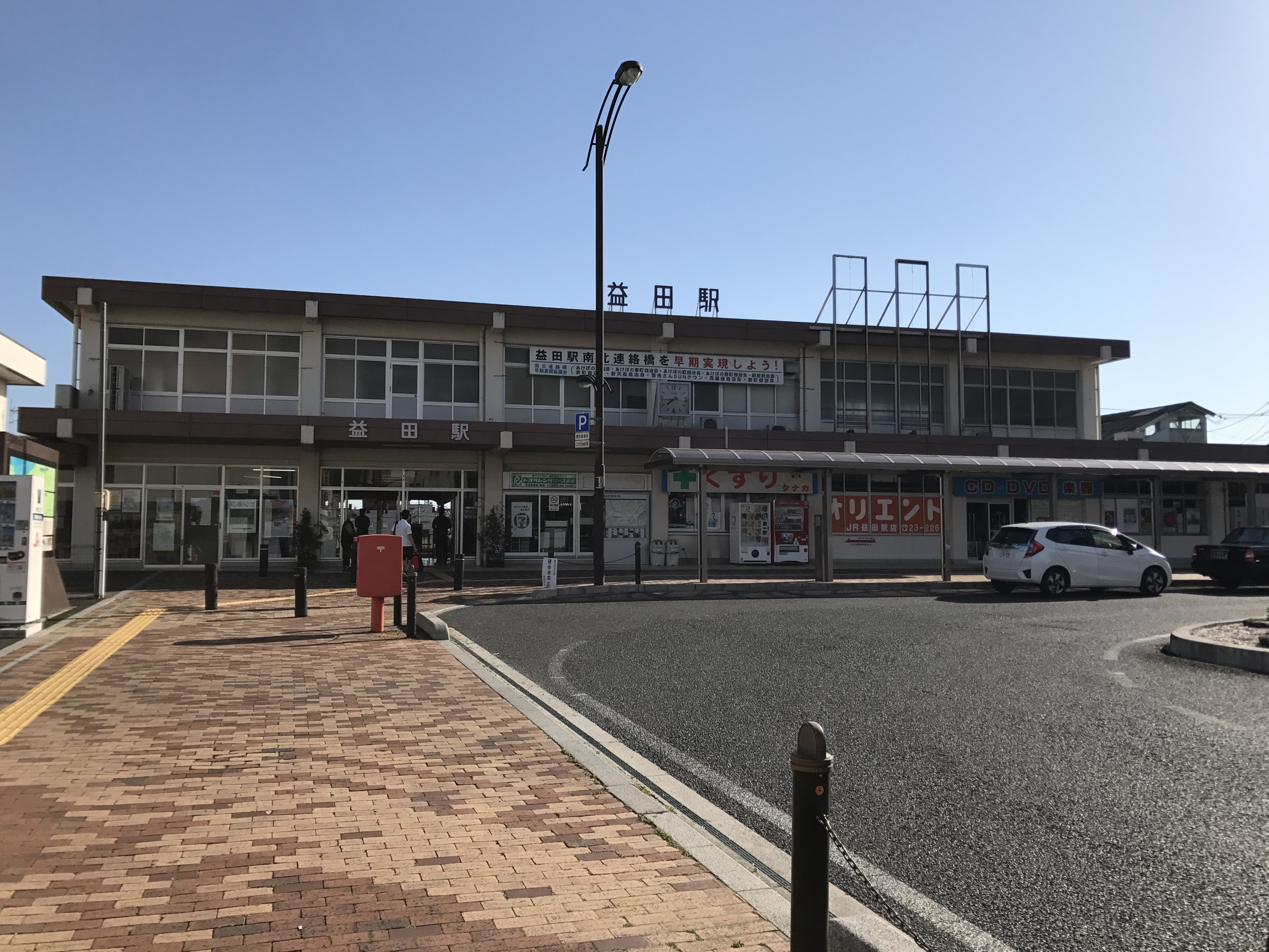
- Masuda Station, May 2017

General information
- Location: 105 Ekimae-chō, Masuda-shi, Shimane-ken 698-0024; Japan
- Coordinates: 34°40′41.9″N 131°50′20.2″E
- Owner: West Japan Railway Company
- Operator: West Japan Railway Company
- Line: D San'in Main Line
- Distance: 514.5 km (319.7 miles) from Kyoto
- Platforms: 1 side + 1 island platform
- Tracks: 4
- Connections: Bus stop

Construction
- Structure type: At grade

Other information
- Status: Staffed
- Website: Official website

History
- Opened: 1 April 1923; 103 years ago
- Former names: Iwami-Masuda (until 1966)

Passengers
- FY2020: 309

Services
Preceding station	JR West	Following station
Todakohama towards Shimonoseki	San'in Main Line E Local	Terminus
Terminus	San'in Line Local	Iwami-Tsuda towards Yonago
Honmataga towards Shin-Yamaguchi	Yamaguchi Line Local	Terminus
Location
- Location within Shimane Prefecture Location within Japan

Masuda Station (益田駅, Masuda-eki) is a passenger railway station located in the city of Masuda, Shimane Prefecture, Japan. It is operated by the West Japan Railway Company (JR West).

== Lines ==
Masuda Station is served by the JR West San'in Main Line, and is located 514.5 kilometers from the terminus of the line at Kyoto. It is also the northern terminus of the 93.8 kilometer Yamaguchi Line to Shin-Yamaguchi.

== Station layout ==
The station consists of one side platform adjacent to the station building, which is connected to an island platform by a footbridge. There is a siding track without a platform on the outer side of the island platform. The station is staffed.

== Platforms ==
1	■ D San'in Main Line	for Izumoshi, Matsue and Yonago
2	■ San'in Main Line	for Higashi-Hagi and Nagatoshi
3	■ Yamaguchi Line	for Tsuwano and Shin-Yamaguchi

== History ==
Masuda Station was opened as Iwami-Masuda Station (石見益田駅) by the Japan Government Railways San'in Main Line when the Yamaguchi Line was extended from Tsuwano Station on 1 April 1923. The San'in Main Line connected on 26 December of the same year. The station was renamed on 1 October 1966. With the privatization of the Japan National Railway (JNR) on 1 April 1987, the station came under the aegis of the West Japan Railway Company (JR West). Freight operations were discontinued on 1 April 2014.

== Passenger statistics ==
In fiscal 2020, the station was used by an average of 309 passengers daily.

== Surrounding area ==
- Masuda City Hall
- Masuda Tax Office
- Masuda Chamber of Commerce and Industry

== See also ==
- List of railway stations in Japan
