= List of highways numbered 188 =

The following highways are numbered 188:

== India ==
- State Highway 188 (Andhra Pradesh)

== Ireland ==
- R188 road (Ireland)

== Japan ==
- Japan National Route 188

== United Kingdom ==
- A188 road
- B188 road

== United States ==
- Alabama State Route 188
- Arizona State Route 188
- California State Route 188
- Connecticut Route 188
- Florida State Road 188
- Georgia State Route 188
- Iowa Highway 188
- K-188 (Kansas highway)
- Kentucky Route 188
- Maine State Route 188
- Maryland Route 188
- M-188 (Michigan highway)
- New Mexico State Road 188
- New York State Route 188 (former)
- Ohio State Route 188
- Pennsylvania Route 188
- South Carolina Highway 188
- Tennessee State Route 188
- Texas State Highway 188
  - Texas State Highway Spur 188
  - Farm to Market Road 188 (Texas)
  - Urban Road 188 (Texas, signed as Farm to Market Road 188)
- Utah State Route 188 (former)
- Virginia State Route 188
- Wisconsin Highway 188

Territories

- Puerto Rico Highway 188

Preceded by 187	Lists of highways 188	Succeeded by 189
