= List of highways numbered 185 =

Route 185 or Highway 185 may refer to:

== Canada ==
- Quebec Route 185

== India ==
- National Highway 185 (India)

== Ireland ==
- R185 road (Ireland)

== Japan ==
- Japan National Route 185

== Poland ==
- Voivodeship road 185

== United Kingdom ==
- A185 road
- B185 road

== United States ==
- Interstate 185
- U.S. Route 185 (former)
- Alabama State Route 185
- Arkansas Highway 185
- California State Route 185
- Connecticut Route 185
- Florida State Road 185 (former)
- Georgia State Route 185
- Hawaii Route 185
- Illinois Route 185
- K-185 (Kansas highway)
- Kentucky Route 185
- Maine State Route 185
- Maryland Route 185
- M-185 (Michigan highway)
- Missouri Route 185
- New Jersey Route 185
- New Mexico State Road 185
- New York State Route 185
- Ohio State Route 185
- Pennsylvania Route 185 (former)
- South Carolina Highway 185
- Tennessee State Route 185
- Texas State Highway 185
  - Texas State Highway Spur 185
  - Farm to Market Road 185 (Texas)
  - Urban Road 185 (Texas, signed as Farm to Market Road 185)
- Utah State Route 185 (former)
- Virginia State Route 185
- Wisconsin Highway 185

Territories

- Puerto Rico Highway 185

| Preceded by 184 | Lists of highways 185 | Succeeded by 186 |
