= Yamaguchi Prefecture =

Prefecture of Japan

Coordinates: 34°4′N 131°30′E

Yamaguchi Prefecture 山口県
- Prefecture

Japanese transcription(s)
  - Japanese: 山口県
  - Rōmaji: Yamaguchi-ken
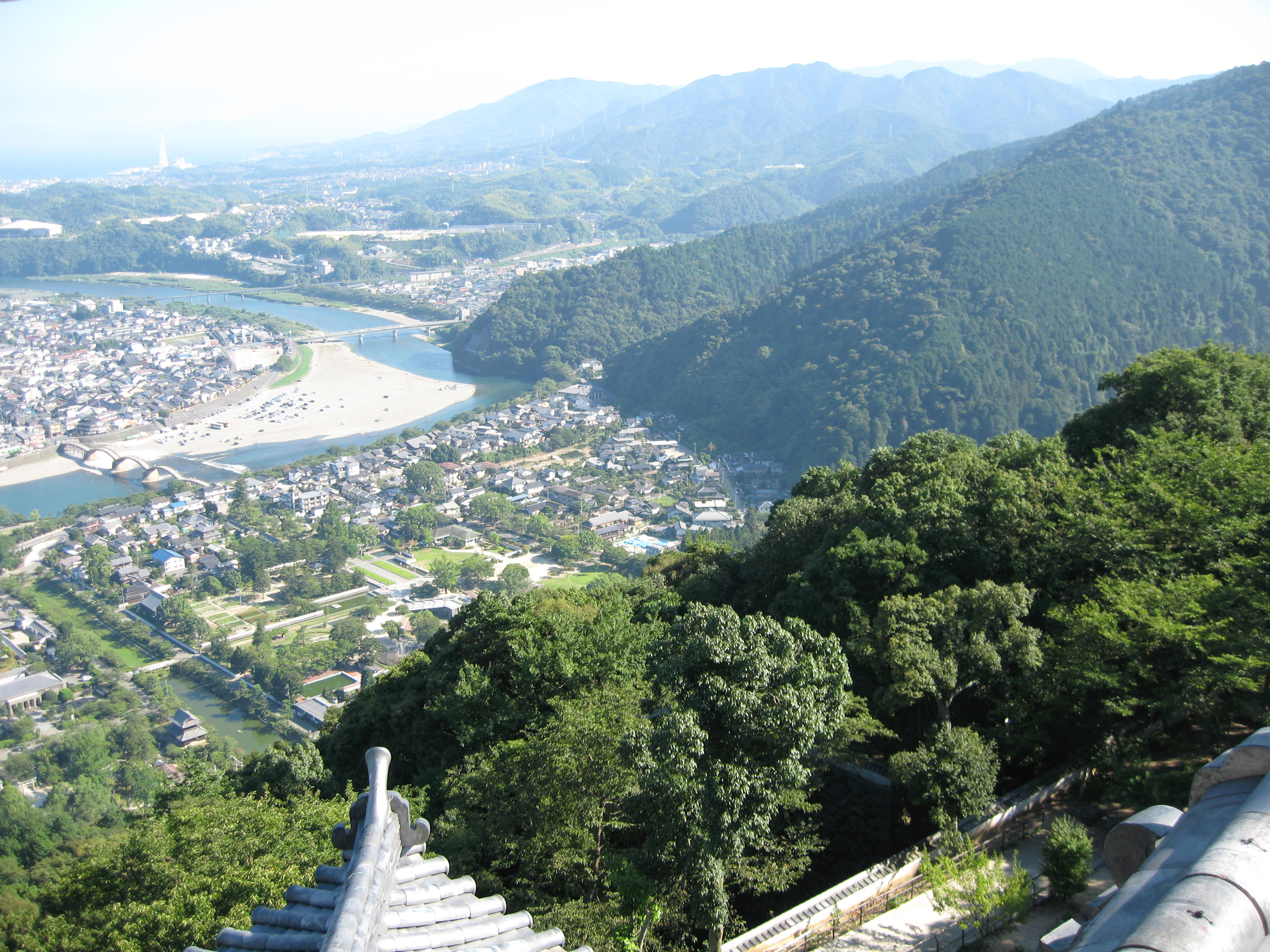
- View of Iwakuni City, Yamaguchi Prefecture from Iwakuni Castle. The famous Kintai Bridge can be seen over the Nishiki River.

- Flag Symbol
- Anthem: Yamaguchi kenmin no uta
- Country: Japan
- Region: Chūgoku (Sanyo)
- Island: Honshu
- Capital: Yamaguchi
- Largest city: Shimonoseki
- Subdivisions: Districts: 4, Municipalities: 19

Government
  - Governor: Tsugumasa Muraoka

Area
  - Total: 6,112.30 km^{2} (2,359.97 sq mi)
  - Rank: 23rd

Population (February 1, 2018)
  - Total: 1,377,631
  - Rank: 25th
  - Density: 225.43/km^{2} (583.9/sq mi)

GDP
  - Total: JP¥6,306 billion US$46.6 billion (2022)
- ISO 3166 code: JP-35
- Website: www.pref.yamaguchi.lg.jp/foreign/english/index.html
- Symbols of Japan
- Bird: Hooded crane (Grus monacha)
- Fish: Japanese puffer (Takifugu rubripes)
- Flower: Bitter summer mandarin blossom (Citrus natsudaidai)
- Tree: Red pine tree (Pinus densiflora)

Yamaguchi Prefecture (山口県, Yamaguchi-ken (Note: Japanese pronunciation: [jä̀.mä́.ɡɯ̈̀.c̟͡ɕì, -ŋɯ̈̀.c̟͡ɕì, -ɡɯ̈́.c̟͡ɕi̥.kè̞ɴ̀, -ŋɯ̈́.c̟͡ɕi̥-])) is a prefecture of Japan located in the Chūgoku region of Honshu. Yamaguchi Prefecture has a population of 1,377,631 (1 February 2018) and has a geographic area of 6,112 km^{2} (2,359 sq mi). Yamaguchi Prefecture borders Shimane Prefecture to the north and Hiroshima Prefecture to the northeast.

Yamaguchi is the capital of the prefecture and Shimonoseki is the largest city, with other major cities including Ube, Shūnan, and Iwakuni. Yamaguchi Prefecture is located at the western tip of Honshu with coastlines on the Sea of Japan and Seto Inland Sea, and separated from the island of Kyushu by the Kanmon Straits.

== History ==
Yamaguchi Prefecture was created by the merger of the provinces of Suō and Nagato. During the rise of the samurai class during the Heian and Kamakura Periods (794–1333), the Ouchi family of Suō Province and the Koto family of Nagato Province gained influence as powerful warrior clans. In the Muromachi period (1336—1573), Ouchi Hiroyo, the 24th ruler of the Ouchi family conquered both areas of Yamaguchi Prefecture. The Ouchi clan imitated the city planning of Kyoto. They gained great wealth through cultural imports from the continent and trade with Korea and Ming Dynasty China. As a result, Yamaguchi came to be known as the "Kyoto of the West," and Ouchi culture flourished. Sue Harutaka defeated the 31st ruler of the Ouchi clan. The Sue clan was then defeated by Mōri Motonari, and the Mōri family gained control of the Chūgoku region. Yamaguchi was ruled as part of the Mōri clan domain during the Sengoku period. Mōri Terumoto was then defeated by Tokugawa Ieyasu in the battle of Sekigahara in 1600. He was forced to give up all his land except for the Suō and Nagato areas (current-day Yamaguchi Prefecture), where he built his castle in Hagi. Mōri sought to strengthen the economic base of the region and increase local production with his Three Whites campaign (salt, rice, and paper).

After Commodore Matthew Perry's opening of Japan, clans from Nagato (also called Chōshū) played a key role in the fall of the Tokugawa shogunate and the establishment of the new imperial government. Four years after the Edo Shogunate was overthrown and the Meiji government formed in 1868, the present Yamaguchi Prefecture was established. The Meiji government brought in many new systems and modern policies, and promoted the introduction of modern industry, though the prefecture was still centered on agriculture during this period. In the Taishō period, from 1912 to 1926, shipbuilding, chemical, machinery, and metal working plants were built in Yamaguchi's harbors in the Seto Inland Sea area. During the post-World War II Shōwa Period, Yamaguchi developed into one of the most industrialized prefectures in the country due to the establishment of petrochemical complexes.

== Geography ==
As of April 1, 2012, 7% of the total land area of the prefecture was designated as Natural Parks, namely the Setonaikai National Park; Akiyoshidai, Kita-Nagato Kaigan, and Nishi-Chūgoku Sanchi Quasi-National Parks; and Chōmonkyō, Iwakiyama, Rakanzan, and Toyota Prefectural Natural Parks.

=== Current municipalities ===
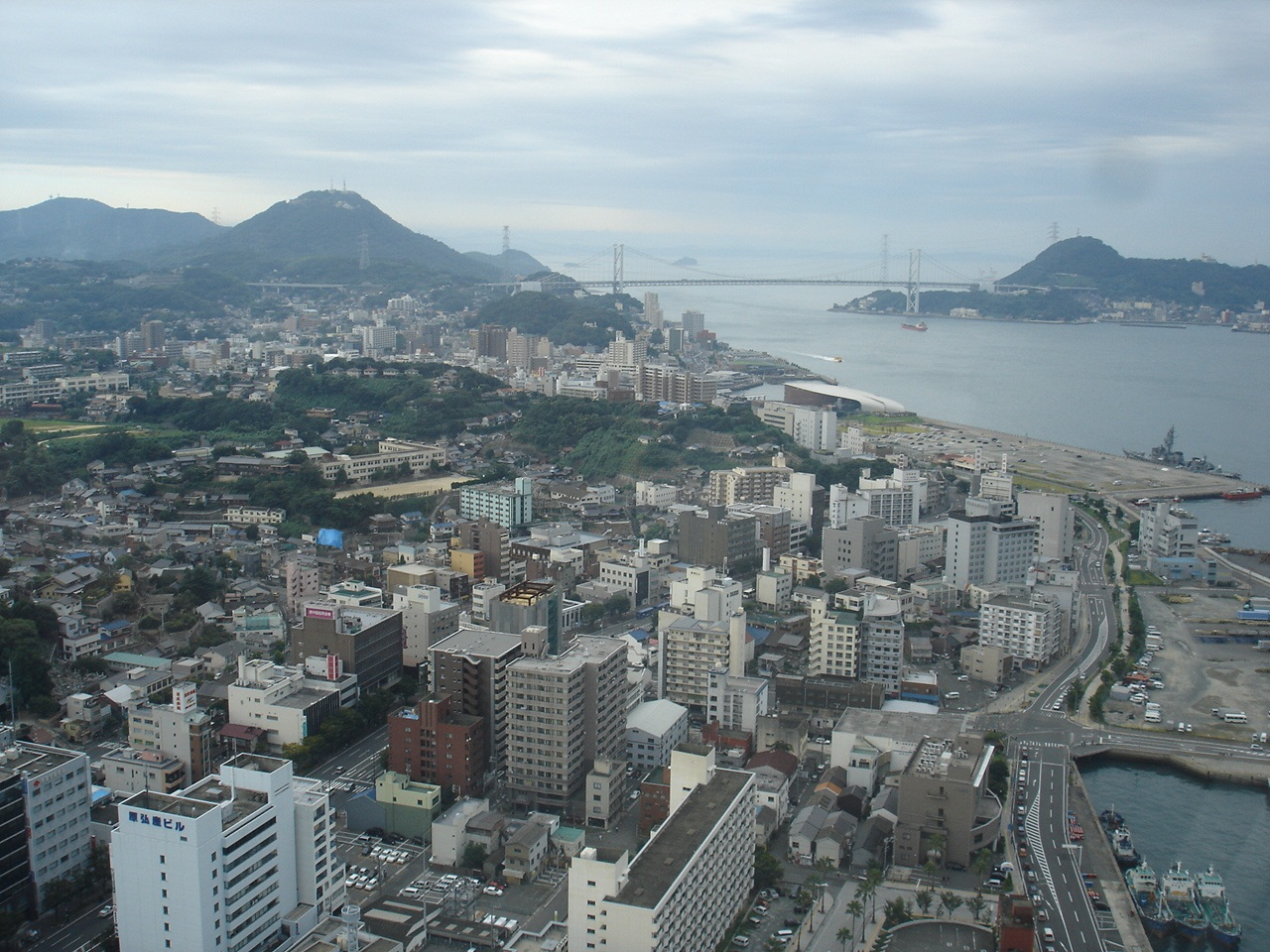
Shimonoseki and Kanmon Strait

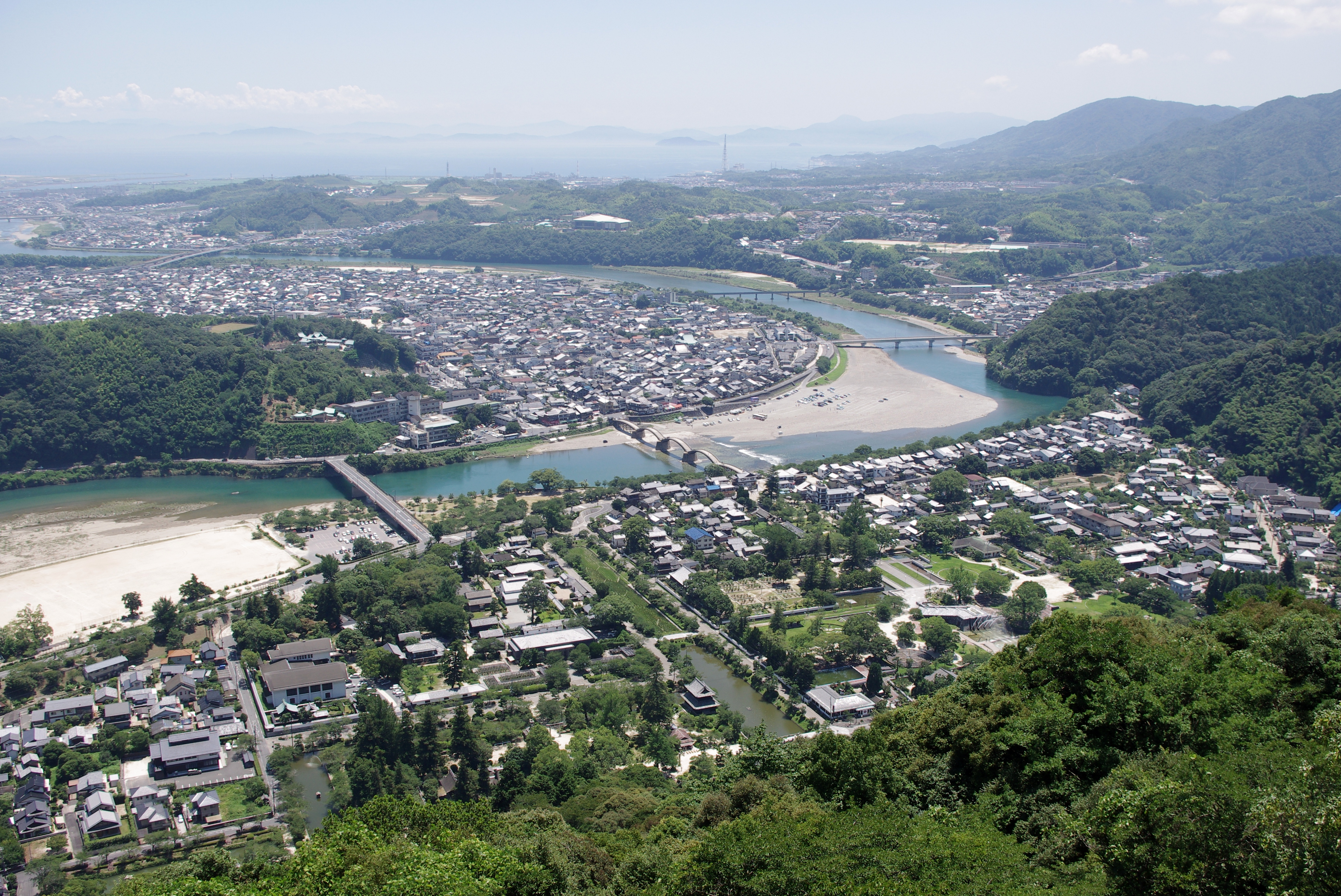
Iwakuni

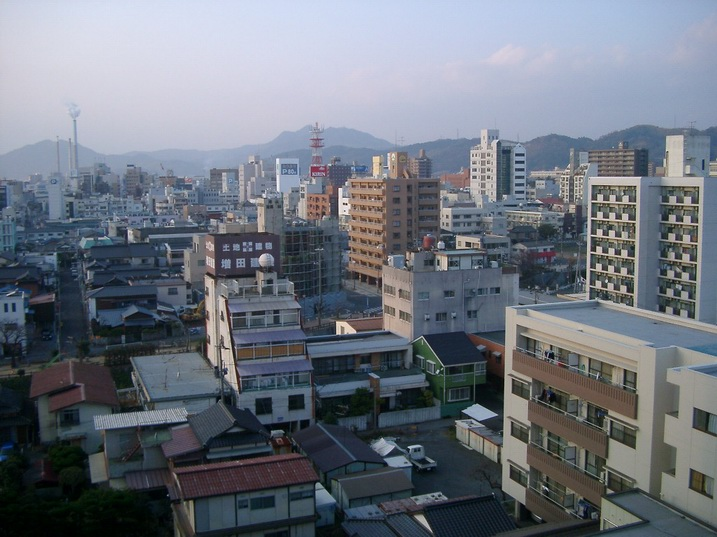
Shunan

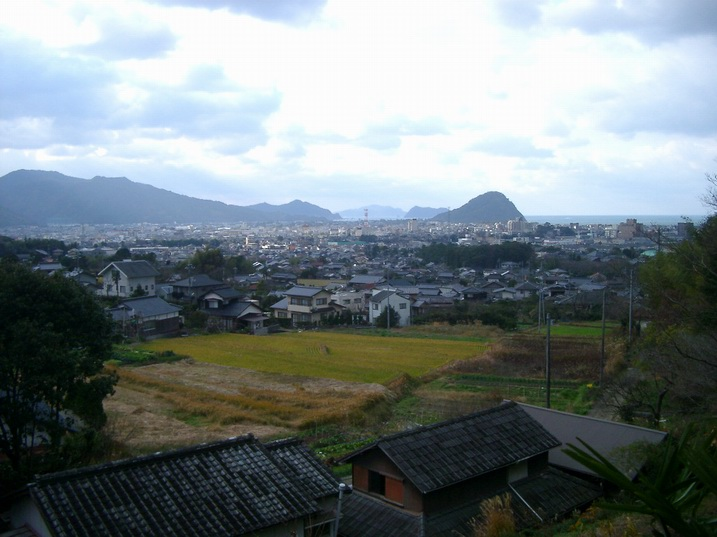
Hagi

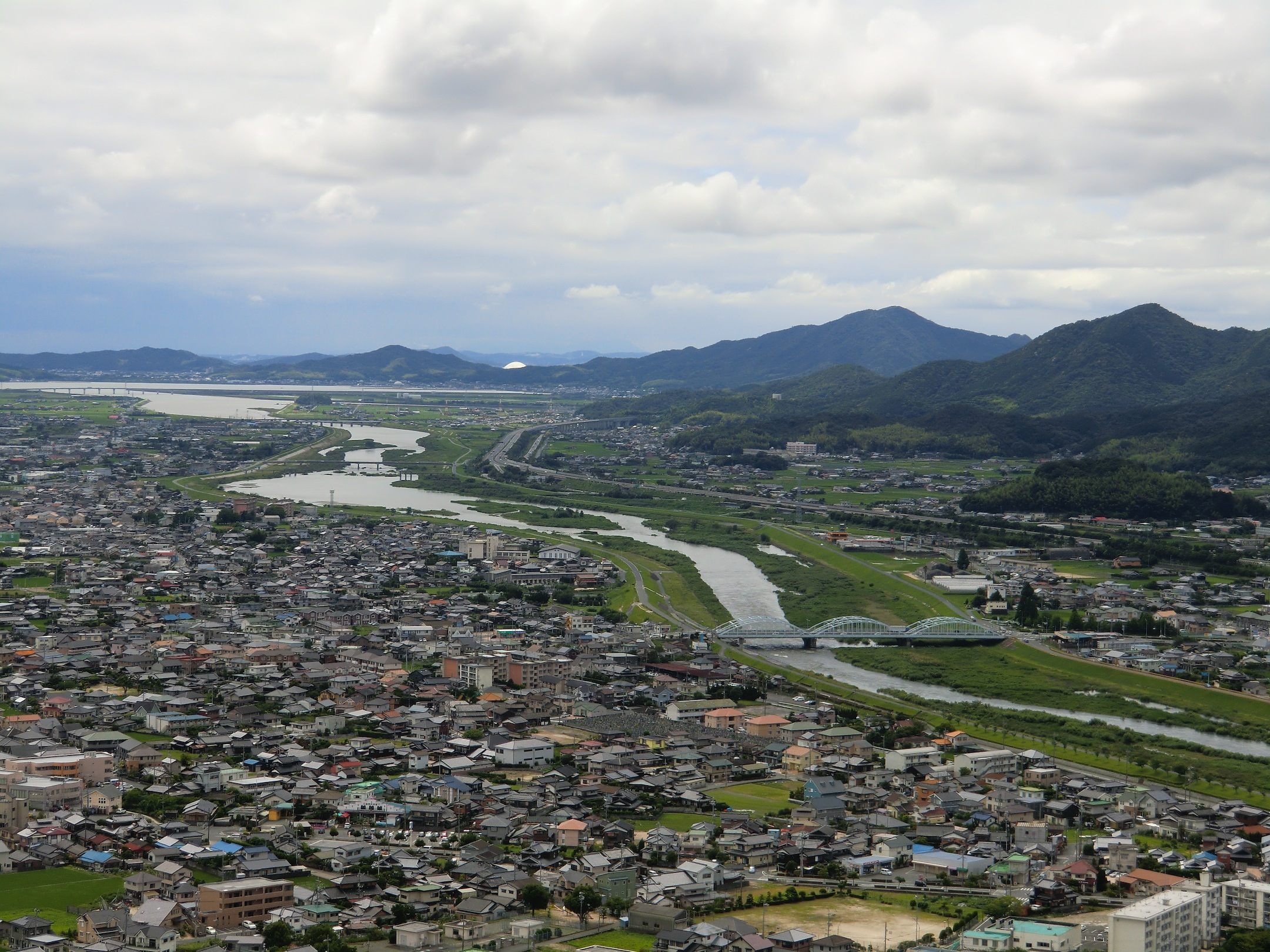
Hofu

Municipalities in Yamaguchi Prefecture City Town

==== Cities ====
Thirteen cities are located in Yamaguchi Prefecture.

| Name | | Area (km^{2}) | Population | Map |
| Rōmaji | Kanji | Area (km^{2}) | Population | Map |
|---|---|---|---|---|
| Hagi | 萩市 | 698.31 | 43,233 | |
| Hikari | 光市 | 92.13 | 49,100 | |
| Hōfu | 防府市 | 189.37 | 114,846 | |
| Iwakuni | 岩国市 | 873.72 | 127,512 | |
| Kudamatsu | 下松市 | 89.35 | 56,892 | |
| Mine | 美祢市 | 472.64 | 21,919 | |
| Nagato | 長門市 | 357.31 | 31,518 | |
| San'yō-Onoda | 山陽小野田市 | 133.09 | 59,867 | |
| Shimonoseki | 下関市 | 716.18 | 248,193 | |
| Shūnan | 周南市 | 656.29 | 137,019 | |
| Ube | 宇部市 | 286.65 | 159,256 | |
| Yamaguchi (capital) | 山口市 | 1,023.23 | 191,470 | |
| Yanai | 柳井市 | 140.05 | 29,821 | |

==== Towns ====
These are the towns in each district:

| Name | | Area (km^{2}) | Population | District | Map |
| Rōmaji | Kanji | Area (km^{2}) | Population | District | Map |
|---|---|---|---|---|---|
| Abu | 阿武町 | 115.95 | 3,054 | Abu District | |
| Hirao | 平生町 | 34.59 | 11,064 | Kumage District | |
| Kaminoseki | 上関町 | 34.69 | 2,340 | Kumage District | |
| Suō-Ōshima | 周防大島町 | 138.17 | 13,774 | Ōshima District | |
| Tabuse | 田布施町 | 50.42 | 14,411 | Kumage District | |
| Waki | 和木町 | 10.58 | 5,927 | Kuga District | |

== Economic development ==
For the purposes of development analysis, Yamaguchi is construed to be part of Northern Kyushu. Although Yamaguchi is not part of the island of Kyushu, it has become a functional satellite of the Kanmon Straits metropolitan area.

== Demographics ==
Yamaguchi prefecture population pyramid in 2020

Per Japanese census data, Yamaguchi prefecture had negative population growth from 1955 to 1973, and from 1985–present.

Historical population
| Year | Pop. | ±% |
|---|---|---|
| 1920 | 1,041,000 | — |
| 1930 | 1,136,000 | +9.1% |
| 1940 | 1,294,000 | +13.9% |
| 1950 | 1,541,000 | +19.1% |
| 1960 | 1,602,000 | +4.0% |
| 1970 | 1,511,000 | −5.7% |
| 1980 | 1,587,000 | +5.0% |
| 1990 | 1,573,000 | −0.9% |
| 2000 | 1,527,964 | −2.9% |
| 2010 | 1,451,338 | −5.0% |
| 2020 | 1,368,495 | −5.7% |
| 2023 | 1,301,479 | −4.9% |
as of June 2023

== Tourism ==
The most popular place for tourism is Shimonoseki, which has the Karato Fish Market and a large fireworks festival in summer.

Another attraction is the Kintai Bridge in the town of Iwakuni. This five-arched wooden structure is considered a symbol of Western Honshū. The area on the banks of the Nishiki river close to the bridge is considered among the best places in Japan for Hanami, when groups of family and friends gather in early April to view cherry blossoms.

Hagi City is in the north of Yamaguchi. It is a very traditional city. The usual color of Japanese post boxes is red, but in Hagi they are painted green or brown. The Hagi Museum is modeled after a traditional samurai residence. The exhibits are detailed and realistic, and are changed every year. The permanent collection is data about Hagi's history and collections about Takasugi Shinsaku. Hagi also contains a reverberatory furnace which has been designated a World Heritage Site.

Kawara soba (hot tile noodles) is a popular dish in Yamaguchi. It was developed during the Seinan Rebellion when soldiers cooked wild grass and meat on hot tiles. Today people in Yamaguchi create this dish by frying green tea noodles on a hot tile, and arranging a thin fried egg, stewed beef, green onions, and grilled liver on top.

Akiyoshidai Quasi-National Park, which includes Japan's longest cave, the Akiyoshido (秋芳洞), is another popular destination.

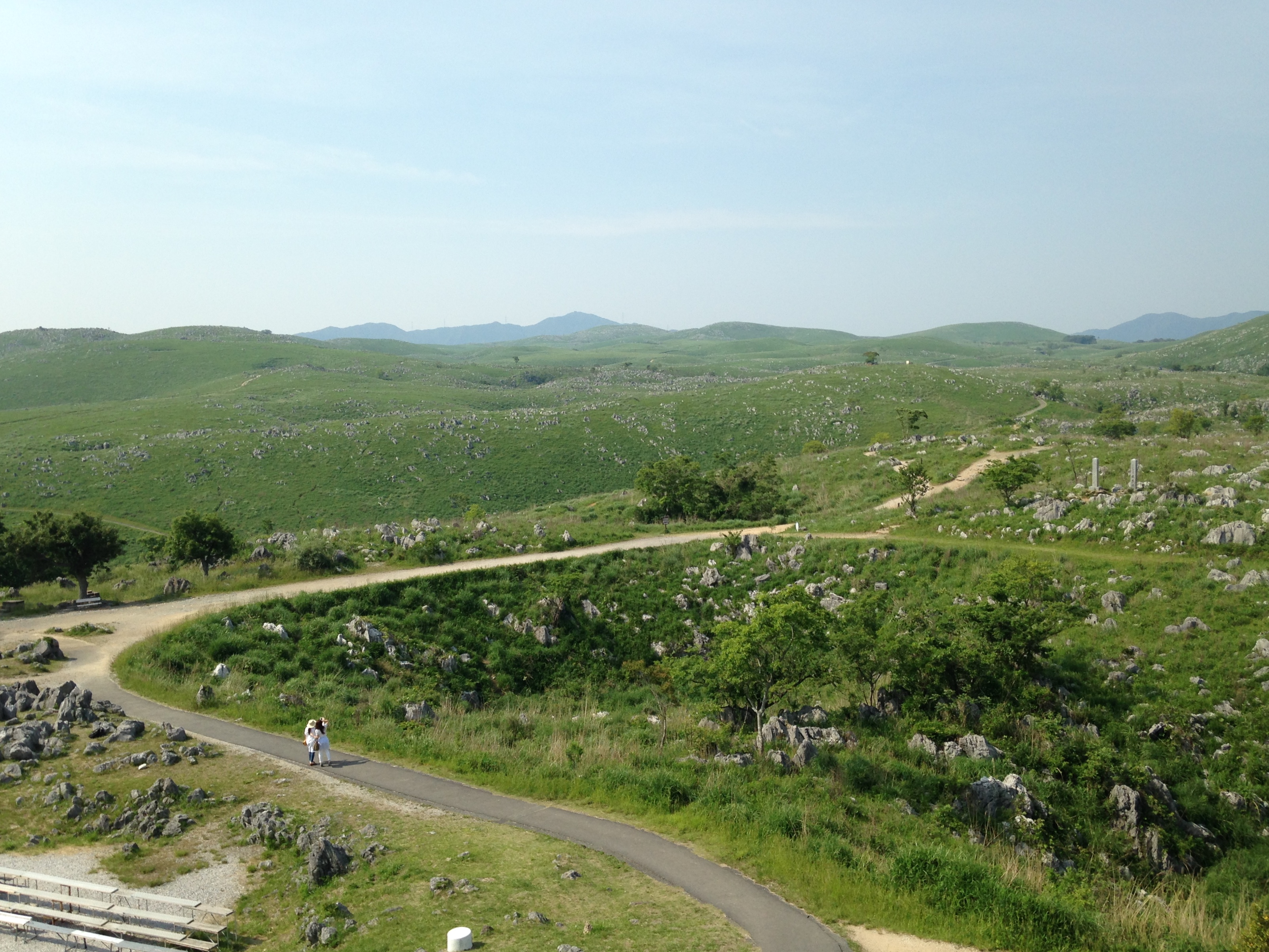
Akiyoshi Plateau

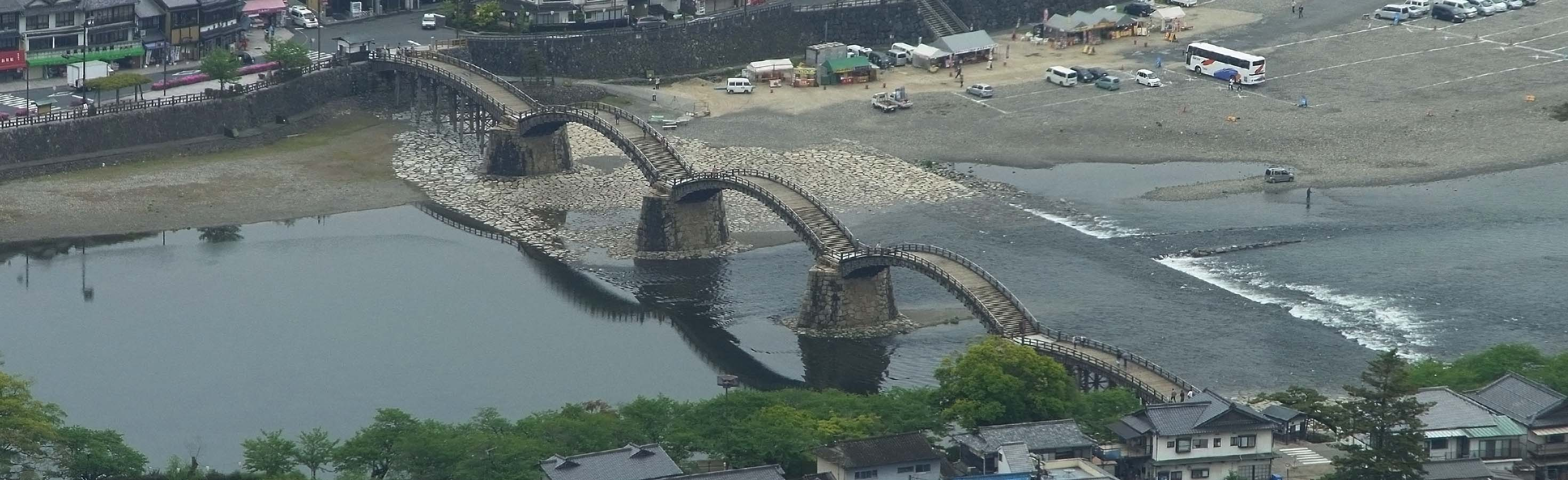
Kintai Bridge in Iwakuni

== Famous festivals and events ==
- Kintaikyo Festival in Iwakuni - held on April 29
- Nishiki River Water Festival in Iwakuni - held in August
- Iwakuni Festival in August
- Yokomichi Festival, Kintai Bridge November 19
- Yanai Goldfish Lantern Festival in August
- Yamaguchi Gion Festival on July 20 to 27
- Yamaguchi Tanabata Lantern Festival on August 6 to 7
- Hagi Era Festival in April
- Hagi Festival on August 2 to 3
- Shimonoseki Strait Festival on May 2 to 4
- Shimonoseki Firework Festival in August

== Education ==
=== Universities ===
- Baiko Gakuin University (private)
- National Fisheries University (national)
- Shimonoseki City University (public)
- Tokyo University of Science, Yamaguchi (public)
- Ube Frontier University (private)
- University of East Asia (private)
- Yamaguchi Gakugei College (private)
- Yamaguchi Prefectural University (public)
- Yamaguchi University (national)
- Yamaguchi University of Human Welfare and Culture (private)

== Transportation ==
=== Ferries from Shimonoseki Port International Terminal ===
Two ferry services provide regular sea transport from the Shimonoseki Port International Terminal: Kanpu Ferry provides round-trip service to Busan, South Korea; the Orient Ferry provides round-trip service to Qingdao and Shanghai, respectively.

- Kanpu ferry to Busan in South Korea regularly
- Gwangyang Beech to Gwangyang in South Korea regularly
- Orient ferry to Qingdao in China regularly
- Orient ferry to Shanghai in China regularly

=== Other ferry routes ===
- Shunan-Kunisaki, Kyushu
- Yanai-Matsuyama, Shikoku

=== Air ===
- Iwakuni Kintaikyo Airport
- Yamaguchi Ube Airport

=== Railway ===
- Nishikigawa Railway
- West Japan Railway Company
  - Gantoku Line
  - Onoda Line
  - Mine Line
  - Sanin Line
  - Sanyō Shinkansen
  - San'yō Main Line
  - Ube Line
  - Yamaguchi Line

=== Roads ===
==== Expressways ====
- Chūgoku Expressway
- Sanyo Expressway

==== Toll roads ====
- Hagi Misumi Road
- Kanmon Bridge
- Yamaguchi Ube Onoda Road
- Ogori Hagi Road
- Kanmon Road Tunnel

==== National highways ====
- Route 2
- Route 9
- Route 187 (Iwakuni-Tsuwano-Masuda)
- Route 188 (Iwakuni-Yanai-Hikari-Kudamatsu)
- Route 189
- Route 190
- Route 191
- Route 262
- Route 315 (Shunan-Hagi)
- Route 316
- Route 376 (Yamaguchi-Shunan-Iwakuni)
- Route 434
- Route 435
- Route 437
- Route 489
- Route 490
- Route 491
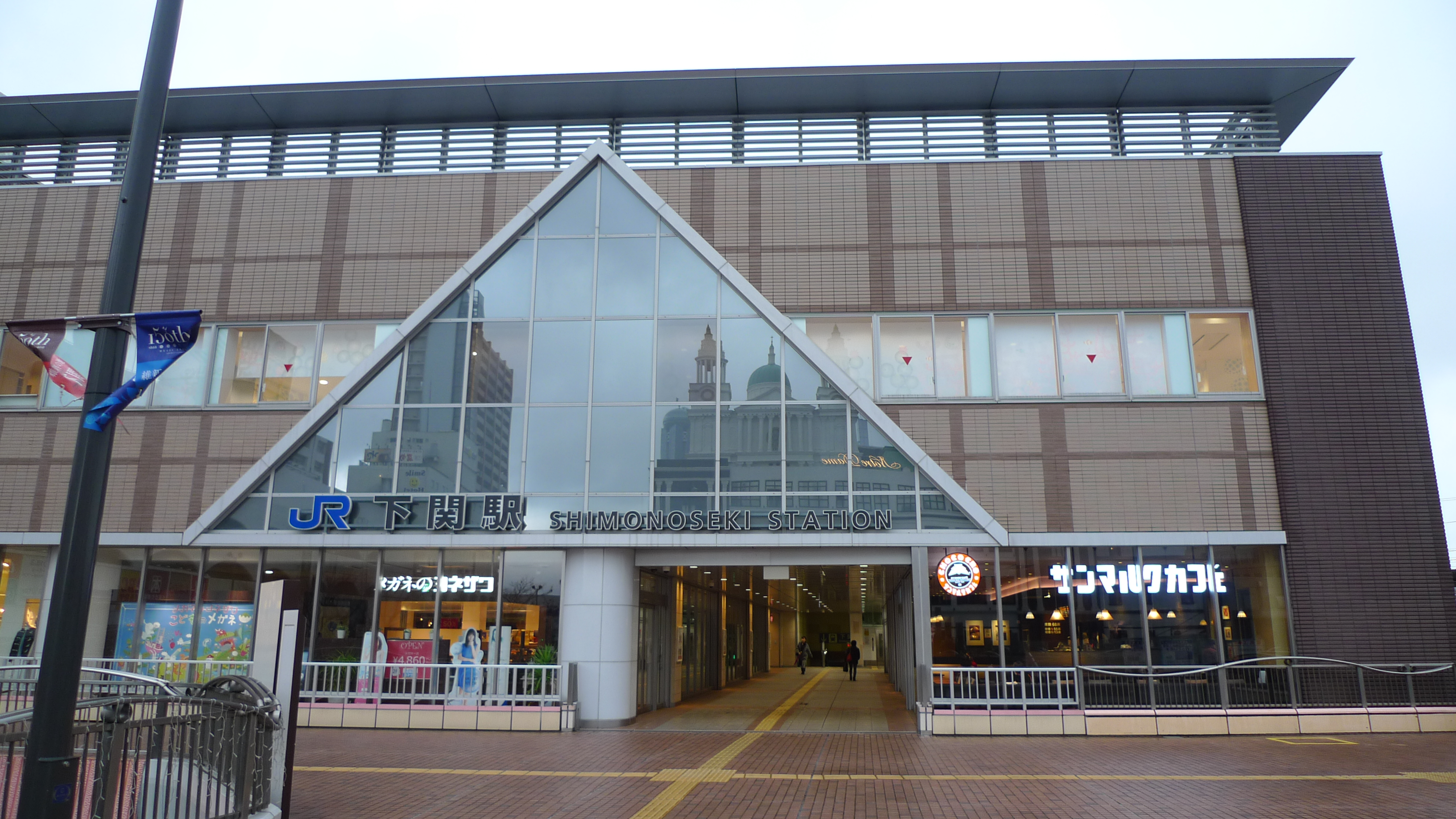
JR Shimonoseki Station

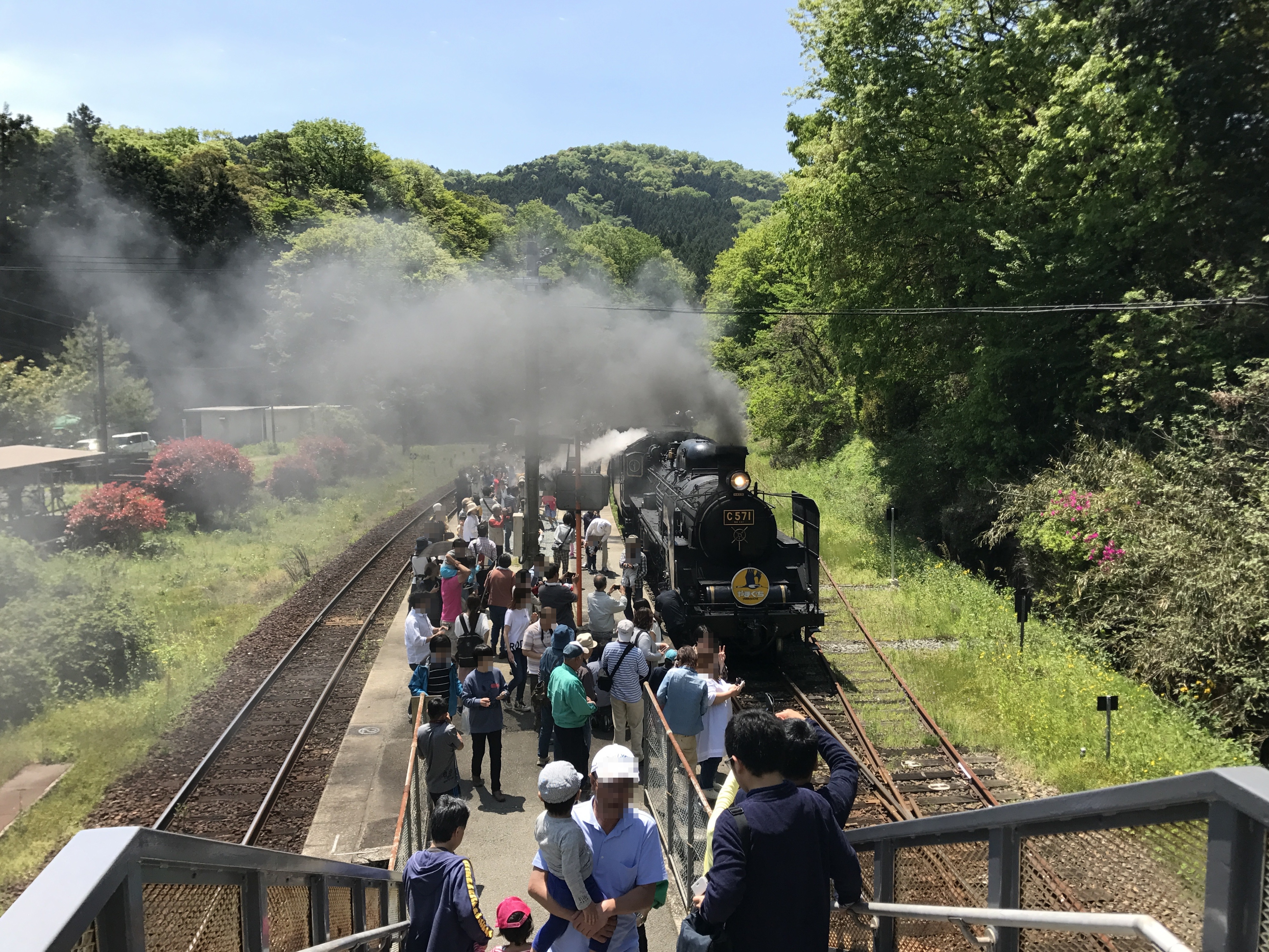
An event train Yamaguchi in JR Yamaguchi Line

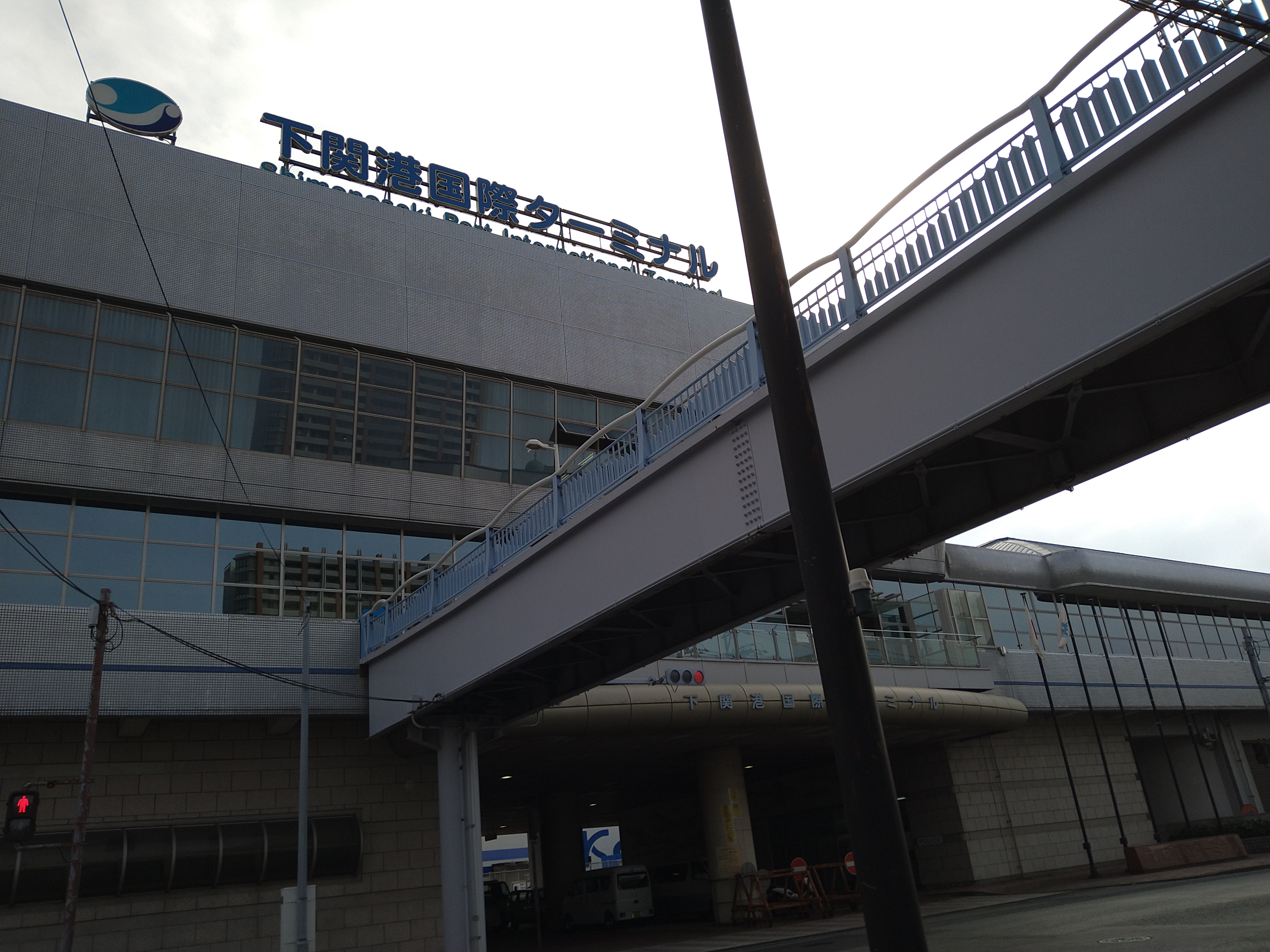
Shimonoseki International Ferry Terminal

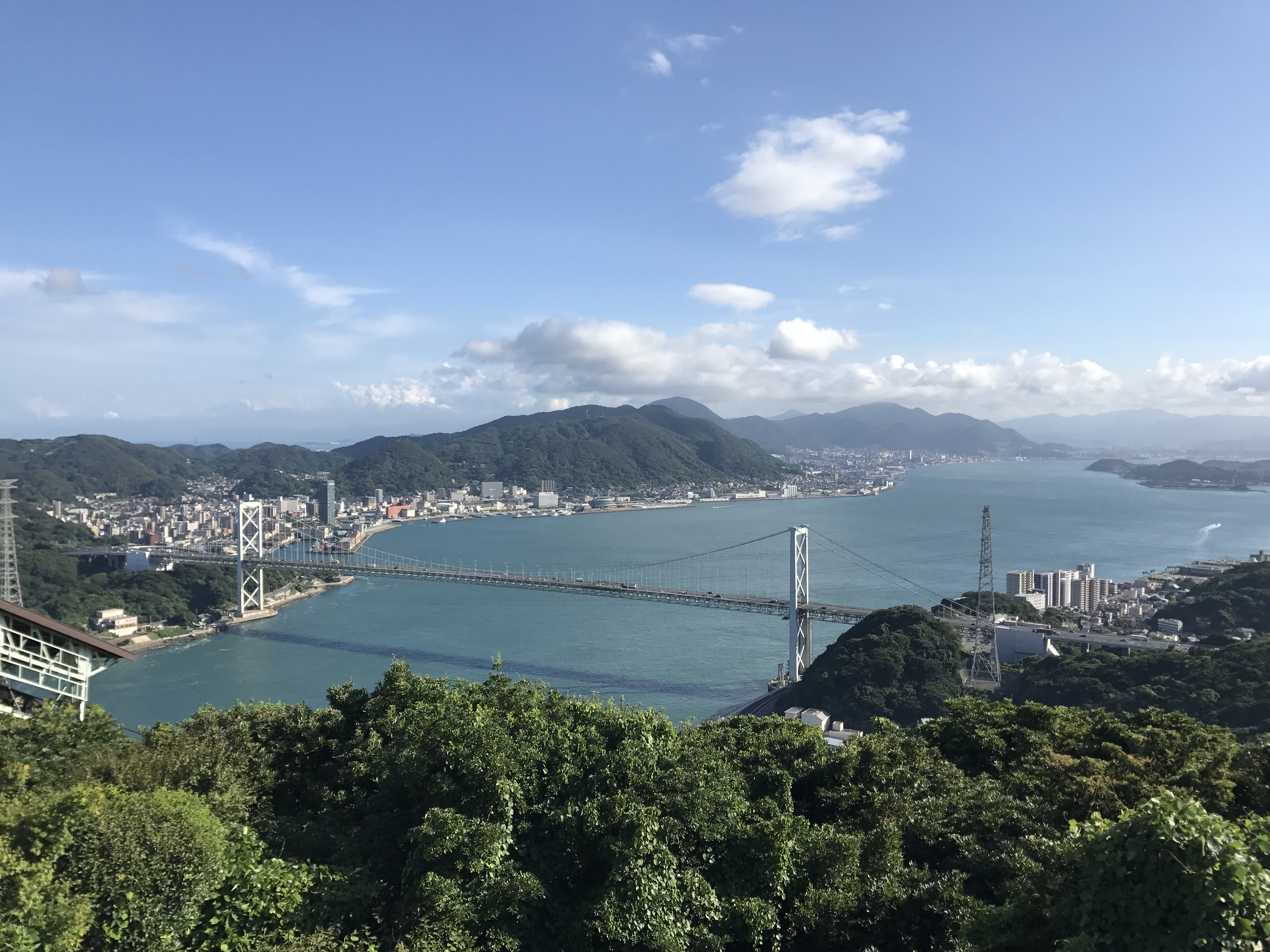
View of Kanmon Bridge from side of Shimonoseki

== Prefectural symbols ==
- Tree: Red pine tree (Pinus densiflora)
- Flower: Bitter summer mandarin blossom (Citrus natsudaidai)
- Bird: Hooded crane (Grus monacha)
- Fish: Tetraodontidae (Takifugu rubripes)
- Beast: Sika deer (Cervus nippon nippon)
- Mascot: Choruru

== Media ==
=== Newspapers ===
- Yamaguchi Shimbun

=== TV ===
- KRY TV (NNN)
- NHK TV
- TSS TV/TNC TV (FNN)
- TYS TV (JNN)
- YAB TV (ANN)

=== Radio ===
- FMY (JFN)

== Notable people from Yamaguchi Prefecture ==
=== Business ===
- Aikawa Yoshisuke Japanese entrepreneur, businessman, politician, and founder of the Nissan zaibatsu
- Yanai Tadashi, Japanese businessman, founder and president of Fast Retailing, of which Uniqlo is a subsidiary
- Yamaguchi Harukichi, founder of the Yamaguchi-gumi, born near Kobe but his entire family hailed from Yamaguchi.
- Viscount Inoue Masaru, "father of the Japanese railways", member of the Chōshū Five, the first Japanese students to study in England following the opening of Japan

=== Entertainment ===
- Anno Hideaki, film director known for Neon Genesis Evangelion. Filmed scenes of Shiki-Jitsu in his hometown of Ube.
- Housako Kaori, professional wrestler currently signed to WWE and former World Wonder Ring Stardom employee
- Karyu, guitarist of the band D'espairsRay. The band had a "homecoming" in Yamaguchi in 2007 and 2009.
- Michishige, a Japanese idol who is one of the sixth-generation members of Japanese idol group Morning Musume
- Mikami Shinji, video game designer; the God-father of the survival horror genre of video games
- Mitsutada Yasunori, composer
- Ruka (rapper), main rapper in Babymonster
- Sadamoto Yoshiyuki, a Japanese character designer, manga artist, and founding member of Gainax
- Shaura, singer
- Tamura Atsushi of the comic duo London Boots Ichi-go Ni-go is from Shimonoseki
- Urushibara Yuki, manga artist, creator of Mushishi
- Utada Teruzane, music producer, manager and father of Hikaru Utada

=== Government ===
==== Prime ministers ====
- Shinzo Abe, Nobusuke Kishi, and Eisaku Satō, post-war Prime Ministers (56, 57, 61, 62, 63, 90, 96, 97, & 98th). They form the nucleus of the modern Satō-Kishi-Abe political dynasty
- Prince Itō Hirobumi, first prime minister of Japan (and the 5th, 7th & 10th), genrō, and member of the Chōshū Five
- Kan Naoto, 94th Prime Minister born in Ube
- Prince Katsura Tarō, genro, Governor General of Taiwan, Minister of War, and the 11th, 13th, & 15th Prime Minister
- Baron Tanaka Giichi, Army Minister, Foreign Minister, and the 26th Prime Minister
- Count Terauchi Masatake, gensui, Governor General of Korea, and the 18th Prime Minister
- Prince Yamagata Aritomo, genro, Army Chief of Staff, and the 3rd and 9th Prime Minister

==== Other government officials ====
- Abe Shintaro, former Minister of Foreign Affairs and General Secretary of the LDP. Father of Shinzo Abe
- Marquess Inoue Kaoru, genro, Foreign and Finance Minister, member of the Chōshū Five
- Kido Takayoshi, one of the Three Great Nobles, architects of the Meiji Restoration
- Matsuoka Yōsuke, diplomat, Foreign Minister, architect of the WWII era Tripartite Pact
- Yoshimasa Hayashi serves as Minister for Foreign Affairs since November 2021. Born in Shimonoseki

=== Military ===
- Baron Arichi Shinanojō, admiral in the Imperial Japanese Navy, Chief of the Imperial Japanese Navy General Staff
- Baron Arisaka Nariakira, lieutenant general in the Imperial Japanese Army, inventor of the Arisaka Rifle
- Count Hasegawa Yoshimichi, Imperial Japanese Army field marshal and Governor General of Korea
- Iida Shojiro, a Japanese general during World War II who led the invasions of Thailand and Burma
- Count Nogi Maresuke, general in the Imperial Japanese Army, and a prominent figure in the Russo-Japanese War
- Ōmura Masujirō, "Father of the modern Japanese Army"
- Viscount Ōshima Yoshimasa, Japanese Army General and Governor-General of Kwantung
- Tanaka Raizo, a Japanese rear admiral during World War II
- Baron Tsuboi Kōzō, Navy Vice Admiral, commandant of the Naval Academy, distinguished at the Battle of the Yalu

=== Sports ===
- Akimura Norihiro, former professional baseball player, current Nippon Professional Baseball umpire
- Fujimoto Hideo, former professional baseball player, inducted into the Japanese Baseball Hall of Fame
- Ishikawa Kasumi, silver medalist in Women's Team Table Tennis at the London 2012 Olympics, is from Yamaguchi City
- Iwamasa Daiki, former professional association football player and manager
- Iwatani Mayu, professional wrestler currently signed to World Wonder Ring Stardom
- Kawamura Yuki, professional basketball player, currently contracted to the Los Angeles Clippers
- Kubo Yūya, former professional association football player, notably for BSC Young Boys and FC Cincinnati
- Masateru Kaiketsu, sumo wrestler, ōzeki, and chairman of the Japan Sumo Association 2010–2012

== Sister districts ==
Yamaguchi Prefecture has alliances with the following five districts.

- Bình Dương Province, Vietnam (since 2014)
- Krasnodar Krai, Russia (since 2017)
- Pamplona, Navarre, Spain (since 1980)
- Shandong Province, China (since 1982)
- South Gyeongsang Province, South Korea (since 1987)

== Politics ==
Since the Meiji Restoration in which lower-rank nobility from Chōshū played a major role, many politicians from Yamaguchi have held important positions in national politics. In the post-war era, the most prominent political family from Yamaguchi is the Kishi-Abe/Satō prime ministerial dynasty, and Yamaguchi is leaning solidly towards the Liberal Democratic Party (LDP).

=== Delegation to the National Diet ===
Since the electoral reform of the 1990s, Yamaguchi elects four members directly to the House of Representatives. Three of the new single-member districts have been held exclusively by Liberal Democrats as of 2013, the easternmost district bordering Hiroshima was initially won by Shinji Satō (Eisaku Satō's son) in 1996, but went to Democrat Hideo Hiraoka in several later elections. Currently, following the 2021 general election, Yamaguchi's directly elected delegation to the lower house consists of former LDP vice president Masahiko Kōmura (1st district, 12th term), the chairman of the foreign affairs committee, Nobuo Kishi (2nd district, 2nd term, former two-term member of the House of Councillors), and the chairman of the House of Representatives rules committee (as of 190th Diet, January 2016), Yoshimasa Hayashi (3rd district, 1st term). The seat for the 4th district was held by former prime minister Shinzo Abe until his assassination in 2022, and is currently vacant. For the proportional representation segment of the House of Representatives, Yamaguchi forms part of the Chūgoku block.

In the House of Councillors, Yamaguchi is represented by two members, making it one of the currently 31 winner-take-all single-member districts. As of 2013, the two members are Yoshimasa Hayashi (LDP, 4th term, up in 2019), agriculture minister in the 2nd Abe Cabinet, and following the April 2013 by-election to replace Nobuo Kishi, Kiyoshi Ejima (LDP, 1st term, up in 2016), former mayor of Shimonoseki city.

=== Governor ===
The current governor of Yamaguchi is former MIC bureaucrat Tsugumasa Muraoka. He won the gubernatorial election in February 2014 with more than 60% of the vote against other two candidates, and succeeded Shigetarō Yamamoto who had been hospitalized since October 2013 and resigned in January 2014.

Elected governors of Yamaguchi have been:

1. Tatsuo Tanaka, 1947–1953 (2 terms, resigned mid-term to enter national politics), the son of pre-war prime minister Baron Giichi Tanaka
2. Tarō Ozawa, 1953–1960 (2 terms, resigned mid-term to enter national politics), Tanaka's son-in-law
3. Masayuki Hashimoto, 1960–1976 (4 terms), previously member of the House of Representatives from Yamaguchi for the LDP
4. Tōru Hirai, 1976–1996 (5 terms), previously Home Affairs Ministry bureaucrat and vice-governor of Yamaguchi under Hashimoto
5. Sekinari Nii, 1996–2012 (4 terms), previously Home Affairs Ministry bureaucrat and treasurer of Yamaguchi under Hirai
6. Shigetarō Yamamoto, 2012–2014 (1 term, resigned for health reasons), former LDP candidate for the House of Representatives in Yamaguchi's 2nd district

=== Assembly ===
The Yamaguchi Prefectural Assembly has 47 members, elected in unified local elections in 15 electoral districts: 5 single-member districts, four two-member districts and six districts that elect each between four and nine members. In the 2015 election, the LDP won a majority. Liberal Democrats form several parliamentary groups together with independents. As of June 8, 2015, the assembly is composed as follows: LDP 24 members, LDP Shinseikai 5, Kōmeitō 5, DPJ/Rengō no Kai 4, LDP Kensei Club 2, JCP 2, SDP/Citizens League 2, and the independent "groups" shinsei club, mushozoku no kai and kusa no ne have one member each.
