= Utah State Route 183 (disambiguation) =

State Route 183

Location
- Country: United States
- State: Utah

Highway system
- Utah State Highway System; Interstate; US; State; Minor; Scenic
← SR-182	→ SR-184

Utah State Route 183 is a two-segment 1.306-mile (2.102 km) route that loops around the Ogden–Weber Technical College in Ogden, with a one-way pair spurring west to SR-235 (Washington Boulevard) near that route's south end.

Utah State Route 183 may also refer to:

- Utah State Route 183 (1935-1969), a former state highway in Ogden, Utah, United States, that connected Utah State Route 235 (Washington Boulevard/North 400 East) with the State Industrial School in Ogden (now known as the Ogden-Weber Technical College) along AVC Lane (now Tech College Drive)
- Utah State Route 183A (1939-1963), East 700 North, a former state highway in Ogden, Utah, United States, that connected Utah State Route 235 (Washington Boulevard/North 400 East) with the Utah State Tuberculosis Sanatorium (now the campus of the Utah Schools for the Deaf and Blind)

== See also ==
- List of state highways in Utah
- List of highways numbered 183
