= List of highways numbered 186 =

The following highways are numbered 186:

== Ireland ==
R186 regional road

== Japan ==
- Japan National Route 186

== United Kingdom ==
- A186 road
- B186 road

== United States ==
- Alabama State Route 186
- Arizona State Route 186
- Arkansas Highway 186
- California State Route 186
- Connecticut Route 186
- Georgia State Route 186
- Illinois Route 186 (former)
- K-186 (Kansas highway)
- Kentucky Route 186
- Maine State Route 186
- Maryland Route 186
- Massachusetts Route 186
- M-186 (Michigan highway)
- New Mexico State Road 186
- New York State Route 186
- North Carolina Highway 186
- Ohio State Route 186
- South Carolina Highway 186
- Tennessee State Route 186
- Texas State Highway 186
  - Texas State Highway Spur 186
  - Farm to Market Road 186 (Texas)
- Utah State Route 186
- Virginia State Route 186
- Wisconsin Highway 186

Territories

- Forest Highway 186 (Puerto Rico)

Preceded by 185	Lists of highways 186	Succeeded by 187
