= Utah State Route 184 =

State Route 184

Location
- Country: United States
- State: Utah

Highway system
- Utah State Highway System; Interstate; US; State; Minor; Scenic
← SR-183	→ SR-185

Utah State Route 184 may refer to:

- Utah State Route 184 (1963–2007), a former state highway in Salt Lake City, Utah, United States, that formed an eastern loop off of U.S. Route 89, connecting with U.S. Route 89 at its former routing at North Temple and North State Street and again at Beck Street, via the west side of the State Capitol
- Utah State Route 184 (1935-1963), a former state highway in eastern Provo, Utah, United States, that connected State Route 1 (U.S. Route 89/U.S. Route 91), at University Avenue and Center Street, with the Utah State Hospital, via East Center Street.
- Utah State Route 184A (1940-1969), a former state highway designation for several roads that served Weber State University in Ogden, Utah, United States, that included the road around the perimeter of the camps and a (since nearly entirely removed) road that ran easterly through the campus to the stadium. (The route was renumbered as State Route 284 in 1969.)

== See also ==
- List of state highways in Utah
- List of highways numbered 184
