= Utah State Route 189 (disambiguation) =

State Route 189

Location
- Country: United States
- State: Utah

Highway system
- Utah State Highway System; Interstate; US; State; Minor; Scenic
← SR-188	→ SR-190

Utah State Route 189 may refer to:

- Utah State Route 189, the legislative overlay designation for U.S. Route 189 (US-189) within Utah, United States. By Utah State law, US-189 within the state (except concurrencies) has been defined as "State Route 189" since 1977)
- Utah State Route 189 (1935–1969), a former state highway in Ephraim, Utah, United States

== See also ==
- List of state highways in Utah
- List of U.S. Highways in Utah
- List of highways numbered 189
