= List of highways numbered 187 =

The following highways are numbered 187:

== Ireland ==
- R187 road (Ireland)

== Japan ==
- Japan National Route 187

== United Kingdom ==
- A187 road
- B187 road

== United States ==
- U.S. Route 187 (former)
- Alabama State Route 187
- Arizona State Route 187
- Arkansas Highway 187
- California State Route 187
- Colorado State Highway 187
- Connecticut Route 187
- Florida State Road 187
- Georgia State Route 187
- Hawaii Route 187
- Iowa Highway 187
- K-187 (Kansas highway)
- Kentucky Route 187
- Maine State Route 187
- Maryland Route 187
- Massachusetts Route 187
- Missouri Route 187
- Montana Highway 187 (former)
- New Jersey Route 187
- New Mexico State Road 187
- New York State Route 187
- Ohio State Route 187
- Pennsylvania Route 187
- South Carolina Highway 187
- Tennessee State Route 187
- Texas State Highway 187 (former)
  - Texas State Highway Loop 187
  - Ranch to Market Road 187 (Texas)
- Utah State Route 187 (former)
- Virginia State Route 187
- Wisconsin Highway 187

Territories

- Puerto Rico Highway 187
  - Puerto Rico Highway 187R

| Preceded by 186 | Lists of highways 187 | Succeeded by 188 |
