= List of highways numbered 184 =

The following highways are numbered 184:

== Ireland ==
- R184 road (Ireland)

== Japan ==
- Japan National Route 184

== Poland ==
- Voivodeship road 184

== United Kingdom ==
- A184 road
- B184 road

== United States ==
- Interstate 184
- Alabama State Route 184
- Arkansas Highway 184
- California State Route 184
- Colorado State Highway 184
- Connecticut Route 184
- Georgia State Route 184
- Illinois Route 184
- Iowa Highway 184 (former)
- K-184 (Kansas highway)
- Kentucky Route 184
- Louisiana Highway 184
- Maine State Route 184
- M-184 (Michigan highway) (former)
- Mississippi Highway 184
- New Jersey Route 184
- New Mexico State Road 184
- New York State Route 184
- North Carolina Highway 184
- Ohio State Route 184
- Pennsylvania Route 184
- South Carolina Highway 184
- Tennessee State Route 184
- Texas State Highway 184
  - Farm to Market Road 184 (Texas)
- Utah State Route 184 (1935-1963) in Provo
- Utah State Route 184 (1963-2007) in Salt Lake City (former)
- Virginia State Route 184
- Wisconsin Highway 184 (former)

Territories

- Puerto Rico Highway 184

Preceded by 183	Lists of highways 184	Succeeded by 185
