= Rakanzan Prefectural Natural Park =

Natural park of Yamaguchi prefecture, Japan

Coordinates: 34°21′21″N 132°4′3″E

- 羅漢山県立自然公園
- Interactive map of Rakanzan Prefectural Natural Park
- Location: Yamaguchi Prefecture, Japan
- Nearest city: Iwakuni
- Area: 38.79 km^{2} (14.98 sq mi)
- Established: 1 March 1962

Rakanzan Prefectural Natural Park (羅漢山県立自然公園, Rakanzan kenritsu shizen kōen) is a Prefectural Natural Park in eastern Yamaguchi Prefecture, Japan. Established in 1962, the park is wholly within the municipality of Iwakuni.

== See also ==
- National Parks of Japan
- Nishi-Chugoku Sanchi Quasi-National Park
