= Japan National Route 189 =

Road in Yamaguchi prefecture, Japan

National Route 189
- 国道189号

Route information
- Length: 0.4 km (0.25 mi; 1,300 ft)
- Existed: 1953–present

Major junctions
- East end: Marine Corps Air Station Iwakuni
- West end: National Route 188 in Iwakuni, Yamaguchi

Location
- Country: Japan

Highway system
- National highways of Japan; Expressways of Japan
← National Route 188	→ National Route 190

National Route 189 is a national highway of Japan in Iwakuni, Yamaguchi, connecting Marine Corps Air Station Iwakuni and Japan National Route 2, with a total length of 0.4 km (0.25 mi). (Note: In the 2013 road statistics report, it had a stated length of 2.9 km, but in the 2014 road statistics report, it had been shortened to 0.4 km.)

== Overview ==
Route 189 connects with the main gate of Marine Corps Air Station Iwakuni at the southernmost end, and with the Taiteishi intersection of Routes 2 and 188. Access to the commercial portion of Air Station Iwakuni is provided by the Yamaguchi Prefectural Route 110 Iwakuni Kintaikyo Airport Line.

While the actual length of the road is 2.9 km (1.80 mi), over 2.5 km (1.55 mi) of this overlaps with Japan National Route 188. The section of this route with no overlap is just 372 m (1,220.5 ft) long, making it the second-shortest national highway in Japan, longer than Route 174 by 185 m (607.0 ft), and shorter than Route 130 by 110 m (360.9 ft).

=== Intersecting roads ===
Intersecting roads	Intersects to	
Japan National Route 188 Overlapping section start	Kurumacho	Iwakuni Airport Entrance Intersection
Japan National Route 2 Japan National Route 187; Japan National Route 188 Overlapping section end	Japan National Route 188	Tateishi Intersection/End of Route

=== Route Data ===
Start and end points are as designated by ordinance.

- Start: Iwakuni Airport
- End: 1-Chome, Marifu, Iwakuni City
- Length: 0.4 km (0.25 mi)

== History ==
Route 189 was opened in 1953, first designated as a second class national highway named Second-class National Route 189 Iwakuni Airport Line. At that time, Iwakuni Airport and Haneda Airport were the only two international airports in western Japan, making this an important road. As US military presence increased, gradually civilian aircraft were not allowed at the airport, until in 1967 civilian operations ceased.

Until 2010 the official end-point of Route 189 lay within the US military base at Iwakuni, causing road management and maintenance issues as the general public have no access. This was due to the original designation stating that the road ended before the platform where the national flag was hoisted, inside the main gate. In 2010 this was changed, with the road now officially ending at the main gate of the base.

In 2012 civilian operations from Iwakuni airport began once again with the construction of the Iwakuni Kintaikyo Airport terminal. Despite this, Route 189 remains unchanged, leaving it useless for civilians wishing to use the airport, who instead use Yamaguchi Prefectural Route 110.
