= New Jersey Route 440 =

State highway in Hudson and Middlesex counties in New Jersey, United States

Route 440

Route information
- Maintained by NJDOT and PANYNJ
- Length: 13.33 mi (21.45 km)
- Existed: January 1, 1953–present

Middlesex County section
- Length: 5.15 mi (8.29 km)
- South end: I-95 Toll / N.J. Turnpike / I-287 / CR 514 in Edison
- Major intersections: G.S. Parkway / US 9 in Woodbridge Township; Route 35 / Route 184 / CR 501 in Perth Amboy
- North end: NY 440 in Richmond Valley, NY

Hudson County section
- Length: 8.18 mi (13.16 km)
- South end: NY 440 in Elm Park, NY
- Major intersections: I-78 Toll / Newark Bay Extension in Jersey City; Route 185 in Jersey City
- North end: US 1-9 Truck / CR 612 in Jersey City

Location
- Country: United States
- State: New Jersey
- Counties: Middlesex, Hudson

Highway system
- New Jersey State Highway Routes; Interstate; US; State; Scenic Byways
| ← Route 439 | → Route 444 |
| ← Route 168 | Route 169 | → Route 170 |

Route 440 is a state highway in New Jersey, United States. It is composed of two segments, a 5.15-mile (8.29 km) freeway in Middlesex County linking Interstate 287 (I-287) and the New Jersey Turnpike (I-95), in Edison to the Outerbridge Crossing in Perth Amboy and an 8.18-mile (13.16 km) four-lane divided highway in Hudson County running from the Bayonne Bridge in Bayonne to U.S. Route 1-9 Truck (US 1-9 Truck) in Jersey City. These two segments are connected by New York State Route 440 (NY 440), which runs across Staten Island. The freeway portion in Middlesex County is six lanes wide and intersects the Garden State Parkway and US 9 in Woodbridge Township.

What is now Route 440 was designated as two different routes in 1927: the Middlesex County portion between Route 4 (now Route 35) and the proposed Outerbridge Crossing was designated Route S4 (a spur of Route 4) while the Hudson County portion was designated as a part of Route 1. In 1953, Route 440 replaced Route S4 as well as Route 1 south of Communipaw Avenue; the number was chosen to match NY 440 (The portion on Route 1 was briefly planned to become Route 61 instead). A freeway was built for the route in Middlesex County between 1967 and finished in 1972. A freeway was also proposed for the route in Hudson County to fill in the gap between the Bayonne Bridge and West 63rd Street; however, it was never built. In 2001, Route 440 replaced Route 169 along the Bayonne waterfront.

== Route description ==
=== Middlesex County ===
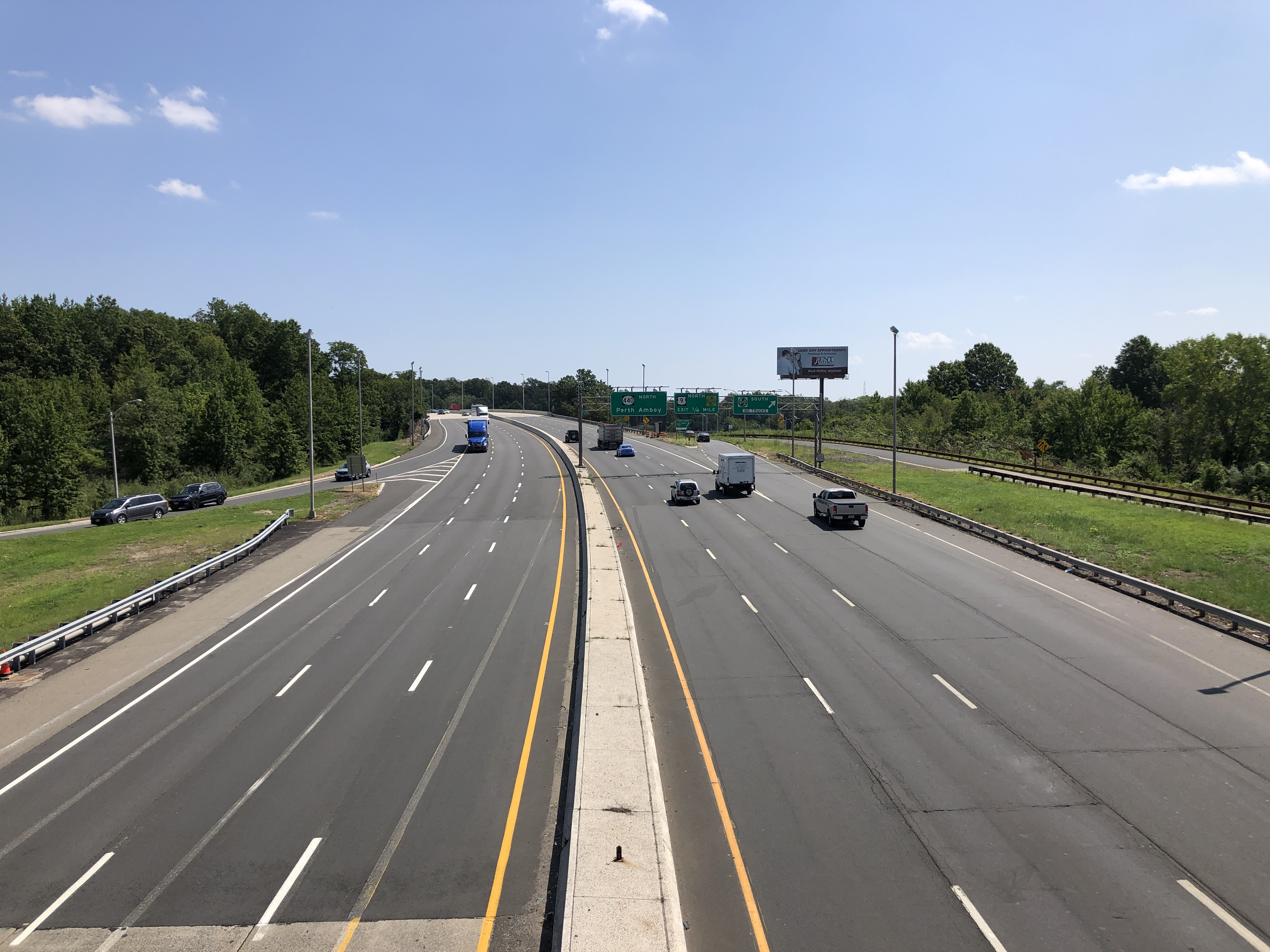
View north along Route 440 at Garden State Parkway and US 9 in Woodbridge Township

Route 440 begins in Edison at an interchange with the southern terminus of I-287 and the New Jersey Turnpike (I-95); from Route 440's southern terminus, the road becomes northbound I-287. Within this interchange, Route 440 also has access to County Route 514 (CR 514). It continues to the east as a six-lane freeway through wooded surroundings and enters Woodbridge Township at the underpass of King Georges Post Road. Here, the route intersects Smith Street (CR 656) before intersecting the Garden State Parkway and US 9 at a large interchange. Within this interchange, the route passes under Conrail Shared Assets Operations' (CSAO) Raritan Industrial Track line. From here, the route turns northeast and passes under CSAO's Perth Amboy Running Track line before it enters Perth Amboy at the point where it crosses under New Brunswick Avenue (CR 616). Route 440 passes near homes before coming to the next interchange for CR 501 and Route 184. At this point, CR 501 joins Route 440 to run concurrently, and the freeway comes to an interchange with Route 35 a short distance later. The route continues east-southeast, with an exit for Amboy Avenue (CR 653) before it passes through more residential neighborhoods. The final exit on the Middlesex County portion of Route 440 serves State Street (CR 611). Past this interchange, Route 440 becomes the Outerbridge Crossing, a four-lane bridge maintained by the Port Authority of New York and New Jersey (PANYNJ). It passes over NJ Transit’s North Jersey Coast Line and State Street before crossing over the Arthur Kill onto Staten Island. At the New Jersey-New York state line on the middle of the bridge, the southern segments of Route 440 and CR 501 end and become NY 440. An extension of Route 440 also intersects with Route 35 right after the Victory Bridge crossing in Perth Amboy (around ShopRite)

=== Hudson County ===
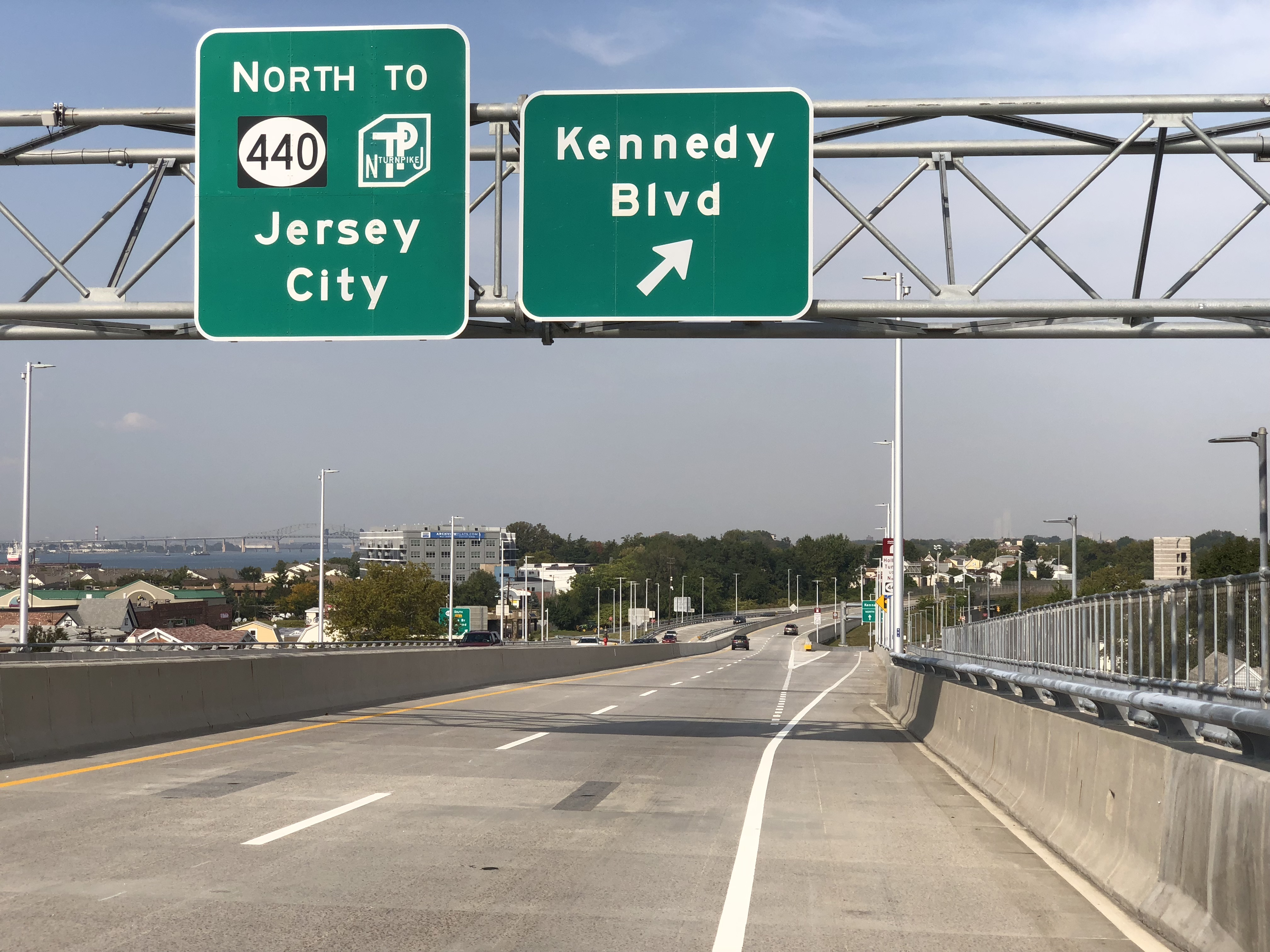
Route 440 northbound at Kennedy Boulevard (CR 501) in Bayonne

After NY 440 runs 12.73 miles (20.49 km) through Staten Island, it enters New Jersey again via the Bayonne Bridge, a four-lane bridge over Kill Van Kull that is also maintained by the PANYNJ. Upon entering Bayonne in Hudson County, the road becomes the northern segment of Route 440 and CR 501 and continues north into residential sections of the city. Continuing north as a four-lane freeway maintained by the New Jersey Department of Transportation (NJDOT), CR 501 splits from the route by heading north on Kennedy Boulevard at an interchange. Meanwhile, Route 440 turns to the east, with CSAO's Avenue A Industrial Track and NJ Transit's Hudson–Bergen Light Rail line parallel to the north, before heading northeast and passing through industrial areas as a four-lane arterial road, crossing under a CSAO railroad line. It heads north-northeast as it passes between neighborhoods and the parallel CSAO Bayonne Industrial Track and NJ Transit's Hudson–Bergen Light Rail lines to the west and port areas to the east, including the former Military Ocean Terminal.

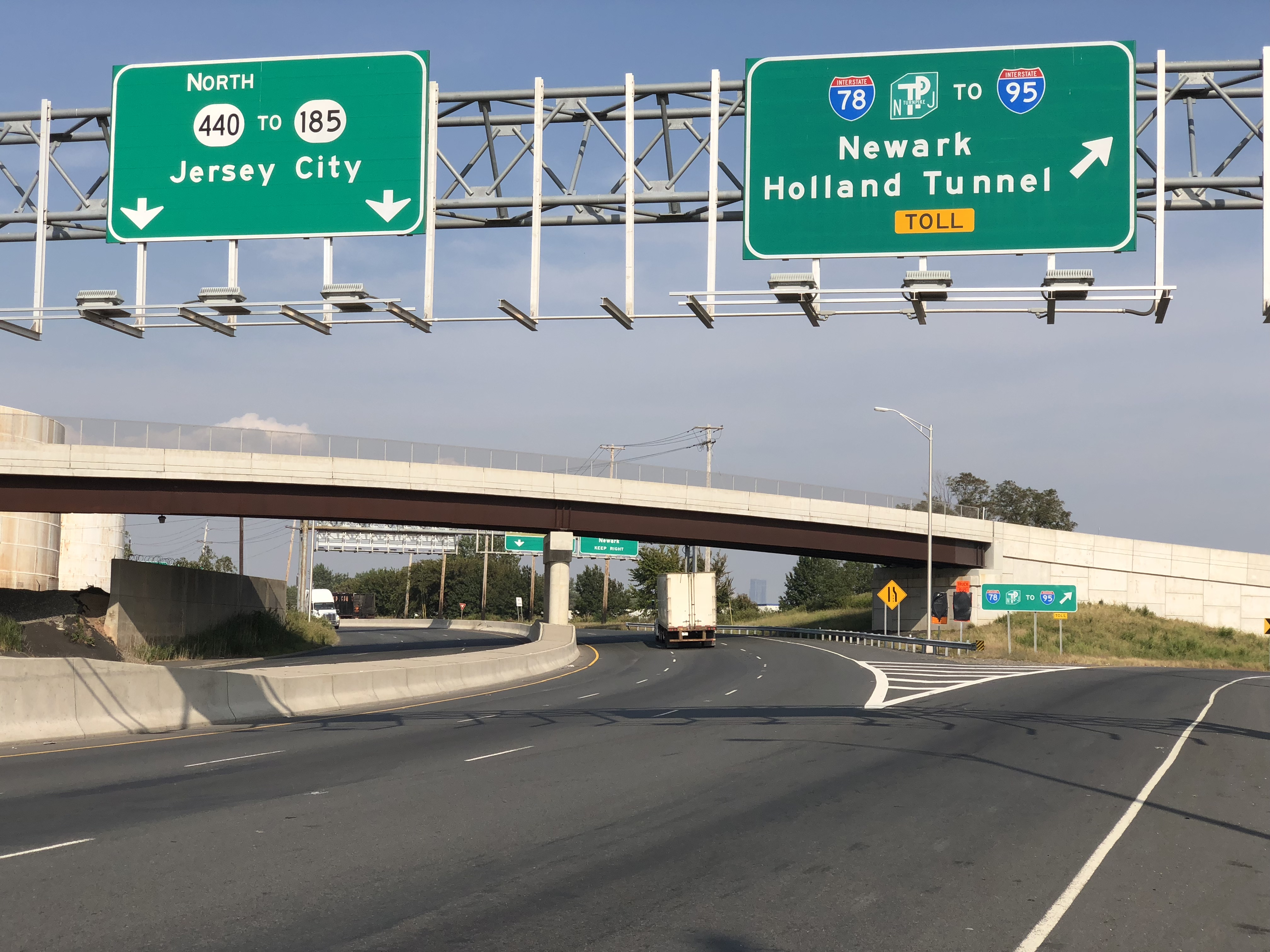
Route 440 northbound at I-78 in Jersey City

The route becomes a freeway again before crossing into Jersey City, where it comes to an interchange with the Newark Bay Extension of the New Jersey Turnpike (I-78) that provides access to the Jersey City and Hoboken waterfronts and the Holland Tunnel. Following this, Route 440 reaches an interchange with the southern terminus of Route 185. Here, the mainline becomes Route 185, and Route 440 exits onto another four-lane expressway. From here, Route 440 continues northwest, crossing under I-78 and passing over CSAO's Bayonne Industrial Track and NJ Transit's Hudson–Bergen Light Rail lines before closely paralleling the north side of I-78 and the south side of CSAO's National Docks Branch line. The route intersects Avenue C before reentering Bayonne and crossing over Kennedy Boulevard (CR 501) without an interchange. Past this intersection, Route 440 makes a sharp turn to the south and passes under the Newark Bay Bridge (I-78). After making a hairpin turn back to the north, it passes under the Newark Bay Bridge another time and runs along the eastern shore of Newark Bay, crossing under CSAO's National Docks Branch line. The route intersects West 63rd Street before crossing back into Jersey City and passing residences to the east. Route 440 becomes reverts to an arterial road before intersecting with Danforth Avenue (CR 602) as the road heads into business sectors farther to the east of Newark Bay. The road heads past industrial establishments before running through commercial areas again, passing to the east of the Hudson Mall. Route 440 ends at an intersection with US 1-9 Truck and Communipaw Avenue (CR 612), where the road continues north as part of US 1-9 Truck.

== History ==
Route S4
- Location: Perth Amboy
- Existed: 1927–1953

In the 1927 New Jersey state highway renumbering, what is now Route 440 was defined as two separate routes. The Middlesex County portion from Route 4 (now Route 35) to the present location of the Outerbridge Crossing was legislated as Route S4, a spur of Route 4. Meanwhile, the Hudson County portion of the route was legislated as a part of Route 1, a route that was to run from Bayonne to the New York border in Rockleigh. Route S4 was eventually extended west to the Garden State Parkway. This route followed Pfeiffer Boulevard and the one-way pair of Lawrence Avenue and Grove Street. Meanwhile, Route 1 only existed as a state-maintained highway north of West 63rd Street in Bayonne; south of there, traffic used Hudson Boulevard to access the Bayonne Bridge. A road carrying Route 1 was proposed to be built on landfill in the Passaic River; however, it was never constructed. In the 1953 New Jersey state highway renumbering, both Route S4 between the Garden State Parkway and the Outerbridge Crossing as well as Route 1 between West 63rd Street and Communipaw Avenue became Route 440 in order to match NY 440.

Route 169
- Location: Bayonne
- Existed: 1957–2001

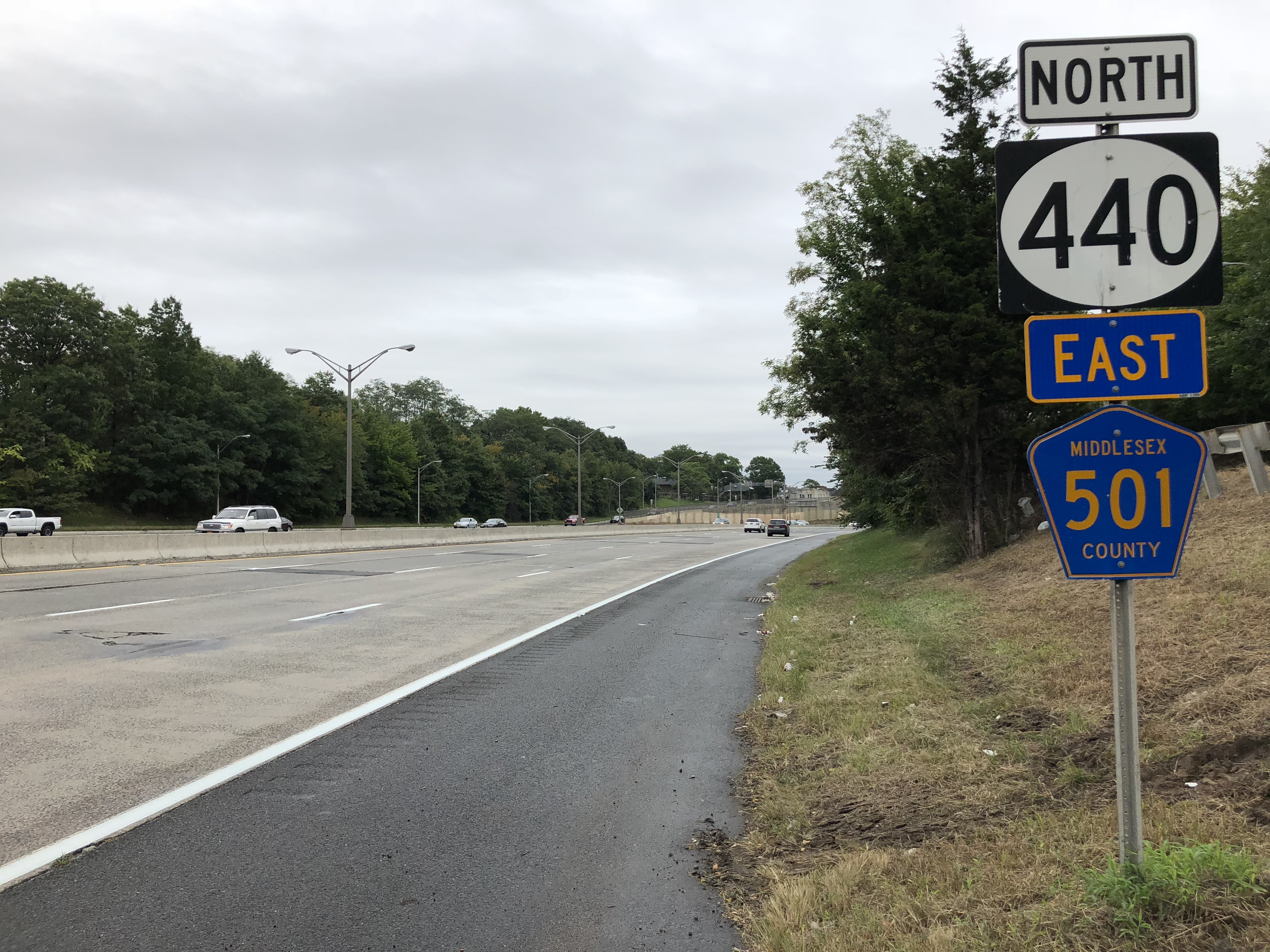
Route 440 signed with CR 501 in Perth Amboy

In 1959, an additional piece of Route 440 was legislated to run from the Bayonne Bridge to 63rd Street to complete the route, running over the waters of the Newark Bay; this was never built. In the mid-1950s, a freeway alignment was proposed for Route 440 in Middlesex County. This route, to be called the Middlesex Freeway, was to connect the New Jersey Turnpike and I-287 to the Outerbridge Crossing. Construction began on the freeway in 1967 and it was completed in 1974. The old alignment of Route 440 along Pfeiffer Boulevard between the Garden State Parkway and Route 35 became Route 184. A freeway was also proposed in the 1960s for Route 440 in Hudson County connecting the Bayonne Bridge to I-78 and filling in the gap in the route. In 1976, Route 440 was proposed along with Route 169 in a plan to redevelop the waterfront area of Bayonne. However, NJDOT shelved the project a year later due to low traffic volumes and feared environmental impact to the Newark Bay. Route 169 was later constructed as a four-lane arterial completed in 1992. In 2001, Route 169 was redesignated as Route 440 in order to complete the gap in the route.

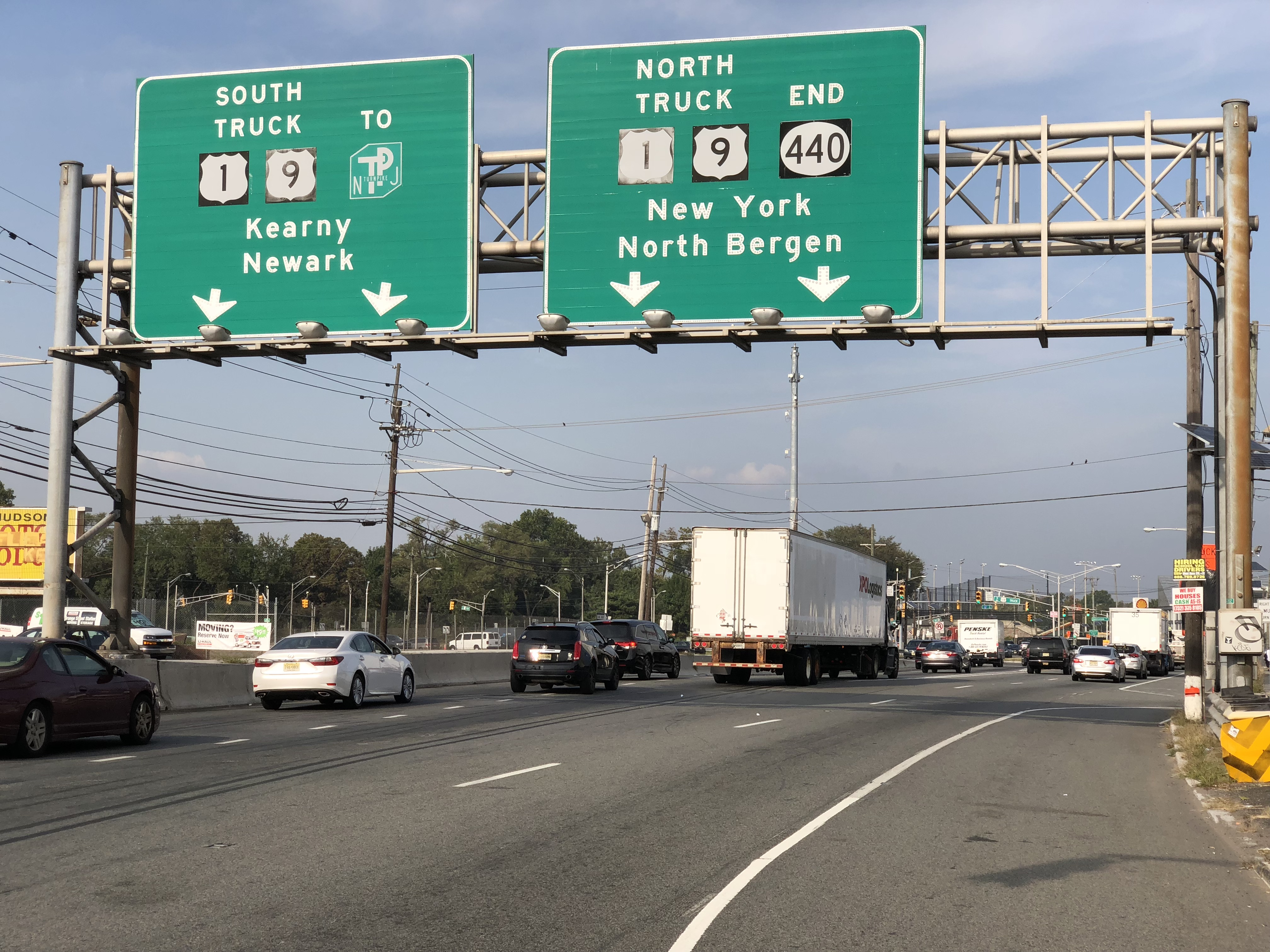
The north end of Route 440 at US 1-9 Truck in Jersey City

On January 8, 2008, Gov. Jon Corzine announced plans for a new 35-cent toll on the Middlesex County portion of Route US 1/9 440, in addition to increases on existing toll roads, to help raise funds to reduce New Jersey's outstanding debt. However, he dropped the idea to toll Route 440 a month later after mounting opposition to the idea. Between 2015 and 2018 the New Jersey Turnpike Authority reconstructed exit 14A between I-78 and Route . Construction began in 2017 to replace the overpass carrying Route 440 over the Garden State Parkway and US US 1/9 9 and it was completed in 2019.

In anticipation of a general increase of activity in the Port of New York and New Jersey and new development on West Side and Hackensack Riverfront in Jersey City, studies are being conducted to transform the roadway into a multi-use urban boulevard that would include possible grade separations, medians, and a new traffic circle at its northern terminus.

By Joint Resolution No. 4, approved July 3, 1997, the New Jersey Legislature designated the portion of Route 440 in the city of Perth Amboy as the Edward J. Patten Memorial Highway. Democrat Edward J. Patten, a former Mayor of Perth Amboy, New Jersey, later served as Secretary of State of New Jersey and represented New Jersey's 15th congressional district in the United States House of Representatives.

== Major intersections ==
| County | Location | mi | km | Destinations | Notes |
|---|---|---|---|---|---|
| Middlesex | Edison | 0.00 | 0.00 | I-287 north – Morristown, Mahwah | Continuation north |
| Middlesex | Edison | 0.33 | 0.53 | I-95 Toll / N.J. Turnpike CR 514 – Woodbridge Township, Bonhamtown, Raritan Center | No northbound access to CR 514; exit 10 on I-95 / Turnpike |
| Middlesex | Woodbridge Township | 1.46 | 2.35 | Smith Street / Riverside Drive – Fords | Northbound exit and southbound entrance; access via CR 656 |
| Middlesex | Woodbridge Township | 2.01– 2.05 | 3.23– 3.30 | US 9 south G.S. Parkway south | Exit 127 on Garden State Parkway |
| Middlesex | Woodbridge Township | 2.01– 2.05 | 3.23– 3.30 | US 9 north to G.S. Parkway north Smith Street – Downtown Perth Amboy | No southbound exit; access via CR 656 |
| Middlesex | Woodbridge Township | 2.27 | 3.65 | Riverside Drive – Raritan Center | Southbound exit only |
| Middlesex | Woodbridge Township | 2.66 | 4.28 | New Brunswick Avenue – Woodbridge Township | Southbound exit and northbound entrance; access via CR 616 |
| Middlesex | Perth Amboy | 3.41 | 5.49 | Route 35 / Route 184 west (Pfeiffer Boulevard) to G.S. Parkway north – Perth Amboy | Southern end of CR 501 concurrency; no eastbound access to Route 184; southbound access to Route 35 north is via the Amboy Avenue exit |
| Middlesex | Perth Amboy | 3.68 | 5.92 | Amboy Avenue to Route 35 north / Route 440 north – (U-turn) | Northbound access is via the Route 184 exit; access via CR 653 |
| Middlesex | Perth Amboy | 4.26 | 6.86 | State Street / High Street – Perth Amboy | Northbound exit and southbound entrance; last northbound exit before toll; access via CR 611 |
| Arthur Kill | | 4.48 | 7.21 | Outerbridge Crossing (northbound toll on Staten Island) | |
| Arthur Kill | | 5.15 | 8.29 | NY 440 north to Korean War Veterans Parkway north – Staten Island | Continuation into New York |
Connection made via NY 440 (12.73 mi or 20.49 km)
| Kill van Kull | | 18.00 | 28.97 | NY 440 south to I-278 – Staten Island | Continuation into New York |
| Kill van Kull | | 18.39 | 29.60 | Bayonne Bridge (southbound toll on Staten Island) | |
| Hudson | Bayonne | 18.83 | 30.30 | Avenue A | Southbound exit and entrance; last southbound exit before toll |
| Hudson | Bayonne | 18.91 | 30.43 | Kennedy Boulevard (CR 501) | Northern end of CR 501 concurrency; no southbound exit |
| Hudson | Bayonne | 19.72 | 31.74 | Northern end of freeway section | |
| Hudson | Bayonne | 21.22 | 34.15 | Southern end of limited-access section | |
| Hudson | Jersey City | 21.99 | 35.39 | I-78 Toll / Newark Bay Extension / Pulaski Street to I-95 Toll / N.J. Turnpike – Newark, Holland Tunnel, Port Jersey | Exit 14A on I-78 / Turnpike |
| Hudson | Jersey City | 22.22 | 35.76 | Route 185 north to Linden Avenue – Liberty State Park | Southern terminus of Route 185 |
| Hudson | Jersey City | 22.96 | 36.95 | Avenue C, Garfield Avenue | |
| Hudson | Jersey City | | | Northern end of freeway section | |
| Hudson | Jersey City | 26.18 | 42.13 | US 1-9 Truck south to I-95 Toll / N.J. Turnpike – Kearny, Newark US 1-9 Truck north – New York, North Bergen Communipaw Avenue (CR 612 east) | Northern terminus |
1.000 mi = 1.609 km; 1.000 km = 0.621 mi: Concurrency terminus; Incomplete access; Tolled
