= List of highways numbered 189 =

The following highways are numbered 189:

== Japan ==
- Japan National Route 189

== United Kingdom ==
- A189 road
- B189 road

== United States ==
- Interstate 189
- U.S. Route 189
- Alabama State Route 189
- Arizona State Route 189
- California State Route 189
- Connecticut Route 189
- Florida State Road 189
- Georgia State Route 189
- K-189 (Kansas highway)
- Kentucky Route 189
- Maine State Route 189
- Maryland Route 189
- Massachusetts Route 189
- M-189 (Michigan highway)
- New Mexico State Road 189
- New York State Route 189
- Ohio State Route 189
- Pennsylvania Route 189 (former)
- Tennessee State Route 189
- Texas State Highway 189 (former)
  - Ranch to Market Road 189 (Texas)
- Utah State Route 189 (former)
- Virginia State Route 189
- Wisconsin Highway 189 (former)

Territories:

- Puerto Rico Highway 189

Preceded by 188	Lists of highways 189	Succeeded by 190
