= New Jersey Route 185 =

State highway in New Jersey, US

Route 185

Route information
- Maintained by NJDOT
- Length: 0.65 mi (1,050 m)
- Existed: February 25, 1988–present

Major junctions
- South end: I-78 Toll / Newark Bay Extension / Route 440 in Jersey City
- North end: Linden Avenue in Jersey City

Location
- Country: United States
- State: New Jersey
- Counties: Hudson

Highway system
- New Jersey State Highway Routes; Interstate; US; State; Scenic Byways
← Route 184	→ Route 187

Route 185 is a short expressway in Jersey City in the U.S. state of New Jersey, between Route 440 and Linden Avenue. Route 185 is a 0.65-mile (1.05 km) freeway in the Greenville neighborhood of Jersey City. It is parallel to Interstate 78 (the Newark Bay Extension of the New Jersey Turnpike) on the eastern side. On Route 440, signs pointing the way to Route 185 imply that the highway runs directly to Liberty State Park. In reality, the freeway ends at Linden Avenue, and travelers must journey one city block west to Caven Point Road, which continues north to Liberty State Park. Route 185 opened on February 25, 1988, at only 23% of its proposed routing.

== Route description ==
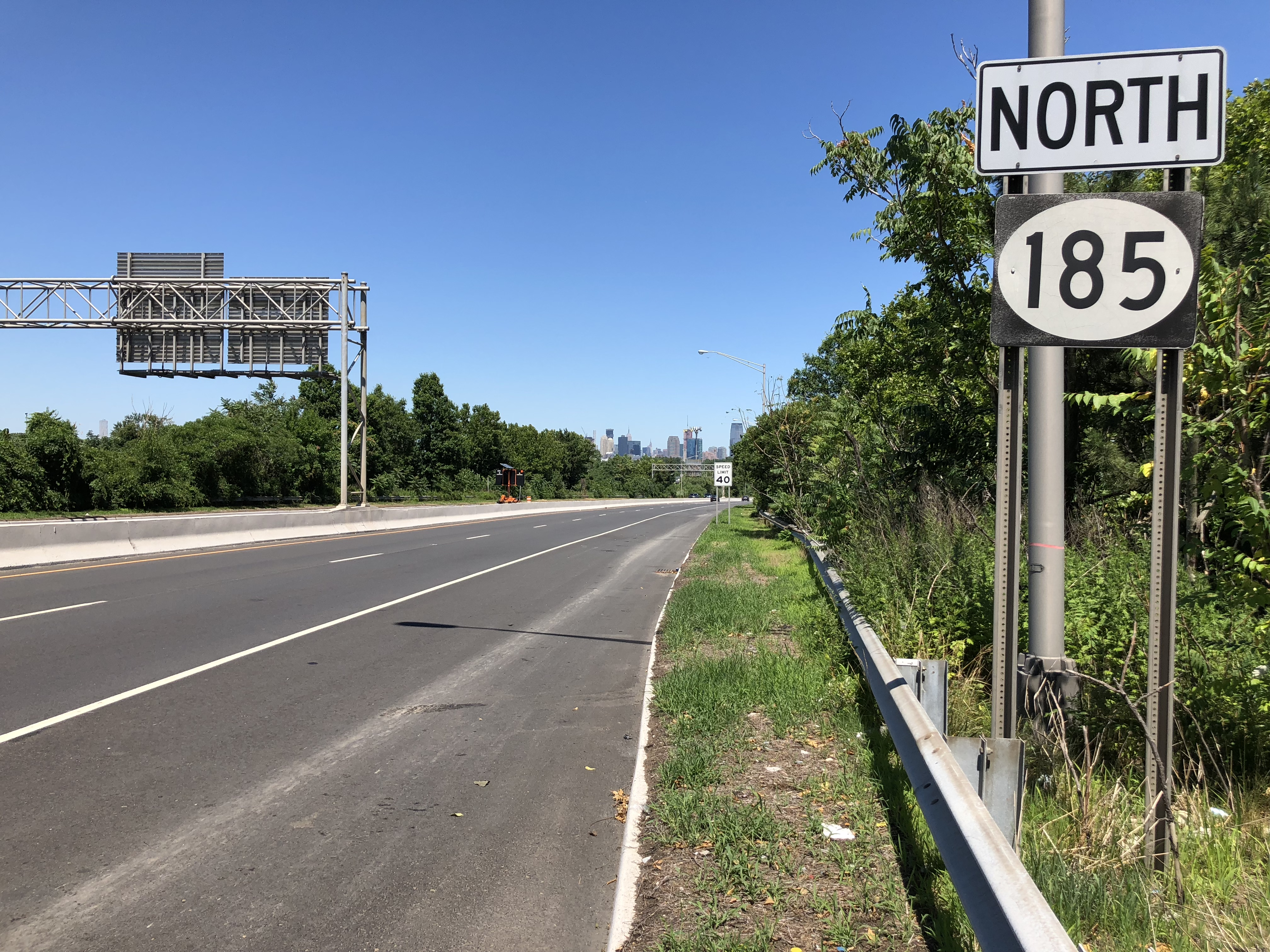
View north along Route 185 just north of Route 440 in Jersey City

Route 185 begins at a trumpet interchange with Route 440 and Harbor Drive in Jersey City. The route heads northward, surrounded by the northbound and southbound lanes of Route 440. Route 185 parallels Summit Place and interchanges once again with Route 440. After the interchange on and off ramps, the highway continues into the industrial area of Jersey City, passing over the former Central Railroad of New Jersey alignment and near the Greenville Railroad Yard. Route 185 parallels the New Jersey Turnpike Newark Bay Extension (I-78) from this point on, until the designation terminates at an at-grade intersection with Linden Avenue East on Upper New York Bay.

== History ==
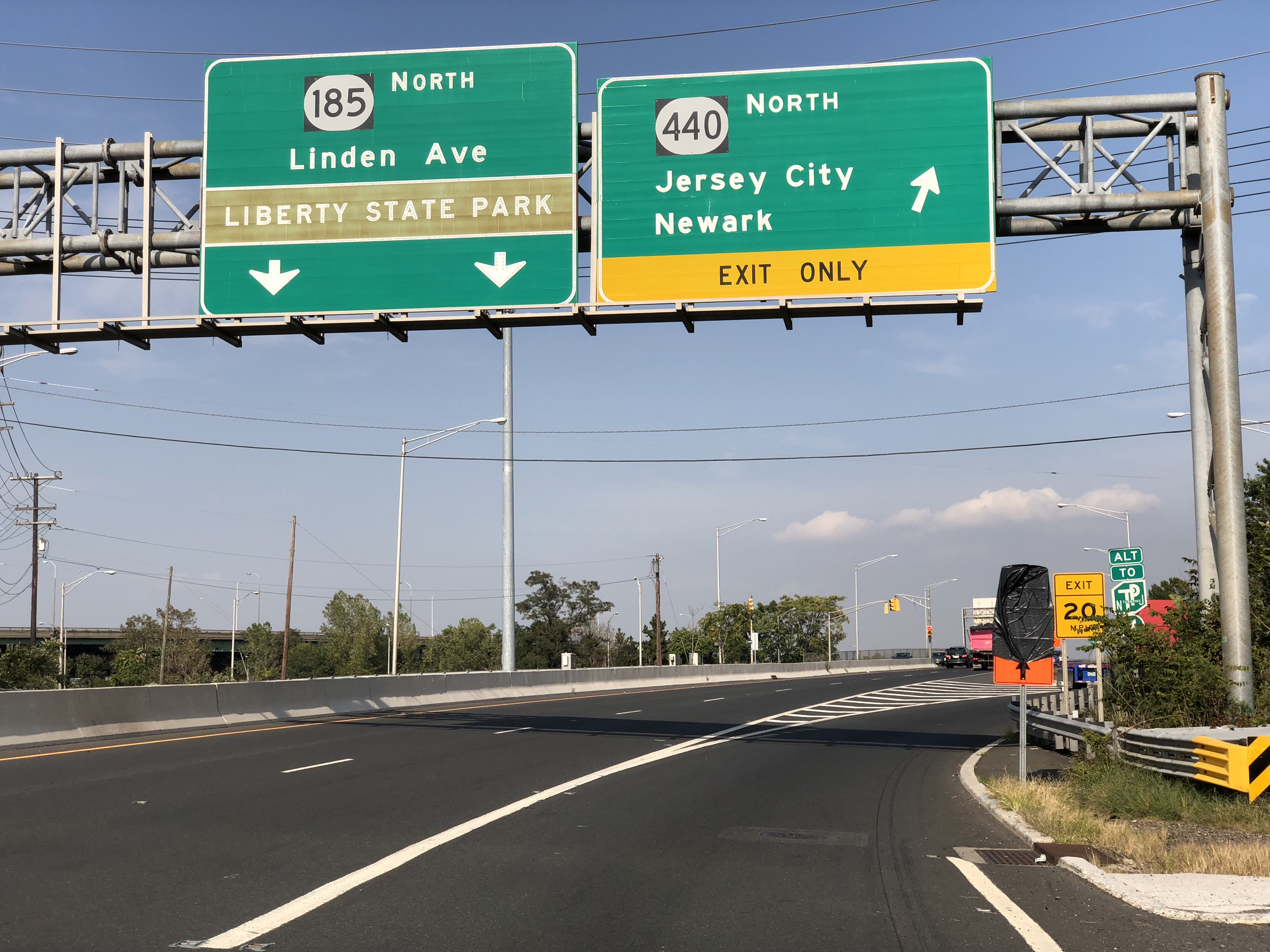
The south end of Route 185 at Route 440 in Jersey City

=== Arterial design ===
The alignment of Route 185 originates as Alternative F-1 and G-1 of the Liberty Harbor–Route 169 Feeder Arterial, proposed in 1977 during the construction of New Jersey Route 169. The alignment was supposed to fork off of Route 169 near Interchange 14A on the Newark Bay Extension, and parallel the extension through the Greenville Railroad Yards. The alignment would parallel Caven Point Road to the south and through the Metropolitan Tank Port before ending at Interchange 14B in Jersey City. The original alignment proposed, Alternative G-4, was to have the freeway run along the alignment of Caven Point Road parallel to the Newark Bay Extension into the Metropolitan Tank Port, but prior to the Final Environmental Impact Statement, the proposal was dropped. The alignment was designed to help serve existing and proposed industry and divert truck traffic from local streets. The alignment of the new arterial was proposed to be 2.75 miles (4.43 km) with four travel lanes (two in each direction) designed for hourly volume of 3090 vehicles.

Although most of the arterial was proposed as an at-grade highway, the interchange with Route 169 was to be configured so the highway could pass over the Greenville Railroad Yard on a viaduct. The right-of-way for the new Liberty Harbor arterial would be 110 feet (34 m) wide and terminate at Interchange 14B, although there was the possibility of turning it into the new Hudson River Route, a project being studied by the New Jersey Department of Transportation (NJDOT).

=== Construction and recent history ===
Route 185 was first conceived by the state legislature in 1976, when an addition to the state statutes was passed for a route from Harbor Drive to an intersection with Bayview Avenue in Jersey City. The law passed on July 22, 1976, and the original highway had no designation. The route opened on February 25, 1988, from Route 169 (now Route 440) to an intersection with Linden Avenue, only 23% of its proposed alignment. In 1996, Conti Enterprises was hired for a construction project involving Route 169 and Route 185. Along with the widening of Route 169 to four lanes, this also involved getting acceleration lanes on Route 185 for drivers heading towards Upper New York Bay.

In September 2008, NJDOT brought up the possibility of extending Route 185 to Bayview Avenue from its current northern terminus at Linden Avenue. Previous studies have said Route 185 could be extended, or the reverse with the Linden Avenue jog at Liberty State Park be removed. No future plans have been set yet for this truck-efficient plan.

== Exit list ==
The entire route is in Jersey City, Hudson County. All exits are unnumbered.

mi	km	Destinations	Notes
0.00	0.00	I-78 Toll / Newark Bay Extension / Route 440 south – Port Jersey, Bayonne Bridge	Southern terminus; exit 14A on I-78 / Turnpike
0.12	0.19	Route 440 north – Newark, New York City	Southbound exit and northbound entrance
0.65	1.05	Linden Avenue – Liberty State Park, Claremont Terminal	Northern terminus; at-grade intersection
1.000 mi = 1.609 km; 1.000 km = 0.621 mi: Incomplete access
