= New Jersey Route 184 =

State highway in Middlesex County, New Jersey, United States

Route 184

Route information
- Maintained by New Jersey Department of Transportation
- Length: 1.37 mi (2.20 km)
- Existed: 1974–present

Major junctions
- West end: CR 501 in Woodbridge
- US 9 in Woodbridge
- East end: Route 35 / Route 440 / CR 501 in Perth Amboy

Location
- Country: United States
- State: New Jersey
- Counties: Middlesex

Highway system
- New Jersey State Highway Routes; Interstate; US; State; Scenic Byways
← Route 183	→ Route 185

Route 184 is a state highway in New Jersey, United States. It is an old section of Route 440 that was rerouted. Route 184's western end is at an intersection with the Garden State Parkway in Woodbridge Township; its eastern end is at an intersection with Route 35 in Perth Amboy. The highway passes several local landmarks along the highway, but is less populated than the surrounding area. Except for the easternmost section between Route 35 and Route 440, the highway is concurrent with County Route 501, but is not county-maintained.

The route originated as Route S4, which became Route 440 on January 1, 1953. In 1974, a part of Route 440 was bypassed and rerouted, and the New Jersey State Highway Department reassigned the former alignment as Route 184.

== Route description ==
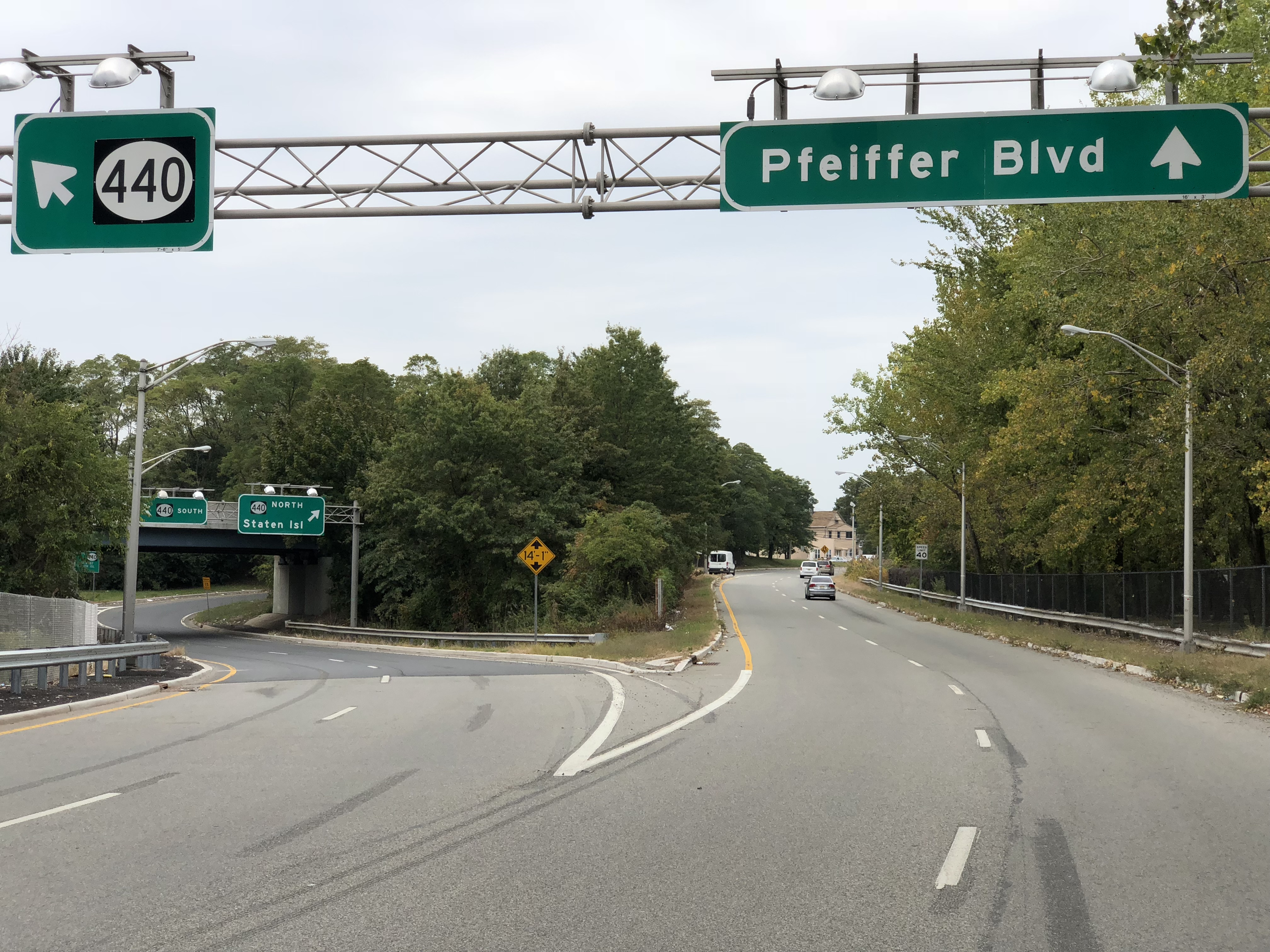
Route 184 heading into the interchange with Route 440 and Pfeiffer Boulevard

Route 184 begins at an interchange with the Garden State Parkway's exit 129 and County Route 501 (CR 501) in Woodbridge Township. The route, immediately concurrent with CR 501 is known as King Georges Road, which turns to the north near Fords Park. Just after the split from King Georges Road, Route 184 enters a partial cloverleaf interchange with US 9 and passes south of Hopelawn Park. After passing the local cemetery, the route crosses a junction with CR 655 (Florida Grove Road). Continuing east, the route becomes known as Pfieffer Boulevard and crosses an interchange with Route 440 in Perth Amboy.

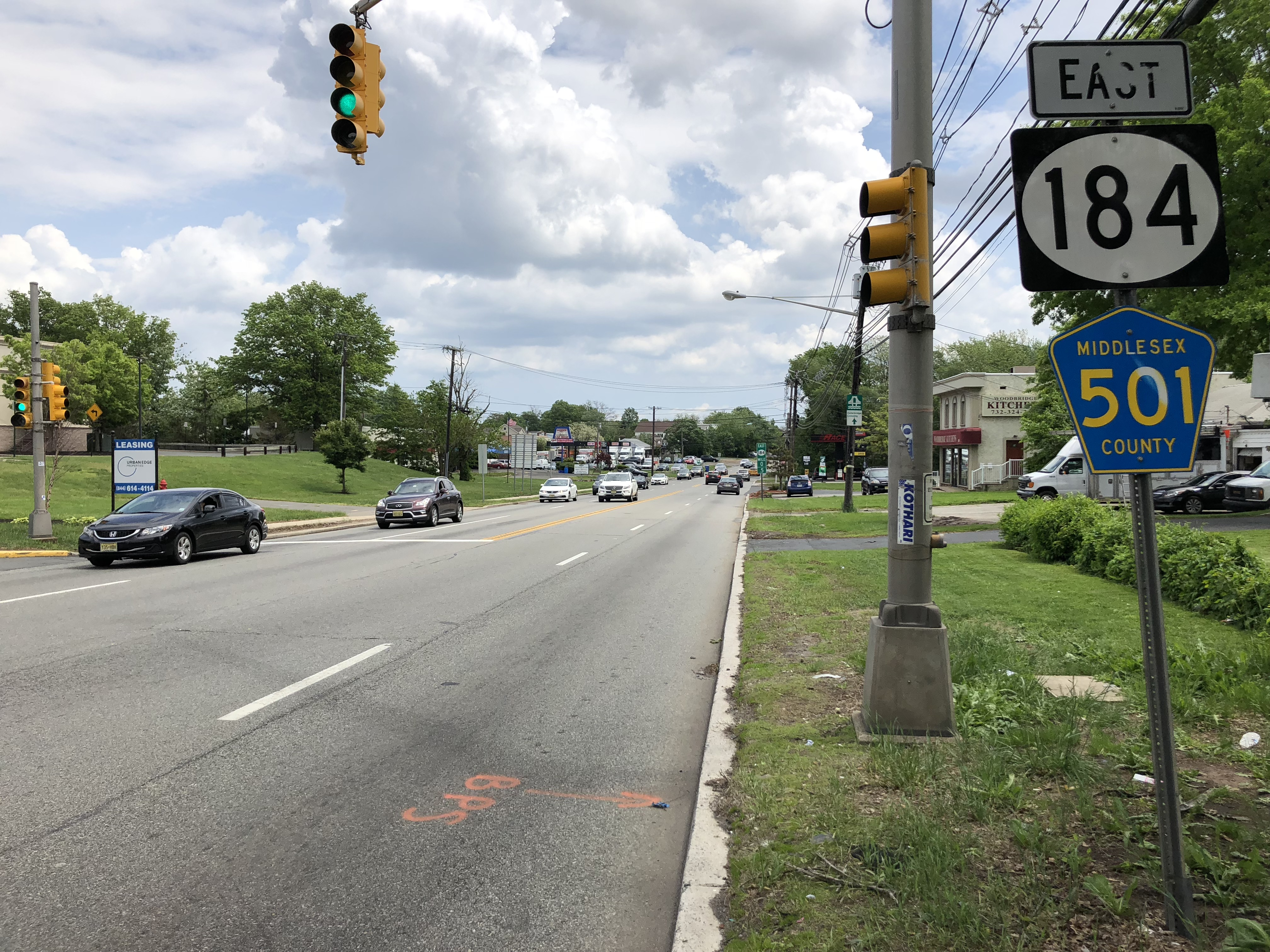
View east along Route 184 and CR 501 just east of Route 9 in Woodbridge

Just east of Route 440, the route continues northward until reaching an intersection with Route 35 (Convery Boulevard), marking the eastern terminus of Route 184.

== History ==
Route 184 originated as a prefixed spur of Route 4 (currently an alignment of U.S. Route 9), New Jersey State Highway Route S-4, first defined in 1927. The highway was an alignment from the new Outerbridge Crossing to Route 4. It was eventually extended from Route 4 to the recently built Route 4 Parkway (now the Garden State Parkway) in 1951. In the 1953 renumbering on January 1, 1953, Route S-4 was decommissioned and renumbered to Route 440 to match up with New York State Route 440 in Staten Island.

== Major intersections ==
The entire route is in Middlesex County.

Location	mi	km	Destinations	Notes
Woodbridge	0.00	0.00	CR 501 west (King Georges Post Road)	Continuation west; western end of CR 501 concurrency
Woodbridge	0.11	0.18	To I-95 Toll / N.J. Turnpike / G.S. Parkway north	Partial cloverleaf interchange
Woodbridge	0.34	0.55	US 9 – Rahway, South Amboy	Partial cloverleaf interchange
Perth Amboy	1.19	1.92	Route 440 north / CR 501 east – Outerbridge Crossing	Interchange; eastern end of CR 501 concurrency
Perth Amboy	1.37	2.20	Route 35 (Convery Boulevard)	Eastern terminus
1.000 mi = 1.609 km; 1.000 km = 0.621 mi: Concurrency terminus
