= State Highway 188 (Andhra Pradesh) =

Road in Andhra Pradesh, India

State Highway 188 is a state highway in Andhra Pradesh, India. It passes through Chittoor, Yadamari, Gudiyatham, and Pernambut, connecting the Chittoor district. It is 146 kilometres (91 mi) long.

== See also ==
- List of state highways in Andhra Pradesh
