= Interstate 185 =

Interstate 185 may refer to:

- Interstate 185 (Georgia), a spur to Columbus, Georgia
- Interstate 185 (South Carolina), a spur in Greenville, South Carolina
