= New York State Route 188 =

New York State Route 188 may refer to:

- New York State Route 188 (1930–1939) in Franklin County
- New York State Route 188 (1969–1970) in Tioga and Broome Counties
