= Japan National Route 186 =

Road in Japan

National Route 186
- 国道186号
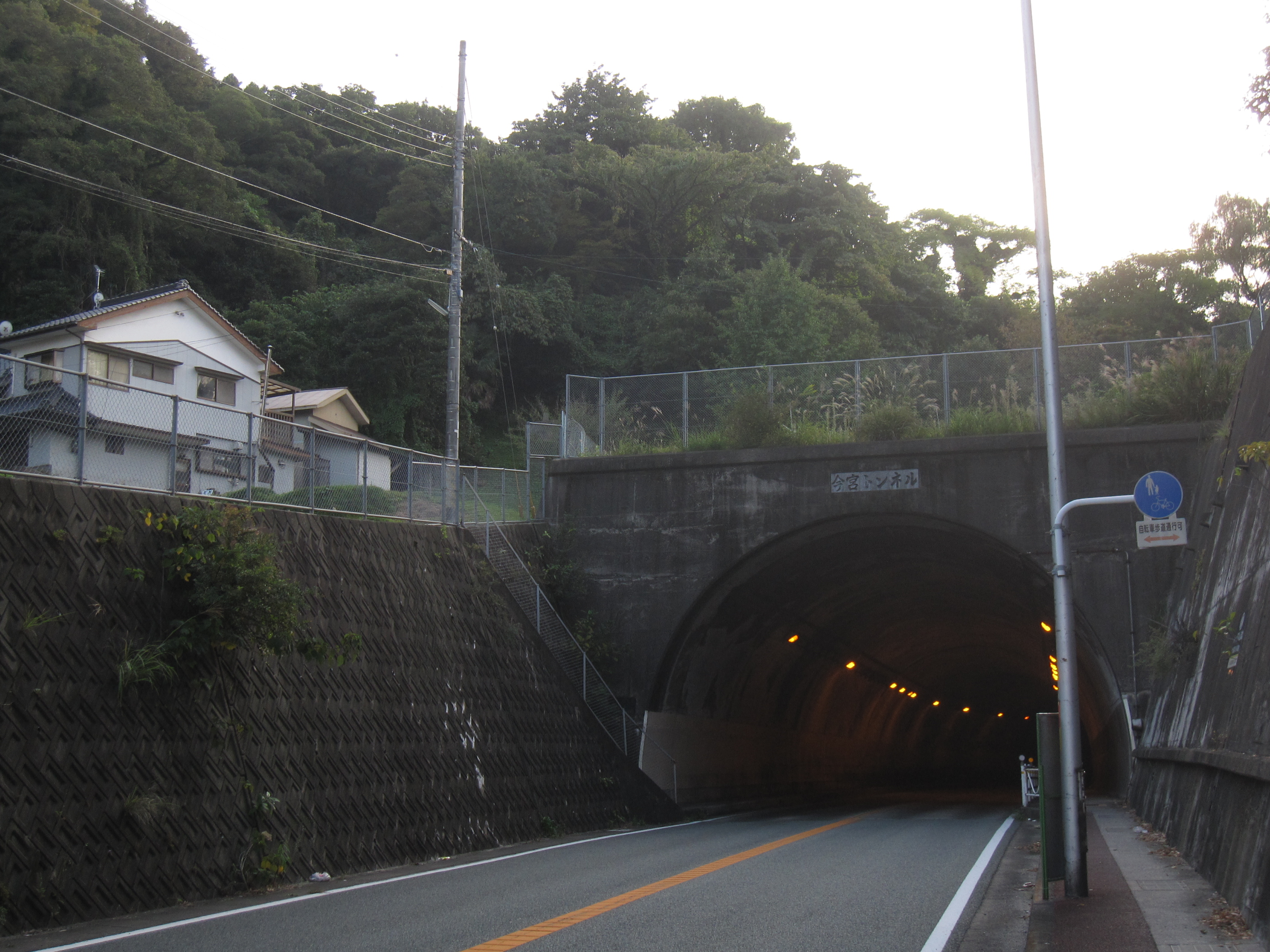

Route information
- Length: 145.5 km (90.4 mi)
- Existed: 18 May 1953–present

Major junctions
- North end: National Route 9 in Gōtsu
- South end: National Route 2 in Ōtake

Location
- Country: Japan

Highway system
- National highways of Japan; Expressways of Japan
← National Route 185	→ National Route 187

National Route 186 is a national highway of Japan connecting Gōtsu, Shimane and Ōtake, Hiroshima in Japan, with a total length of 145.5 km (90.41 mi).
