= List of highways numbered 183 =

The following highways are numbered 183:

== India ==
- National Highway 183 (India)

== Ireland ==
- R183 road (Ireland)

== Japan ==
- Japan National Route 183

== United Kingdom ==
- A183 road
- B183 road

== United States ==
- U.S. Route 183
- Alabama State Route 183
- Arkansas Highway 183
- California State Route 183
- Colorado State Highway 183
- Connecticut Route 183
- Florida State Road 183 (former)
- Georgia State Route 183
- Illinois Route 183
- Iowa Highway 183
- Kentucky Route 183
- Louisiana Highway 183
- Maine State Route 183
- Maryland Route 183 (former)
- Massachusetts Route 183
- M-183 (Michigan highway)
- New Jersey Route 183
- New Mexico State Road 183
- New York State Route 183
- North Carolina Highway 183
- Ohio State Route 183
- Pennsylvania Route 183
- South Carolina Highway 183
- Tennessee State Route 183
- Texas State Highway 183
  - Texas State Highway Spur 183
  - Farm to Market Road 183 (Texas)
- Utah State Route 183 (former)
- Virginia State Route 183
- Wisconsin Highway 183

Territories:

- Puerto Rico Highway 183

Preceded by 182	Lists of highways 183	Succeeded by 184
