= Japan National Route 188 =

National highway in Japan

National Route 188
- 国道188号
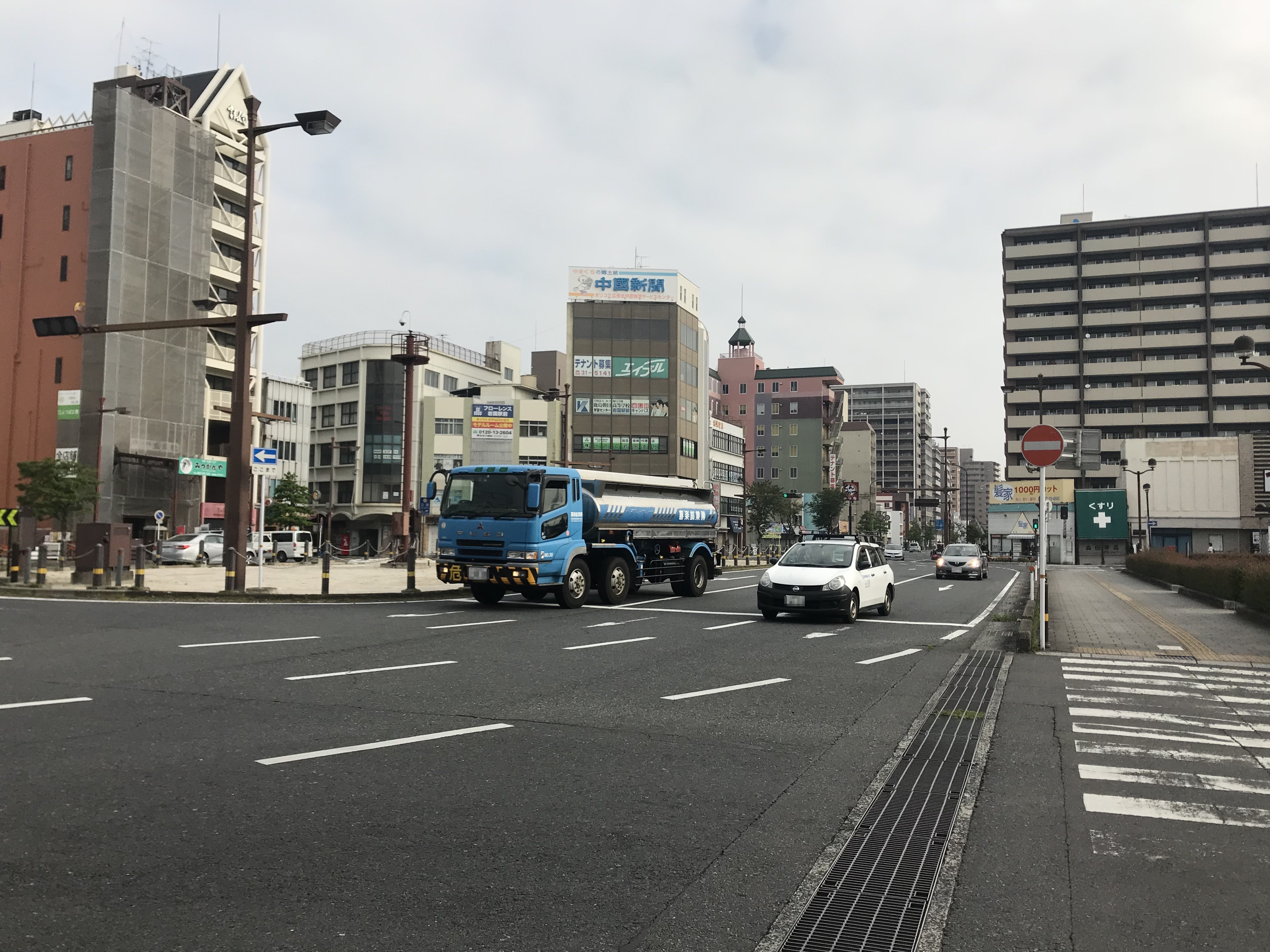

Route information
- Length: 67.7 km (42.1 mi)
- Existed: 18 May 1953–present

Major junctions
- North end: National Route 2 in Iwakuni
- South end: National Route 2 in Kudamatsu

Location
- Country: Japan

Highway system
- National highways of Japan; Expressways of Japan
← National Route 187	→ National Route 189

National Route 188 is a national highway of Japan connecting Iwakuni and Kudamatsu in Japan, with a total length of 67.7 km (42.07 mi).
