= Japan National Route 187 =

National highway in Japan

National Route 187
- 国道187号

Route information
- Length: 108.4 km (67.4 mi)
- Existed: 18 May 1953–present

Major junctions
- North end: National Route 9 in Masuda
- South end: National Route 2 in Iwakuni

Location
- Country: Japan

Highway system
- National highways of Japan; Expressways of Japan
← National Route 186	→ National Route 188

National Route 187 is a national highway of Japan connecting Iwakuni and Masuda in Japan, with a total length of 108.4 km (67.36 mi).
