= List of cities in Shimane Prefecture by population =

The following list sorts all cities (including towns) in the Japanese prefecture of Shimane with a population of more than 5,000 according to the 2020 Census. As of October 1, 2020, 14 places fulfill this criterion and are listed here. This list refers only to the population of individual cities, towns and villages within their defined limits, which does not include other municipalities or suburban areas within urban agglomerations.

== List ==
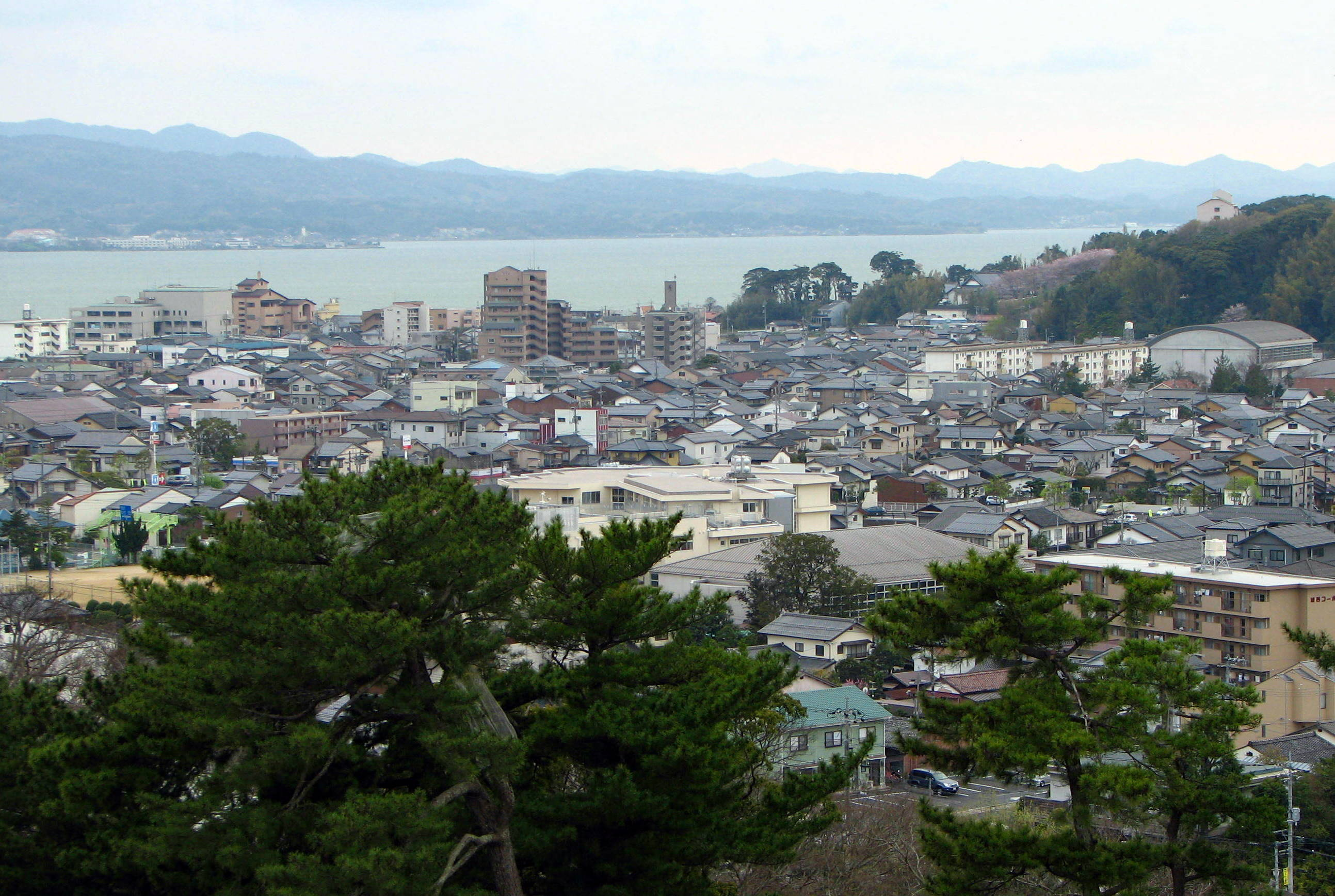
Matsue

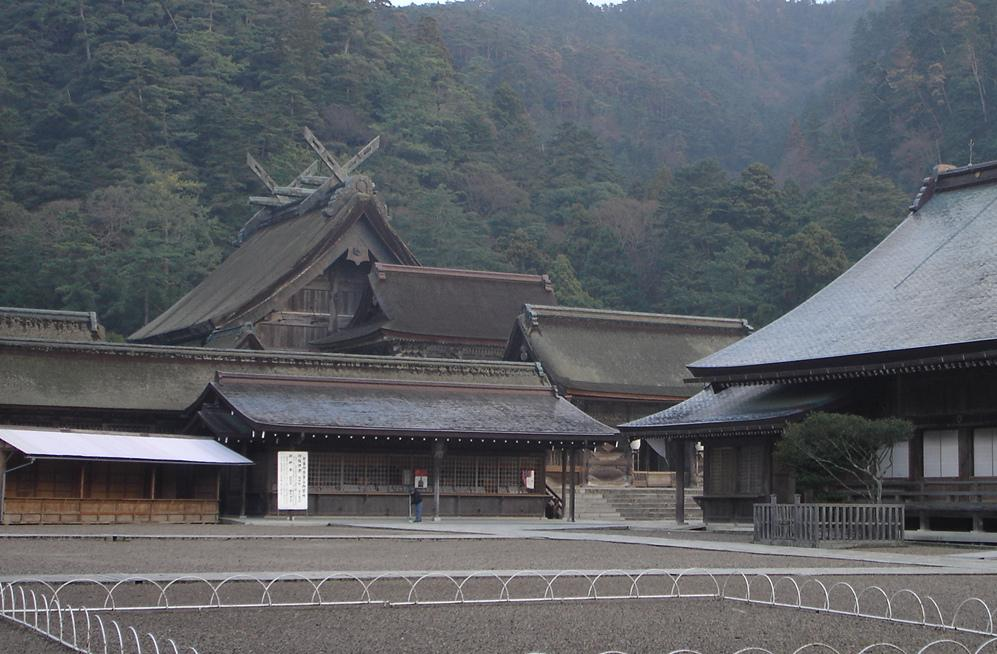
Izumo

The following table lists the 13 cities and towns in Shimane with a population of at least 5,000 on October 1, 2020, according to the 2020 Census. The table also gives an overview of the evolution of the population since the 1995 census.

Rank (2020)	Name	Status	2020	2015	2010	2005	2000	1995
1	Matsue	City	203,779	206,230	208,613	210,796	211,564	206,718
2	Izumo	City	172,887	171,938	171,485	173,751	173,776	172,001
3	Hamada	City	54,622	58,105	61,713	63,046	65,463	68,103
4	Masuda	City	45,039	47,718	50,015	52,368	54,622	56,596
5	Yasugi	City	37,113	39,528	41,836	43,839	45,255	46,934
6	Unnan	City	36,024	39,032	41,917	44,403	46,323	48,248
7	Ōda	City	32,866	35,166	37,996	40,703	42,573	44,953
8	Gōtsu	City	22,979	24,468	25,697	27,774	29,377	30,740
9	Okinoshima	Town	13,438	14,608	15,521	16,904	18,045	18,367
10	Okuizumo	Town	11,859	13,063	14,456	15,812	16,689	17,426
11	Ōnan	Town	10,166	11,101	11,959	12,944	13,866	14,456
12	Tsuwano	Town	6,879	7,653	8,427	9,515	10,628	11,389
13	Yoshika	Town	6,079	6,374	6,810	7,362	8,179	8,600
