= List of places of scenic beauty of Japan (Shimane) =

This list is of the places of scenic beauty of Japan located within the Prefecture of Shimane.

== National Places of Scenic Beauty ==
As of 1 January 2021, seventeen Places have been designated at a national level.

Site	Municipality	Comments	Image	Coordinates	Type	Ref.
Mount Aono 青野山; Aono-yama	Tsuwano			34°27′44″N 131°47′54″E	10	
Ikō-ji Gardens 医光寺庭園; Ikōji teien	Masuda	also an Historic Site		34°40′49″N 131°51′57″E	1	
Oki Norida-no-Hana 隠岐海苔田ノ鼻; Oki Norida-no-hana	Okinoshima	also a Natural Monument		36°19′37″N 133°19′16″E	5, 8	
Oki Kuniga Coast 隠岐国賀海岸; Oki Kuniga-kaigan	Nishinoshima	also a Natural Monument		36°06′08″N 132°57′52″E	5, 8	
Oki Chiburi Sekiheki 隠岐知夫赤壁; Oki Chiburi-sekiheki	Chibu	also a Natural Monument		36°01′02″N 133°00′30″E	8	
Oki Shirashima Coast 隠岐白島海岸; Oki Shirashima-kaigan	Okinoshima	also a Natural Monument		36°20′50″N 133°17′05″E	5, 8	
Oki Fuse Coast 隠岐布施海岸; Oki Fuse-kaigan	Okinoshima			36°17′57″N 133°21′58″E	8	
Oni-no-Shitaburu 鬼舌振; Oni-no-shitaburu	Okuizumo	also a Natural Monument		35°10′26″N 133°01′17″E	5, 6	
Former Hori Family Gardens 旧堀氏庭園; Kyū-Hori-shi teien	Tsuwano			34°29′41″N 131°43′37″E	1	
Kanden-an 菅田庵; Kanden-an	Matsue	also an Historic Site		35°29′17″N 133°03′43″E	1	
Senjō-dani 千丈溪; Senjō-dani	Gōtsu, Ōnan			34°55′02″N 132°21′19″E	6	
Kukedo 潜戸; Kukedo	Matsue	also a Natural Monument		35°34′37″N 133°03′03″E	5, 10	
Dangyo-kei 断魚溪; Dangyo-kei	Ōnan			34°55′45″N 132°28′28″E	6	
Miho-no-Kitaura 美保の北浦; Miho-no-kitaura	Matsue			35°34′25″N 133°17′26″E	5	
Manpuku-ji Gardens 万福寺庭園; Manpukuji teien	Masuda	also an Historic Site		34°40′44″N 131°51′36″E	1	
Tachikue 立久恵; Tachikue	Izumo	also a Natural Monument		35°17′43″N 132°44′06″E	5, 6	
Sakurai Family Gardens 櫻井氏庭園; Sakurai-shi teien	Okuizumo			35°11′51″N 133°00′09″E	1	

== Prefectural Places of Scenic Beauty ==
As of 14 September 2020, six Places have been designated at a prefectural level.

Site	Municipality	Comments	Image	Coordinates	Type	Ref.
Ogawa Gardens 小川庭園; Ogawa teien	Gōtsu			34°59′51″N 132°11′55″E		
Sōsen-kyō 双川峡; Sōsen-kyō	Masuda			34°41′24″N 132°03′36″E		
Kumomi Falls 雲見の滝; Kumomi no taki	Unnan	also a Prefectural Natural Monument		35°14′30″N 132°52′33″E		
Cape Tatara - Matsushima Jishaku-ishi 鑪崎及び松島磁石石; Tatara-saki oyobi Matsushima jishaku-ishi	Masuda	also a Prefectural Natural Monument		34°40′28″N 131°42′06″E		
Washigamine - Tokage-iwa 鷲ヶ峰およびトカゲ岩; Washiga-mine oyobi Tokage-iwa	Okinoshima	also a Prefectural Natural Monument		36°16′30″N 133°19′11″E		
Shizu-no-Iwaya 志都の岩屋; Shizu-no-iwaya	Ōnan	also a Prefectural Natural Monument		34°49′52″N 132°33′24″E		

== Municipal Places of Scenic Beauty ==
As of 1 May 2020, eleven Places have been designated at a municipal level.

Site	Municipality	Comments	Image	Coordinates	Type	Ref.
Mount Makuragi 枕木山; Makuragi-san	Matsue			35°32′25″N 133°07′20″E		
Kowata Sansō 木幡山荘; Kowata sansō	Matsue			35°24′19″N 132°54′39″E		
Ōgamigatake 大神ヶ嶽; Ōgamigatake	Masuda	also a municipal Historic Site		34°30′37″N 132°02′23″E		
Ganraku-ji Purple and White Garden 願楽寺紫白庭; Ganrakuji shihakutei	Ōda			35°04′45″N 132°21′49″E		
Kaketo Matsushima 掛戸松島; Kaketo Matsushima	Ōda			35°14′20″N 132°30′50″E		
Enjō-ji Precinct 円城寺境内; Enjōji keidai	Ōda	also a municipal Historic Site		35°10′32″N 132°33′58″E		
Ido Heizaemon Memorial Stele 井戸平左衛門顕彰碑; Ido Heizaemon kenshō-hi	Ōda	also a municipal Historic Site				
Unju-ji Gardens 雲樹寺庭園; Unjuji teien	Yasugi			35°23′41″N 133°16′02″E		
Iwataki-ji Falls 岩瀧寺の滝; Iwatakiji no taki	Gōtsu			35°02′09″N 132°21′10″E		
Former Bokura Family Gardens 旧卜蔵氏庭園 kyū-Bokura-shi teien	Okuizumo			35°11′01″N 133°09′11″E		
Hiradochi Falls 平栃の滝; Hiradochi no taki	Yoshika			34°28′37″N 131°51′46″E		

== Registered Places of Scenic Beauty ==
As of 1 January 2021, six Monuments have been registered (as opposed to designated) as Places of Scenic Beauty at the national level.

Place	Municipality	Comments	Image	Coordinates	Type	Ref.
Itohara Family Gardens 絲原氏庭園; Itohara-shi teien	Okuizumo					
Okazaki Family Gardens 岡﨑氏庭園; Okazaki-shi teien	Tsuwano			34°28′08″N 131°46′28″E		
Kamei Family Gardens 亀井氏庭園; Kamei-shi teien	Tsuwano			34°27′15″N 131°46′00″E		
Zaima Family Gardens 財間氏庭園; Zaima-shi teien	Tsuwano			34°28′04″N 131°46′27″E		
Tanaka Family Gardens 田中氏庭園; Tanaka-shi teien	Tsuwano			34°28′04″N 131°46′25″E		
Tsubaki Family Gardens 椿氏庭園; Tsubaki-shi teien	Tsuwano			34°28′06″N 131°46′30″E		

== See also ==
- Cultural Properties of Japan
- List of Historic Sites of Japan (Shimane)
- List of parks and gardens of Shimane Prefecture
