= Higashi-Aohara Station =

Railway station in Tsuwano, Shimane Prefecture, Japan

Higashi-Aohara Station 東青原駅
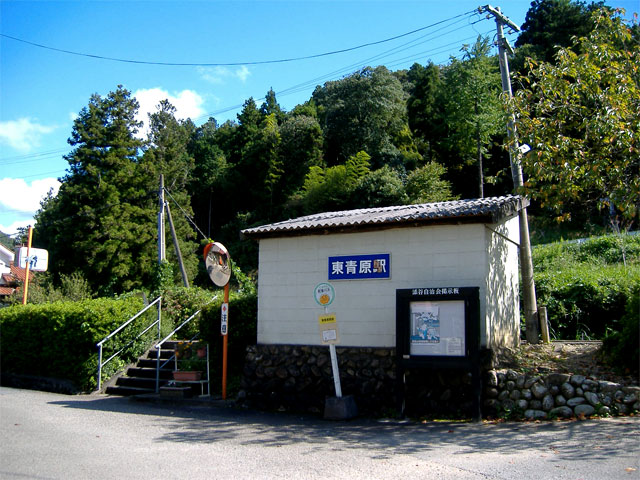
- Higashi-Aohara in August 2007

General information
- Location: Soedani, Tsuwano-cho, Kanoashi-gun, Shimane-ken 699-5213; Japan
- Coordinates: 34°35′6.09″N 131°47′50.62″E
- Owner: West Japan Railway Company
- Operator: West Japan Railway Company
- Line: Yamaguchi Line
- Distance: 80.6 km (50.1 miles) from Shin-Yamaguchi
- Platforms: 1 side platform
- Tracks: 1
- Connections: Bus stop

Other information
- Status: Unstaffed
- Website: Official website

History
- Opened: 1 April 1961; 65 years ago

Passengers
- FY2020: 10

Services
Preceding station	JR West	Following station
Aohara towards Shin-Yamaguchi	Yamaguchi Line Local	Iwami-Yokota towards Masuda
Location
- Location within Shimane Prefecture Location within Japan

Higashi-Aohara Station (東青原駅, Higashi-Aohara-eki) is a passenger railway station located in the town of Tsuwano, Kanoashi District, Shimane Prefecture, Japan. It is operated by the West Japan Railway Company (JR West).

== Lines ==
Higashi-Aohara Station is served by the JR West Yamaguchi Line, and is located 80.6 kilometers from the terminus of the line at Shin-Yamaguchi.

== Station layout ==
The station consists of tone side platform serving a single bi-directional track. There is no station building, but only a shelter located directly on the platform, and the station is unattended.

== History ==
Higashi-Aohara Station was opened on 1 April 1961. With the privatization of the Japan National Railway (JNR) on 1 April 1987, the station came under the aegis of the West Japan railway Company (JR West).

== Passenger statistics ==
In fiscal 2020, the station was used by an average of 10 passengers daily.

== Surrounding area ==
- Aohara Hachimangu Shrine
- Japan National Route 9
- Tsuwano Municipal Aohara Elementary School

== See also ==
- List of railway stations in Japan
