= Manpuku-ji (Masuda) =

Buddhist temple in Shimane Prefecture, Japan

- 萬福寺
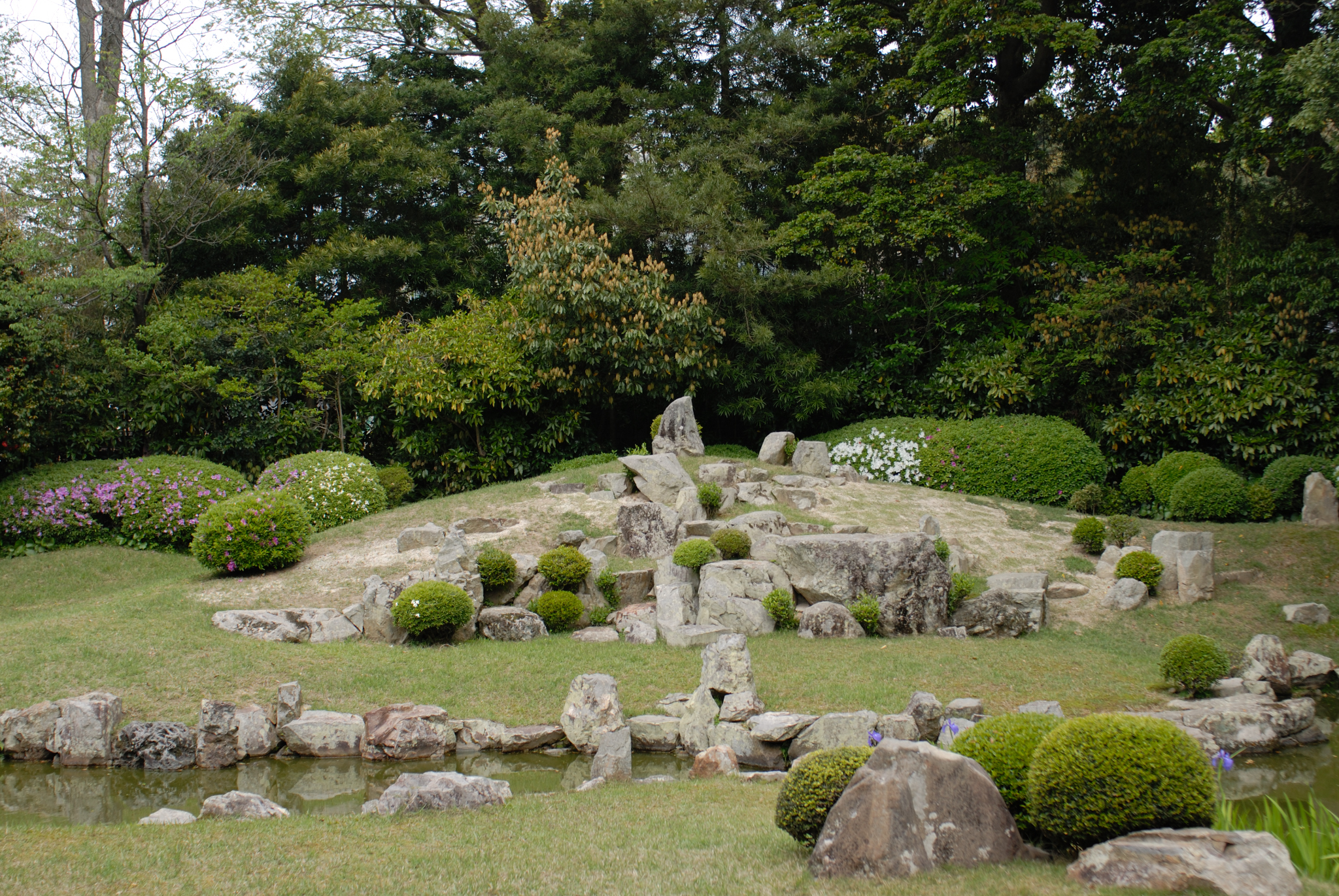
- Manpuku-ji garden

- Location within Shimane Prefecture Location within Japan

Religion
- Affiliation: Buddhist
- Rite: Ji-shū
- Status: functional

Location
- Location: 25-33 Higashimachi, Masuda-shi, Shimane-ken 698-0004
- Country: Japan
- Interactive map of Manpuku-ji
- Coordinates: 34°40′43.0″N 131°51′36.1″E

Architecture
- Founder: Donkai
- Completed: 1319
- National Place of Scenic Beauty National Historic Site of Japan

Manpuku-ji (萬福寺) is a Buddhist temple located in the Higashimachi neighborhood of the city of Masuda, Shimane Prefecture, Japan. The temple belongs to the Ji sect and its full name is Seiryūzan Jōkō-in Manpuku-ji (清瀧山浄光院萬福寺).

== History ==
Founded in the Heian period as the Tendai sect temple of Anpuku-ji (安福寺), the temple was originally located in Nakasuura, Iwami. In 1313, the temple was destroyed by a tsunami and in 1319, Donkai, the 4th generation successor to the founder of the Ji sect, Ippen, revived the temple as a dōjō of the sect. In 1374, Masuda Kanemi, the 11th chieftain of the Masuda clan and castellan of Nanao Castle, moved the temple to its current location and renamed it "Manpuku-ji", making it a bodaiji of his clan. The current Main Hall of the temple dates from this 1374 reconstruction, and was designated an National Important Cultural Property in 1904.

During the Bunmei era (1469-1487), the noted Zen prelate Sesshū Tōyō came to Masuda to study Zen and to create gardens with spiritual significance. The garden at Manpuku-ji is one survivor of several gardens he created in the area during that time . In 1866, during the Second Chōshū expedition, the Battle of Sekishuguchi was fought in Masuda. Manpuku-ji became a stronghold of the pro-shogunate forces of Hamada Domain. The main gate was destroyed, and a number of bullet holes remain in the pillars of its Main Hall.

The gardens of the temple were designated a National Historic Site and a National Place of Scenic Beauty in 1928.

Manpuku-ji is located approximately three kilometers east of Masuda Station JR West San'in Main Line.

== See also ==
- List of Historic Sites of Japan (Shimane)
- List of Places of Scenic Beauty of Japan (Shimane)
