= Aohara Station =

Railway station in Tsuwano, Shimane Prefecture, Japan

Aohara Station 青原駅
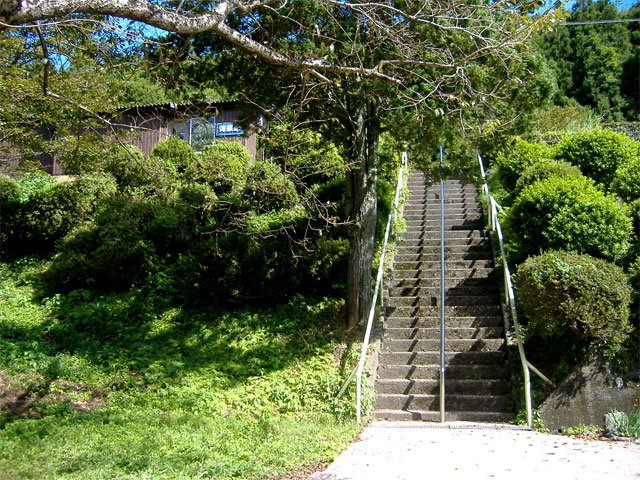
- Entry to Aohara Station in October 2007

General information
- Location: Tomita, Tsuwano-cho, Kanoashi-gun, Shimane-ken 699-5215; Japan
- Coordinates: 34°33′36.91″N 131°48′2.22″E
- Owner: West Japan Railway Company
- Operator: West Japan Railway Company
- Line: Yamaguchi Line
- Distance: 77.5 km (48.2 miles) from Shin-Yamaguchi
- Platforms: 1 side platform
- Tracks: 1
- Connections: Bus stop

Other information
- Status: Unstaffed
- Website: Official website

History
- Opened: 15 July 1924; 102 years ago

Passengers
- FY2020: 9

Services
Preceding station	JR West	Following station
Nichihara towards Shin-Yamaguchi	Yamaguchi Line Local	Higashi-Aohara towards Masuda
Location
- Location within Shimane Prefecture Location within Japan

Aohara Station (青原駅, Aohara-eki) is a passenger railway station located in the town of Tsuwano, Kanoashi District, Shimane Prefecture, Japan. It is operated by the West Japan Railway Company (JR West).

== Lines ==
Aohara Station is served by the JR West Yamaguchi Line, and is located 77.5 kilometers from the terminus of the line at Shin-Yamaguchi.

== Station layout ==
The station consists of one side platform serving a single bi-directional track located on an embankment. It was built with two opposed side platforms with the level crossing, and the unused platform remains in situ, but is fenced off to prevent access. There is no station building, but only a shelter located directly on the platform, and the station is unattended.

== History ==
Aohara Station was opened on 15 July 1924. With the privatization of the Japan National Railway (JNR) on 1 April 1987, the station came under the aegis of the West Japan railway Company (JR West).

== Passenger statistics ==
In fiscal 2020, the station was used by an average of 9 passengers daily.

== Surrounding area ==
- Takatsu River
- Japan National Route 9
- Oba Masatoku Monument

== See also ==
- List of railway stations in Japan
