= Miyake Odoi Site =

Miyake-Odoi Site
- 三宅御土居跡
- Masuda, Shimane Prefecture, Japan
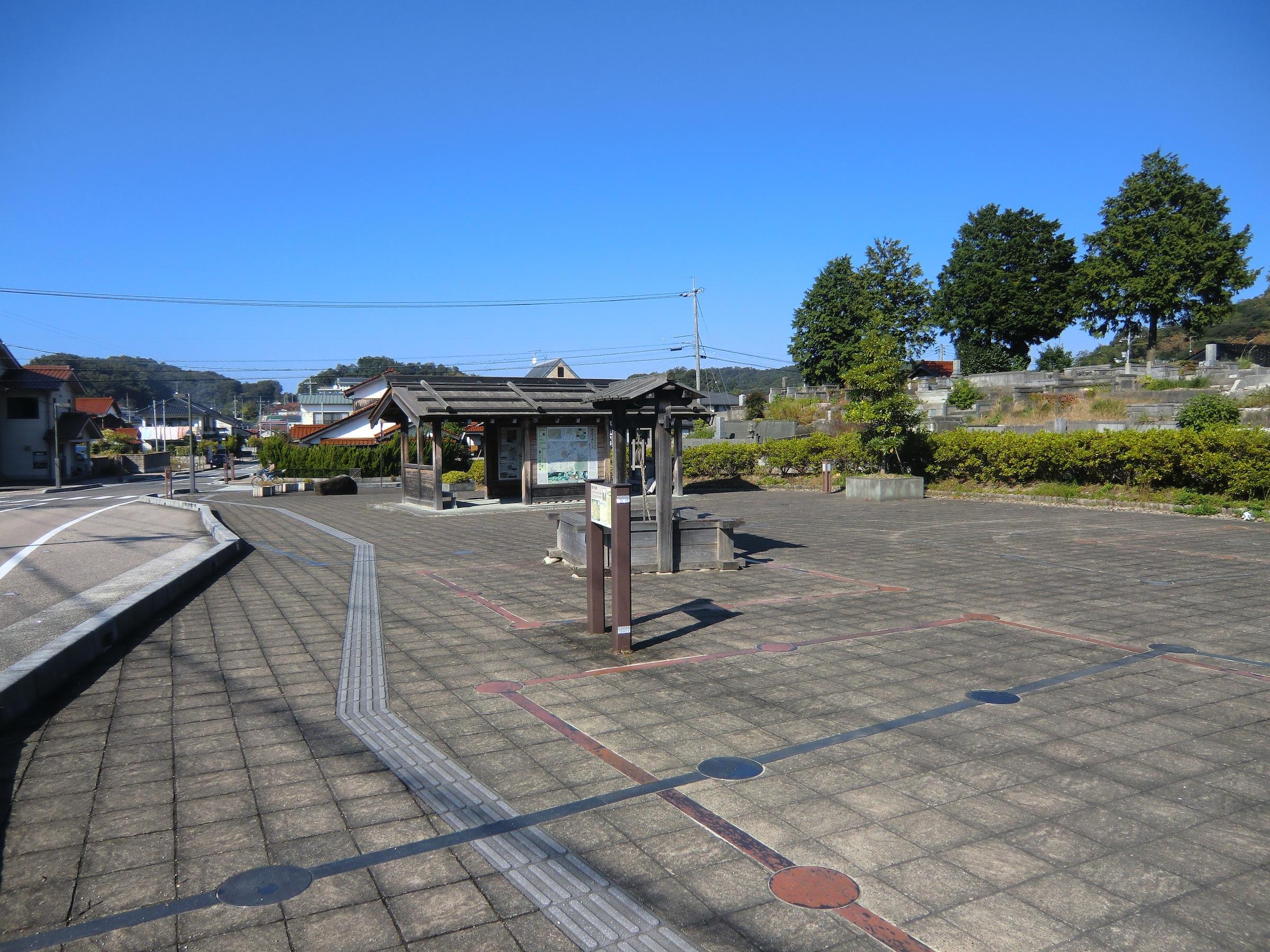
- Miyake-Odoi Site

Site information
- Type: yamajiro-style Japanese castle
- Open to the public: yes
- Condition: Ruins

Location
- Miyake-Odoi Site Miyake-Odoi Site (Japan)
- Coordinates: 34°40′36.4″N 131°51′21.9″E

Site history
- Built: c.1193
- Built by: Masuda clan
- In use: Kamakura-Edo period
- Demolished: 1600
- National Historic Site of Japan

Miyake-Odoi Site (三宅御土居跡, Miyake-Odoi ato) is an archaeological site with the traces of a Muromachi period fortified residence, located in what is now the Miyake neighborhood of the city of Masuda, Shimane Prefecture, in the San'in region of western Japan. Its ruins been protected by the central government as a National Historic Site since 2004 together with the Nanao Castle ruins as the "Masuda clan fortification ruins".

== Overview ==
At the start of the Kamakura period, the nominal shugo of Iwami Province was the Mikimoto clan, a cadet branch of the Fujiwara clan, whose stronghold was at Hamada. The Mikimoto supported Minamoto no Yoritomo and were awarded with the western half of Iwami. Transferred their seat to the Masuda area, they constructed the Miyake-Odoi fortified residence as their new stronghold and changed their name to "Masuda". In addition, they constructed the nearby Nanao Castle as a more secure mountain redoubt. The Miyake-Odoi site was in the flatlands, in a position to control riverine transportation and agricultural water in the Masuda Plain, the largest of the three coastal plains in Iwami Province. It is located on a strategic point controlling the junction of the ancient San'indō highway and the Kitaura Kaigō (leading towards Hagi) and Masuda port on the Sea of Japan.

In the early Muromachi period, the Ōuchi clan of Suō Province greatly increased in power, seizing Nagato Province and later expanding to control much of the Chugoku region and portions of northern Kyushu. The Masuda allied with the Ōuchi, assisting in many of their battles and in trade with the Asian continent. Nearer to home, the Masuda were in constant conflict with the Yoshimi clan of neighboring Tsuwano. However, by the start of the 16th century, the aggressive Amago clan from Izumo Province posed an increasing threat. After the defeat of combined Ōuchi and Masuda forces at Gassantoda Castle, the Masuda came to be increasingly dissatisfied with the ineffectual rule of Ōuchi Yoshitaka, and in 1551 sided with Sue Harukata's coup against the Ōuchi. The Masuda clan already had a close relationship to Sue clan through marriages. However, the situation was complicated when Mōri Motonari broke with the Sue and defeated them at the Battle of Itsukushima. The Mōri clan was allied with the Masuda clan's arch-enemies, the Yoshimi clan. The efforts of Masuda Fujikane (1529-1597) to seek peace failed, and he abandoned the Miyake-Odoi residence for the more easily defendable Nanao Castle, 870 meters across the Masuda River. In 1556, Kikkawa Motoharu invaded Iwami together with Yoshimi forces. The Masuda held out at Nanao Castle for half a year, but eventually were forced to capitulate, losing much of their territory, and to accept the Mōri as their overlords. Masuda Fujikane's son, Masuda Motoyoshi, returned his seat to Miyake Odoi and made some major renovations. However, after death of Toyotomi Hideyoshi, the Mōri were deprived of two-thirds of their territory and reduced to only Nagato and Suō Provinces following the 1600 Battle of Sekigahara. Tokugawa Ieyasu recognized Masuda Masunaga's skill at both politics and military matters, and offered to guarantee his existing domains; however, Masunaga refused to pledge direct fealty to the Tokugawa shogunate. He was forced to leave the Masuda area for a much smaller domain within eastern Nagato province and both Miyake Odoi and Nanao Castle were abandoned The Masuda remained retainers of the Mōri clan to the end of the Edo period. The Miyake-Odoi site was subsequently occupied by a Buddhist temple, Senko-ji, which protected the ruins from urban development. The Miyake-Odoi and Nanao Castle ruins became Shimane Prefectural Historic Sites in the 1960s. Following flooding in 1983, Masuda City took into consideration the importance of the Miyake-Odoi site in city planning relocated the temple, and opened the site as an archaeological park.

The site of the residence covered an area of about 190 meters east–west by 110 meters north–south; however, the overall shape is not a square or a rectangle, but rather a boot-shape with the east side extending to the north. On both sides (east and west), portions of the earthwork ramparts remain, with the eastern rampart 87 meters long and 5 meters high, and the west rampart 53 meters long and 4.5 meters high. A 1.5-meter-high rampart was also found on the south side, but was truncated. There was a moat around the entire circumference of the residence site, filled with water from the Masuda River. The moat on the east and west sides has a width of 10 meters and a depth of 2.5 to 3 meters, the moat on the north side is 10 to 16 meters in width and 1.5 meters in depth, and the river on the south side is 20 to 25 meters in width. the foundations of many buildings have been found in this enclosure, including a 13th-century wooden well, the 16th-century cornerstone building, and blacksmith, and the 12th-16th century buried pillar building. Artifacts included a large amount of ceramics from the 13th to 16th centuries as well as Chinese celadon were excavated. was done. and other items. It is believed that private residences such and gardens were on the west side of the enclsoure, and public facilities such as the government hall, blacksmith and rice storehouses were on the east side.

The site is a 20-minute walk from Masuda Station on the JR West San'in Main Line.

== See also ==
- List of Historic Sites of Japan (Shimane)

== Literature ==
- De Lange, William (2021). An Encyclopedia of Japanese Castles. Groningen: Toyo Press. pp. 600 pages. ISBN 978-9492722300.
- Schmorleitz, Morton S. (1974). Castles in Japan. Tokyo: Charles E. Tuttle Co. pp. 144–145. ISBN 0-8048-1102-4.
- Motoo, Hinago (1986). Japanese Castles. Tokyo: Kodansha. p. 200 pages. ISBN 0-87011-766-1.
