= Yoshika, Shimane =

Yoshika 吉賀町
- Town
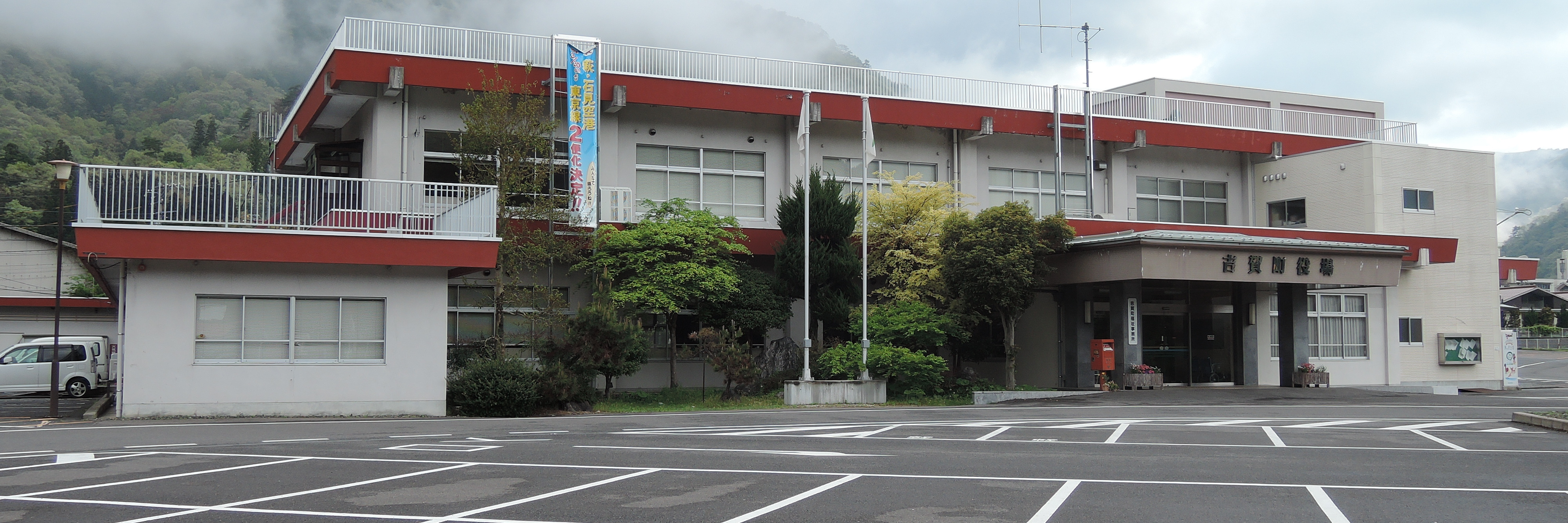
- Yoshika town hall

- Flag Emblem
- Location of Yoshika in Shimane Prefecture

- Location in Japan
- Coordinates: 34°21′13″N 131°56′06″E
- Country: Japan
- Region: Chūgoku; San'in
- Prefecture: Shimane
- District: Kanoashi

Area
  - Total: 336.50 km^{2} (129.92 sq mi)

Population (June 30, 2023)
  - Total: 5,759
  - Density: 17.11/km^{2} (44.33/sq mi)
- Time zone: UTC+09:00 (JST)
- City hall address: 750 Muikaichi, Yoshika-cho, Kanoashi-gun, Shimane-ken 699-5513
- Climate: Cfa
- Website: Official website
- Symbols
- Flower: Rhododendron subg. Hymenanthes
- Tree: Japanese Umbrella Pine

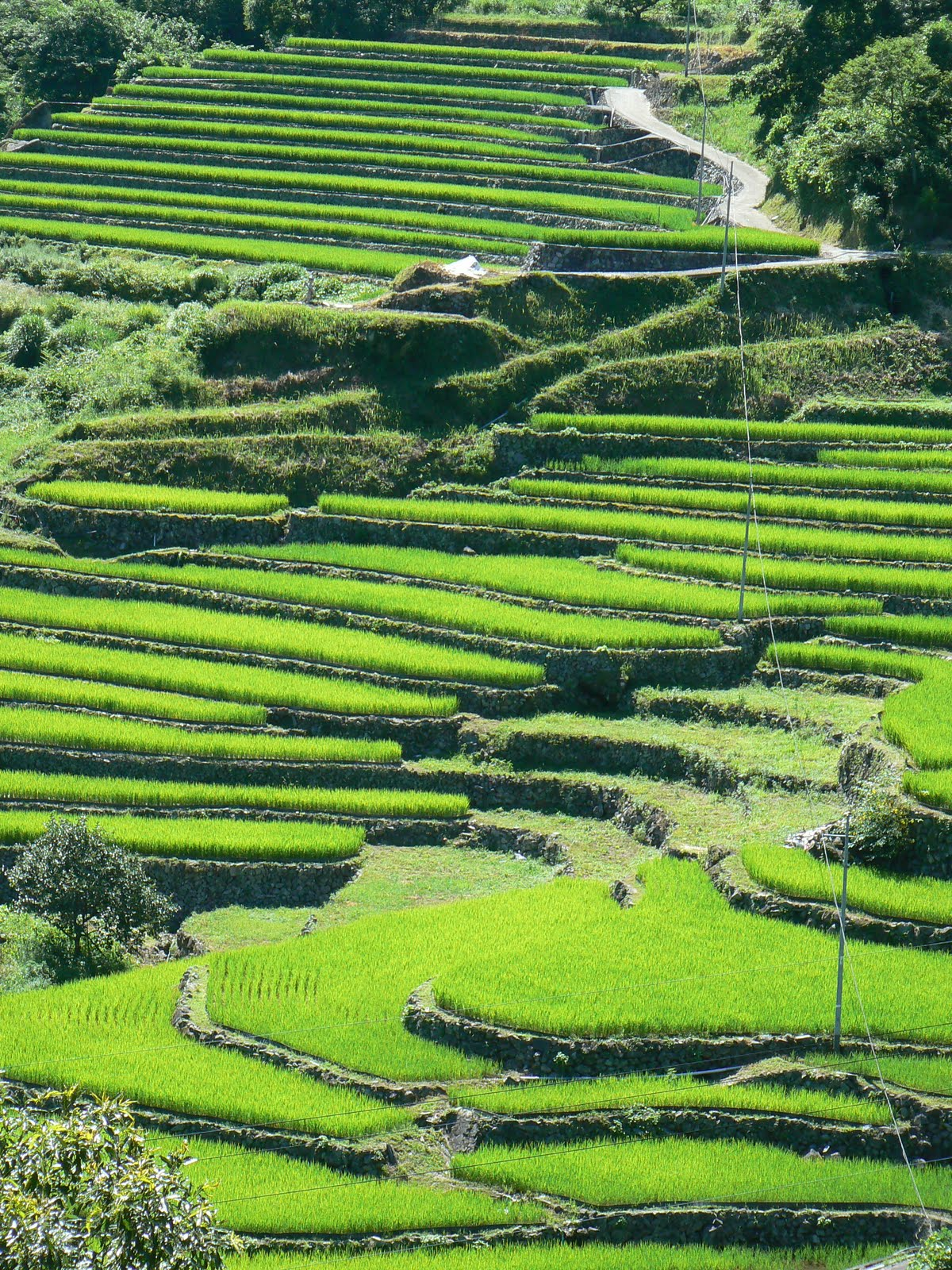
Ōidani rice terraces

Yoshika (吉賀町, Yoshika-chō) is a town located in Kanoashi District, Shimane Prefecture, Japan. As of 30 June 2023, the town had an estimated population of 5,759 in 3042 households and a population density of 17 persons per km^{2}. The total area of the town is 336.50 square kilometres (129.92 sq mi).

== Geography ==
Yoshioka is located in the Chugoku Mountains in the far southwestern corner of Yamaguchi Prefecture. Heavily forested and surrounded by steep mountains, arable land is available along the Takatsu River and its tributaries.

== Neighboring municipalities ==
Shimane Prefecture

- Masuda
- Tsuwano

Yamaguchi Prefecture

- Iwakuni
- Shūnan
- Yamaguchi

=== Climate ===
Yoshika has a humid subtropical climate (Köppen climate classification Cfa) with very warm summers and cool winters. Precipitation is abundant throughout the year. The average annual temperature in Yoshika is 13.4 °C (56.1 °F). The average annual rainfall is 1,940.5 mm (76.40 in) with July as the wettest month. The temperatures are highest on average in August, at around 25.3 °C (77.5 °F), and lowest in January, at around 2.2 °C (36.0 °F). The highest temperature ever recorded in Yoshika was 36.8 °C (98.2 °F) on 19 August 2020; the coldest temperature ever recorded was −12.0 °C (10.4 °F) on 8 February 2018.

Climate data for Yoshika (2006−2020 normals, extremes 2006−present)
Month	Jan	Feb	Mar	Apr	May	Jun	Jul	Aug	Sep	Oct	Nov	Dec	Year
Record high °C (°F)	15.8 (60.4)	20.4 (68.7)	27.5 (81.5)	29.4 (84.9)	33.0 (91.4)	35.1 (95.2)	36.1 (97.0)	36.8 (98.2)	36.2 (97.2)	30.3 (86.5)	26.0 (78.8)	22.5 (72.5)	36.8 (98.2)
Mean daily maximum °C (°F)	6.8 (44.2)	8.9 (48.0)	12.9 (55.2)	18.3 (64.9)	23.5 (74.3)	25.7 (78.3)	29.3 (84.7)	30.9 (87.6)	26.4 (79.5)	21.1 (70.0)	15.4 (59.7)	9.2 (48.6)	19.0 (66.3)
Daily mean °C (°F)	2.2 (36.0)	3.7 (38.7)	6.8 (44.2)	11.6 (52.9)	16.7 (62.1)	20.5 (68.9)	24.4 (75.9)	25.3 (77.5)	21.1 (70.0)	15.1 (59.2)	9.5 (49.1)	4.3 (39.7)	13.4 (56.2)
Mean daily minimum °C (°F)	−1.4 (29.5)	−0.7 (30.7)	1.3 (34.3)	5.3 (41.5)	10.6 (51.1)	16.3 (61.3)	20.7 (69.3)	21.3 (70.3)	17.1 (62.8)	10.5 (50.9)	4.8 (40.6)	0.5 (32.9)	8.9 (47.9)
Record low °C (°F)	−9.8 (14.4)	−12.0 (10.4)	−5.3 (22.5)	−3.4 (25.9)	0.2 (32.4)	6.5 (43.7)	14.1 (57.4)	13.1 (55.6)	8.4 (47.1)	2.6 (36.7)	−3.4 (25.9)	−5.6 (21.9)	−12.0 (10.4)
Average precipitation mm (inches)	102.5 (4.04)	105.3 (4.15)	144.9 (5.70)	147.7 (5.81)	139.0 (5.47)	241.5 (9.51)	340.2 (13.39)	189.4 (7.46)	186.6 (7.35)	127.0 (5.00)	87.2 (3.43)	127.8 (5.03)	1,940.5 (76.40)
Average precipitation days (≥ 1.0 mm)	14.1	12.3	12.2	10.7	8.8	12.1	13.4	10.1	11.1	8.1	9.7	14.7	137.3
Mean monthly sunshine hours	76.4	95.7	147.2	178.4	208.1	132.1	135.3	178.4	128.1	146.7	117.4	79.1	1,621.8
Source: Japan Meteorological Agency

=== Demographics ===
Per Japanese census data, the population of Yoshioka in 2020 is 6,077 people. Yoshioka has been conducting censuses since 1920.

Historical population
Year	Pop.	±%
1920	11,231	—
1925	11,358	+1.1%
1930	11,726	+3.2%
1935	12,253	+4.5%
1940	11,996	−2.1%
1945	13,562	+13.1%
1950	14,113	+4.1%
1955	15,188	+7.6%
1960	13,876	−8.6%
1965	11,242	−19.0%
1970	9,667	−14.0%
1975	9,122	−5.6%
1980	9,415	+3.2%
1985	9,165	−2.7%
1990	8,725	−4.8%
1995	8,600	−1.4%
2000	8,179	−4.9%
2005	7,362	−10.0%
2010	6,813	−7.5%
2015	6,374	−6.4%
2020	6,077	−4.7%
Yoshioka population statistics

== History ==
The area of Yoshioka was part of ancient Iwami Province. During the Edo Period, the area was part of the holdings of Tsuwano Domain. After the Meiji restoration, the villages of Muikaichi and Kakinoki were established on within Kanoashi District, Shimane on April 1, 1889, with the creation of the modern municipalities system. Muikaichi was elevated to town status on November 13, 1947. The town of Yoshioka was formed on October 1, 2005, from the merger of the town of Muikaich and the village of Kakinoki.

== Government ==
Yoshioka has a mayor-council form of government with a directly elected mayor and a unicameral town council of 12 members. Yoshioka, collectively with the town of Tsuwano, contributes one member to the Shimane Prefectural Assembly. In terms of national politics, the town is part of the Shimane 2nd district of the lower house of the Diet of Japan.

== Economy ==
Yoshioka is a very rural area, with an economy based on agriculture and forestry.

== Education ==
Yoshioka has five public elementary school and four public junior high schools operated by the city government, and one public high school operated by the Shimane Prefectural Board of Education.

== Transportation ==
=== Railway ===
Yoshioka has no passenger railway service. The nearest train stations are Nishikigawa Seiryū Line Nishikichō Station in Iwakuni and JR West Yamaguchi Line Nichihara Station in Tsuwano.

=== Highways ===
- Chugoku Expressway
- National Route 187

== Notable people from Yoshika ==
- Hanae Mori, fashion designer
