= Kakinoki, Shimane =

Dissolved municipality in Shimane prefecture, Japan

Kakinoki (柿木村, Kakinoki-mura) was a village located in Kanoashi District, Shimane Prefecture, Japan.

As of 2003, the village had an estimated population of 1,789 and a density of 12.99 persons per km^{2}. The total area was 137.72 km^{2}.

On October 1, 2005, Kakinoki, along with the village of Muikaichi (also from Kanoashi District), were merged to create the town of Yoshika.
