= Muikaichi, Shimane =

Dissolved municipality in Shimane prefecture, Japan

Muikaichi (六日市町, Muikaichi-chō) was a town located in Kanoashi District, Shimane Prefecture, Japan.

As of 2003, the town had an estimated population of 6,124 and a density of 30.84 persons per km^{2}. The total area was 198.57 km^{2}.

On October 1, 2005, Muikaichi, along with the village of Kakinoki (also from Kanoashi District), were merged to create the town of Yoshika.

== Notable people from Muikaichi ==
- Hanae Mori, fashion designer
