= Iwami-Yokota Station =

Railway station in Masuda, Shimane Prefecture, Japan

Iwami-Yokota Station 石見横田駅
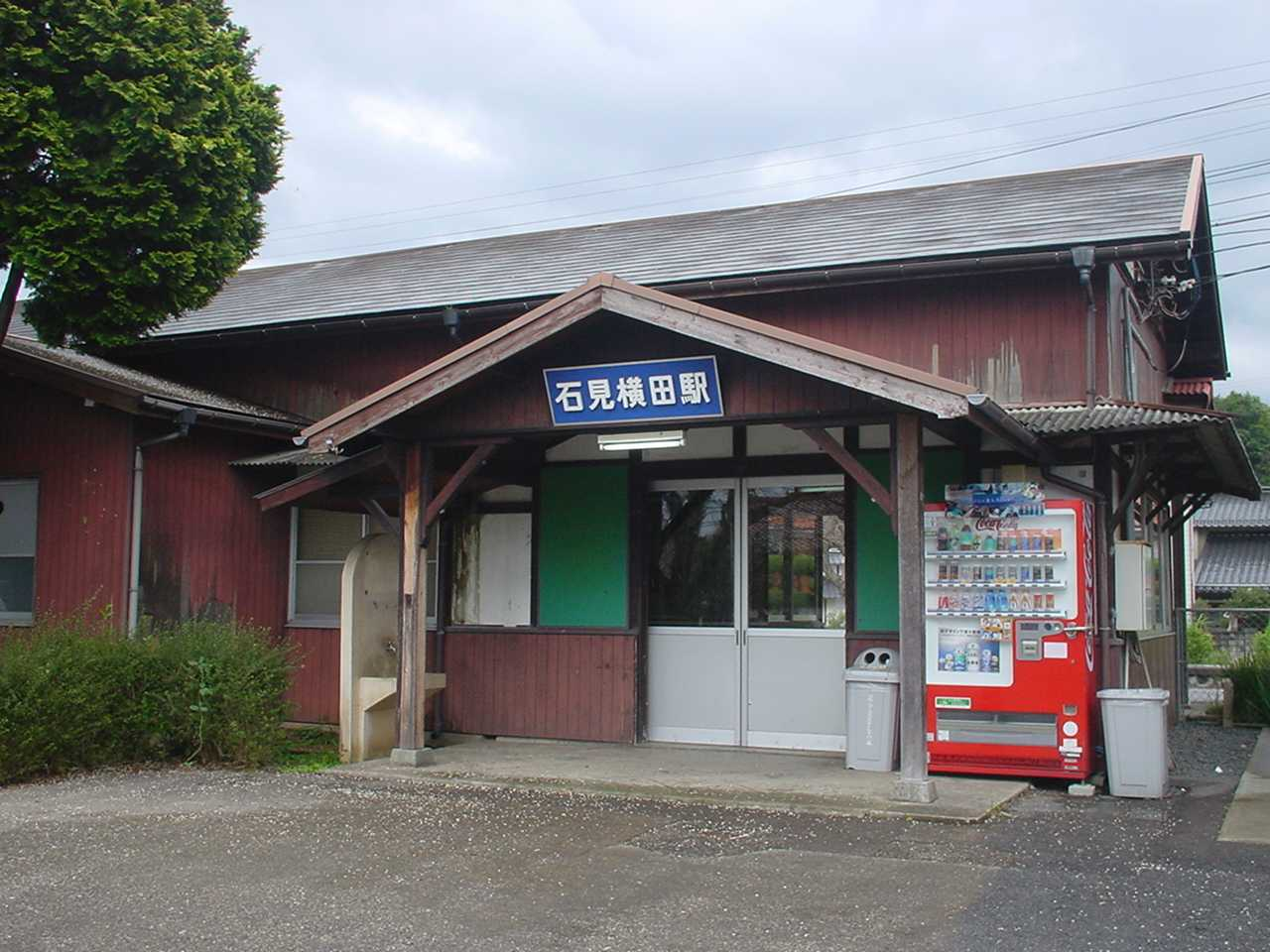
- Iwami-Yokota Station in June 2019

General information
- Location: Kanda-cho, Masuda-shi, Shimane-ken 699-5133; Japan
- Coordinates: 34°37′4.85″N 131°48′16.30″E
- Owner: West Japan Railway Company
- Operator: West Japan Railway Company
- Line: Yamaguchi Line
- Distance: 84.7 km (52.6 miles) from Shin-Yamaguchi
- Platforms: 2 side platforms
- Tracks: 2
- Connections: Bus stop

Other information
- Status: Unstaffed
- Website: Official website

History
- Opened: 1 April 1923; 103 years ago

Passengers
- FY2020: 12

Services
Preceding station	JR West	Following station
Higashi-Aohara towards Shin-Yamaguchi	Yamaguchi Line Local	Honmataga towards Masuda
Location
- Location within Shimane Prefecture Location within Japan

Iwami-Yokota Station (石見横田駅, Iwami-Yokota-eki) is a passenger railway station located in the city of Masuda, Shimane Prefecture, Japan. It is operated by the West Japan Railway Company (JR West).

== Lines ==
Iwami-Yokota Station is served by the JR West Yamaguchi Line, and is located 84.7 kilometers from the terminus of the line at Shin-Yamaguchi.

== Station layout ==
The station consists of two opposed unnumbered side platforms connected by a level crossing. The station is unattended.

== Platforms ==
station side	■ Yamaguchi Line	for Masuda
opposite side	■ Yamaguchi Line	for Tsuwano and Yamaguchi

== History ==
Iwami-Yokota Station was opened on the Japan Government Railways Yamaguchi Line when the line was extended from Tsuwano Station to Masuda Station on 1 April 1923. Freight operations were discontinued on 1 December 1981. With the privatization of the Japan National Railway (JNR) on 1 April 1987, the station came under the aegis of the West Japan railway Company (JR West).

== Passenger statistics ==
In fiscal 2020, the station was used by an average of 12 passengers daily.

== Surrounding area ==
- Masuda Municipal Yokota Junior High School
- Japan National Route 9

== See also ==
- List of railway stations in Japan
