= Nichihara, Shimane =

Dissolved municipality in Shimane prefecture, Japan

Nichihara 日原町
- Former town
- Nichihara-chō
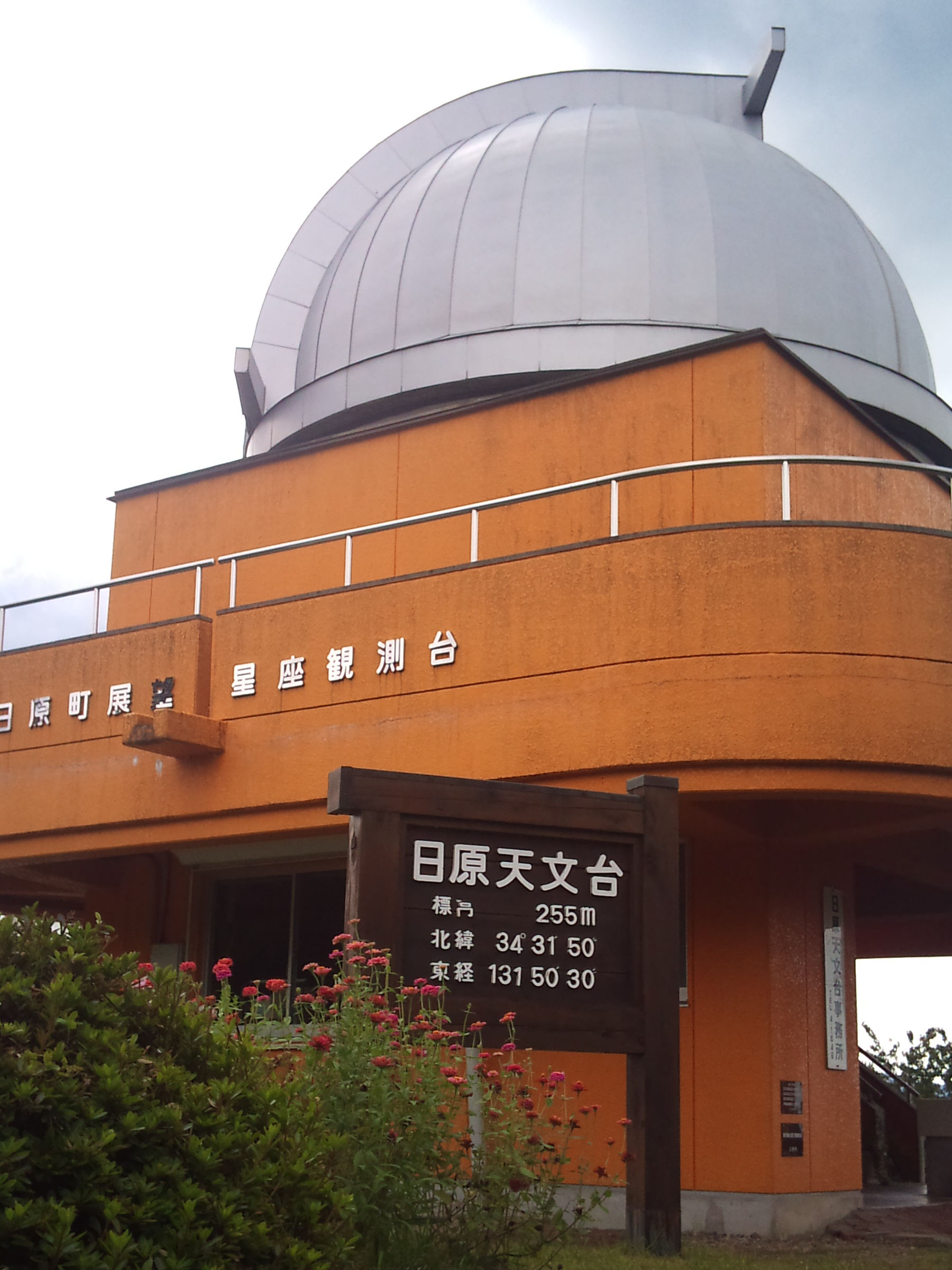
- Nichihara Observatory

- Flag Seal
- Interactive map of Nichihara
- Coordinates: 34°28′N 131°45′E
- Country: Japan
- Prefecture: Shimane
- District: Kanoashi
- Merged: September 25, 2005

Area
  - Total: 167.24 km^{2} (64.57 sq mi)

Population (2003)
  - Total: 4,255
  - Density: 25.44/km^{2} (65.90/sq mi)
- Postal code: 699-5292
- Website: Official website (archived)

Nichihara (日原町, Nichihara-chō) was a town located in Kanoashi District, Shimane Prefecture, Japan.

As of 2003, the town had an estimated population of 4,255 and a density of 25.44 persons per km^{2}. The total area was 167.24 km^{2}.

On September 25, 2005, Nichihara was merged into the expanded town of Tsuwano.

The town has a sky observatory which once had one of the biggest lenses in Japan.

The Takatsu river runs through the town and in the summer season fishermen catch Ayu fish, a local delicacy. It is said to be the cleanest river in Japan, thus producing said Ayu fish.
