= Ikō-ji =

- 医光寺
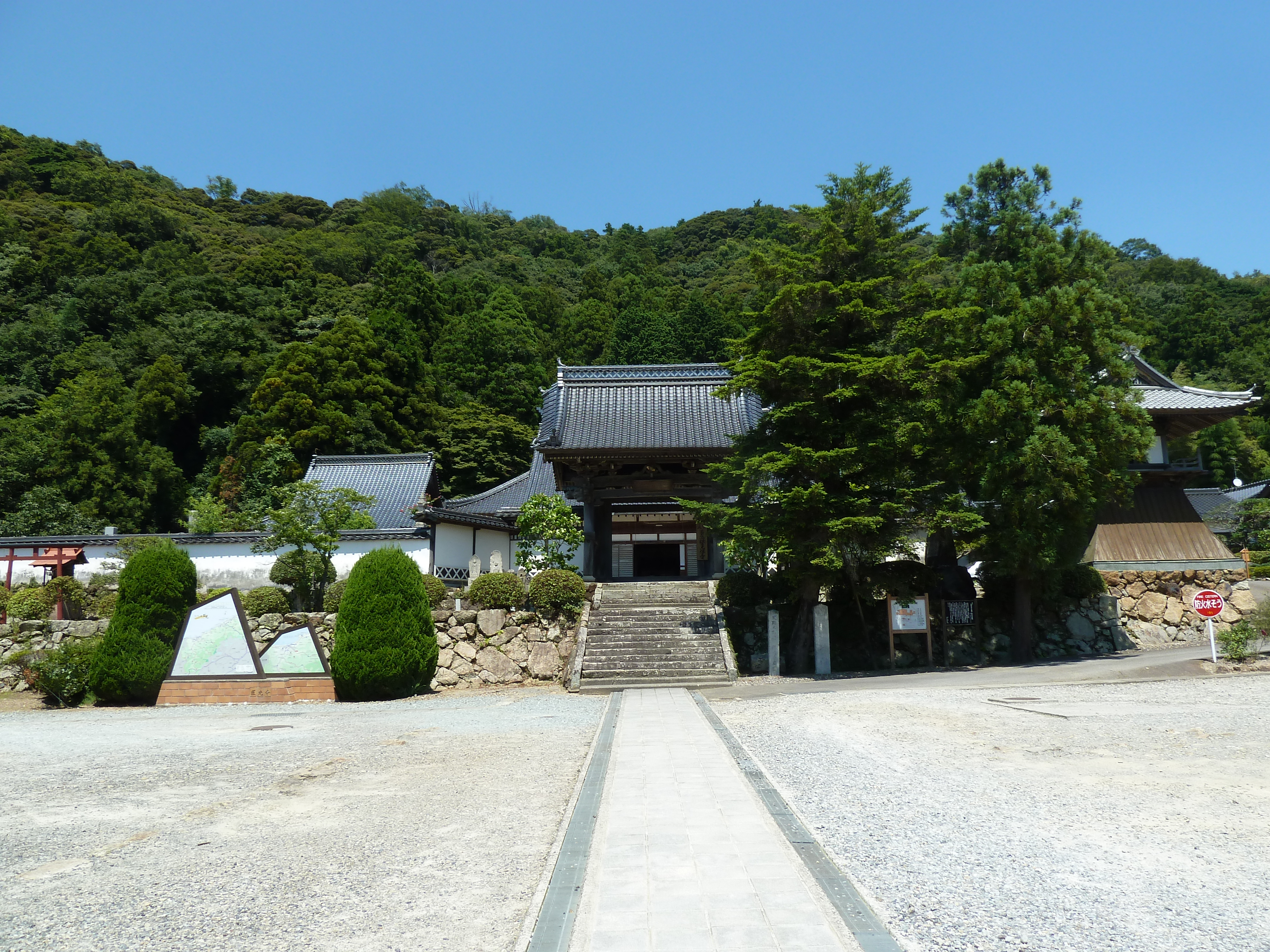
- Ikō-ji precincts

- Location within Shimane Prefecture Location within Japan

Religion
- Affiliation: Buddhist
- Rite: Rinzai school
- Status: functional

Location
- Location: 4-29 Somebachō, Masuda, Shimane 698-0011
- Country: Japan
- Interactive map of Ikō-ji
- Coordinates: 34°40′48.0″N 131°51′56.5″E

Architecture
- Founder: Masuda Munkane
- Completed: Tenmon era (1532-1555)
- National Place of Scenic Beauty National Historic Site of Japan

Ikō-ji (医光寺) is a Buddhist temple located in the Somebachō neighborhood of the city of Masuda, Shimane Prefecture, Japan. The temple belongs to the Tōfuku-ji branch of the Rinzai school. The temple's full name is Ryūzō-san Ikō-ji (滝蔵山 医光寺).

== History ==
A Tendai sect temple called Sukan-ji (崇観寺) was built slightly to the north of this location in 1363. Sukan-ji was patronized by the powerful Masuda clan for generations. The 15th generation chieftain of the clan, Masuda Kanehiro invited Sesshū Tōyō to become the fifth chief priest of Sekan-ji, and in the Bunmei era (1469-1487) Sesshū laid out its gardens. The semi-circumferential pond garden, which retains the characteristics of the Muromachi period, is centered on a pond shaped like Japanese crane with outspread wings in front of the shoin study, with a small island. Using the slope of the hill in the background, azaleas are planted in a stepped pattern, and weeping cherry trees are arranged. This is said to be one of the most famous of Sesshū's gardens. In the last years of Sesshū's life, he continued to live in Masuda to study Japanese Zen. In 1506, at 87 years old, Sesshū died at Toko-ji temple, but his remains were taken to Igō-ji, where he was cremated. Sukan-ji fell into ruins in the Sengoku period, but in the Tenmon era (1532-1555), the 17th chieftain of the Masuda clan, Masuda Munekane, constructed Iko-ji on the hill to the south of Sukan-ji, and the two temples were merged. The buildings that remains today were rebuilt after a fire in 1729.

The main gate of Ikō-ji was originally a portion of the Ōtemon Gate of Nanao Castle, but was relocated here after the 1600 Battle of Sekigahara. It is a designated Shimane Prefectural Tangible Cultural Property.

The temple was designated a National Historic Site and its gardens a National Place of Scenic Beauty in 1928.

Ikō-ji is located approximately three kilometers east of Masuda Station JR West San'in Main Line.

== See also ==
- List of Historic Sites of Japan (Shimane)
- List of Places of Scenic Beauty of Japan (Shimane)
