= Nanao Castle (Iwami) =

- 七尾城
- Masuda, Shimane Prefecture, Japan
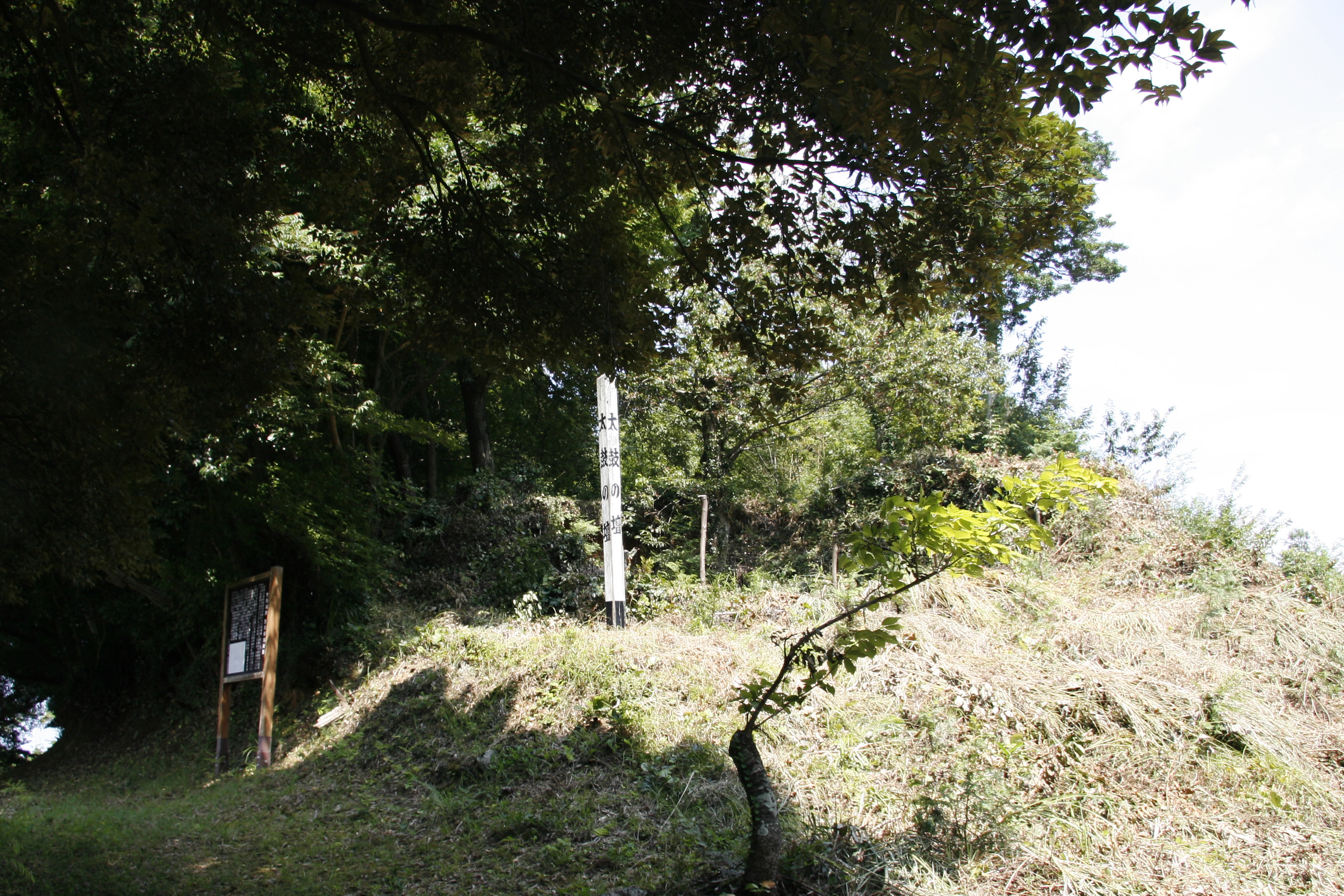
- Ruins of Nanao Castle

Site information
- Type: yamajiro-style Japanese castle
- Open to the public: yes
- Condition: Ruins

Location
- Nanao Castle Nanao Castle (Japan)
- Coordinates: 34°40′19.1″N 131°51′49.6″E

Site history
- Built: c.1193
- Built by: Masuda clan
- In use: Kamakura-Edo period
- Demolished: 1600

Nanao Castle (七尾城, Nanao jō) was a Muromachi period yamajiro-stype Japanese castle located in what is now the city of Masuda, Shimane Prefecture, in the San'in region of western Japan. Its ruins been protected by the central government as a National Historic Site since 2004 together with the Miyake Odoi fortified residence as the "Masuda clan fortification ruins".

== Overview ==
Nanao Castle is located on the top of Mount Shiroyama, a 120-meter hill overlooking the Hamada Plain at the estuary of the Takatsu and Masuda Rivers in western Shimane prefecture. It is the largest of the four coastal plains in former Iwami Province. The castle is located on a strategic point controlling the junction of the ancient San'indō highway and the Kitaura Kaigō (leading towards Hagi) and Masuda port on the Sea of Japan.

At the start of the Kamakura period, the nominal shugo of Iwami Province was the Mikimoto clan, a cadet branch of the Fujiwara clan, whose stronghold was at Hamada. The Mikimoto supported Minamoto no Yoritomo and were awarded with the western half of Iwami. Transferred their seat to the Masuda area, they constructed the Miyake Odoi fortified residence as their new stronghold and changed their name to "Masuda". In the early Muromachi period, the Ōuchi clan of Suō Province greatly increased in power, seizing Nagato Province and later expanding to control much of the Chugoku region and portions of northern Kyushu. The Masuda allied with the Ōuchi, assisting in many of their battles and in trade with the Asian continent. Nearer to home, the Masuda were in constant conflict with the Yoshimi clan of neighboring Tsuwano. However, by the start of the 16th century, the aggressive Amago clan from Izumo Province posed an increasing threat. After the defeat of combined Ōuchi and Masuda forces at Gassantoda Castle, the Masuda came to be increasingly dissatisfied with the ineffectual rule of Ōuchi Yoshitaka, and in 1551 sided with Sue Harukata's coup against the Ōuchi. The Masuda clan already had a close relationship to Sue clan through marriages. However, the situation was complicated when Mōri Motonari broke with the Sue and defeated them at the Battle of Itsukushima. The Mōri clan was allied with the Masuda clan's arch-enemies, the Yoshimi clan. The efforts of Masuda Fujikane (1529-1597) to seek peace failed, and he abandoned the Miyake Odoi residence for the more easily defendable Nanao Castle, 870 meters across the Masuda River.

It is uncertain when Nanao Castle was constructed, but the prevailing theory is that it was built by Masuda Kanetaka in 1193. It is mentioned in numerous Nanboku-chō period documents. This castle was arranged in a "Y"-shape on the top of Mount Shiroyama and was protected by combination of sheer clay walls and narrow paths. In 1556, Kikkawa Motoharu invaded Iwami together with Yoshimi forces. The Masuda held out at Nanao Castle for half a year, but eventually were forced to capitulate, losing much of their territory, and to accept the Mōri as their overlords. The Mōri ordered that the Masuda greatly expand and strengthen Nanao Castle, and use it as a base against the Amago clan to the east. The campaign against the Amago lasted for several years until the Amago defeat in 1566. Masuda forces also fought under Kikkawa Motoharu in other campaigns throughout the Chugoku region. Masuda Motonaga (1558-1640) became an important general in the Mōri army and fought in many of the campaigns of Toyotomi Hideyoshi. However, after death of Hideyoshi, the Mōri were deprived of two-thirds of their territory and reduced to only Nagato and Suō Provinces following the 1600 Battle of Sekigahara. Tokugawa Ieyasu recognized Masuda Masunaga's skill at both politics and military matters, and offered to guarantee his existing domains; however, Masunaga refused to pledge direct fealty to the Tokugawa shogunate. He was forced to leave the Masuda area for a much smaller domain within eastern Nagato province and Nanao Castle was abandoned The Masuda remained retainers of the Mōri clan to the end of the Edo period.

During archaeological excavations, more than 40 large and small enclosures, dry moats, earthen walls, and the remains of wells were unearthed, along with the foundations of many buildings from the late Sengoku period. At present, there are no structures remaining of Nanao Castle except for part of one gate, which is now at the temple of Ikō-ji in Masuda city. The castle site, now occupied by a small Shinto shrine, is a 20-minute walk from Masuda Station on the JR West San'in Main Line.

== See also ==
- List of Historic Sites of Japan (Shimane)

== Literature ==
- De Lange, William (2021). An Encyclopedia of Japanese Castles. Groningen: Toyo Press. pp. 600 pages. ISBN 978-9492722300.
- Schmorleitz, Morton S. (1974). Castles in Japan. Tokyo: Charles E. Tuttle Co. pp. 144–145. ISBN 0-8048-1102-4.
- Motoo, Hinago (1986). Japanese Castles. Tokyo: Kodansha. p. 200 pages. ISBN 0-87011-766-1.
