= Dominique Sirop =

French fashion designer (born 1956)

- Born: 1956 (age 69–70); Paris, France
- Education: Yves Saint Laurent
- Labels: Yves Saint Laurent; Givenchy; Hanae Mori; Dominique Sirop

Dominique Sirop (born January 1956) is a French fashion designer and grand couturier.

== Early life ==
Sirop's mother was a couturier's mannequin in Paris for the House of Paquin, and from seeing his mother at work Sirop got the ambition to make a career in the world of haute couture. He has said that by the age of seven, he knew that he wanted to be "either a fashion designer, a magician, or the Sun King".

== Career ==
At the age of seventeen, Sirop was apprenticed to Yves Saint Laurent, beginning work in his atelier, where he learned about dress materials and sewing. In 1978, he showed some sketches to Hubert de Givenchy, who hired him as an assistant designer. He stayed with Givenchy's studio until 1989, and while there his clients included Audrey Hepburn. Then from 1989 to 1996 he was a designer for Hanae Mori. He also turned to research and writing, going on to publish two books, A Historical Overview of the House of Paquin (1989) and Jacqueline Delubac (1994). He became an expert on the history of costume, and is consulted in this area by museum curators.

In 1995, Sirop was Hubert de Givenchy's chosen successor as chief designer of the Givenchy label, but Bernard Arnault, head of the Louis Vuitton Moët Hennessy conglomerate which owned Givenchy, took the view that Sirop was not well enough known to the public and appointed John Galliano instead.

=== Dominique Sirop couture ===
In September 1996, Sirop opened his own couture house, and less than a year later he was admitted to the exclusive Chambre Syndicale de la Haute Couture Parisienne, making his house one of the ten official French couture fashion houses. This entitles its principal designer to be called a grand couturier.

Sirop has high-profile clients and produces fashion collections every season for more than one of the six major fashion weeks: Milan, Paris, London, Tokyo, Los Angeles, and New York. His designs are often featured in fashion magazines, including Vogue and Madame Figaro.

Since January 2000, Sirop's shop and atelier has been at 14, Rue du Faubourg Saint-Honoré, 75008 Paris, a historic building which includes its own theatre.

=== Ready-to-wear label ===
In 1998, Sirop entered into a partnership with Daimaru Stores of Japan to produce Dominique Sirop for Daimaru, a high-fashion prêt-à-porter (or ready-to-wear) label.

=== Notable clients ===
Those who are known to have bought Sirop's work include

- Queen Rania of Jordan
- Queen Sonja of Norway
- Joan Collins
- Judith Godrèche
- Nan Kempner
- Marie-Therese Perrin, wife of Cartier president Alain-Dominique Perrin
- Hélène David-Weill, president of Arts Décoratifs and wife of Lazard Frères, chairman Michel David-Weill

== Bibliography ==
- L'Élégance de Jacqueline Delubac, with Azzedine Alaïa, Jean-Claude Brialy, Pierre Cardin... (and al.), Adam Biro Ed., 1994. ISBN 2 876601389.
