= Nichihara Station =

Railway station in Tsuwano, Shimane Prefecture, Japan

Nichihara Station 日原駅
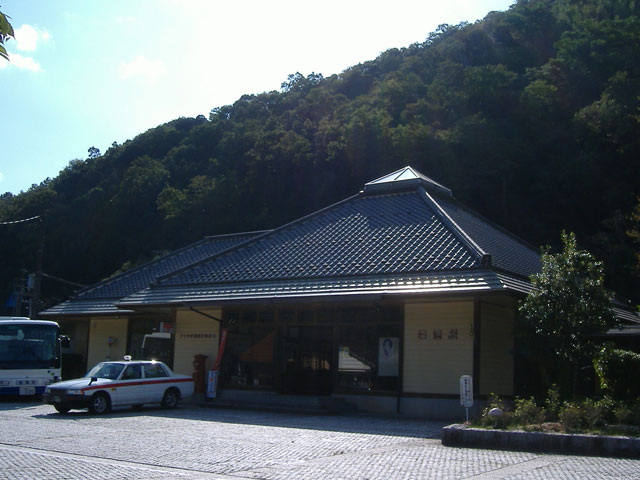
- Nichihara in October 2007

General information
- Location: Makurase, Tsuwano-cho, Kanoashi-gun, Shimane-ken 699-5207; Japan
- Coordinates: 34°31′57.55″N 131°49′54.79″E
- Owner: West Japan Railway Company
- Operator: West Japan Railway Company
- Line: Yamaguchi Line
- Distance: 72.8 km (45.2 miles) from Shin-Yamaguchi
- Platforms: 2 side platforms
- Tracks: 2
- Connections: Bus stop

Other information
- Status: Staffed
- Website: Official website

History
- Opened: 1 April 1924; 102 years ago

Passengers
- FY2020: 23

Services
Preceding station	JR West	Following station
Aonoyama towards Shin-Yamaguchi	Yamaguchi Line Local	Aohara towards Masuda
Location
- Location within Shimane Prefecture Location within Japan

Nichihara Station (日原駅, Nichihara-eki) is a passenger railway station located in the town of Tsuwano, Kanoashi District, Shimane Prefecture, Japan. It is operated by the West Japan Railway Company (JR West).

== Lines ==
Nichihara Station is served by the JR West Yamaguchi Line, and is located 72.8 kilometers from the terminus of the line at Shin-Yamaguchi.

== Station layout ==
The station consists of two opposed side platforms, connected with the station building by a level crossing. The station is staffed, and also contains the local post office and community center.

== Platforms ==
1	■ Yamaguchi Line	for Tsuwano and Yamaguchi
2	■ Yamaguchi Line	for Masuda

== History ==
Nichihara Station was opened on 1 April 1923 when the Yamaguchi Line was extended between Tsuwano Station and Iwami Masuda Station (now: Masuda Station). With the privatization of the Japan National Railway (JNR) on 1 April 1987, the station came under the aegis of the West Japan Railway Company (JR West).

== Passenger statistics ==
In fiscal 2020, the station was used by an average of 23 passengers daily.

== Surrounding area ==
- Nichihara Astronomical Observatory
- Japan National Route 9

== See also ==
- List of railway stations in Japan
