= Hanae Mori =

Japanese fashion designer (1926–2022)

- 森 英恵
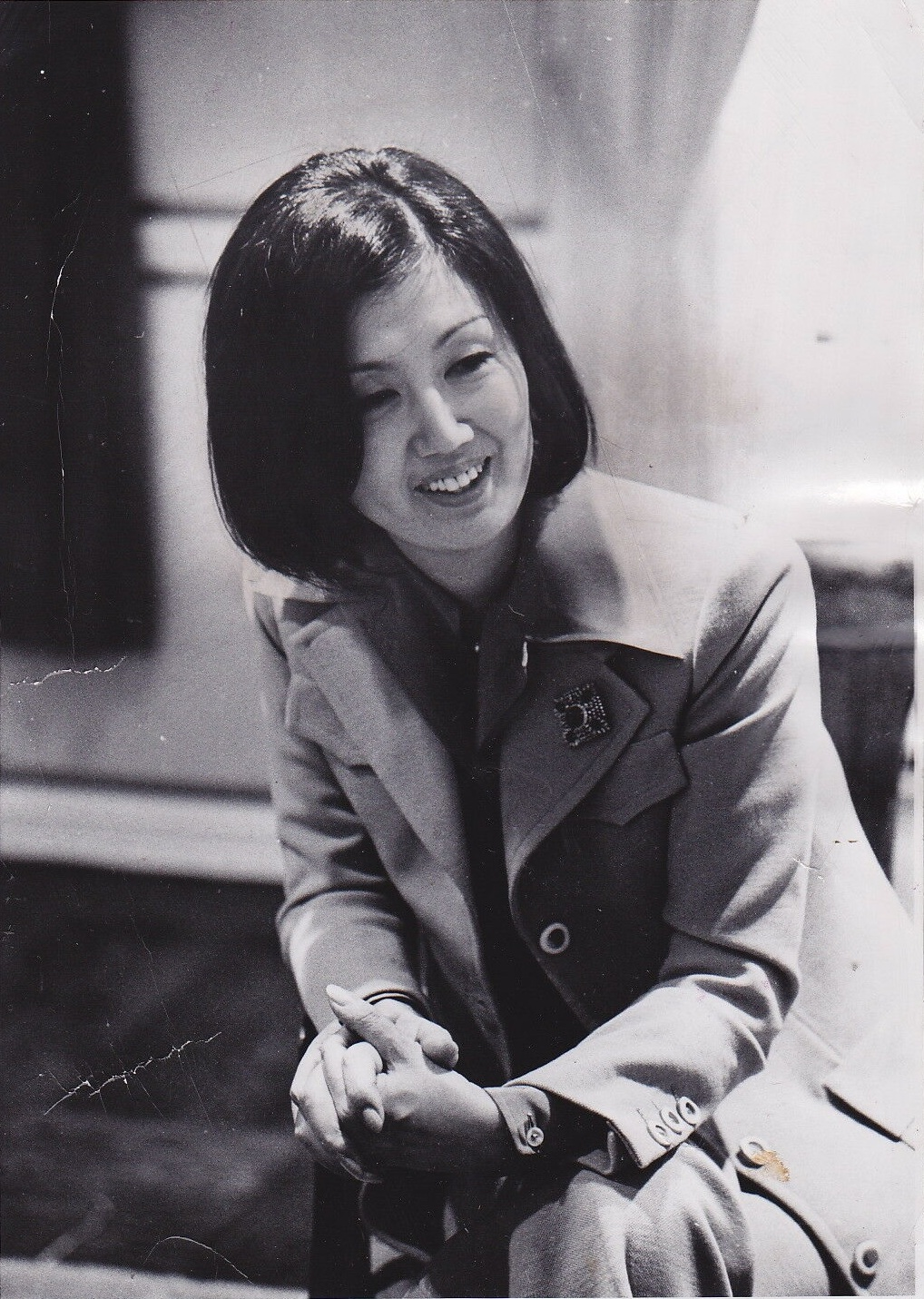
- Mori in 1974
- Pronunciation: Mori Hanae
- Born: 8 January 1926; Muikaichi, Shimane, Japan
- Died: 11 August 2022 (aged 96); Tokyo, Japan
- Education: Tokyo Women's Christian University
- Occupation: Fashion designer
- Years active: 1951–2004
- Spouse: Ken Mori (died 1996)
- Children: 2
- Relatives: Hikari Mori (granddaughter)
- Honours: Medal of Honor (Japan), purple ribbon (1988); Legion of Honour (France); Chevalier (1989); Officier (2002); Order of Culture (Japan) (1996)
- Website: hanaemoriparfums.com

Hanae Mori (Japanese: 森 英恵, Hepburn: Mori Hanae; /həˌnɑːeɪ ˈmɔːri/, 8 January 1926 – 11 August 2022) was a Japanese fashion designer. She was one of only two Japanese women to have presented her collections on the runways of Paris and New York, and the first Asian woman to be admitted as an official haute couture design house by the Fédération française de la couture in France. Her fashion house, opened in Japan in 1951, grew to become a $500 million international business by the 1990s.

== Career ==
Mori was born on 8 January 1926 in Muikaichi, Shimane. After graduating from Tokyo Women's Christian University, she married and attended dress-making school. She opened her first atelier, Hiyoshiya, in 1951, and over the next several years designed costumes for hundreds of movies. By 1960, Mori was a mother of two, and she was considering quitting her career in fashion. However, a fitting with Coco Chanel, where Mori was a client, inspired her to continue pursuing couture. In 1965, she presented her first New York City collection, "East Meets West." Twelve years later, she opened an haute couture showroom in Paris, leading to her 1977 appointment as a member of the Chambre syndicale de la couture parisienne.

Mori designed three consecutive uniforms for the flight attendants of Japan Air Lines (JAL). The first uniform was worn from 1967 to 1970; the second, which created a sensation by featuring a miniskirt, worn from 1970 to 1977; and the third worn from 1977 to 1988. From 1989 to 1996, Mori employed Dominique Sirop as a designer. He became a grand couturier in 1997. In 1992, Mori designed the official uniform for the Japanese Delegation to the Barcelona Olympics and, in 1994, the official uniform for the Japanese Delegation to the Lillehammer Olympics. Also in 1993, Masako, Crown Princess of Japan wore a sleeveless white gown designed by Mori for her wedding ceremony. Mori had the patronage of Masako, Crown Princess of Japan, Hillary Clinton, Nancy Reagan, Renata Tebaldi, and Monegasque Princess and actress Grace Kelly. In 1995, the brand launched a perfume line.

Amidst company financial struggles, Mori sold the ready-to-wear and licensed apparel operations in January 2002 to an investment group formed by Japanese trading company Mitsui & Co. and the Rothschild group in Britain. Opting for fast-track corporate rehabilitation, the company then applied to the Tokyo District Court for protection from its creditors on 30 May 2002, as it had ¥10,100,000,000 (US$81,000,000) in liabilities.

Mori announced her retirement in June 2004, stating that she would be closing her fashion house after the Haute Couture Show for Fall 2004 in Paris. She held her last fashion show in July of that year.

== Awards ==
In 1988, she received a Purple Ribbon Medal of Honor from the Government of Japan. In 1989 Mori was awarded the French Legion of Honor by President François Mitterrand of France. In 1996, Mori was awarded the Order of Culture by the Emperor of Japan.

== Personal life and death ==
In 1946, Mori met Ken Mori (1912–1996), a textile businessman who she later married. Ken died on 16 October 1996 of a heart attack. Mori had two sons with Ken named Akira and Kei. Both children help run Mori's business.

Mori died at her home in Tokyo on 11 August 2022, at the age of 96. No cause of death has been revealed.
