= Kanoashi District, Shimane =

District in Shimane prefecture, Japan

Coordinates: 34.460°N 131.881°E

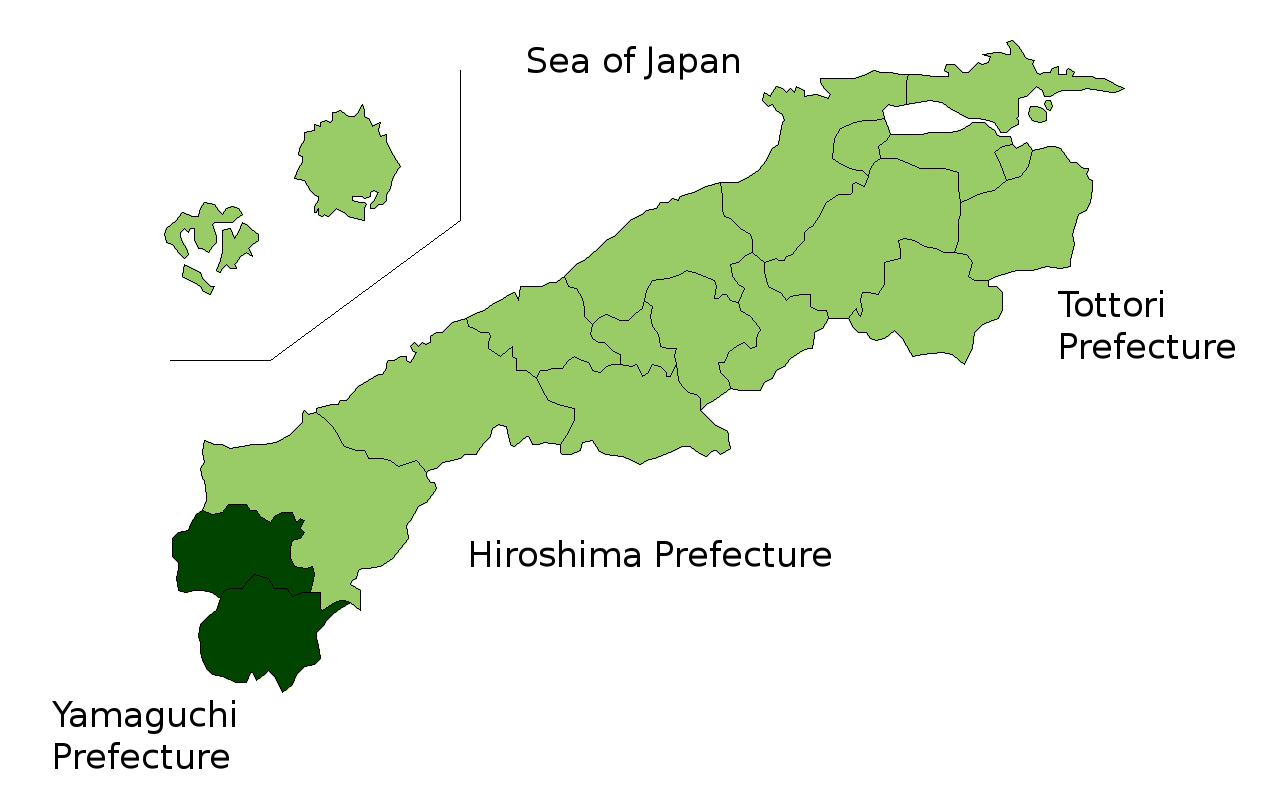
Location of Kanoashi District in Shimane Prefecture

Kanoashi (鹿足郡, Kanoashi-gun) is a district located in Shimane Prefecture, Japan.

As of 2003, the district has an estimated population of 17,879 and a density of 27.79 inhabitants per square kilometer (72.0/sq mi). The total area is 643.38 km^{2} (248.41 sq mi).

== Towns and villages ==
- Tsuwano
- Yoshika

== Mergers ==
- On September 25, 2005, the town of Nichihara merged into the town of Tsuwano.
- On October 1, 2005, the town of Muikaichi and the village of Kakinoki merged to form the new town of Yoshika.
