= Tsuwano, Shimane =

Tsuwano 津和野町
- Town
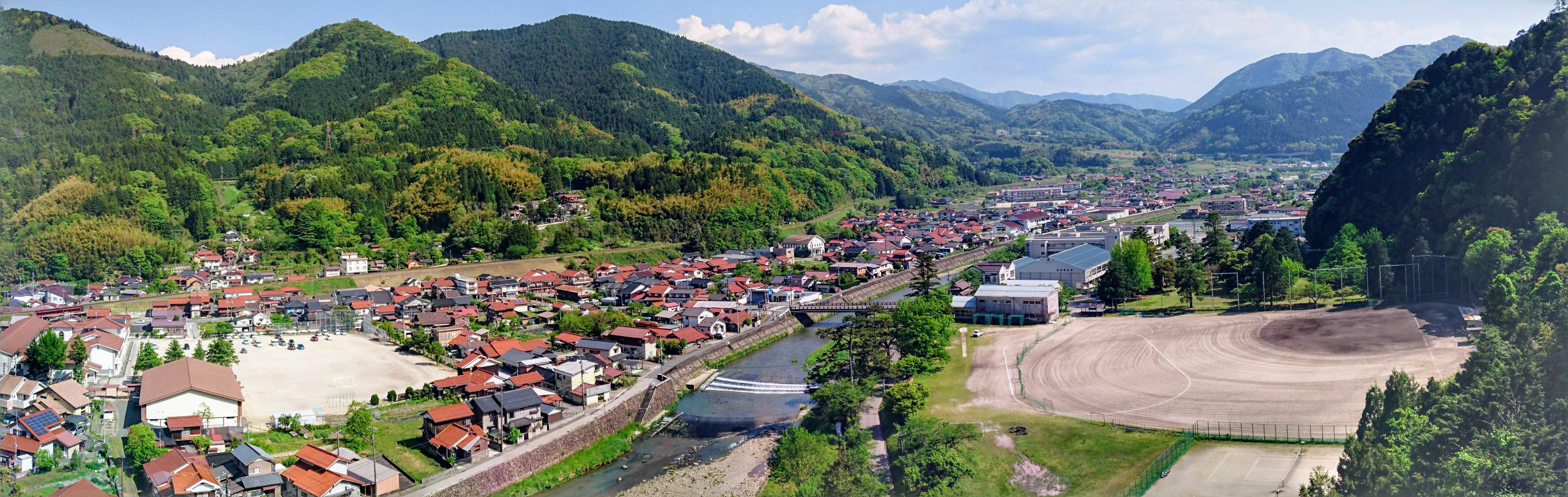
- Scenery of Tsuwano

- Flag Emblem
- Location of Tsuwano in Shimane Prefecture

- Location in Japan
- Coordinates: 34.541944°N 131.835278°E
- Country: Japan
- Region: Chūgoku; San'in
- Prefecture: Shimane
- District: Kanoashi

Government
  - Mayor: Hiroyuki Shitamori

Area
  - Total: 307.03 km^{2} (118.54 sq mi)

Population (June 30, 2023)
  - Total: 6,657
  - Density: 21.68/km^{2} (56.16/sq mi)
- Time zone: UTC+09:00 (JST)
- Postal code: 699-5292
- City hall address: 54-25 Nichihara, Tsuwano-chō, Kanoashi-gun, Shimane-ken 699-5292
- Climate: Cfa
- Website: www.town.tsuwano.lg.jp
- Symbols
- Bird: Egret
- Flower: Farfugium japonicum
- Tree: Camphor laurel

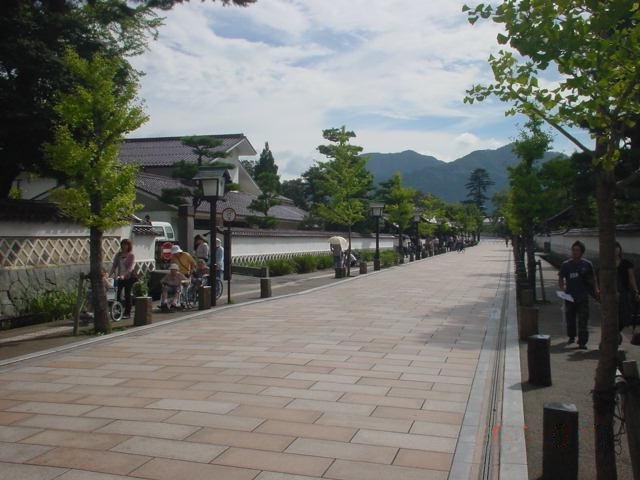
A street lined with historical buildings in Tsuwano

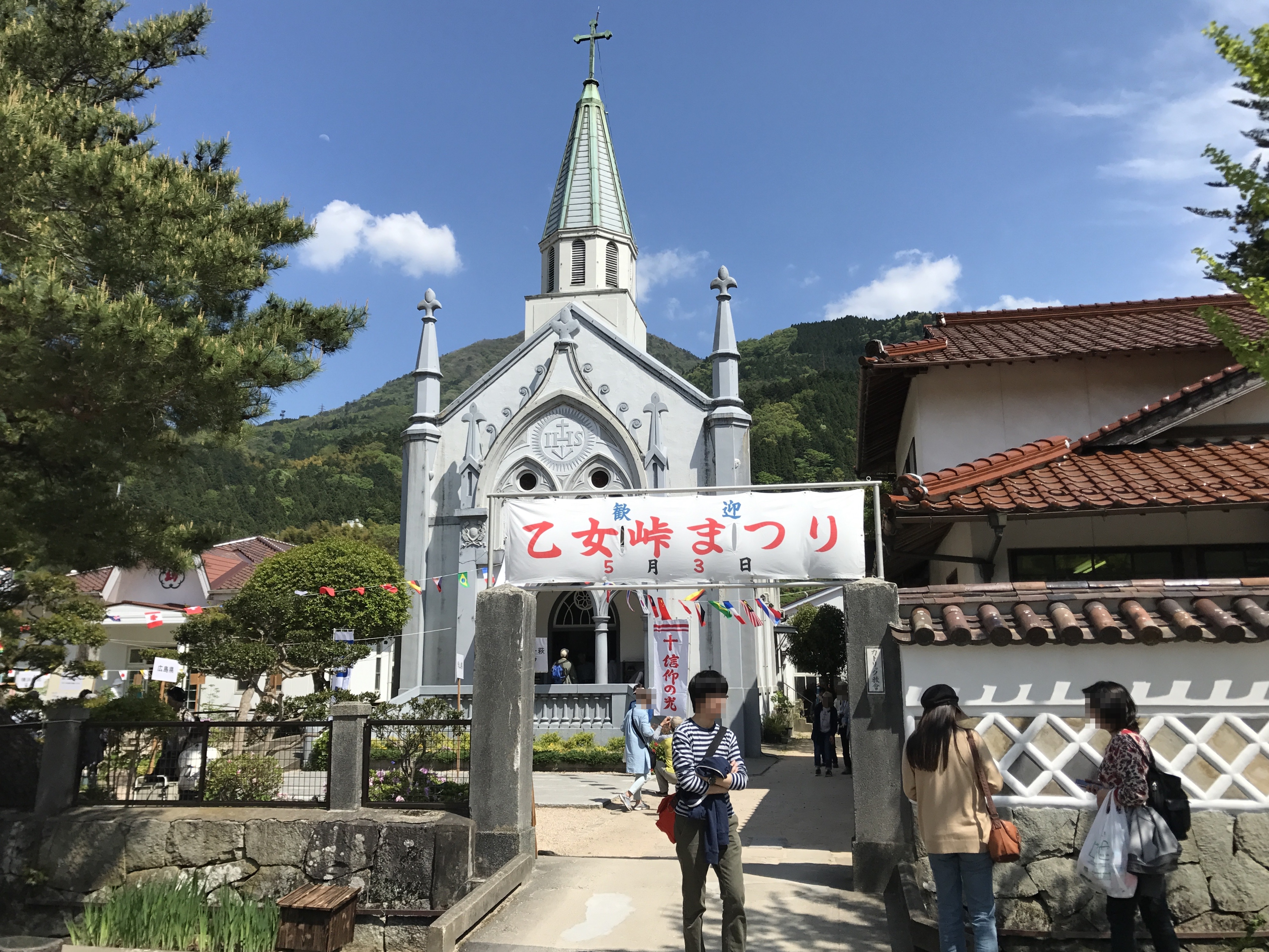
Tsuwano Catholic Church

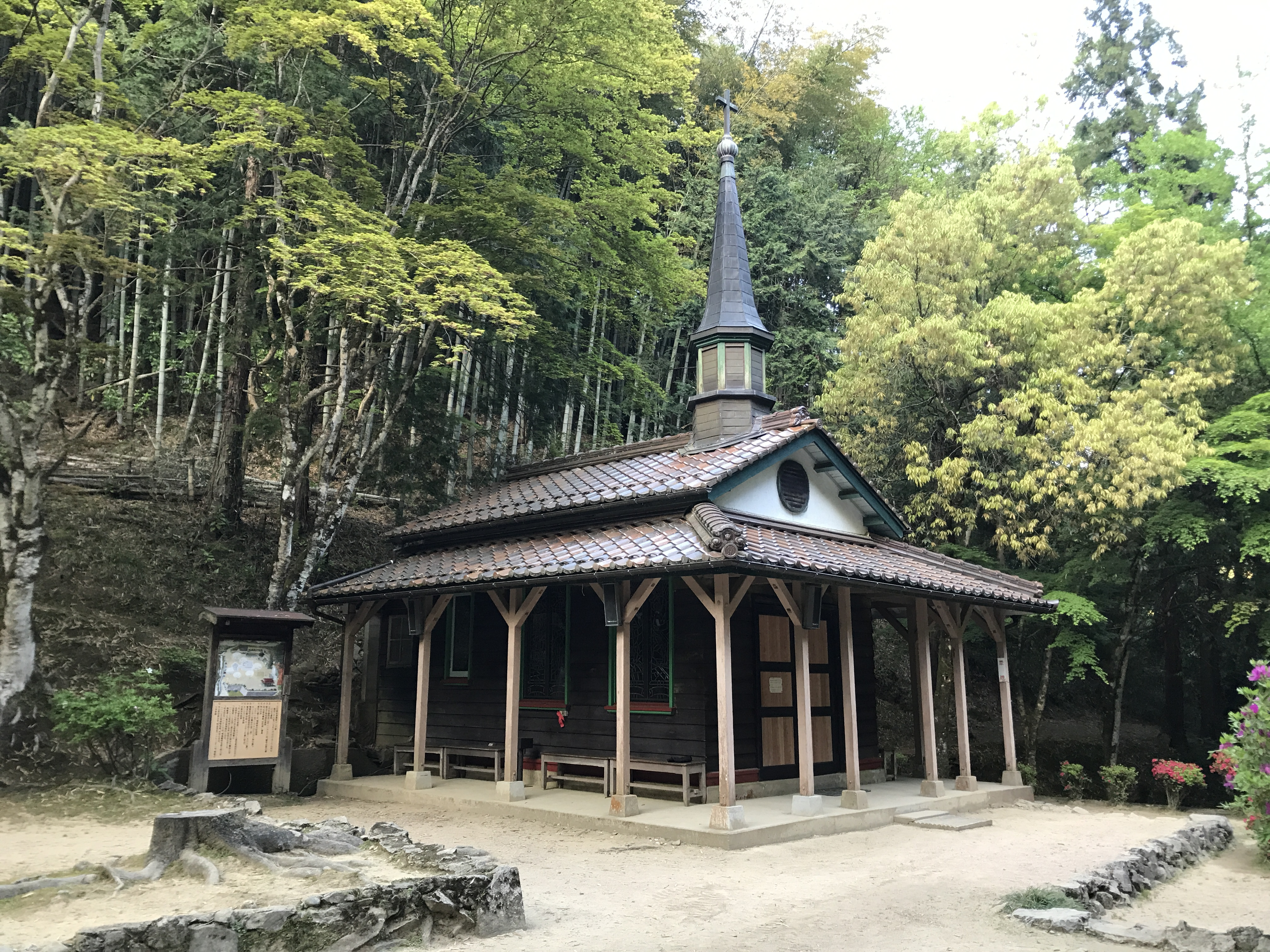
Santa Maria Chapel at Otome Pass

Tsuwano (津和野町, Tsuwano-chō) is a town located in Kanoashi District, Shimane Prefecture, Japan. As of 30 June 2023, the town had an estimated population of 6,657 in 3352 households and a population density of 22 persons per km^{2}. The total area of the town is 307.03 square kilometres (118.54 sq mi). Popularly called the "Little Kyoto of San'in," Tsuwano is known for its picturesque main street, "Tono-machi," which is an Important Preservation District for Groups of Traditional Building lined with Edo period buildings and Koi ponds. Its annual Yabusame festival on the second Sunday of April is a large tourist draw for the San'in region.

== Geography ==
Tsuwano is located in southwest Shimane Prefecture. The townscape that spreads out in a small basin between the mountains on a narrow flat land along the Tsuwano River.

== Neighboring municipalities ==
Shimane Prefecture

- Masuda
- Yoshika

Yamaguchi Prefecture

- Hagi
- Yamaguchi

=== Climate ===
Tsuwano has a humid subtropical climate (Köppen climate classification Cfa) with very warm summers and cool winters. Precipitation is abundant throughout the year. The average annual temperature in Tsuwano is 14.3 °C (57.7 °F). The average annual rainfall is 1,908.3 mm (75.13 in) with July as the wettest month. The temperatures are highest on average in August, at around 26.3 °C (79.3 °F), and lowest in January, at around 3.0 °C (37.4 °F). The highest temperature ever recorded in Tsuwano was 38.9 °C (102.0 °F) on 21 August 2024; the coldest temperature ever recorded was −13.1 °C (8.4 °F) on 28 February 1981.

Climate data for Tsuwano (1991−2020 normals, extremes 1978−present)
Month	Jan	Feb	Mar	Apr	May	Jun	Jul	Aug	Sep	Oct	Nov	Dec	Year
Record high °C (°F)	18.6 (65.5)	21.8 (71.2)	28.1 (82.6)	30.5 (86.9)	35.1 (95.2)	35.8 (96.4)	37.9 (100.2)	38.9 (102.0)	37.4 (99.3)	32.6 (90.7)	28.1 (82.6)	23.4 (74.1)	38.9 (102.0)
Mean daily maximum °C (°F)	7.8 (46.0)	9.4 (48.9)	13.7 (56.7)	19.7 (67.5)	24.7 (76.5)	27.4 (81.3)	30.8 (87.4)	32.2 (90.0)	27.8 (82.0)	22.4 (72.3)	16.6 (61.9)	10.4 (50.7)	20.2 (68.4)
Daily mean °C (°F)	3.0 (37.4)	3.9 (39.0)	7.4 (45.3)	12.8 (55.0)	17.8 (64.0)	21.5 (70.7)	25.5 (77.9)	26.3 (79.3)	21.9 (71.4)	15.8 (60.4)	10.2 (50.4)	5.1 (41.2)	14.3 (57.7)
Mean daily minimum °C (°F)	−0.6 (30.9)	−0.5 (31.1)	2.0 (35.6)	6.6 (43.9)	11.8 (53.2)	17.0 (62.6)	21.5 (70.7)	22.1 (71.8)	17.7 (63.9)	10.9 (51.6)	5.3 (41.5)	1.0 (33.8)	9.6 (49.2)
Record low °C (°F)	−7.9 (17.8)	−13.1 (8.4)	−4.6 (23.7)	−2.7 (27.1)	1.5 (34.7)	6.2 (43.2)	13.0 (55.4)	14.7 (58.5)	4.1 (39.4)	0.2 (32.4)	−2.3 (27.9)	−4.9 (23.2)	−13.1 (8.4)
Average precipitation mm (inches)	127.4 (5.02)	103.7 (4.08)	148.3 (5.84)	127.7 (5.03)	141.0 (5.55)	211.2 (8.31)	309.8 (12.20)	188.9 (7.44)	209.4 (8.24)	120.0 (4.72)	102.2 (4.02)	120.5 (4.74)	1,908.3 (75.13)
Average precipitation days (≥ 1.0 mm)	15.8	13.3	13.8	11.3	9.8	12.6	12.8	10.7	11.4	9.2	10.7	14.5	145.9
Mean monthly sunshine hours	70.2	87.5	138.3	178.6	200.4	136.0	150.7	180.4	137.4	148.4	114.1	76.8	1,619.2
Source: Japan Meteorological Agency

=== Demographics ===
Per Japanese census data, the population of Tsuwano in 2020 is 6,875 people. Tsuwano has been conducting censuses since 1920.

Historical population

Year	Pop.	±%
1920	20,285	—
1925	19,205	−5.3%
1930	20,171	+5.0%
1935	19,189	−4.9%
1940	18,872	−1.7%
1945	22,570	+19.6%
1950	22,499	−0.3%
1955	23,224	+3.2%
1960	21,157	−8.9%
1965	18,037	−14.7%
1970	15,412	−14.6%

Year	Pop.	±%
1975	13,957	−9.4%
1980	13,423	−3.8%
1985	13,002	−3.1%
1990	12,131	−6.7%
1995	11,389	−6.1%
2000	10,628	−6.7%
2005	9,515	−10.5%
2010	8,434	−11.4%
2015	7,653	−9.3%
2020	6,875	−10.2%
2025	6,100	−11.3%

Tsuwano population statistics

== History ==
The area of Tsuwano was part of ancient Iwami Province. During the Edo Period, the town developed as the jōkamachi of Tsuwano Domain, which was ruled by the Kamei clan for most of its history. In 1868, it was the site of particular gruesome persecutions of Kakure Kirishitan, who had been exiled to this location after their discovery and arrest in the Urakami Yoban Kuzure. After the Meiji restoration, the town of Tsuwano was established on within Kanoashi District, Shimane on April 1, 1889, with the creation of the modern municipalities system.

On September 25, 2005, the town of Nichihara was merged into Tsuwano.

== Government ==
Tsuwano has a mayor-council form of government with a directly elected mayor and a unicameral town council of 12 members. Tsuwano, collectively with the town of Yoshika, contributes one member to the Shimane Prefectural Assembly. In terms of national politics, the town is part of the Shimane 2nd district of the lower house of the Diet of Japan.

== Economy ==
Tsuwano is a very rural area, with an economy based on agriculture and forestry. Tourism also plays a very important factor in the local economy. As it is close to Yamaguchi Prefecture, many tourists who come to Tsuwano also visit Hagi on the Sea of Japan and Yamaguchi at the same time, and Tsuwano is often mistaken as being in Yamaguchi prefecture.

== Education ==
Tsuwano has four public elementary school and two public junior high schools operated by the city government, and one public high school operated by the Shimane Prefectural Board of Education.

== Transportation ==
=== Railway ===
JR West (JR West) - Yamaguchi Line

- Tsuwano - Aonoyama - Nichihara - Aohara - Higashi-Aohara

=== Highways ===
- National Route 9
- National Route 187

== Sister cities ==
- Mitte-district, Berlin, Germany, from August 1995

== Local attractions ==
- Otometoge Maria Seido, dedicated in 1951 and is part of a memorial for 37 Japanese Christians persecuted and tortured in Tsuwano by the government during the Edo and Meiji periods.
- Taikodani Inari Jinja, with its 1000 vermilion torii gates
- Tsuwano Castle ruins, a National Historic Site

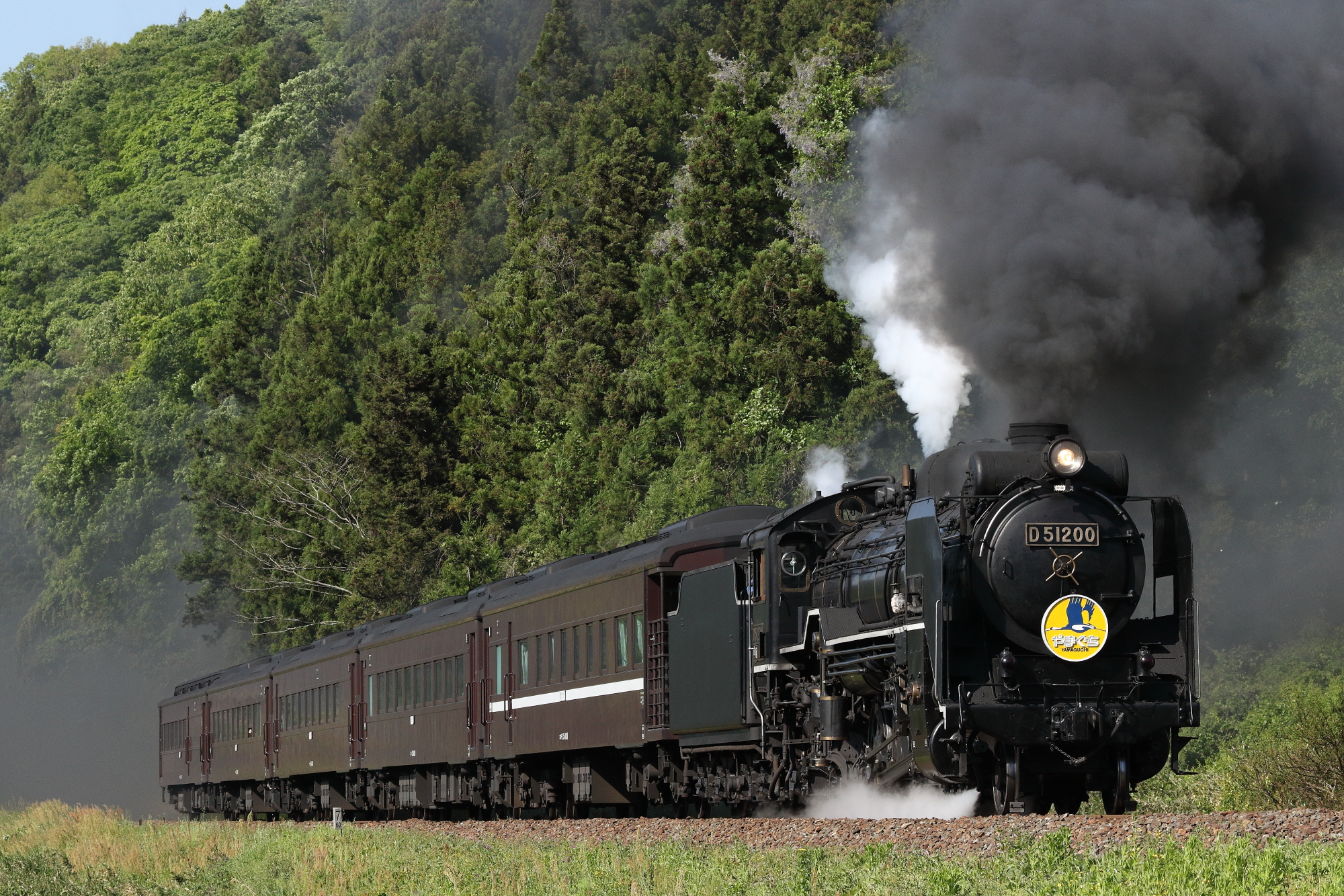
The SL Yamaguchi steam train

=== SL Yamaguchi steam locomotive ===
A popular tourist destination, Tsuwano is served by the steam locomotive Yamaguchi, which runs once daily on weekends, national holidays, and certain other days between March and November (daily in August) on the Yamaguchi Line between Shin-Yamaguchi Station to Tsuwano. It stops for about three hours in Tsuwano before returning to Shin-Yamaguchi station. The train is usually pulled by a C57 locomotive, but a D51 does the job on several weekdays between July and September, and both engines are linked in a double-header configuration on weekends in August. As of 2026, the train is now primarily hauled by the D51 due to the C57 undergoing maintenance.

The train consists of five 35 series passenger cars, modeled on those from the Shōwa era, with the interiors replicating this in as much detail as possible. The rearmost car has an outdoor observation deck. A scene in director Masahiro Shinoda’s Spy Sorge, a 2003 movie about Soviet spy Richard Sorge, was shot on the train for period effect.

== Notable people from Tsuwano ==
- Nishi Amane, philosopher
- Mitsumasa Anno, illustrator and author of children's books
- Akiko Kamei, politician
- Hisaoki Kamei, politician
- Shisei Kuwabara, photographer
- Mori Ōgai, novelist, doctor, government minister. Mori's tomb is at Yomei-ji in Tsuwano, built in 1420 and known as one of the two great Sōtō sect temples in Japan
