= Niho =

Niho may refer to:

- Bungo Province, a former Japanese province
- Niho Station, Yamaguchi, Yamaguchi Prefecture, Japan, a railway station
- Akira Niho (born 1990), Japanese former Nippon Professional Baseball pitcher

== See also ==
- Nīhoa, a Hawaiian island
- Nihoa (spider), a genus of trapdoor spiders, named after the island
