= Masahiro Nakatani =

Japanese baseball player (born 1994)

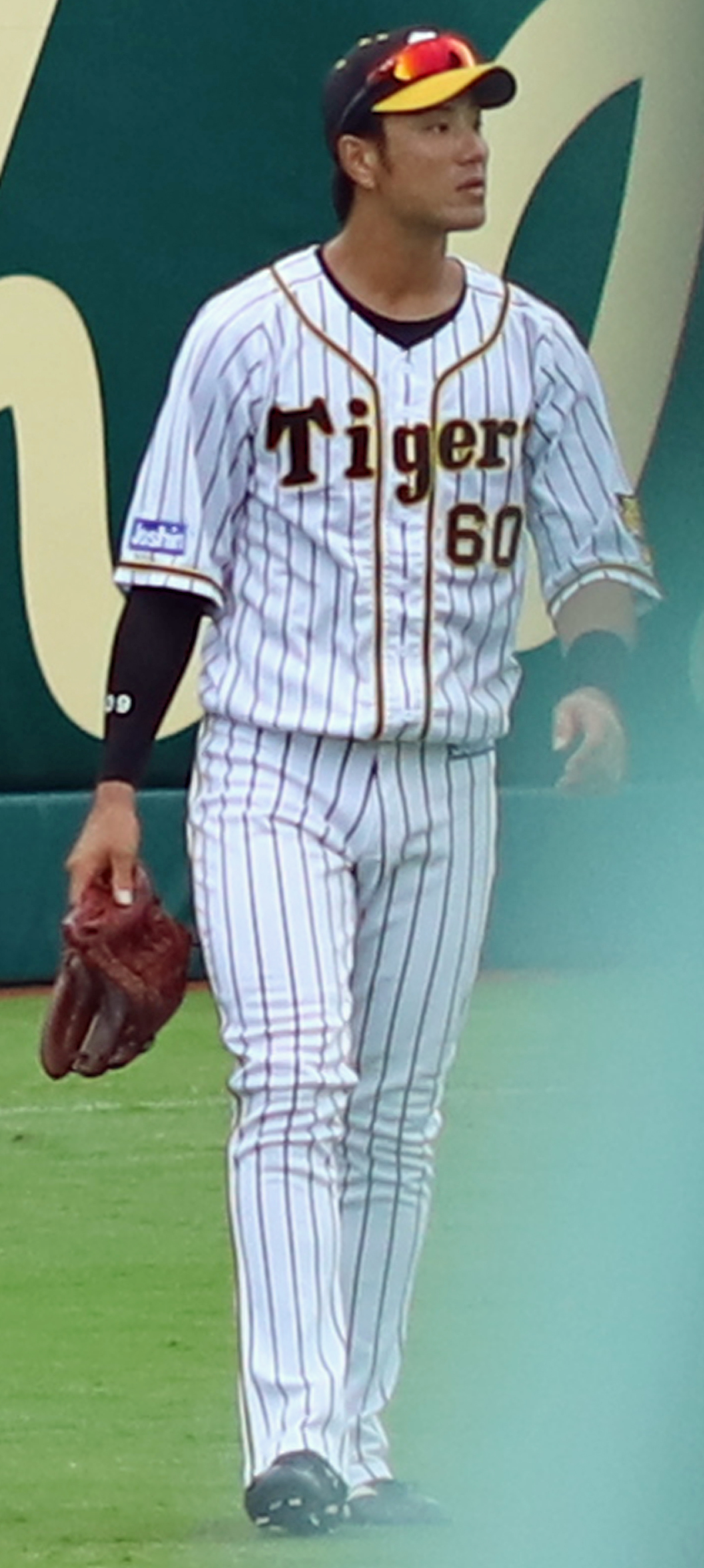

Fukuoka SoftBank Hawks – No. 018
- Outfielder / Coach
- Born: January 5, 1993 (age 33); Ogōri, Fukuoka, Japan
- Batted: Right Threw: Right

NPB debut
- August 23, 2012, for the Hanshin Tigers

Last NPB appearance
- August 7, 2022, for the Hanshin Tigers

Career statistics
- Batting average: .230
- Home runs: 38
- Runs batted in: 140
- Stats at Baseball Reference

Teams
- As player: Hanshin Tigers (2011–2021); Fukuoka SoftBank Hawks (2021–2022); As coach: Fukuoka SoftBank Hawks (2024–present)

Career highlights and awards
- As coach: Japan Series champion (2025)

Masahiro Nakatani (中谷 将大, Nakatani Masahiro; born December 19, 1994) is a Japanese former professional baseball outfielder and first baseman, and current fielder's rehabilitation coach for the Fukuoka SoftBank Hawks of Nippon Professional Baseball (NPB). He played in NPB for the Hanshin Tigers and the Hawks.

== Early baseball career ==
A native of Fukuoka, he began playing as a catcher for the Mikuni Honeys in grade school, then went on to join the Futsukaichi Lions in junior high where he got to participate in national tournaments.

Upon entering high school, he secured the outfielder post for the Fukuoka Koudai Joto High School. He was elected as team captain in his second year, but his team never made it past the elimination rounds to summer Koshien. He attended the same high school as fellow Tiger's teammate Ryutaro Umeno who was a year ahead, and like Umeno, he started as an outfielder and graduated as a catcher.

== Professional career ==
=== Active player era ===
==== Hanshin Tigers ====
Nakatani was selected as the Hanshin Tigers' 3rd round pick in the 2010 Nippon Professional Baseball draft. He signed as a catcher on a contract of 50 million yen and an annual salary of 6 million. He was given the jersey number 60.

2011

In 2011, Nakatani played in 23 Western League games (minors) and batted .261 with 4 RBIs. Because he played mostly as an outfielder and not as a catcher, they changed his training regimen from a catcher to an outfielder at the end of the season.

2012

Nakatani spent most of the 2012 season playing in the minors. He was selected to play in the mid-season Fresh All Star Game on July 18, and was selected as the game's MVP when he scored 2 hits and 3 RBIs. On August 23, he debuted in his 1st official game as the starting right fielder in the match against the Chunichi Dragons at the Kurashiki Muscat Stadium. He appeared in 5 more games, but he failed to record a hit in any of them. He finished the season in the minors, with a .225 batting average, 3 home runs and 27 RBIs.

2013

In 2013, the Tigers officially changed Nakatani's position from catcher to outfielder. He spent the entire season in the farm, and batted .201 in 100 games, with 31 RBIs and 2 home runs.

2014

Nakatani also didn't appear in any main squad matches in this year, and batted his worst at .190 in 93 minor league games. His home run count improved to 7.

2015

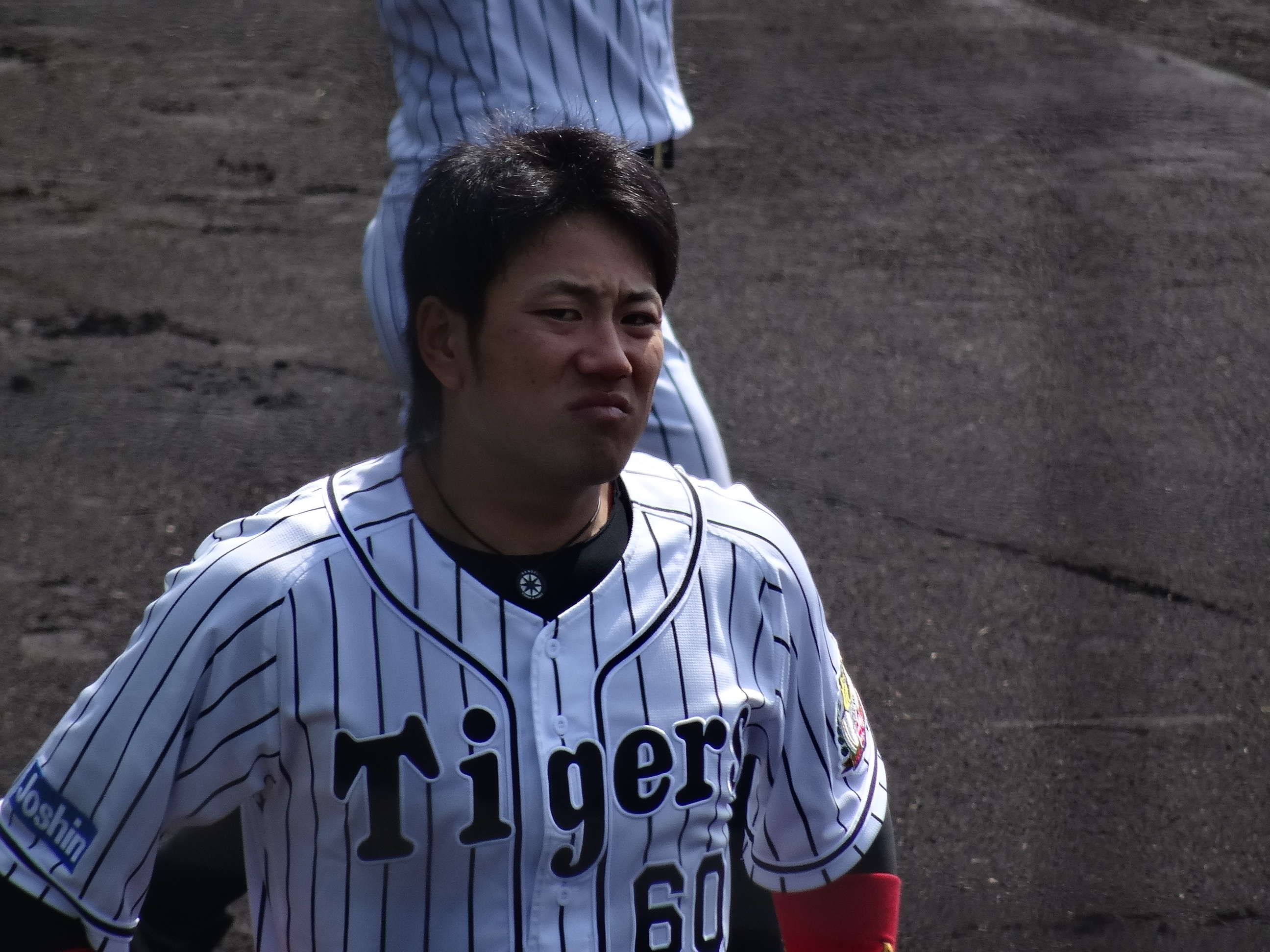
Nakatani in 2015.

Nakatani's improved performance in the minors early in the season finally earned him a spot in the main squad in a match against the Hiroshima Toyo Carp on May 8. He recorded his first official hit as a pro on May 9, but when he went hitless in the next matches, he got sent back to the farm on May 15. He continued to perform well in Western League games, and even got selected as the League MVP of the Month in July. In all his 94-game appearances, he recorded an average of .290 with 9 home runs and 40 RBIs, and was named the Western League's MVP of the season.

2016

Nakatani spent the earlier half of the 2016 season in the farm, where new batting coach and Tigers legend Masayuki Kakefu helped him undergo training to improve his batting form. His efforts paid off when he got called to play with the main squad in June. He recorded his first career RBI on June 19, and his first career home run a few days after. His appearances gradually increased until October, mostly as a center fielder or as a pinch hitter, and he finished the season with 14 RBIs, 4 home runs and a batting average of .266 in 64 games.

2017

Nakatani had a shaky start early in the 2017 season as he competed with young guns Shun Takayama and Fumihito Haraguchi for regular playing time in the outfield or at first base. His breakout performance started in May when he went on a hitting spree and reached 5 home runs by the 3rd week. He was rewarded by being assigned the clean up spot for the first time in a May 28 match against the Yokohama DeNA BayStars, and continued to be a regular starting player in the next couple of months. He went 5-for-5 against the Saitama Seibu Lions on June 15, and recorded two hits and two RBIs including a two-run home run against Yomiuri on July 9. This earned him the Sanspo Excellent Player Award for his performance during the Sanspo's Hanshin Tigers Gekirei Series (June 13 to July 12). By July 23, he was leading the team in home runs batted in (10 HRs). He continued to hit well, and even hit home runs in 3 consecutive matches against the Tokyo Yakult Swallows on August 22. In a September 18 match against the Hiroshima Toyo Carp at Koshien Stadium, he recorded his 20th home run of the season in the fourth inning against Yusuke Nomura. He became the first Hanshin right-handed hitting lifer (a player who has played with only one team) to reach 20 home runs since Osamu Hamanaka hit 20 in 2006 (Hamanaka was a lifer at the time he recorded twenty home runs). In 133 main squad game appearances, he led the team in RBIs and home runs (61 RBIs, 20 home runs), with 99 hits and an OPS of 0.697. His performance earned him a 12 million pay raise, making an estimated annual salary of 36 million yen for 2018.

2018

Nakatani fell into a slump during spring camp in 2018 and batting only .143 during the exhibition games. Nakatanie failed to make it into the main squad when the season started. His slump continued in the farm, (39 games, .197 average, 3 home runs), but when the main squad needed batting reinforcement, he got called to play on May 22. In the 9th inning of a May 26 game against the Yomiuri Giants, with 2 outs and a runner on 2nd, Nakatani notched his 1st career walk off hit at Koshien. From June onwards however, his performance began to deteriorate, and with the improving performance of other outfielders, his starts gradually decreased. He only appeared in a total of 77 games, hit 26 RBIs with only 5 home runs.

2019

Nakatani played in 62 games for Hanshin in 2019, also playing in 43 games for the farm team. In 131 plate appearances, Nakatani posted a tepid .181/.264/.379 slash with 6 home runs and 19 RBI.

2020

In 2020, the season was delayed because of the COVID-19 pandemic. Nakatani spent the majority of the year with Hanshin's main team, logging a .215/.267/.304 batting line with 2 home runs and 16 RBI in 70 games.

2021

Nakatani began the 2021 season with Hanshin's farm team after poor performance in the seasons prior. With the farm team, Nakatani posted a .266 average with 5 home runs and 26 RBI.

==== Fukuoka SoftBank Hawks ====
On July 2, 2021, Nakatani was traded to the Fukuoka SoftBank Hawks in exchange for Akira Niho.

In 2021 season, he never had a chance to play in the First League.

2022

On May 6, 2022, Nakatani made his first appearance as a Hawks player and recorded his first hit after moving to the 21. On May 6, 2022, He hit a dramatic two-run homer in the top of the ninth inning with one out and a runner on first. In 2022 season, he batted .214 with one home run in 16 games.

October 17, 2022, the Hawks announced he was a free agent.

On January 20, 2023, Nakatani announced his retirement from active player. He is also scheduled to be on the team's staff starting next season.

=== After retirement ===
On October 31, 2023, Nakatani became the fielder's rehabilitation coach of the Fukuoka Softbank Hawks.
