= Miyano Station =

Railway station in Yamaguchi, Yamaguchi Prefecture, Japan

Miyano Station 宮野駅
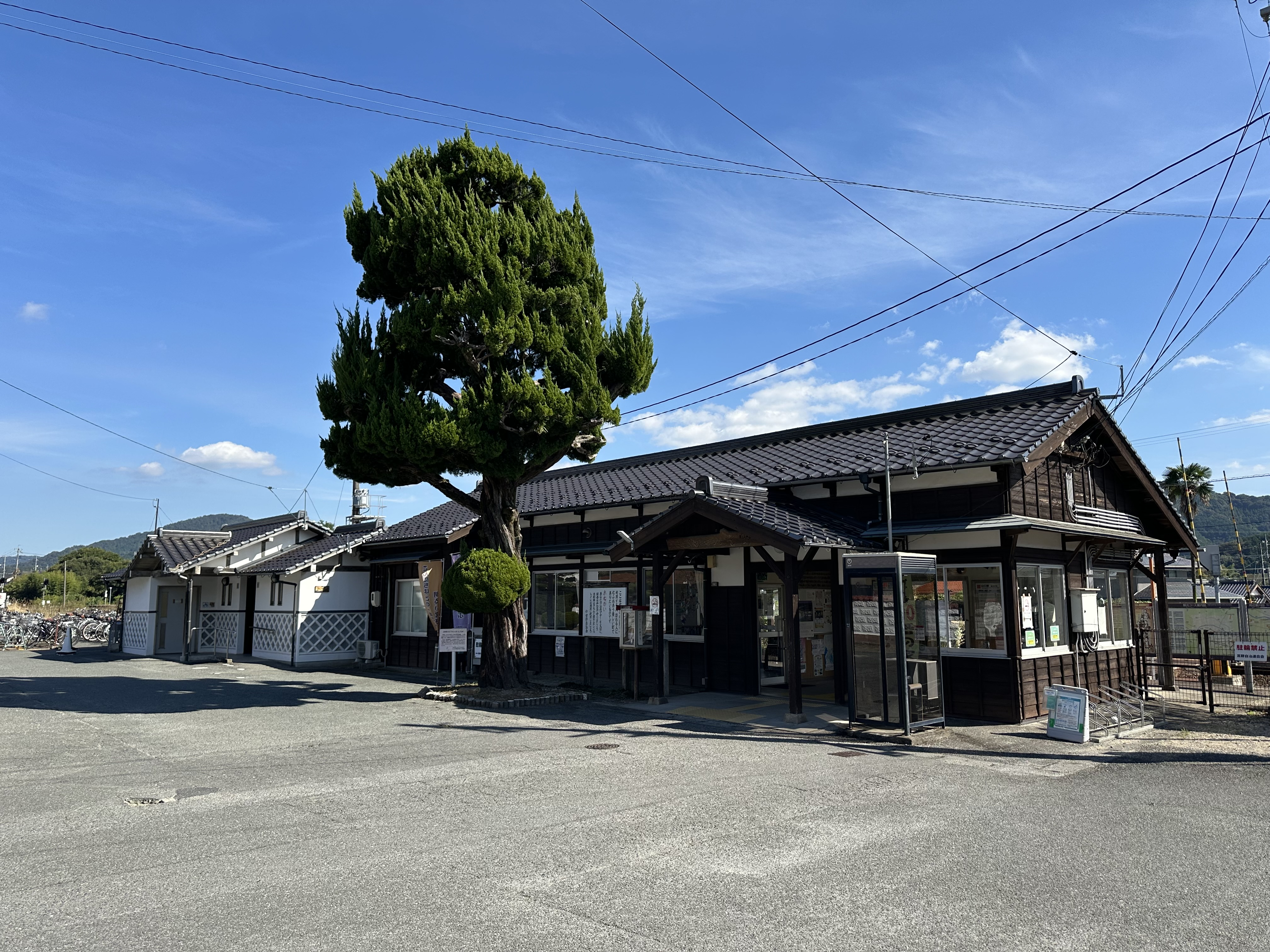
- Miyano Station in October 2025

General information
- Location: 2-chōme-8 Orimoto, Yamaguchi-shi, Yamaguchi-ken 753-0022; Japan
- Coordinates: 34°11′29.07″N 131°29′54.19″E
- Owner: West Japan Railway Company
- Operator: West Japan Railway Company
- Line: Yamaguchi Line
- Distance: 15.5 km (9.6 miles) from Shin-Yamaguchi
- Platforms: 1 island platform
- Tracks: 2
- Connections: Bus stop

Other information
- Status: Unstaffed
- Website: Official website

History
- Opened: 1 July 1917; 109 years ago

Passengers
- FY2020: 272

Services
Preceding station	JR West	Following station
Kami-Yamaguchi towards Shin-Yamaguchi	Yamaguchi Line Local	Niho towards Masuda
Location
- Location within Yamaguchi Prefecture Location within Japan

Miyano Station (宮野駅, Miyano-eki) is a passenger railway station located in the city of Yamaguchi, Yamaguchi Prefecture, Japan. It is operated by the West Japan Railway Company (JR West).

== Lines ==
Miyano Station is served by the JR West Yamaguchi Line, and is located 15.5 kilometers from the terminus of the line at Shin-Yamaguchi.

== Station layout ==
The station consists of one unnumbered island platforms connected to the station building by a level crossing. The station is unattended.

=== Platforms ===
opposite side	■ Yamaguchi Line	for Yamaguchi and Shin-Yamaguchi
station side	■ Yamaguchi Line	for Yamaguchi and Tsuwano

== History ==
Miyano Station was opened on 1 July 1917. With the privatization of the Japan National Railway (JNR) on 1 April 1987, the station came under the aegis of the West Japan railway Company (JR West).

== Passenger statistics ==
In fiscal 2020, the station was used by an average of 272 passengers daily.

== Surrounding area ==
- Yamaguchi Prefectural University
- Japan Ground Self-Defense Force Exercise Area
- Yamaguchi Municipal Miyano Elementary School
- Yamaguchi City Miyano Junior High School

== See also ==
- List of railway stations in Japan
