= Akira Niho =

Japanese baseball player (born 1990)

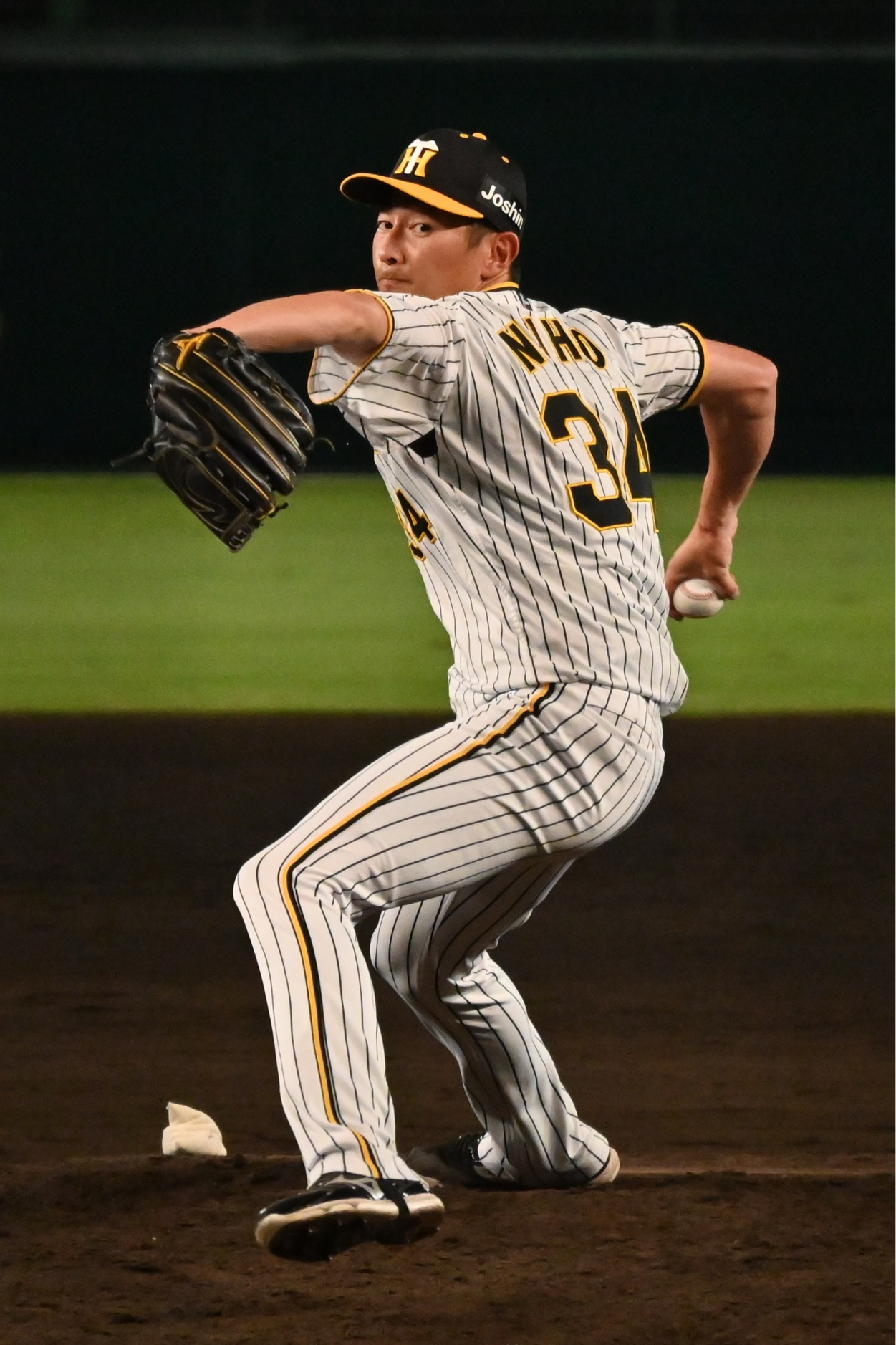
- Niho with the Hanshin Tigers
- Pitcher
- Born: May 18, 1990 (age 36); Yukuhashi, Fukuoka, Japan
- Batted: Right Threw: Right

NPB debut
- September 13, 2012, for the Fukuoka SoftBank Hawks

Last NPB appearance
- August 29, 2024, for the Chiba Lotte Marines

NPB statistics
- Win–loss record: 13–12
- ERA: 4.73
- Strikeouts: 115
- Stats at Baseball Reference

Teams
- Fukuoka SoftBank Hawks (2009–2021); Hanshin Tigers (2021–2023); Chiba Lotte Marines (2024)

Career highlights and awards
- 4× Japan Series champion (2015, 2018–2020)

Akira Niho (二保 旭, Niho Akira; born May 18, 1990) is a Japanese former professional baseball pitcher. He played in Nippon Professional Baseball (NPB) for the Fukuoka SoftBank Hawks, Hanshin Tigers, and Chiba Lotte Marines.

== Professional career ==
=== Fukuoka SoftBank Hawks ===
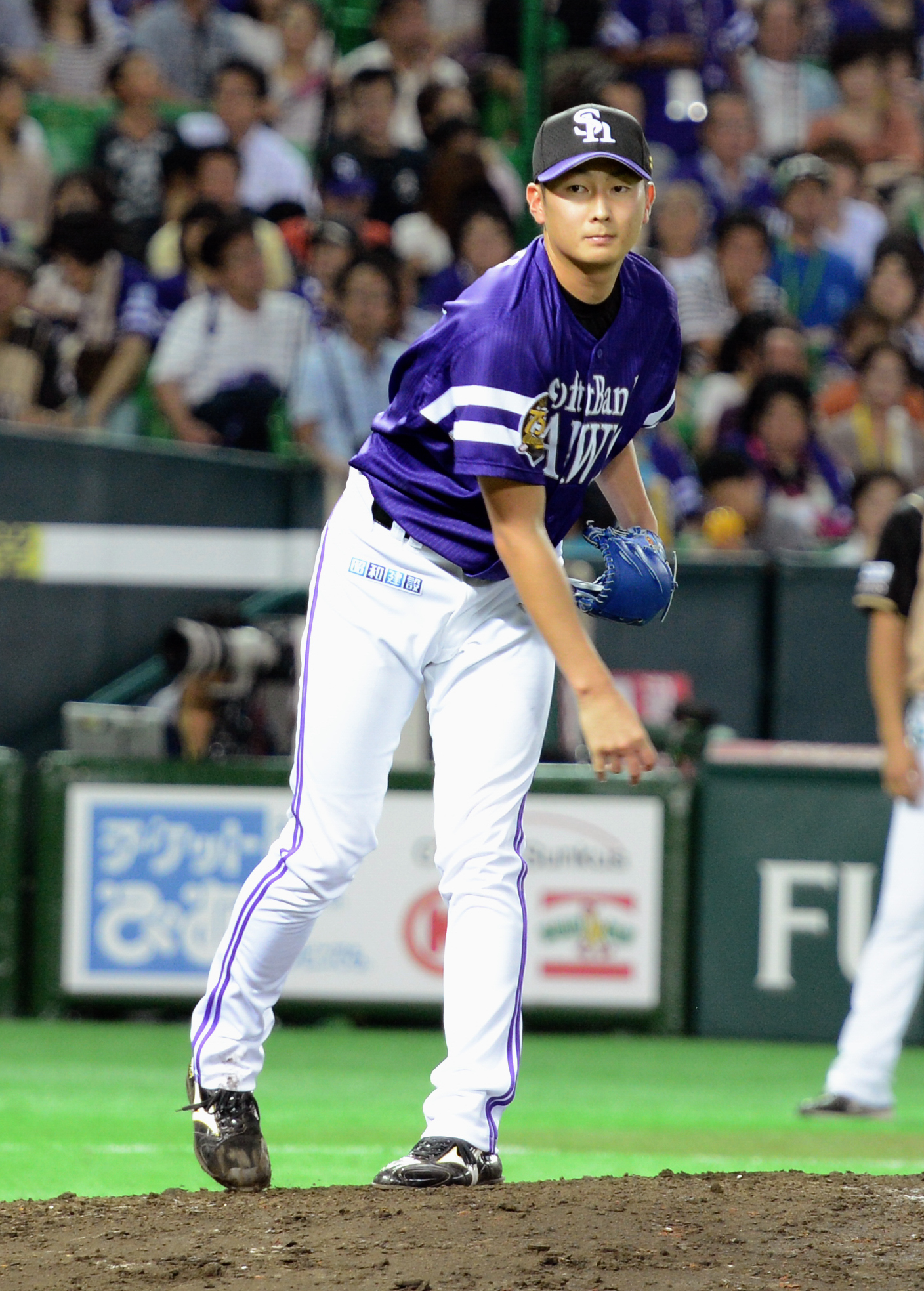
Niho with the Fukuoka SoftBank Hawks

On October 30, 2008, Niho was drafted as a developmental player by the Fukuoka SoftBank Hawks in the 2008 Nippon Professional Baseball draft.

==== 2009–2015 ====
From 2009 to mid-2012, Niho played in informal matches against the Shikoku Island League Plus's teams and amateur baseball teams, and played in the Western League of NPB's second league. In November 2011, he became a free agent at the expiration of his contract according to the regulations of the developmental player system, but was re-signed.

On July 30, 2012, he signed a 5 million yen re-contract with the Fukuoka SoftBank Hawks as a registered player under control. On September 13, Niho pitched his debut game against the Tohoku Rakuten Golden Eagles.

In 2013, Niho recorded a 6.00 ERA in 5 games with Fukuoka, spending the majority of the year at the farm. He spent the entirety of the 2014 season at the farm, posting a 2.91 ERA in 33 games.

On May 3, 2015, Niho recorded his first of the 2015 season. In 2015, he finished the regular season with a 6–1 record and 3.25 ERA to go along with 5 holds and 28 strikeouts in 52 2/3 innings across 44 appearances. Additionally, Niho won the 2015 Japan Series with Fukuoka.

==== 2016–2020 ====
On April 19, 2016, Niho underwent Tommy John surgery and missed the remainder of the year. Niho appeared in 16 games with the farm team in 2017, without playing for Fukuoka.

On April 10, 2018, Niho pitched in the Pacific League against the Hokkaido Nippon-Ham Fighters for the first time in three years. For the 2018 season, he finished the regular season with a 1–0 record and 5.34 ERA with 4 holds, 1 save, and 17 strikeouts in 30 1/3 innings of work across 35 appearances. Niho won the 2018 Japan Series with Fukuoka.

In 2019, Niho finished the regular season with a 1–4 record and 3.99 ERA with 15 strikeouts in 38 1/3 innings across 8 games. He won the 2019 Japan Series, his third championship victory of his career.

In a match against the Tohoku Rakuten Golden Eagles on July 11, 2020, Niho pitched his longest outing of his career, going 7 innings to become the winning pitcher. In 2020, he finished the regular season with a 4–5 record and 4.92 ERA with 28 strikeouts in 56 2/3 innings of work across 12 games. He won the 2020 Japan Series against the Yomiuri Giants, his fourth Japan Series win of his career. Niho made only 2 appearances for Fukuoka in 2021, posting a 4.76 ERA in 11 1/3 innings pitched.

=== Hanshin Tigers ===
On July 2, 2021, Niho was traded to the Hanshin Tigers in exchange for Masahiro Nakatani.

=== Chiba Lotte Marines ===
On November 28, 2023, Niho signed a development contract with the Chiba Lotte Marines. He made 8 appearances for Lotte in 2024, struggling to a 12.19 ERA with 4 strikeouts across 10 1/3 innings pitched. On November 3, 2024, Niho announced his retirement from professional baseball.
