= Niho Station =

Railway station in Yamaguchi, Yamaguchi Prefecture, Japan

Niho Station 仁保駅
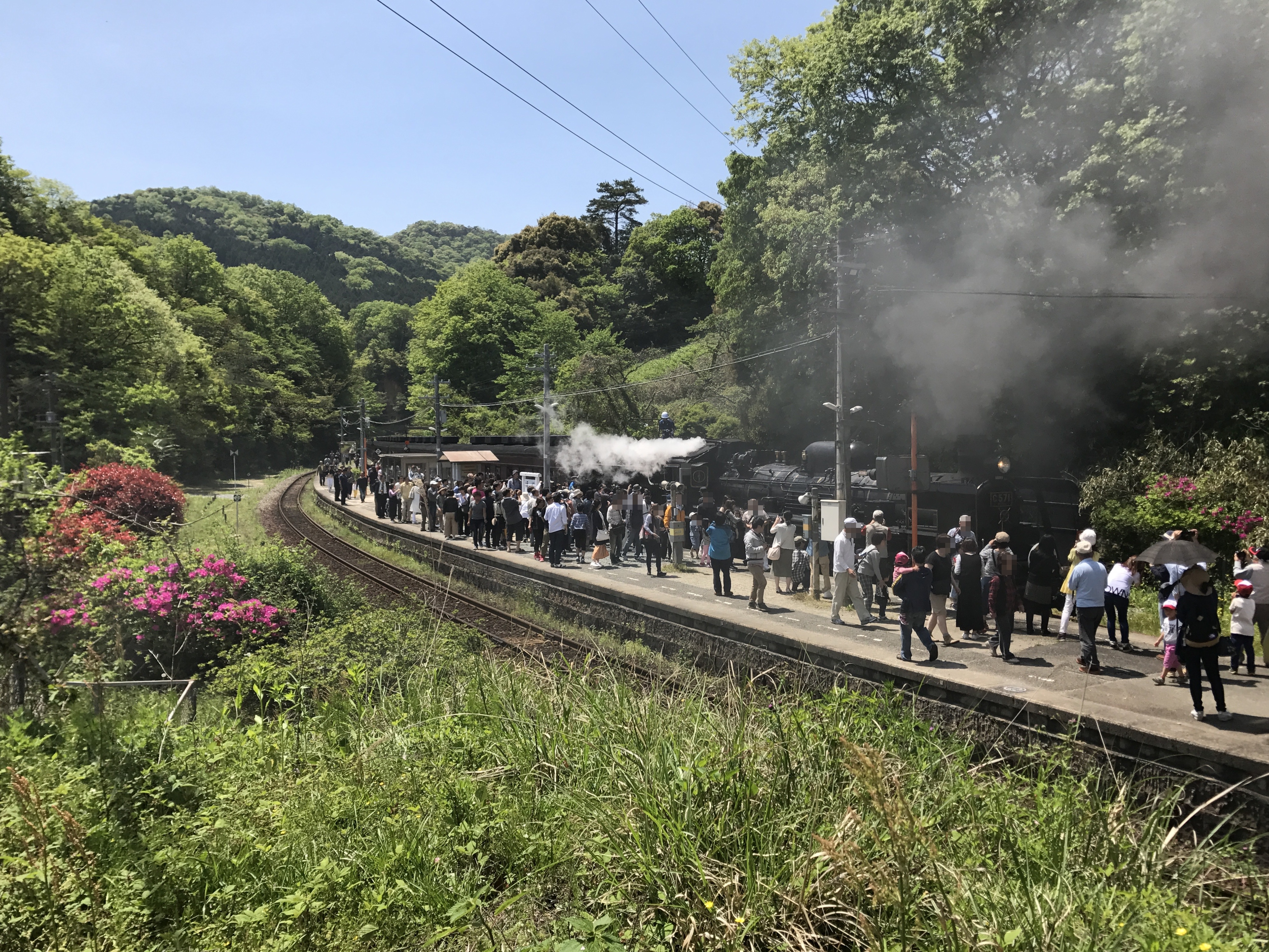
- Niho Station in 2017

General information
- Location: Nihoshimogo, Yamaguchi-shi, Yamaguchi-ken753-0303; Japan
- Coordinates: 34°13′0.08″N 131°32′10.67″E
- Owner: West Japan Railway Company
- Operator: West Japan Railway Company
- Line: Yamaguchi Line
- Distance: 20.2 km (12.6 miles) from Shin-Yamaguchi
- Platforms: 1 side platform
- Tracks: 2
- Connections: Bus stop

Other information
- Status: Unstaffed
- Website: Official website

History
- Opened: 1 July 1917; 109 years ago

Passengers
- FY2020: 36

Services
Preceding station	JR West	Following station
Miyano towards Shin-Yamaguchi	Yamaguchi Line Local	Shinome towards Masuda
Location
- Location within Yamaguchi Prefecture Location within Japan

Niho Station (仁保駅, Niho-eki) is a passenger railway station in Yamaguchi, Yamaguchi Prefecture, Japan. It is operated by the West Japan Railway Company (JR West).

== Lines ==
Niho Station is served by the JR West Yamaguchi Line and located 20.2 kilometers from the line's terminus at Shin-Yamaguchi.

== Station layout ==
The station consists of one ground-level unnumbered island platform connected to the station entrance by a footbridge. It has no station building, though there is a shelter on the platform. The station is unattended.

=== Platforms ===
Entry side	■ Yamaguchi Line	for Shin-Yamaguchi
Opposite side	■ Yamaguchi Line	for Yamaguchi and Tsuwano

== History ==
Niho Station opened on 1 July 1917. It came to JR West when the Japan National Railway (JNR) was privatized on 1 April 1987.

== Passenger statistics ==
Niho Station was used by a daily average of 36 passengers in fiscal 2020.

== Surrounding area ==
- Yamaguchi City Niho Regional Exchange Center
- Yamaguchi Municipal Niho Junior High School
- Yamaguchi Municipal Niho Elementary School

== See also ==
- List of railway stations in Japan
