= Kamienyajizōyama Kofun =

- 上塩冶地蔵山古墳 (Japanese)
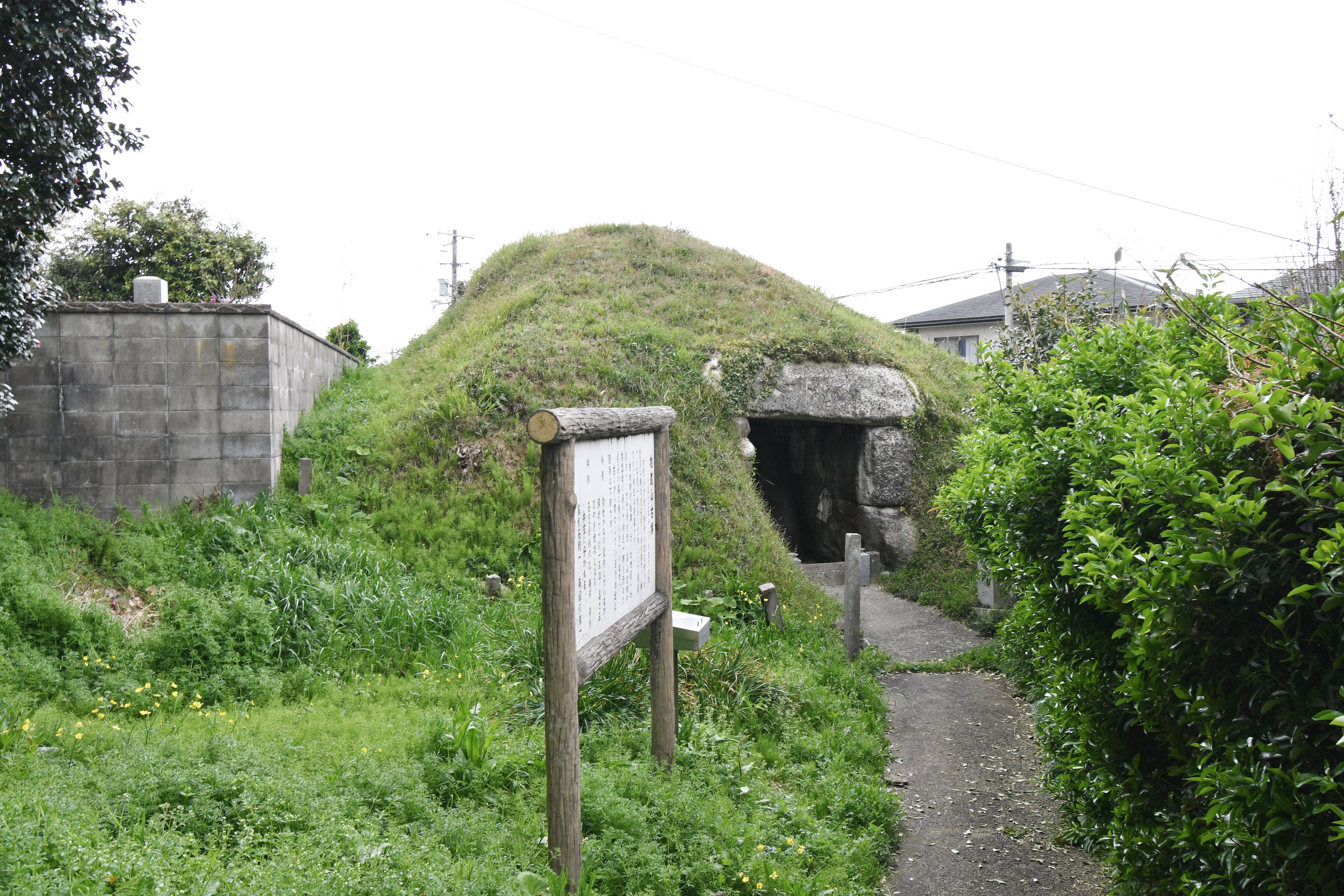
- Kamienyajizōyama Kofun

- Kamienyajizōyama Kofun Kamienyajizōyama Kofun (Japan)
- Interactive map of Kamienyajizōyama Kofun
- 35°20′45.95″N 132°45′34.15″E
- Type: Kofun
- Periods: Kofun period
- Location: Izumo, Shimane, Japan
- Region: San'in region

History
- Built: c.7th century

Site notes
- Public access: Yes (no facilities)

The Kamienyajizōyama Kofun (上塩冶地蔵山古墳) is a Kofun period burial mound, located in the Kamienya-chō, neighborhood of the city of Izumo, Shimane in the San'in region of Japan. The tumulus was designated a National Historic Site of Japan in 1924. It is ne of the burial mounds that make up the Tsukiyama Kofun Cluster.

== Overview ==
The Kamienyajizōyama Kofun is located on the north bank of the Kobe River, on a gentle slope on the west side of the Izumo Technical High School. in the northeastern part of Shimane Prefecture. Although the area around the tumulus has been largely leveled land clearing for paddy fields, the tumulus is believed to be a square hōfun (方墳)-style kofun, measuring 15 meters on each side, and with a height of five meters, although it may originally have been an oval-shaped tumulus. The horizontal stone burial chamber opens to the southeast, and consists of a burial chamber (back chamber), an antechamber, and a passageway. It was constructed with the same processed tuff stones as the Kamienyatsukiyama Kofun located 600 meters to the north. The burial chamber is about 9 meters long, 2.4 meters wide, and 2.25 meters high. The walls and ceiling of the burial chamber are each made of a single monolith of cut stone, and on the boundary with the antechamber in the foreground there is an entrance carved out of a single piece of stone. A house-shaped sarcophagus is placed in the back. As the tomb has been open since antiquity, no grave goods have been found, although no modern archaeological excavation has been conducted. From the structure of the tumulus, it is believed to have been built around the 7th century, or the final stages of the Kofun period.

The tumulus is 1.7 kilometers, or approximately five minutes by car from JR West San'in Main Line Izumoshi Station.

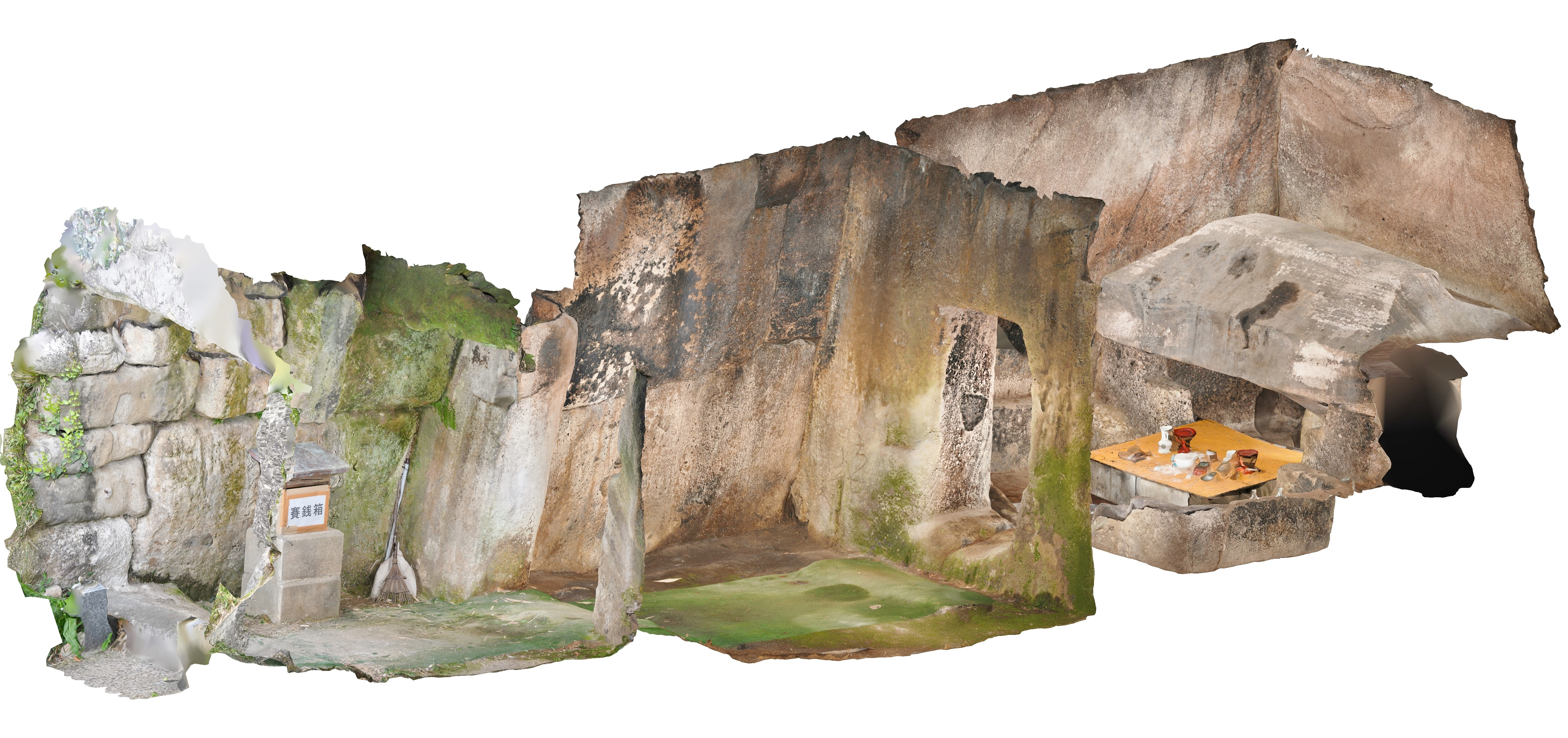
3D rendition of the burial chamber

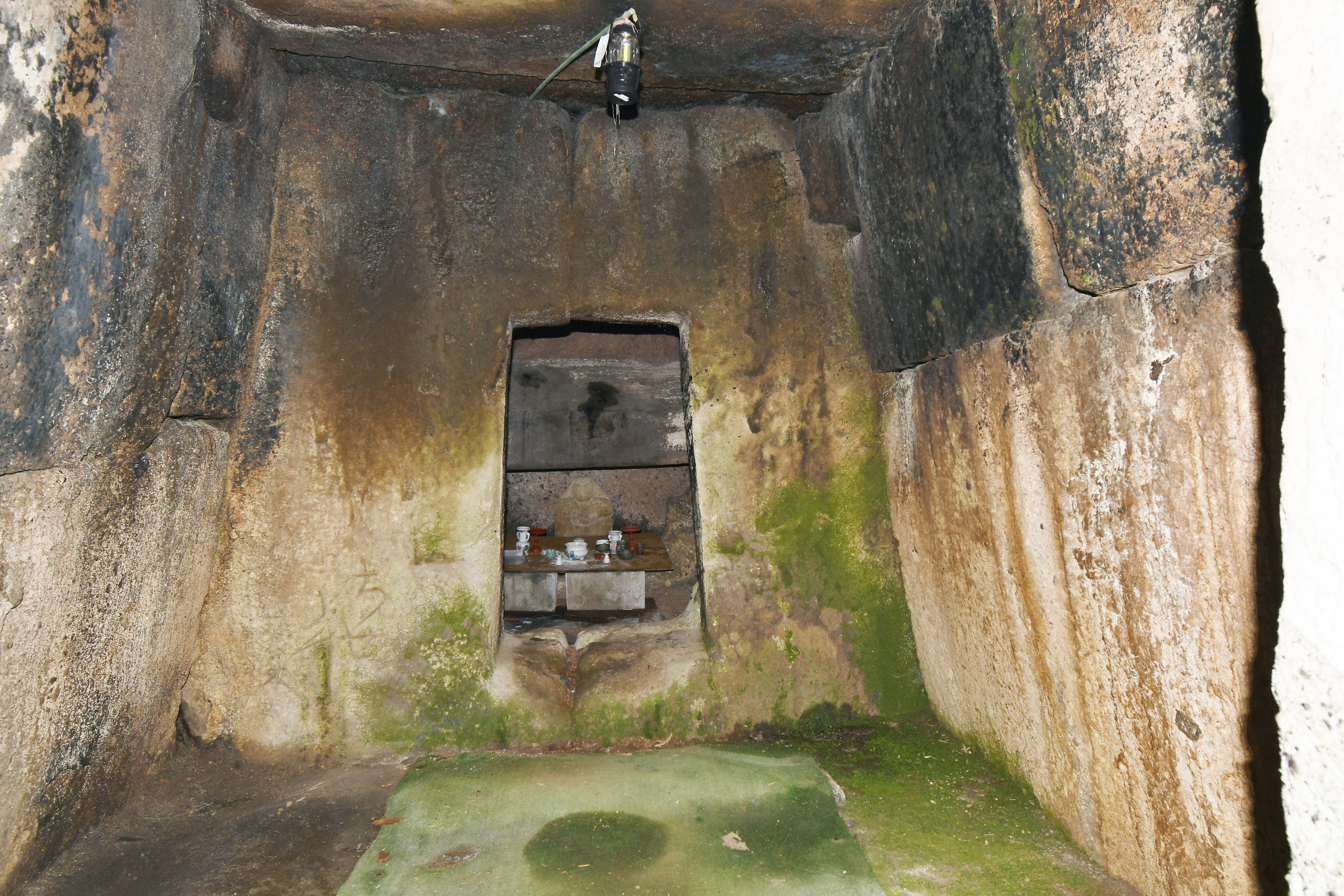
Antechamber（looking towards burial chamber）

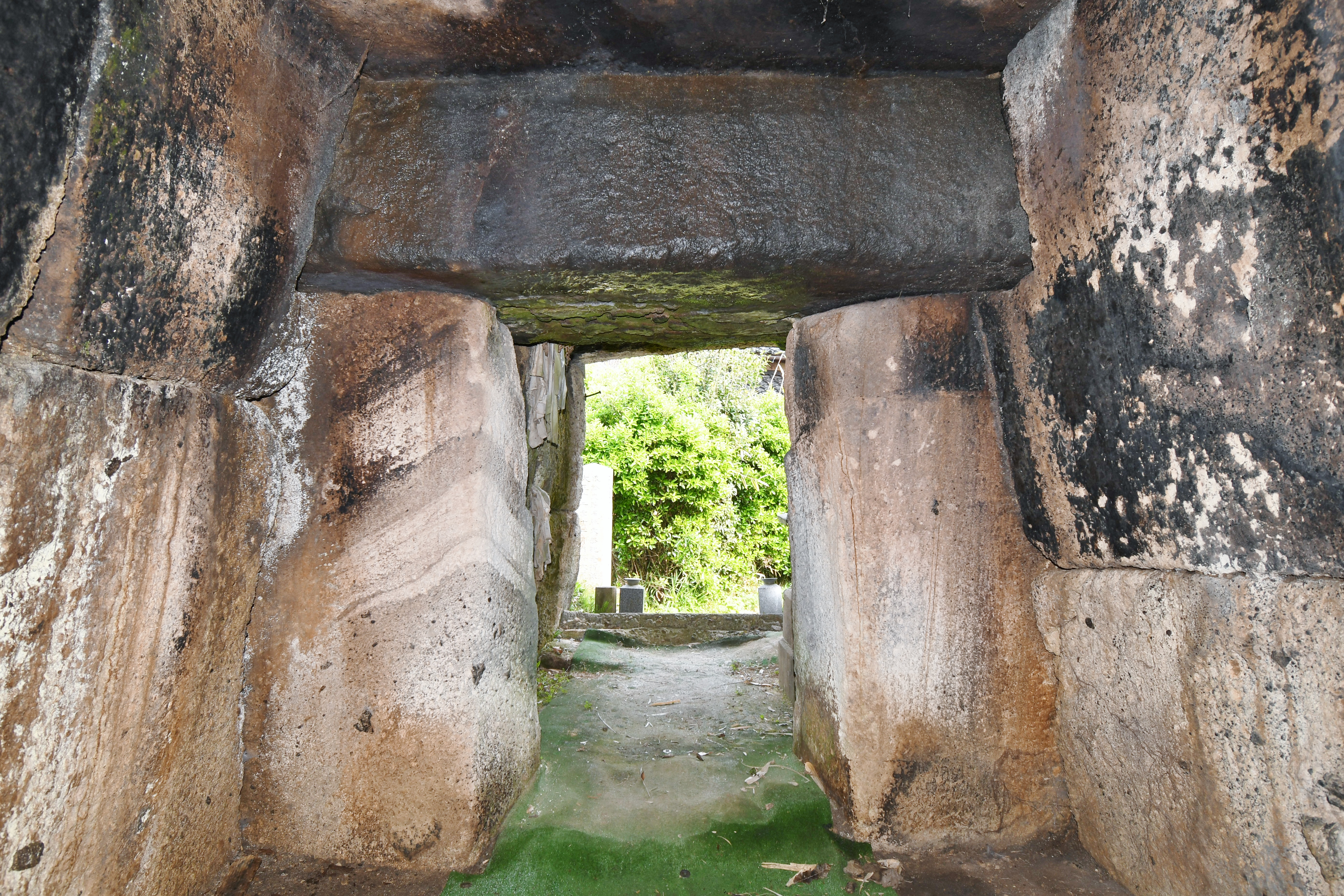
Antechamber（looking toward entrance）

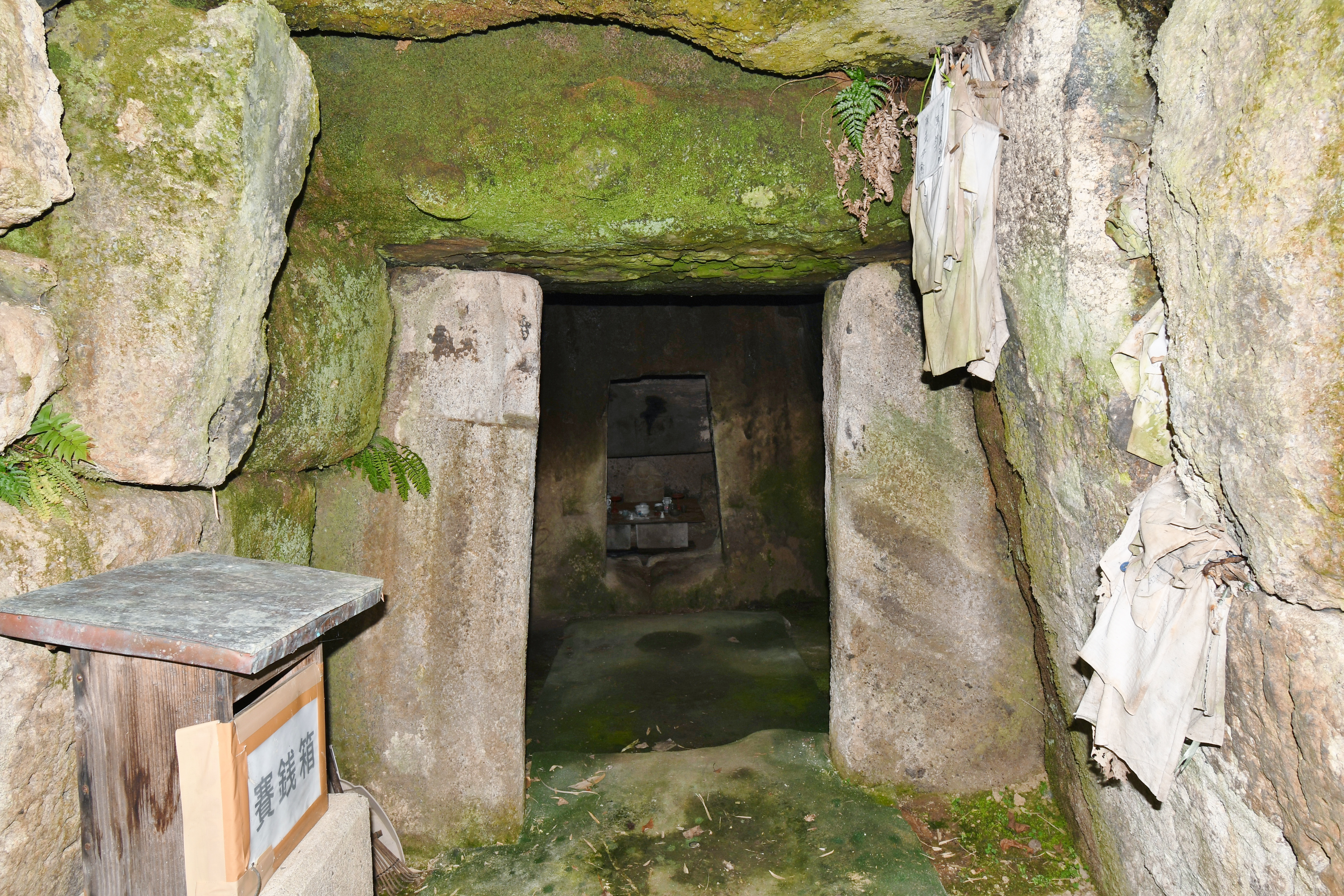
Corridor（looking towards burial chamber）

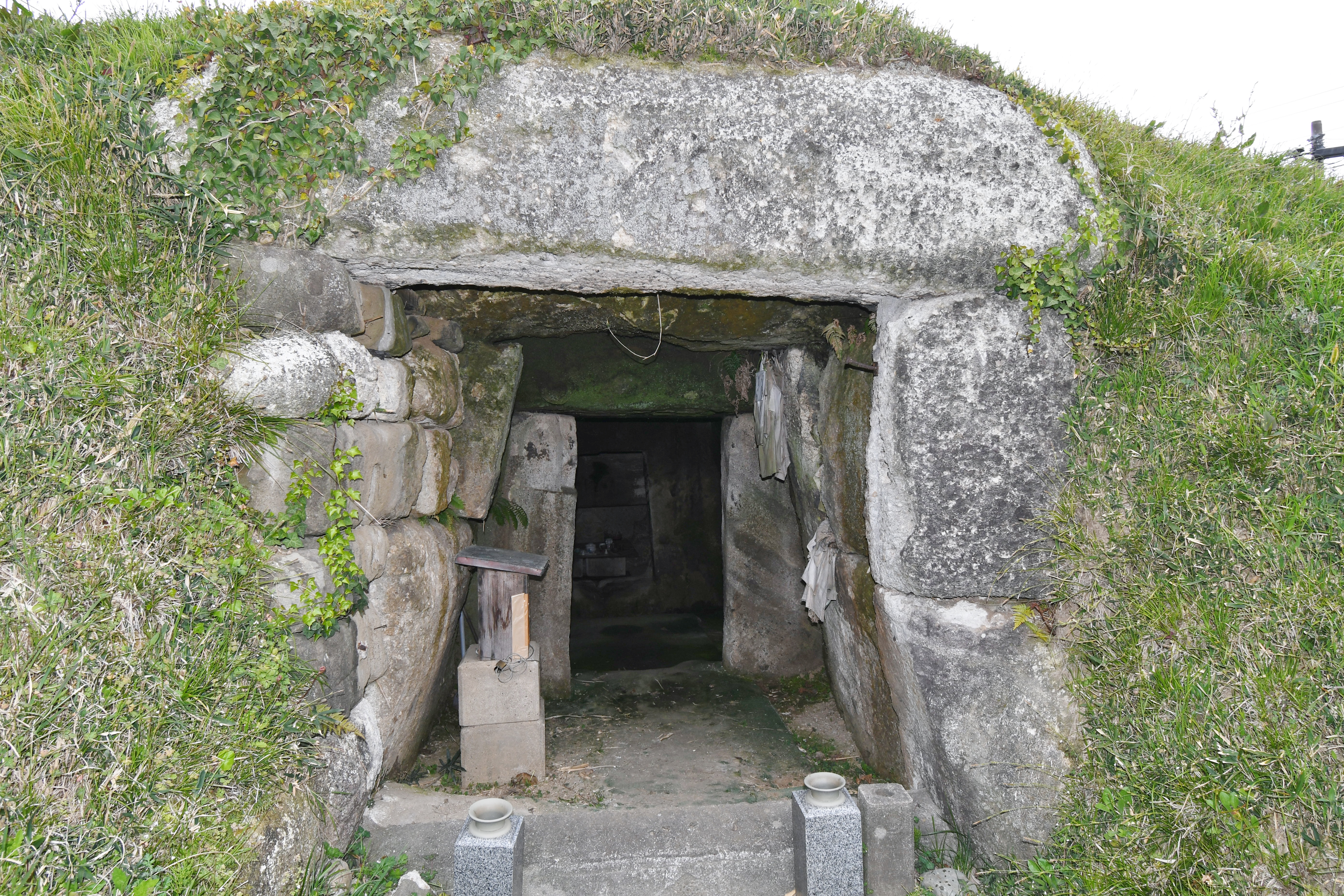
Entrance

== See also ==
- List of Historic Sites of Japan (Shimane)
