= Okadayama Kofun =

Kofun period burial mound in Matsue, Shimane Prefecture, Japan

- 岡田山古墳 (Japanese)
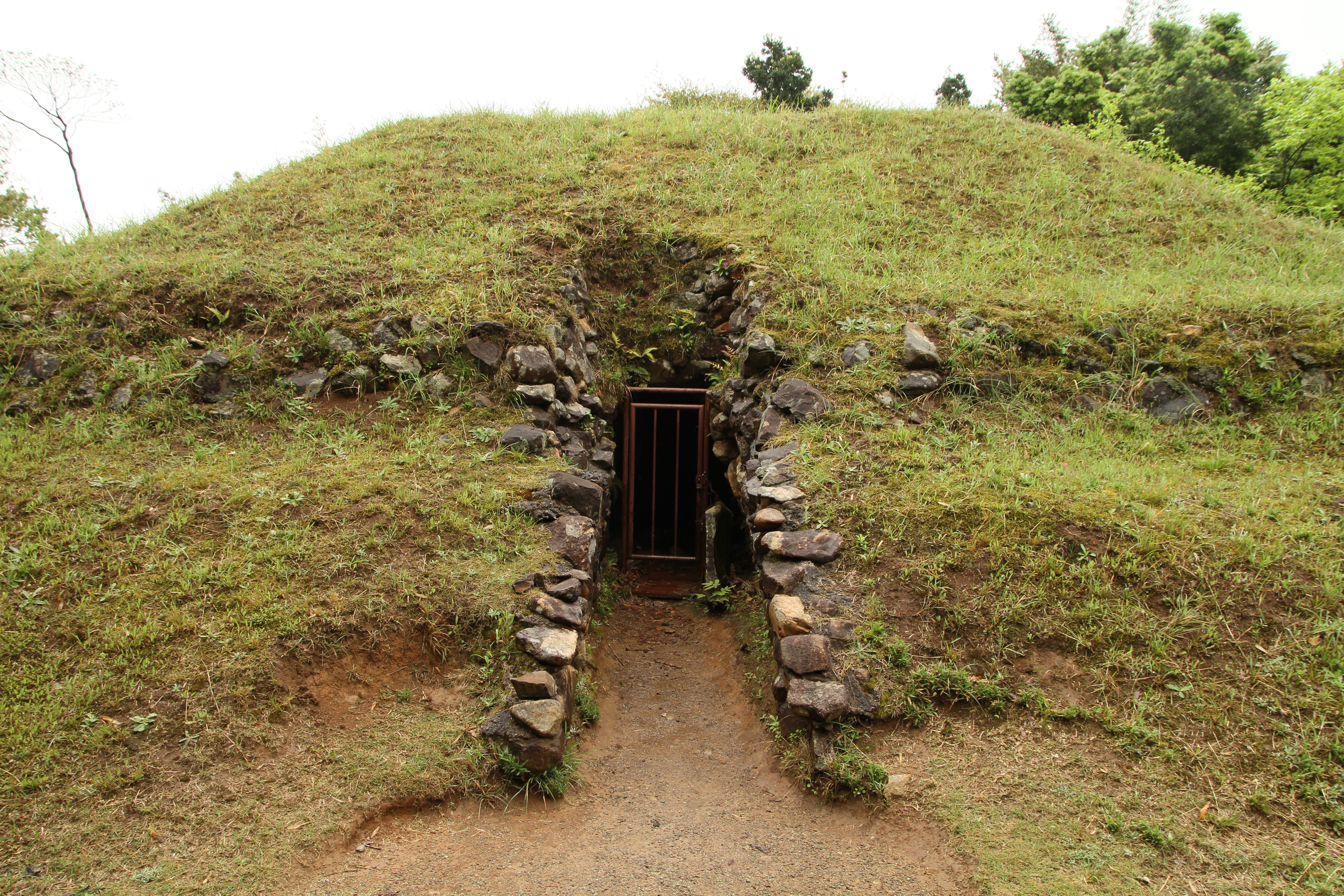
- Okadayama Kofun

- Okadayama Kofun Okadayama Kofun (Japan)
- Interactive map of Okadayama Kofun
- 35°25′39″N 133°05′29″E
- Type: Kofun
- Periods: Kofun period
- Location: Matsue, Shimane, Japan
- Region: San'in region

History
- Built: c.6th century

Site notes
- Public access: Yes (no facilities)

The Okadayama Kofun (岡田山古墳) is a cluster of seven large and small Kofun period burial mounds, located in the Okusa-cho neighborhood of the city of Matsue, Shimane in the San'in region of Japan. The two larger burial mounds were collectively designated a National Historic Site of Japan in 1965. The artifacts from this site have been collectively designated a National Important Cultural Property in 1985.

== Overview ==
In the Okadayama Kofun cluster, Kofun No. 1 and Kofun No. 2 are relatively large, but the other five are extremely small. Kofun No. 1 is a "two conjoined rectangles" type (zenpō-kōhō-fun (前方後方墳)) tumulus, with a total length of 24 meters, with the posterior portion about 14 meters wide and about 4 meters high, and the anterior portion about 14 meters wide and 3.5 meters high. The burial chamber is a horizontal stone chamber with a total length of 5.6 meters, containing a house-shaped sarcophagus made of tuff. It is believed to have been built in the middle of the 6th century. The tumulus was excavated in 1915. Grave goods included decorative iron swords, ironware, silver rings, gilt bronze round beads, horse harnesses, bronze mirrors, and Sue ware pottery. The inscription 'Nukatabe no Omi' was discovered using X-ray photography on the blade of one of the swords in 1983. One of the bronze mirrors also was found to have an inscription, which dated it to the Later Han dynasty. The burial chamber shows a strong connection to Kyushu, where a similar corbel construction technique has been used.

Kofun No. 2 is a circular (empun (円墳)) style tumulus located 30 meters south of Kofun No. 1. It has a diameter of approximately 43 meters and a height of approximately 6.5 meters and is the third largest in Shimane Prefecture. No excavations have been conducted.

At present, the site is preserved as the Yakumotatsu Fudoki-no-oka archaeological park, which is approximately 5.5 kilometers, or 13 minutes by car, from Matsue Station on the JR West San'in Main Line.

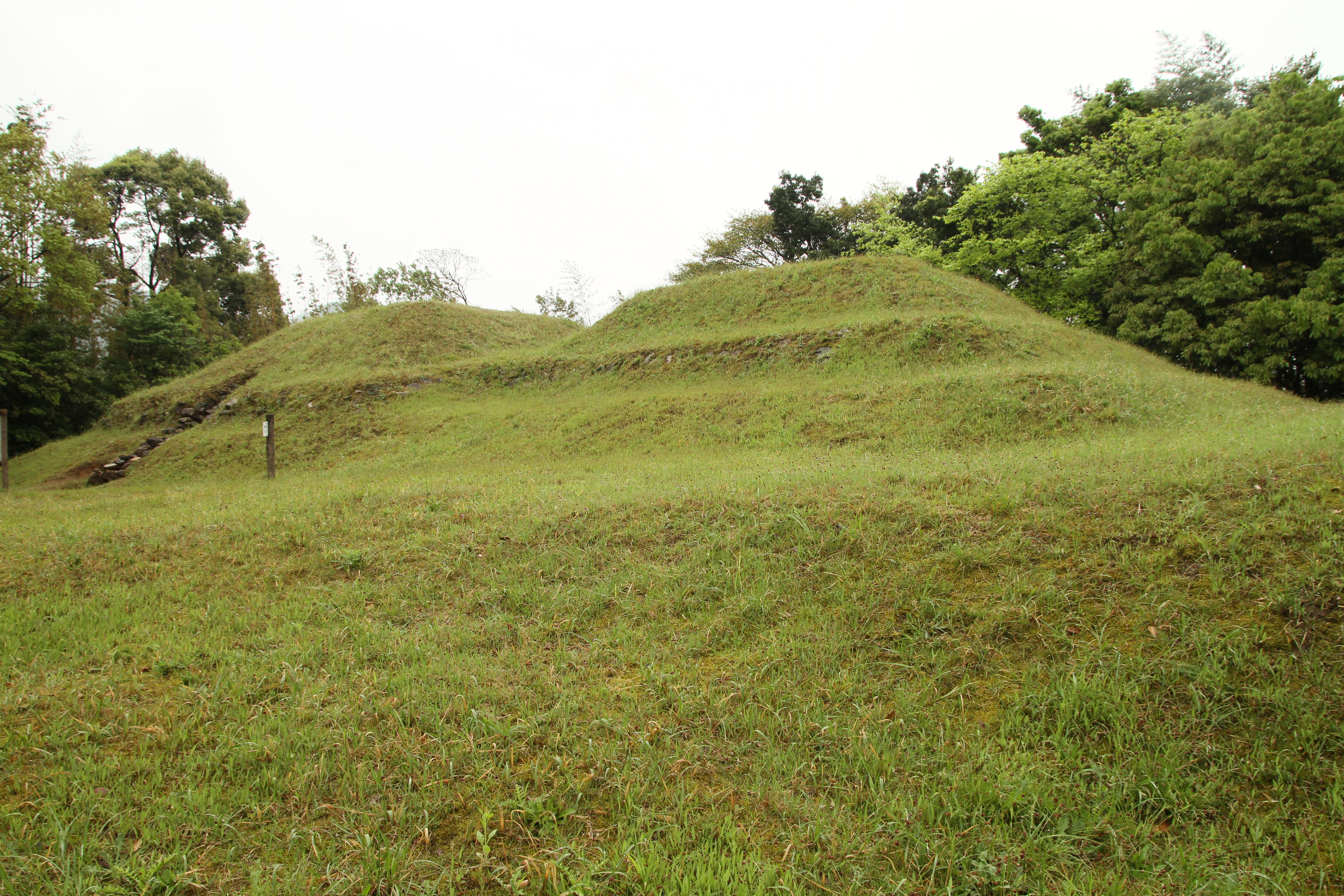
Kofun No.1

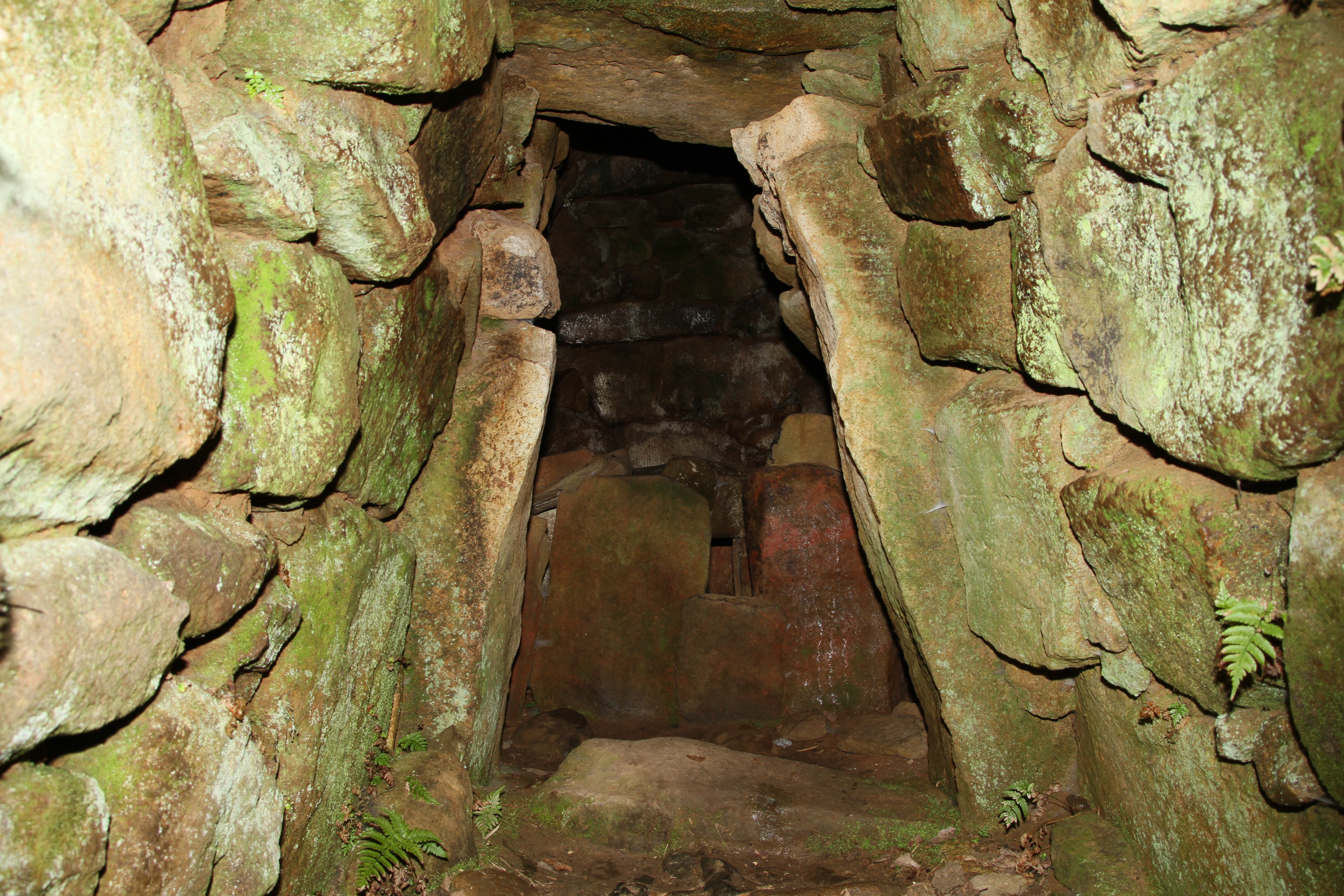
Kofun No.1Burial Chamber

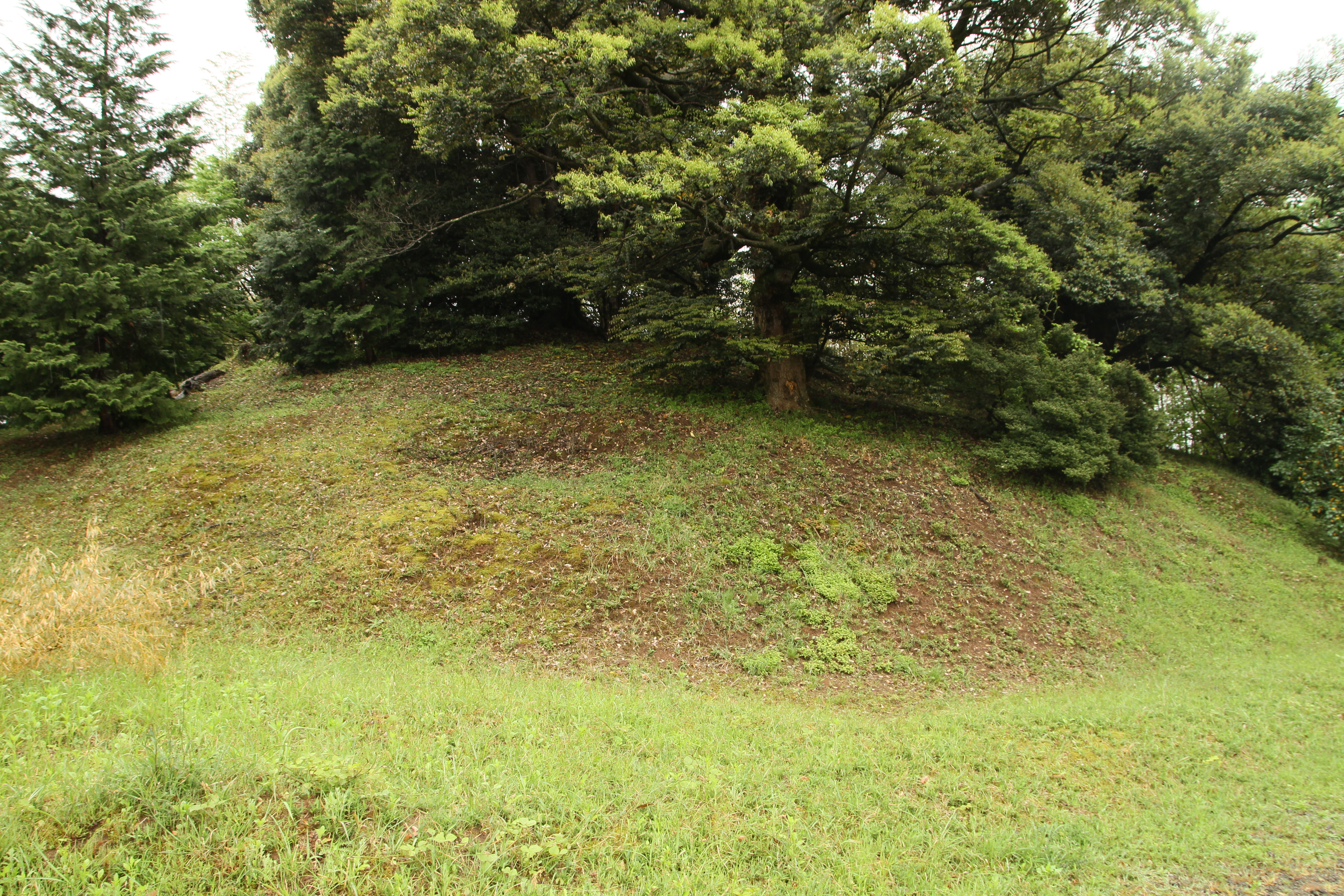
Kofun No.2

== See also ==
- List of Historic Sites of Japan (Shimane)
