= Kunidominakamura Kofun =

Japanese archaeological site

- 国富中村古墳 (Japanese)
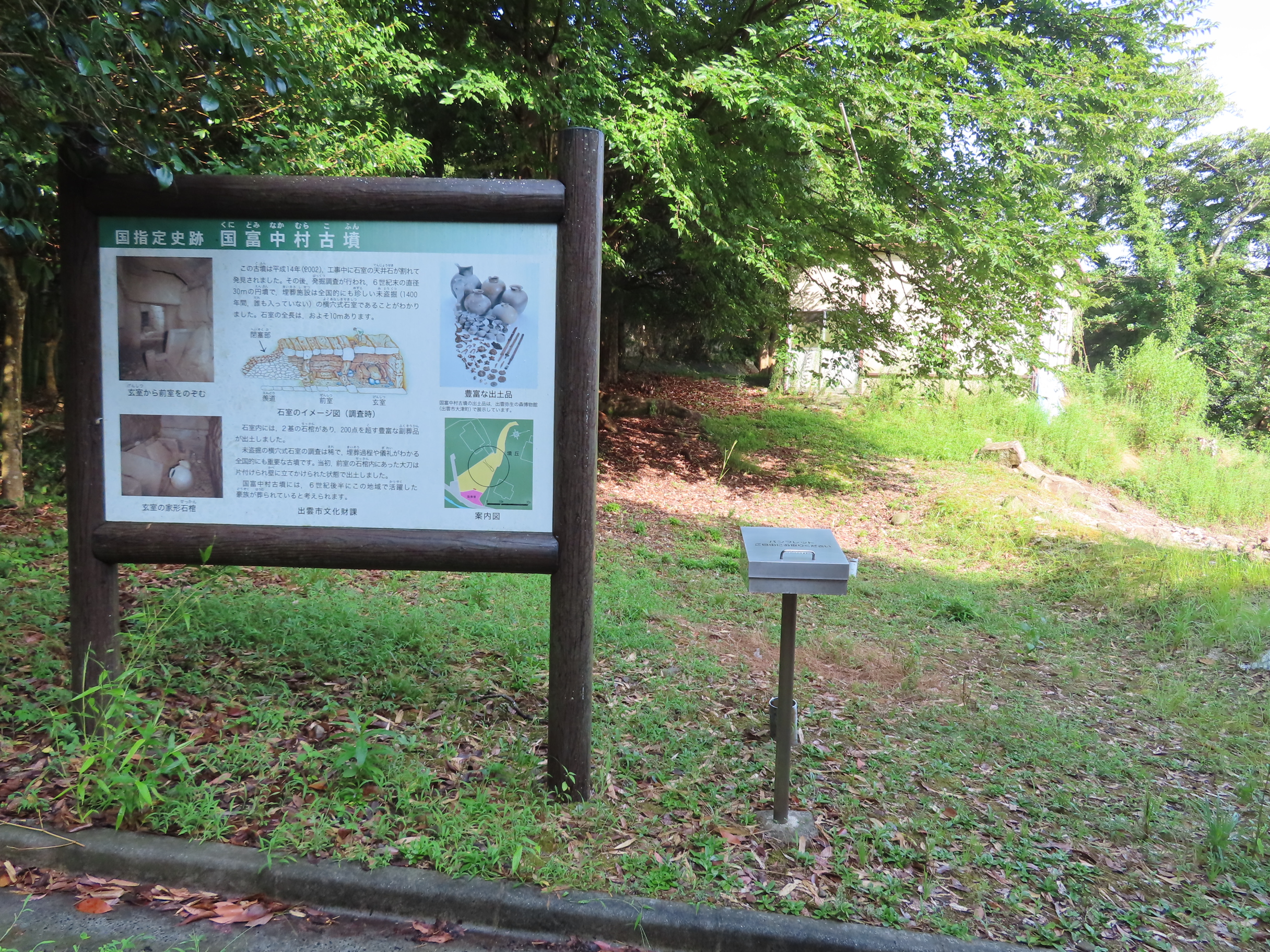
- Kunidominakamura Kofun

- Kunidominakamura Kofun Kunidominakamura Kofun (Japan)
- Interactive map of Kunidominakamura Kofun
- 35°25′39″N 132°48′03″E
- Type: Kofun
- Periods: Kofun period
- Location: Izumo, Shimane, Japan
- Region: San'in region

History
- Built: c.6th to 7th century

Site notes
- Public access: Yes (no facilities)

The Kunidominakamura Kofun (国富中村古墳) is a Kofun period burial mound, located in the Kunidomari neighborhood of the city of Izumo, Shimane in the San'in region of Japan. The tumulus was designated a National Historic Site of Japan in 2013.

== Overview ==
Mount Kitayama is a massif that stretches from east to west on the north side of the Izumo Plain. At the western end of this massif is Hinomisaki Shrine, and at the eastern end is Mt. Tabushi, which is 462 meters above sea level. The Kunidominakamura Kofun is located in eastern Shimane Prefecture at the southern foot of Mount Tabushi. The tumulus was leveled in road construction in 2002 and its existence only became known when construction workers found the tunnel-stye stone burial chamber. The size of the burial chamber and evidence that it had never been robbed drew immediate archaeological attention. Excavations have determined that the kofun was originally an enpun (円墳)-style round tumulus with a diameter of approximately 30 meters. The chamber itself was over 9.3 meters in length and consisted of a burial chamber itself and an antechamber. The burial chamber is 3.3 meters long, 1.9 meters wide and 2 meters high, the antechamber is 2.5 meters long, 1.2 to 1.5 meters wide and 1.8 meters high, and the corridor is 1.8 meters long. The entry to the stone chamber is blocked with natural stones, and the blocking stone completely preserved the conditions at the time of burial.

Inside the burial chamber was house-shaped sarcophagus. The cover stone is broken into three large pieces, and it is believed that the damage was done intentionally because the marks of hammer blows can be seen on the cover stone. In addition, there is a box-shaped sarcophagus without a lid in the antechamber, and it is thought that burial was performed twice, first in a house-shaped sarcophagus, then in the box-shaped sarcophagus. The chamber has not been completely excavated for preservation purposes, but grave goods included one bronze mirror, one gold ring, one silver ring, three glass beads, four bronze bells, three decorative iron swords, and three iron knives. In addition, three sets of iron arrowheads, three sets of horse harnesses and 61 pieces of Sue ware were found. From these artifacts, it is believed that the tumulus was built between the end of the 6th century and the beginning of the 7th century. As a result of stratigraphic excavation of the burial chamber, it was determined that two iron swords were initially arranged by leaning them against the wall of the burial chamber, while other have been ritually broken. The intentional damage to the sarcophagus also points to some ritual destruction.

The Kunidominakamura Kofun is 1.1 kilometers, or approximately 12 minutes on foot from Tabushi Station on the Kita-Matsue Line of the Ichibata Electric Railway.

== See also ==
- List of Historic Sites of Japan (Shimane)
