= Kuki Silver Mine =

Historic mine in Japan

Coordinates: 34°49′26″N 132°34′11″E

- Kuki Silver Mine Kuki Silver Mine (Japan)
- Location: Shimane Prefecture, Japan
- Products: silver, Lead
- Closed: 1907
- National Historic Site of Japan

The Kuki Silver Mine (久喜銀山遺, Kuki ginzan) was once a lead and silver mine in pre-modern Iwami Province, Japan. The area is now part of the town of Ōnan, Shimane. Long overshadowed by the much more famous Iwami Ginzan Silver Mine, the Kuki Silver Mine was designated as a National Historic Site in 2021.

== Overview ==
The Kuki Silver Mine is located the Chugoku Mountains near the border with Hiroshima Prefecture. It is believed that the discovery of silver veins in this area dates back to the Kamakura period, but full-scale mining began in the 16th century during the Sengoku period, when Mōri Motonari took control of the area. The site is located approximately 35 kilometers south of more famous Iwami Ginzan Silver Mine. The designated area of the National Historic Site is three kilometers east-to-west and two kilometers north-to-south, within which 1136 traces of mining activity and related industrial operations have been identified. The ore found in this area is silver-containing lead (galena) ore, which is found in mostly surface outcrops. The Kuki site also include facilities for crushing and heating the ore, a smelting furnace and slag piles. The area became tenryō under the direct control of the Tokugawa shogunate in the Edo Period, but its silver production gradually declined and operations stopped at the beginning of the 18th century as extraction became more difficult due to flooding.

After the start of the Meiji period, operations were briefly resumed with western technology, and in 1900 a large vein was discovered. In 1902, over 2000 miners resided in the area. According to 1903 records, the site two drying kilns, 20 roasting kilns and two smelting kilns, along with a water mill, power plant, ore crushing plant and ore processing plant. The procedure was to bake 3-4 tons of raw ore in the drying kiln for one day, transfer it to a roasting kiln where some 11 tons would be calcinated to remove sulphur and then to process in a smelting kiln, where silver-containing lead (99% lead, 0.9% silver) ingots were produced. The production volume was about 210.5 tons (1.9 tons of silver) in 1903 and about 255.4 tons (2.2 tons of silver) in 1904. The ingots were transported via Hamada Port to Osaka. However, in 1907, the entrance of the tunnel was submerged, and the amount of silver produced decreased sharply. In 1951, Chugoku Mining Co., Ltd. attempted to redevelop the mine, but due to the drop in silver prices, the project was abandoned. Currently, there are many tunnels (pits) in this area, large-scale smelter ruins, brick-stacked flues on the mountainside.

== See also ==
- List of Historic Sites of Japan (Shimane)
