= Izumo Tamatsukuri site =

Archaeological site in Matsue, Japan

Izumo Tamazukuri site
- 出雲玉作跡 (Japanese)
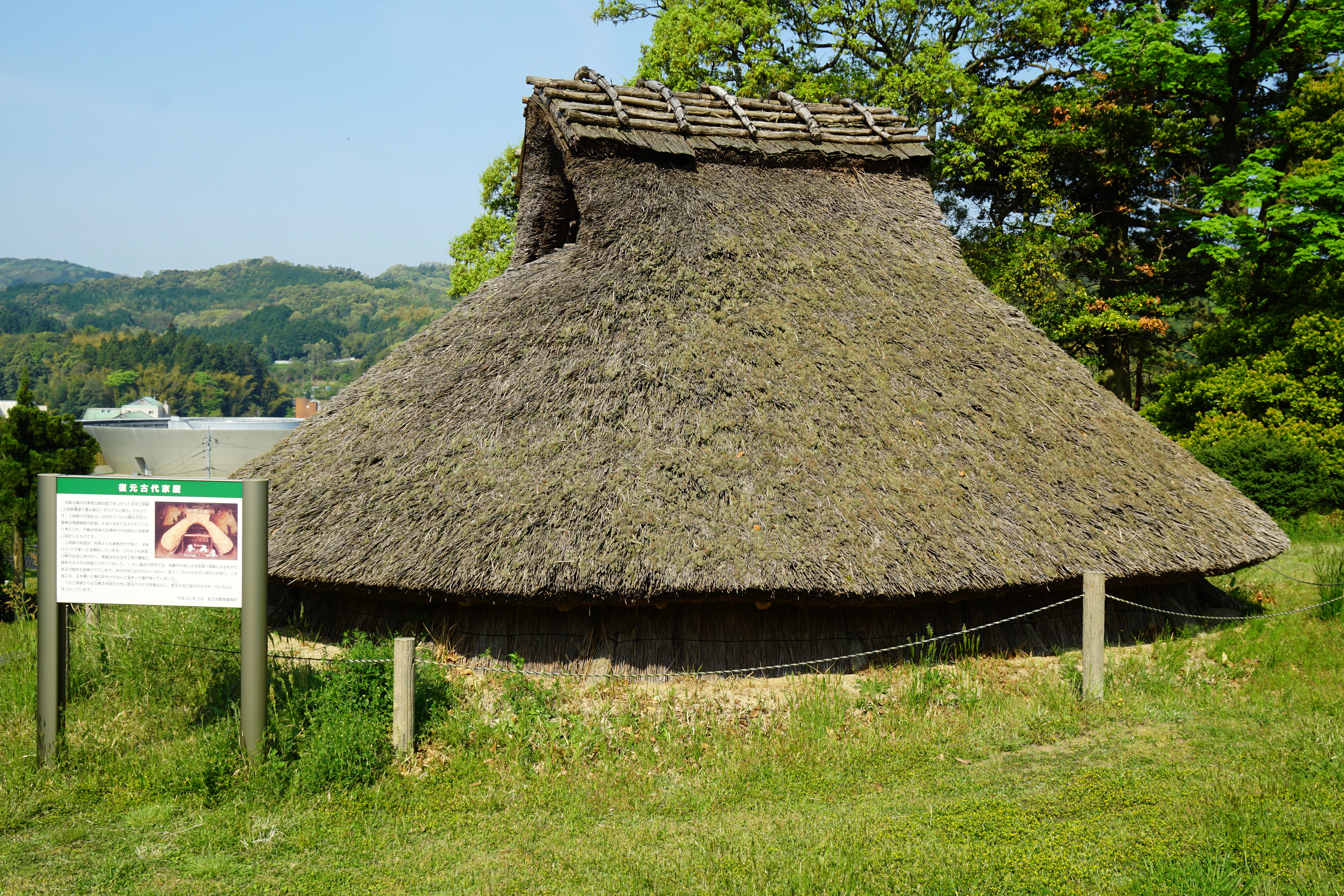
- Restored pit dwelling at Izumo Tamazukuri site

- Izumo Tamazukuri site Izumo Tamatsukuri site (Japan)
- Interactive map of Izumo Tamazukuri site
- 35°24′58.8″N 133°00′44.59″E
- Type: industrial site
- Periods: Kofun period
- Location: Matsue, Shimane, Japan
- Region: San'in region

Site notes
- Public access: Yes (park, museum)

The Izumo Tamazukuri site (出雲玉作跡, Izumo tamazukuri iseki) is an archaeological site in the Tamayu-chō neighborhood of the city of Matsue, Shimane Prefecture, in the San'in region of western Japan. It contains the traces of a number of workshops from the Kofun period where magatama and other beads were produced, It was designated a National Historic Site in 1922, with the area under protection expanded in 2004. The excavated items from this site were collectively designated a National Important Cultural Property in 1977.

== Overview ==
As its name suggests, the Tamatsukuri Onsen area was a major producer of beads from the Kofun period through the Heian periods. It is mentioned in ancient texts such as the Kogo Shūi and Engishiki that beads were made in this area since prehistoric times. One such area is the Miyagaki district, which is located about one kilometer northeast of the Tamatsukuri Onsen town center, at the southwest foot of Mt. Kasen. This hill, with an elevation of about 200 meters, is a source of high-quality agate, especially a blue agate called "hekigyoku", as well as red and white agate. This area, along with the Miyanokami and Tamanomiya districts, which are located further into the hot spring town, was collectively designated as a National Historic Sites in 1922. Archaeological excavations were conducted in 1969 and 1971, and the remains of approximately 30 bead-making workshops were unearthed. From the large amount of artifacts excavated, it has been confirmed that beads were produced from the early Kofun period to the Heian period. The excavated items include a huge number of finished and unfinished beads made of jasper, agate, and quartz crystal. Both magatama and cylindrical beads were made. There are tens of thousands of other artifacts, including polishing whetstones and other tools.

Currently, the site is being maintained as the Izumo Tamasaku Historical Site Park, which includes a kofun burial mound, restored workshop, and reconstructions of pit dwellings. The excavated items are preserved and exhibited at the Izumo Tamasaku Museum within the park. The site is ten minutes by car from JR West San'in Main Line Tamatsukuri-Onsen Station.

== See also ==
- List of Historic Sites of Japan (Shimane)
