= Gongenyama Caves =

Archaeological site in Matsue, Japan

- 権現山洞窟住居跡 (Japanese)
- Gongenyama caves Gongenyama Caves (Japan)
- 35°32′37″N 133°12′35″E
- Periods: Jōmon period
- Location: Matsue, Shimane, Japan
- Region: San'in region

Site notes
- Public access: No
- National Historic Site of Japan

The Gongenyama Caves (権現山洞窟住居跡, Gongenyama dōkutsu jūkyo ato) is an archaeological site consisting of a cave dwelling in the Mihonoseki-cho neighborhood of the city of Matsue, Shimane Prefecture in the San'in region of Japan. The site was designated a National Historic Site of Japan in 1942.

== Overview ==
The Gongenyama Cave is a large sea erosion cave located on the cliffs facing the Sakai Channel and the Nakaumi on the southern coast of the Shimane Peninsula. It has an opening of eight to nine meters in width, and extends three to four meters into a rhyolite cliff. From well-preserved stratigraphic layers in this cave, early to late fragments of late Jōmon pottery, stone arrowheads, spears, shellfish, and animal bones and human remains were excavated in 1936, indicating continuous occupation for several thousands of years. There are two types of Jōmon pottery: refined (polished) and crude pottery, and pseudo-Jōmon pottery (designed using conch shells). The site is located along Japan National Route 431 about 150 meters east of the Mihonoseki Moriyama Post Office, and about 30 meters down a narrow side street. Due to the danger of falling rocks, entry to the cave is prohibited.

== See also ==
- List of Historic Sites of Japan (Shimane)
