= Takarazuka Kofun (Izumo) =

- 宝塚古墳 (Japanese)
- Takarazuka Kofun Takarazuka Kofun (Izumo) (Japan)
- Interactive map of Takarazuka Kofun
- 35°20′21″N 132°44′00″E
- Type: Kofun
- Periods: Kofun period
- Location: Izumo, Shimane, Japan
- Region: San'in region

History
- Built: c.6th century

Site notes
- Public access: Yes (no facilities)

The Takarazuka Kofun (宝塚古墳) is a Kofun period burial mound, located in the Shimogoshi-cho neighborhood of the city of Izumo, Shimane in the San'in region of Japan. The tumulus was designated a National Historic Site of Japan in 1931. It is believed to have been built in the middle of the 6th century, or towards the end of the Kofun period. It is also called the Ippo-zuka (一保塚).

== Overview ==
The Takarazuka Kofun is located on the natural embankment of the Kando River, surrounded by paddy fields and 100 meters east of Izumonishi High School. Much of the tumulus has been lost, to the extent that the ceiling stone of the burial chamber is exposed, so the original shape and size of the tumulus is uncertain. Fragments of cylindrical haniwa have been found in the vicinity. The burial chamber has an opening to the south, and is 3.6 meters deep, 2.1 meters wide, and 2.5 meters high. Cut tuff stone is used for the wall stones, the back wall is a single stone, the east wall of the side wall is two-tiered with large stones in the lower part, and the west wall is two-tiered with large stones in the back, while the front side is a stone wall. It contains a house-shaped sarcophagus. The burial chamber has been open since antiquity, so only a few iron arrowheads have been recovered as grave goods. It is estimated to have been built in the latter half of the 6th century, judging from the structure of the stone chamber.

The tumulus is about four kilometers (ten minutes by car) from Izumoshi Station on the JR West San'in Main Line.

== See also ==
- List of Historic Sites of Japan (Shimane)
