= Tawayama ruins =

- 田和山遺跡 (Japanese)
- Tawayama ruins Tawayama ruins (Japan)
- 35°26′18″N 133°03′14″E
- Type: Settlement ruins
- Periods: Yayoi period
- Location: Matsue, Shimane, Japan
- Region: San'in region

History
- Built: 2nd century AD

Site notes
- Elevation: 10 m (33 ft)
- Public access: Yes (archaeological park)
- National Historic Site of Japan

The Tawayama ruins (田和山遺跡, Tawayama iseki) is an archaeological site with the traces of a Yayoi period settlement located on the Noshira-chō neighborhood of the city of Matsue, Shimane Prefecture in the San'in region of Japan. The site was designated a National Historic Site in 2001.

== Overview ==
From 1997 to 2000, as a result of excavation surveys accompanying the construction of the Matsue Municipal Hospital, a triple ring moat system dating from the end of the early to late middle Yayoi period was discovered on the ridge of a hill called Mount Tawa, overlooking Lake Shinji to the northwest. The maximum scale of the largest moat is seven meters wide and 1.8 meter deep. In Yayoi period moated settlements the remains of dwellings are usually placed inside the surrounding moats, which were thought to have military, defensive, and stronghold characteristics. The Wajinden of the Wei Zhi (ca. 297), which is part of the Records of the Three Kingdoms in Chinese Dynastic Histories mentions the Civil War of Wa, which occurred during the late Yayoi period (2nd century AD), which corresponds to roughly the time that defensive features appeared in many Yayoi period settlements, particularly from the eastern Seto Inland Sea to the Kinki region. However, in the case of the Tawayama ruins, the traces of the 11 pit dwellings that were discovered were all found outside the ring moat system. At the summit of the hill, which is about 45 meters above sea level, was the foundation for a building with nine pillars and with five pillars. The perimeter of the flat ground at the top of the hill is lined with post holes that look like traces of fences. This created a problem for conventional archaeological wisdom, as it was a mystery as to why such a huge amount of labor was invested in excavating a defensive ring moat system, when the population lived outside, and the only structures within the moats was what appeared to be buildings with a ceremonial or religious significance. However, the presence of more than 3000 stone arrowheads, stone blades and stone tools from inside the moat, suggest the possibility that the structure inside the moats was some sort of castle. In addition, inkstones have been excavated from the site, which is extremely rare among ruins of the Yayoi period, as it is still believed that writing had not been introduced into Japan at this time.

Currently, the site has been maintained as an archaeological park adjacent to the city hospital, and is being maintained by a local volunteer group. It is located next to Japan National Route 9, approximately 1.6 kilometers from Nogi Station on the JR West San'in Main Line.

== See also ==
- List of Historic Sites of Japan (Shimane)
