= Chūsenji Kofun Cluster =

Group of burial mounds in Shimane, Japan

- 仲仙寺古墳群 (Japanese)
- Chūsenji Kofun Cluster Chūsenji Kofun Cluster (Japan)
- 35°25′14.5″N 133°12′50.5″E
- Type: Kofun custer
- Periods: Yayoi - Kofun period
- Location: Yasugi, Shimane, Japan
- Region: San'in region

History
- Built: c.2nd to 5th century

Site notes
- Public access: Yes (no facilities)
- National Historic Site of Japan

Chūsenji Kofun Cluster (仲仙寺古墳群) is a group of late Yayoi period to Kofun period burial mounds, located in the Nishiakae neighborhood of the city of Yasugi, Shimane, Japan. The tumuli were collectively designated a National Historic Site of Japan in 1971, with the area under protection expanded in 1974.

== Overview ==
The Chūsenji Kofun cluster is located on the low hills of the Iinashi River basin, which flows west of Yasugi City. It is divided into the Chūsenji Sub-Group, which is located on the ridge of the Chūsenji Hills, and the Miyayama Sub-Group, which is located on the hills to the east of the Chūsenji Hills. The Chūsenji Sub-Group one consisted of 18 tumuli, including three yosumi tosshutsu-gata funkyū (四隅突出型墳丘墓) square-cornered tumuli, eight hōfun (方墳)-style square tumuli, and seven enpun (円墳)-style circular tumuli, but they have disappeared due to residential development, leaving only two survivors: Kofun No. 8 and Kofun No. 9. Archaeological excavations have revealed that Kofun No. 9 is about 3 meters high, a square-cornered tumuli with flat split stones attached to the base, and three burial facilities containing wooden coffins at the top. It is thought to have been built around the 3rd to 4th century, or during the late Yayoi period. Kofun No. 8 has not been investigated, but since flat split stones can be seen at the base, it is thought to also be a square-cornered tumuli. The four-cornered tumulus was a style adopted mainly in the Chugoku mountainous region, San'in region, and Hokuriku region from the late middle Yayoi period to the end of the Yayoi period. It is a square tumulus with four corners protruding like a starfish. Kofun No.10 (also a square-cornered tumuli) had a total of ten burial pits, at least eight of eight are overlapping, indicating that the mound was reused for remains from different periods. This tumulus has been lost due to urban encroachment.

The Miyayama Subgroup consisted of one pit dwelling site, one square-cornered tumulus, two zenpō-kōen-fun (前方後円墳), which are shaped like a keyhole, having one square end and one circular end, when viewed from above, one circular tumulus, and two square tumuli, but one of the keyhole-shaped tumuli has now disappeared. The square-cornered tumulus is 2.5 meters high and similar in size to Chūsenji Subgroup Tomb No. 9, but it only has one burial facility and is estimated to date to the Early Kofun period. It was added to the National Historic Site in 1974

The site is about 1.6 kilometers south of Arashima Station on the JR West San'in Main Line.

== See also ==
- List of Historic Sites of Japan (Shimane)
