= List of historic sites of Japan (Shimane) =

This list is of the historic sites of Japan located within the Prefecture of Shimane.

== National Historic Sites ==
As of 1 July 2021, sixty Sites have been designated as being of national significance; the San'indō and Tsuwano Domain Kamei clan cemetery with the Grave of Kamei Korenori span the prefectural borders with Tottori.

Site	Municipality	Comments	Image	Coordinates	Type	Ref.
Sarugahana Caves サルガ鼻洞窟住居跡 Sarugahana dōkutsu jūkyo ato	Matsue	Jomon to Kofun period cave dwelling		35°31′55″N 133°11′43″E	1	2209
Sukumozuka Kofun スクモ塚古墳 Sukumozuka Kofun	Masuda	Kofun period tumulus	Sukumozuka Kofun	34°42′05″N 131°50′54″E	1	2205
Abedani Kofun 安部谷古墳 Abedani kofun	Matsue	Kofun period cave tombs	Abedani Kofun	35°25′28″N 133°06′35″E	1	2180
Yasugi Ichirizuka 安来一里塚 Yasugi ichirizuka	Yasugi	Edo Period milestone on the San'indō		35°25′41″N 133°14′49″E	6	2191
Ijimi Ichirizuka 伊志見一里塚 Ijimi ichirizuka	Matsue	Edo Period milestone on the San'indō		35°23′52″N 132°52′35″E	6	2195
Ikō-ji Gardens 医光寺庭園 Ikō-ji niwa	Masuda	Muromachi period garden; also a Place of Scenic Beauty	Ikō-ji gardens	34°40′49″N 131°51′57″E	8	2165
Oki Kokubun-ji Precinct 隠岐国分寺境内 Oki Kokubun-ji keidai	Okinoshima	Nara period provincial temple of Oki Province	Oki Kokubun-ji	36°13′27″N 133°18′26″E	2, 3	2179
Masuda clan Fortified Residence Sites 益田氏城館跡 Masuda-shi jōkan ato	Masuda	Muromachi period fortifications, designation includes Nanao Castle (七尾城) and Miyake Odoi Site (三宅御土居跡)	Masuda clan Fortified Residence Sites	34°40′23″N 131°51′50″E	2	3405
Okadayama Kofun 岡田山古墳 Okadayama kofun	Matsue	Kofun period tumulus cluster	Okadayama Kofun	35°25′39″N 133°05′29″E	1	2216
Shimokō temple ruins Pagoda Site 下府廃寺塔跡 Shimokō Haiji tō ato	Hamada	Nara period temple ruins		34°55′43″N 132°07′06″E	3	2194
Kamoiwakura Site 加茂岩倉遺跡 Kamoiwakura iseki	Unnan	Yayoi period site; thirty-nine NT dōtaku from excavations are now at the Shimane Museum of Ancient Izumo (see List of National Treasures of Japan (archaeological materials))	Kamoiwakura Site	35°21′38″N 132°52′59″E	1	3222
Iwayajiato Kofun 岩屋寺跡古墳 Iwayajiato kofun	Matsue	Kofun period cave tombs	Iwayajiato Kofun	35°25′22″N 133°00′20″E	1	2210
Iwafune Kofun 岩舟古墳 Iwafune kofun	Yasugi	Kofun period tumulus	Iwafune Kofun	35°24′00″N 133°11′25″E	1	2211
Kinzaki Kofun Cluster 金崎古墳群 Kinzaki kofun-gun	Matsue	Kofun period tumulus cluster	Kinzaki Kofun Cluster	35°29′25″N 133°04′11″E	1	2212
Gongenyama Caves Main Cave 権現山洞窟住居跡 Gongenyama dōkutsu jūkyo ato	Matsue	Jomon to Kofun period cave dwelling		35°32′37″N 133°12′35″E	1	2207
Kōjindani Site 荒神谷遺跡 Kōjindani iseki	Izumo	Kofun period sword factory; NT excavated artefacts are now at the Shimane Museum of Ancient Izumo; (see List of National Treasures of Japan (archaeological materials))	Kōjindani Site	35°22′36″N 132°51′09″E	1	2224
Arashima Kofun Cluster 荒島古墳群 Arashima Kofun cluster	Yasugi	Yayoi to Kofun period tumuli cluster	Arashima kofun-gun	35°25′47″N 133°11′55″E	1	2190
Kunidominakamura Kofun 国富中村古墳 Kunidominakamura kofun	Izumo	Kofun period tumulus	Kunidominakamura Kofun	35°25′39″N 132°48′03″E	1	00003784
Imaichi Dainenji Kofun 今市大念寺古墳 Imaichi Dainenji kofun	Izumo	Kofun period tumulus	Imaichi Dainenji Kofun	35°21′47″N 132°45′52″E	1	2158
Sada-Kōbu Shell Mound ja:佐太・講武貝塚 Sada-Kōbu kaizuka	Matsue	Jomon period shell midden		35°31′00″N 133°00′34″E	1	2177
Yamashiro Futagozuka Kofun 山代二子塚古墳 Yamashiro Futagozuka	Matsue	Kofun period tumulus	Yamashiro Futagozuka Kofun	35°26′21″N 133°05′15″E	1	2154
Yamashiro hōfun 山代方墳 Yamashiro hōfun	Matsue	Kofun period tumulus		35°26′21″N 133°05′21″E	1	2204
Sufu Kofun 周布古墳 Sufu Kofun	Hamada	Kofun period tumulus		34°51′18″N 132°01′05″E	1	2190
Izumo Tamatsukuri site 出雲玉作跡 Izumo tama-tsukuri ato	Matsue	Kofun- to Heian-period workshop for magatama, round beads, and other jewels	Izumo Tamatsukuri site	35°24′50″N 133°00′41″E	6	2153
Izumo Province Yamashiro-gō Sites 出雲国山代郷遺跡群 Izumo-no-kuni yamashiro-gō iseki-gun	Matsue			35°25′59″N 133°05′16″E	2, 3	2223
Izumo Kokufu ruins 出雲国府跡 Izumo kofufu	Matsue	Nara period provincial capital of Izumo Province		35°25′49″N 133°06′07″E	2	2221
Izumo Kokubun-ji ruins 出雲国分寺跡附古道 Izumo kokubunji ato tsuketari kodō	Matsue	Nara period provincial temple of Izumo Province; designation includes a section of old road	Izumo Kokubun-ji ruins	35°26′19″N 133°06′38″E	3	2149
Shussai-Iwano Ichirizuka 出西・伊波野一里塚 Shussai-Iwano ichirizuka	Izumo	Edo period milestone on the San'indō		35°22′33″N 132°48′24″E	6	2196
Lafcadio Hearn Former Residence 小泉八雲旧居 Koizumi Yakumo kyū-kyo	Matsue	Edo period residence; home of noted Meiji period author	Lafcadio Hearn Former Residence	35°28′45″N 133°02′58″E	8	2203
Matsue Castle 松江城 Matsue-jō	Matsue	Edo period castle	Matsue Castle	35°28′29″N 133°03′02″E	2	2181
Matsue Domain Matsudaira clan cemetery 松江藩主松平家墓所 'Matsue-han-shu Matsudaira-ke bosho'	Matsue	Daimyo cemetery	Matsue Domain Matsudaira Clan cemetery	35°28′20″N 133°02′22″E	7	2226
Kamienyajizōyama Kofun 上塩冶地蔵山古墳 Kamienyajizōyama kofun	Izumo	Kofun period tumulus	Kamienyajizōyama kofun	35°20′46″N 132°45′34″E	1	2257
Kamienyatsukiyama Kofun 上塩冶築山古墳 Kamienyatsukiyama kofun	Izumo	Kofun period tumulus	Kamienyatsukiyama kofun	35°21′00″N 132°45′38″E	1	2256
Ageshima Kofun 上島古墳 Ageshima Kofun	Izumo	Kofun period tumulus	Ageshima Kofun	35°25′24″N 132°48′00″E	1	2213
Mori Ōgai Former Residence 森鴎外旧宅 Mori Ōgai kyū-taku	Tsuwano	Meiji period statesman residence	Mori Ōgai Former Residence	34°27′28″N 131°46′07″E	8	2218
Kanden-an 菅田庵 Kanden-an	Matsue	Edo Period tea arbor and garden, also a Place of Scenic Beauty		35°29′17″N 133°03′43″E	8	2162
Nishi Amane Former Residence 西周旧居 Nishi Amane kyū-kyo	Tsuwano	Meiji period statesman residence	Nishi Amane Former Residence	34°27′27″N 131°46′02″E	8	2225
Nishidani Tumulus cluster 西谷墳墓群 Nishidani funbo-gun	Izumo	Yayoi period tumulus cluster	Nishi Amane Former Residence	35°21′31″N 132°46′48″E	1	3253
Ishiya Kofun 石屋古墳 Ishiya kofun	Matsue	Kofun period tumulus	Ishiya Kofun	35°27′03″N 133°06′07″E	1	2222
Iwami Ginzan Site 石見銀山遺跡 Iwami Ginzan Silver Mine	Ōda	central component of the UNESCO World Heritage Site Iwami Ginzan Silver Mine and its Cultural Landscape	Iwami ginzan iseki	35°05′48″N 132°26′29″E	2, 6	2217
Iwami Kokubun-ji ruins 石見国分寺跡 Iwami Kokubunji ato	Hamada	Nara-period provincial temple of Iwami Province		34°56′38″N 132°07′07″E	1	2150
Ōbaniwatorizuka Tumulus 大庭鶏塚 Ōbaniwatorizuka	Matsue	Kofun period tumulus		35°26′16″N 133°05′08″E	1	2155
Tangean Kofun 丹花庵古墳 Tangean kofun	Matsue	Kofun period tumulus		35°28′58″N 132°59′42″E	1	2175
Nakazu-Higashihara Site 中須東原遺跡 Nakazu-Higashihara iseki	Masuda	Kamakura to Muromachi period port settlement ruins		34°40′30″N 131°50′34″E	1	00003840
Chūsenji Kofun Cluster 仲仙寺古墳群 Chūsenji Kofun cluster	Yasugi	Yayoi to Kofun period tumuli cluster		35°25′15″N 133°12′50″E	1	2220
Inome Cave 猪目洞窟遺物包含層 Inome dōkutsu ibutsu hōgansō	Izumo	Jomon to Kofun period cave dwelling		35°26′31″N 132°42′30″E	1	2214
Tsuwano Castle ruins 津和野城跡 Tsuwano-jō ato	Tsuwano	Muromachi to Edo-period castle ruins	Tsuwano Castle	34°27′33″N 131°45′44″E	2	2206
Tagi Sakurai family tatara steelworks sites 田儀櫻井家たたら製鉄遺跡 Tagi Sakurai-ke tatara seitetsu iseki	Izumo	Edo Period Tatara steelworks sites		35°14′09″N 132°36′53″E	6	00003475
Tawayama ruins 田和山遺跡 Tawayama iseki	Matsue	Yayoi period settlement trace		35°26′18″N 133°03′14″E	1	3303
Tokurenba Kofun 徳連場古墳 Tokurenba kofun	Matsue	Kofun period tumulus	Tokurenba Kofun	35°25′07″N 133°00′50″E	1	2174
Toda Castle ruins 富田城 Toda-jō ato	Yasugi		Gassantoda Castle	35°21′47″N 133°11′00″E	2	2178
Takarazuka Kofun 宝塚古墳 Takarazuka Kofun	Izumo	Kofun period tumulus		35°20′21″N 132°44′00″E	1	2168
Manpuku-ji Gardens 万福寺庭園 Manpuku-ji niwa	Masuda	Muromachi period garden; also a Place of Scenic Beauty	Manpuku-ji gardens	34°40′44″N 131°51′36″E	8	2164
San'indō 山陰道; San'indō	Tsuwano	remains of the Edo-period road; designation includes the Kamō Pass (蒲生峠越), Toku-jō Pass (徳城峠越), and Nosaka Pass (野坂峠越), and an area of Iwami in Tottori Prefecture		35°31′23″N 134°24′23″E	6	
Gakuen-ji Precinct 鰐淵寺境内 Gakuenji keidai	Izumo	Buddhist temple	Gakuen-ji	35°24′55″N 132°44′47″E	3	00003932
Tsuwano Domain Kamei Clan Cemetery 津和野藩主亀井家墓所附亀井茲矩墓; Tsuwano-han-shu Kamei-ke bosho tsuketari Kamei Korenori no haka	Tsuwano	designation includes the grave of Kamei Korenori and an area of Tottori in Tottori Prefecture		34°28′01″N 131°46′23″E	7	
Iwami Ginzan Kaidō 石見銀山街道; Iwami ginzan kaidō	Misato	Tomogauradō (鞆ヶ浦道) and Yunotsu-Okidomaridô (温泉津沖泊道) in Ōda are components of the UNESCO World Heritage Site Iwami Ginzan Silver Mine and its Cultural Landscape		35°04′36″N 132°35′28″E		
Izumo Province San'indō Site 出雲国山陰道跡; Izumo no kuni San'in-dō ato	Izumo			35°22′07″N 132°45′14″E		
Ōmoto Kofun 大元古墳 Ōmoto Kofun	Masuda	Kofun period tumulus		34°42′06″N 131°52′03″E	8	00004098
Kuki Silver Mine ruins 久喜銀山遺跡 Kuki ginzan iseki	Ōnan	Sengoku to Meiji period industrial site		34°49′26″N 132°34′11″E	1	00004145

== Prefectural Historic Sites ==
As of 24 June 2021, fifty-nine Sites have been designated as being of prefectural importance.

Site	Municipality	Comments	Image	Coordinates	Type	Ref.
Iwami Kokubunni-ji Site 石見国分尼寺跡; Iwami Kokubunniji ato	Hamada	provincial nunnery of Iwami Province		34°56′40″N 132°07′20″E		for all refs see
Kuroki Gosho 黒木御所; Kuroki gosho	Nishinoshima			36°06′41″N 133°02′41″E		
Unohana Kofun Cluster 鵜ノ花古墳群; Unohana kofun-gun	Masuda			34°43′19″N 131°51′18″E		
Hanareyama Kofun 放れ山古墳; Hanareyama kofun	Izumo			35°20′13″N 132°44′35″E		
Unshū Kumura Nagasawa Ware Kiln Site 雲州久邑長沢焼窯跡; Unshū Kumura Nagasawa-yaki kama ato	Izumo			35°17′53″N 132°39′00″E		
Furutenjin Kofun 古天神古墳; Furutenjin kofun	Matsue			35°25′28″N 133°06′25″E		
Tamatsukuri Tsukiyama Kofun 玉造築山古墳; Tamatsukuri Tsukiyama kofun	Matsue			35°24′53″N 133°00′29″E		
Hamada Castle Site 浜田城跡; Hamada-jō ato	Hamada			34°54′10″N 132°04′24″E		
Usuibara Kofun 薄井原古墳; Usuibara kofun	Matsue			35°30′23″N 133°05′39″E		
Matsumoto No.1 Kofun 松本第1号古墳; Matsumoto daiichi-gō kofun	Unnan			35°17′57″N 132°52′36″E		
Myōrenjiyama Kofun 妙蓮寺山古墳; Myōrenjiyama kofun	Izumo			35°20′13″N 132°44′19″E		
Mizawa Castle Site 三沢城跡; Mizawa-jō ato	Okuizumo			35°12′14″N 132°57′45″E		
Washihara Hachiman-gū Yabusame Baba 鷲原八幡宮流鏑馬馬場; Washihara Hachiman-gū yabusame baba	Tsuwano			34°27′16″N 131°45′24″E		
Kosaka Kofun 小坂古墳; Kosaka kofun	Izumo			35°20′01″N 132°45′51″E		
Iwami Kokubun-ji Tile Kiln Site 石見国分寺瓦窯跡; Iwami Kokubunji kawara kama ato	Hamada			34°56′36″N 132°07′03″E		
Kaminiwa Iwafuneyama Kofun 神庭岩船山古墳; Kaminiwa Iwafuneyama kofun	Izumo			35°23′32″N 132°51′18″E		
Tsuwano Domain Yōrōkan 津和野藩校養老館; Tsuwano hankō Yōrōkan	Tsuwano			34°28′03″N 131°46′28″E		
Himezuka Kofun 毘売塚古墳; Himezuka kofun	Yasugi			35°25′39″N 133°15′42″E		
Hei Jinja Kofun 平神社古墳; Hei Jinja kofun	Okinoshima			36°13′10″N 133°18′12″E		
Ōkusa Iwafune Kofun 大草岩船古墳; Ōkusa Iwafune kofun	Matsue			35°25′24″N 133°06′29″E		
Higashi-Hyakuzuka Kofun Cluster 東百塚山古墳群; Higashi-Hyakuzuka kofun-gun	Matsue	52 burials		35°25′25″N 133°06′20″E		
Nishi-Hyakuzuka Kofun Cluster 西百塚山古墳群; Nishi-Hyakuzuka kofun-gun	Matsue	32 burials		35°25′27″N 133°06′15″E		
Iwayaato Kofun 岩屋後古墳; Iwayaato kofun	Matsue			35°25′36″N 133°05′35″E		
Misakiyama Kofun 御崎山古墳; Misakiyama kofun	Matsue			35°25′29″N 133°05′35″E		
Kojimbata-Ushirodani Kofun Cluster 荒神谷・後谷古墳群; Kojimbata-Ushirodani kofun-gun	Matsue			35°25′40″N 133°04′40″E		
Warita Kofun 割田古墳; Warita kofun	Ōnan			34°53′44″N 132°26′52″E		
Jūnanbara No.1 Tumulus 順庵原1号墳墓; Jūnanbara ichigō funbo	Ōnan			34°51′01″N 132°30′55″E		
Oki Kokubunni-ji Site 隠岐国分尼寺跡; Oki Kokubunniji ato	Okinoshima	provincial nunnery of Oki Province		36°13′16″N 133°18′49″E		
Nanao Castle Site - Myōgi-ji Precinct 七尾城跡附妙義寺境内; Nanao-jō ato tsuketari Myōgiji keidai	Masuda			36°06′41″N 133°02′41″E		
Tamawaka Sumikoto Jinja Kofun Cluster 玉若酢命神社古墳群; Tamawaka Sumikoto Jinja kofun-gun	Okinoshima			36°12′28″N 133°18′45″E		
Izumo Kokubun-ji Tile Kiln Site 出雲国分寺瓦窯跡; Izumo Kokubunji kawara kama ato	Matsue			35°26′24″N 133°06′52″E		
Shiiyama No.1 Tumulus 椎山第1号墳; Shiiyama daiichi-gō fun	Matsue			35°24′02″N 132°55′49″E		
Iwami Ginzan Goryō Aoyama Family Residence Tagiya 石見銀山 御料郷宿田儀屋遺宅青山家; Iwami Ginzan Goryō-gō yado Tagiya itaku Aoyama-ke	Ōda			35°07′12″N 132°26′48″E		
Iwami Ginzan Goryō Kanamori Family Residence Izuya 石見銀山 御料郷宿泉屋遺宅金森家; Iwami Ginzan Goryō-gō yado Izuya itaku Kanamori-ke	Ōda					
Iwami Ginzan Daikansho Yanagiwara Family Residence 石見銀山 代官所同心遺宅柳原家; Iwami Ginzan daikansho Dōshin itaku Yanagiwara-ke	Ōda					
Iwami Ginzan Daikansho Oka Family Residence 石見銀山 代官所地役人遺宅岡家; Iwami Ginzan daikansho chiyakunin itaku Oka-ke	Ōda			35°07′18″N 132°26′48″E		
Iwami Ginzan Daikansho Miyake Family Residence 石見銀山 代官所地役人遺宅三宅家; Iwami Ginzan daikansho chiyakunin itaku Miyake-ke	Ōda					
Jūōmen Cave Tomb Cluster 十王免横穴群; Jūōmen yokoana-gun	Matsue			35°26′30″N 133°05′54″E		
Shingūtō Fortified Residence Site 新宮党館跡; Shingūtō tate ato	Matsue			35°21′40″N 133°11′07″E		
Iwami Ginzan Magistrates Grave Sites 石見銀山遺跡 奉行・代官墓所; Iwami Ginzan iseki bugyō・daikan bosho	Ōda	7 tombs of bugyō and daikan at Shōgen-ji (勝源寺) and Myōren-ji (妙蓮寺)		35°07′20″N 132°26′46″E		
Iwami Ginzan Daikansho Abe Family Residence 石見銀山 代官所地役人遺宅阿部家; Iwami Ginzan daikansho chiyakunin itaku Abe-ke	Ōda					
Hōonji Kofun Cluster 報恩寺古墳群; Hōonji kofun-gun	Matsue	6 burials		35°25′31″N 133°00′10″E		
Miyata Site 宮田遺跡; Miyata iseki	Unnan			35°15′28″N 132°52′16″E		
Nogi Futagozuka Kofun 乃木二子塚古墳; Nogi Futagozuka kofun	Matsue			35°26′33″N 133°03′42″E		
Kagechi Tatara Site 陰地たたら跡; Kagechi tatara ato	Okuizumo			35°10′24″N 133°02′28″E		
Myōjin Kofun 明神古墳; Myōjin kofun	Ōda			35°09′22″N 132°24′29″E		
Mitoya Castle Sites 三刀屋じゃ山城跡及び三刀屋尾崎城跡; Mitoya Jayama-jō ato oyobi Mitoya Ozaki-jō ato	Unnan			35°17′37″N 132°52′19″E		
Shinmakihara Site 新槙原遺跡; Shinmakihara iseki	Masuda			34°38′27″N 132°05′30″E		
Yamashiro Minamishinzō-in Site 山代郷南新造院跡; Yamashiro-gō Minamishinzō-in ato	Matsue			35°25′58″N 133°05′34″E		
Meotoiwa Site 女夫岩遺跡; Meotoiwa iseki	Matsue			35°23′43″N 132°54′32″E		
Anagami Cave Tomb Cluster 穴神横穴墓群; Anagami yokoana bogun	Yasugi			35°24′16″N 133°18′54″E		
Yamashiro Minamishinzō-in Tile Kiln Site 山代郷南新造院瓦窯跡; Yamashiro-gō Minamishinzō-in kawara kama ato	Matsue			35°25′54″N 133°05′30″E		
Ōmoto Kofun Cluster 大元古墳群; Ōmoto kofun-gun	Masuda			34°42′11″N 131°52′13″E		
Kōmyō-ji No.3 Tomb 光明寺3号墓; Kōmyōji sangō haka	Izumo			35°20′22″N 132°46′00″E		
Ōshiro Site 大城遺跡; Ōshiro iseki	Okinoshima			36°12′40″N 133°19′38″E		
Horibe No.1 Site 堀部第１遺跡; Horibe daiichi iseki	Matsue			35°31′19″N 133°01′36″E		
Narahama Site 波来浜遺跡; Narahama iseki	Gōtsu			35°02′42″N 132°18′14″E		
Maruyama Castle Site 丸山城跡; Maruyama-jō ato	Kawamoto			34°58′53″N 132°24′22″E		
Nashinokizaka Site 梨ノ木坂遺跡; Nashinokizaka iseki	Ōda					

== Municipal Historic Sites ==
As of 1 May 2020, a further one hundred and fifty-seven Sites have been designated as being of municipal importance.

== See also ==
- Cultural Properties of Japan
- Iwami Province
- Izumo Province
- Oki Province
- Shimane Museum of Ancient Izumo
- List of Places of Scenic Beauty of Japan (Shimane)
- List of Cultural Properties of Japan – paintings (Shimane)
