= Tangean Kofun =

- 丹花庵古墳 (Japanese)
- Tangean Kofun Tangean Kofun (Japan)
- Interactive map of Tangean Kofun
- 35°28′57.7″N 132°59′41.6″E
- Type: Kofun
- Periods: Kofun period
- Location: Matsue, Shimane, Japan
- Region: San'in region

History
- Built: c.5th century

The Tangean Kofun (丹花庵古墳) is a Kofun period burial mound, located in the Kososhicho neighborhood of the city of Matsue, Shimane in the San'in region of Japan. The tumulus was designated a National Historic Site of Japan in 1933.

== Overview ==
The Tangean Kofun is a rectangular hōfun (方墳) tumulus dating from the middle of the Kofun period. Although the mound has been considerably degraded to the extent that the lid of the stone sarcophagus is exposed, it measures approximately 47 meters on each side and 3.5 meters in height, and is built in two stages. Both haniwa and fukiishi. The 2.08 meter lid stone of the sarcophagus is a slightly curved and has geometric patterns carved into it. Since it has been exposed for perhaps centuries, no grave goods remain, but fragments of a short armor and an iron sword have been unearthed. The tumulus is on private property with limited public access, and an explanatory placard once at the site was removed in 2018. The tumulus is approximately one kilometer to the east of from Asahigaoka Station (Shimane) on the Ichibata Electric Railway.

== See also ==
- List of Historic Sites of Japan (Shimane)
