= Iwayajiato Kofun =

- 岩屋寺跡古墳 (Japanese)
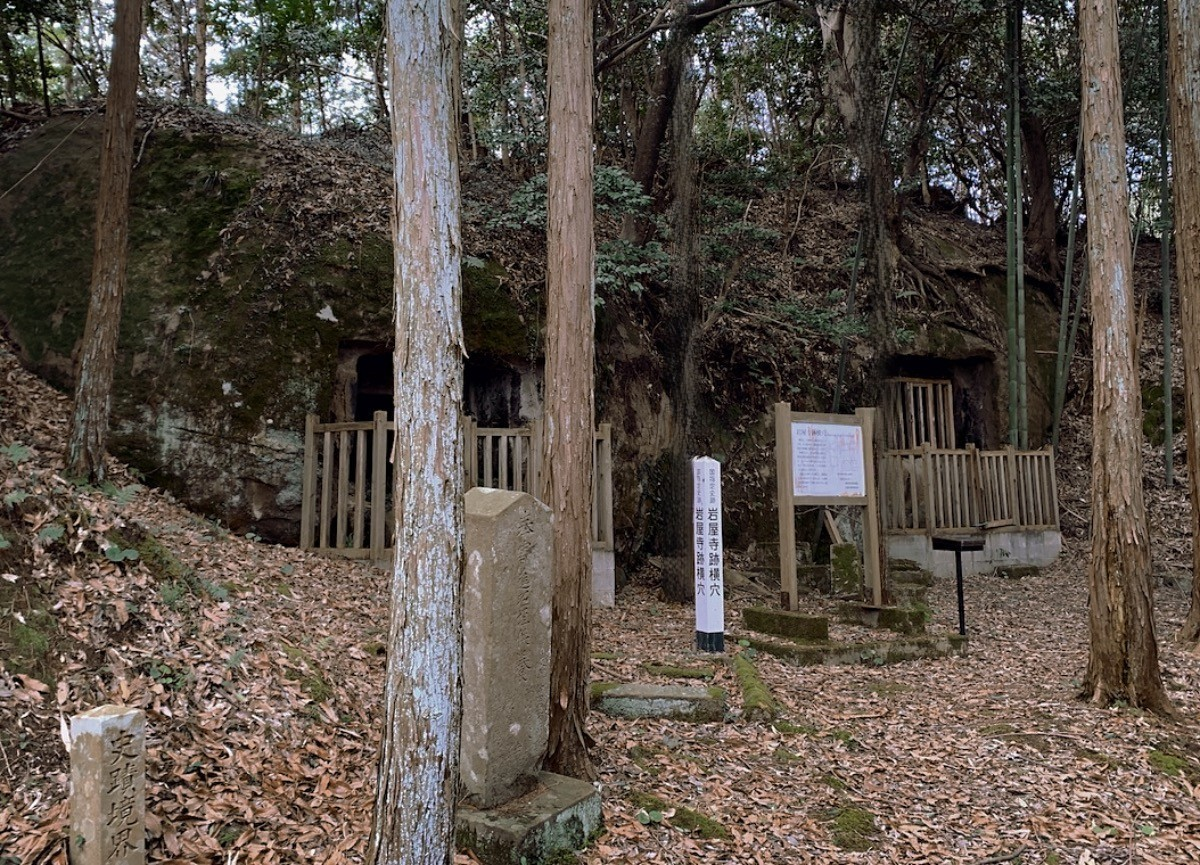
- Iwayajiato Kofun

- Iwayajiato Kofun Iwayajiato Kofun (Japan)
- Interactive map of Iwayajiato Kofun
- 35°25′22″N 133°00′20″E
- Type: Kofun
- Periods: Kofun period
- Location: Matsue, Shimane, Japan
- Region: San'in region

History
- Built: c.6th century

Site notes
- Public access: Yes (no facilities)

The Iwayajiato Kofun (岩屋寺跡古墳) is a cluster of two Kofun period yokoanabo (横穴墓), tunnel tombs in artificial caves, located in the Tamayu neighborhood of the city of Matsue, Shimane in the San'in region of Japan. The cluster of tombs was collectively designated a National Historic Site of Japan in 1948.

== Overview ==
The Iwayajiato Kofun is located at the foot of a hill called Iwaya. It was the site of a Buddhist temple called Iwaya-ji, which was removed in 1876. These horizontal tunnel tombs were excavated into the tuff bedrock of the hill and are located 12 meters apart in a north–south direction. The north tomb has a double burial chamber, with an antechamber that is about 1.8 meters long, 2.4 meters wide and two meters high, with a three-step cut stone entrance. The south tomb has a single burial chamber, 2.3 meters in length, 2.9 meters in width, and about 2.3 meters in height. Both burial chambers are characterized by careful construction, shaped to resemble the stone chambers found in kofun burial mounds, with processing the ceiling into a house shape and embossing the boundary between the roof and the wall. Both have been open since antiquity, so no grave goods have been found. They are estimated to have been built in the 7th century, at the end of the Kofun period.

The site is located about 1.5 kilometers from JR West San'in Main Line Tamatsukurionsen Station.

== See also ==
- List of Historic Sites of Japan (Shimane)
