= Tokurenba Kofun =

Kofun period burial mound in Matsue, Shimane Prefecture, Japan

- 徳連場古墳 (Japanese)
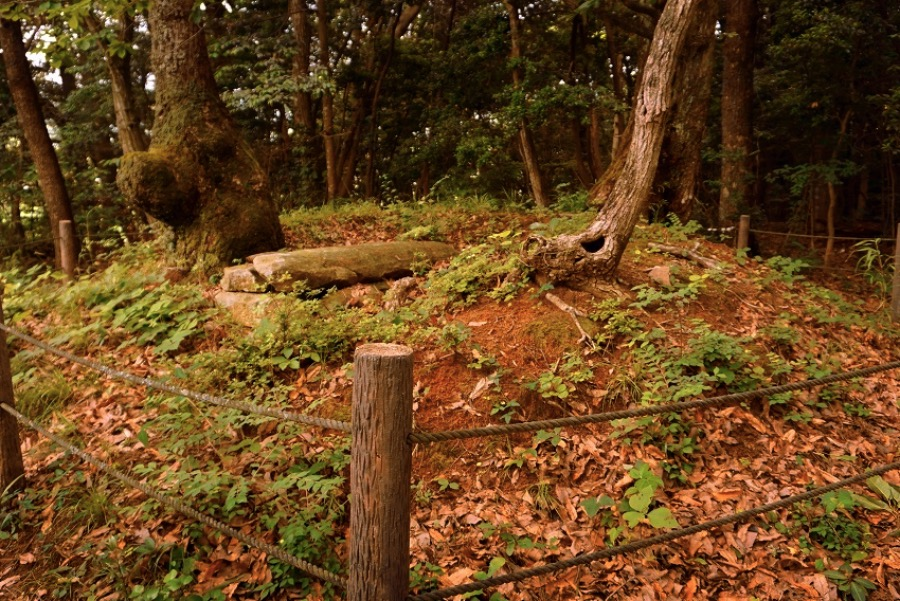
- Tokurenba Kofun

- Tokurenba Kofun Tokurenba Kofun (Japan)
- Interactive map of Tokurenba Kofun
- 35°25′0.7″N 133°00′50″E
- Type: Kofun
- Periods: Kofun period
- Location: Matsue, Shimane, Japan
- Region: San'in region

History
- Built: c.5th century

Site notes
- Public access: Yes (no facilities)

The Tokurenba Kofun (徳連場古墳) is a Kofun period burial mound, located in the Tamayu-cho neighborhood of the city of Matsue, Shimane in the San'in region of Japan. The tumulus was designated a National Historic Site of Japan in 1933.

== Overview ==
The Tokurenba Kofun is located on the eastern hills of the Tamatsukuri hot spring town, just north of the Izumo Tamatsukuri Museum. It is a small circular enpun (円墳)-style tumulus with a diameter of 8.5 meters and a height of 1.5 meters, and is thought to have been constructed around the 5th century. Much of the mound has been eroded away, and the split bamboo-shaped sarcophagus (or boat-shaped sarcophagus) made of white quartz andesitic tuff is exposed in the center of the burial chamber. The sarcophagus has a total length of 2.3 meters and a width of 0.8 meters, and the combination of lid and body is inroguchi style, with four hooks on the lid and two hooks on the body, which is rare in Shimane Prefecture. It is said that an iron sword and agate beads excavated from inside the sarcophagus, but this (and any other grave goods) have been lost. The area around this tumulus was a center for making magatama, round and cylindrical beads from the end of the Yayoi period to the Heian period.

The Imaichi Dainenji Kofun is located about one kilometer to the east of Izumoshi Station on the JR West San'in Main Line.

== See also ==
- List of Historic Sites of Japan (Shimane)
