= Shimokō temple ruins =

- 下府廃寺 (Japanese)
- Shimokō temple ruins Shimokō temple ruins (Japan)
- Interactive map of Shimokō temple ruins
- 34°55′43″N 132°07′06″E
- Type: temple ruins
- Periods: Nara period
- Location: Hamada, Shimane, Japan
- Region: San'in region

History
- Built: 7th century AD

Site notes
- Public access: Yes

Shimokō temple ruins (下府廃寺, Shimokō Haiji ato) is an archaeological site with the ruins of a Nara period Buddhist temple located in the Shimofu neighborhood of the city of Shimane, Tottori Prefecture, in the San'in region of Japan. The foundations of its Pagoda were designated as a National Historic Site in 1937.

== History ==
The Kokubu and Shimokō areas to the east of the center of modern Hamada city was the center of ancient Iwami Province. Locals had long suspected ancient ruins in the area, and the foundation stones of a Japanese pagoda were found when the site was excavated from 1989 to 1992. The roof tiles found are in the style of the Nara period, and it is believed that a large-scale temple was built at this location between the end of the 7th century and the beginning of the 8th century, and was abandoned by the beginning of the 10th century. The temple is not mentioned in any surviving historical records, so its name and history are completely unknown. The area of the temple covered one square chō (about 109 meters square) and occupied a slightly elevated area with an altitude of 14 meters overlooking the Shimokō Plain. The layout of the buildings appears to have been patterned after the temple of Hokki-ji in Ikaruga, Nara. The foundations of the Main Hall occupied a platform measuring 15.2 meters from east-to-west and 13 meters from north-to-south, and the pagoda had a foundation measuring 13.2 meters square, in the center of which was a granite base with a concentric cylindrical hole with an outer diameter of 86 centimeters. The pagoda foundation was designated as a National Historic Site in 1937. The site is about a 20-minute walk from Shimokō Station on the JR West San'in Main Line; however, aside from the foundation stone and an explanatory placard, there is else at the location.

== See also ==
- List of Historic Sites of Japan (Shimane)
