= Kinzaki Kofun Cluster =

Kofun period burial mound cluster in Matsue, Shimane, Japan

Kinzaki Kofun cluster
- 金崎古墳群 (Japanese)
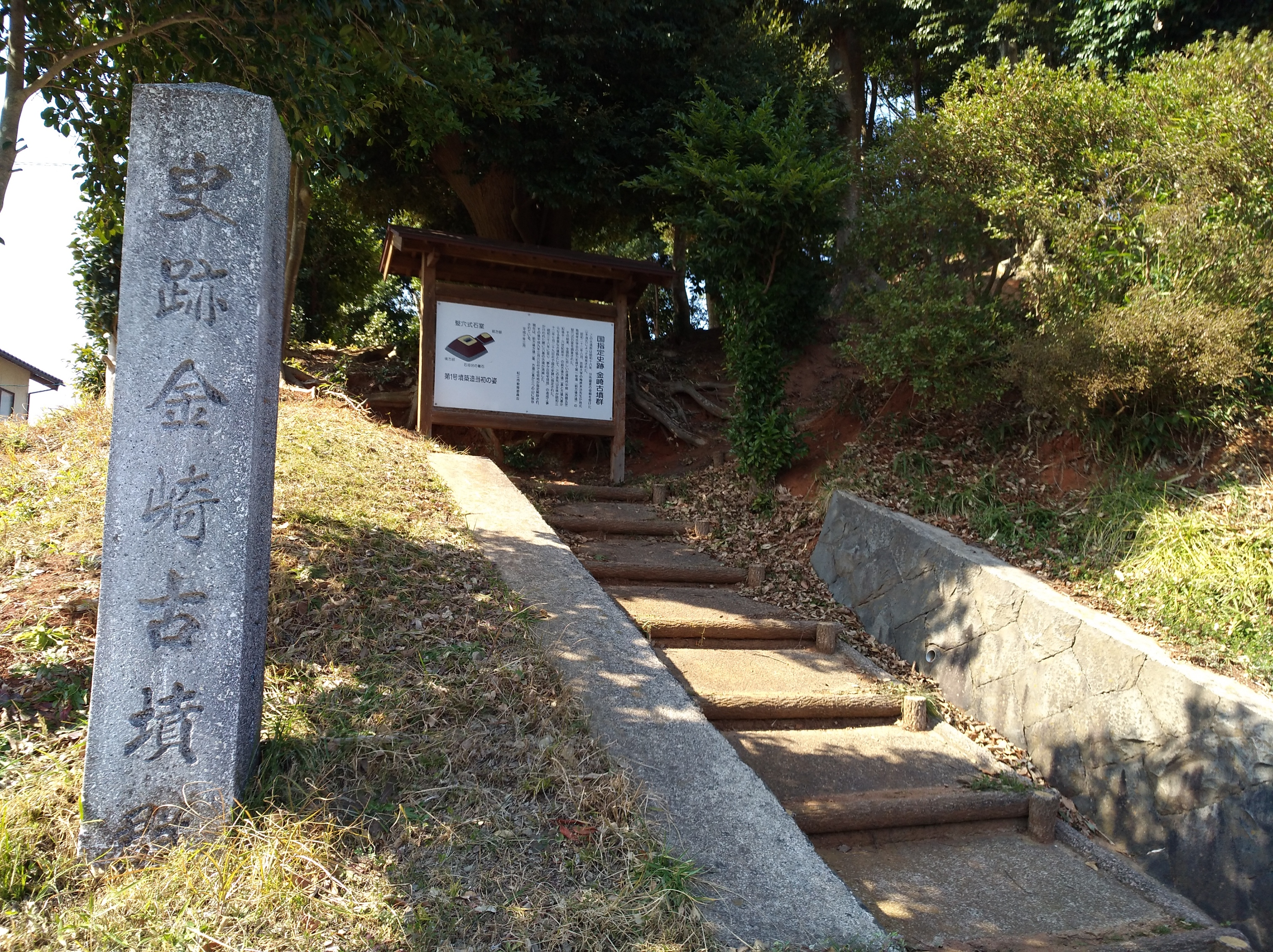
- Kinzaki No.1

- Kinzaki Kofun cluster Kinzaki Kofun Cluster (Japan)
- Interactive map of Kinzaki Kofun cluster
- 35°29′21.5″N 133°04′12.7″E
- Type: Kofun
- Periods: Kofun period
- Location: Matsue, Shimane, Japan
- Region: San'in region

History
- Built: 5th century AD

Site notes
- Public access: Yes

The Kinzaki Kofun cluster (金崎古墳群, Kinzaki Kofun-gun) is a group of Kofun period burial mounds located in Nishikawatsu neighborhood of the city of Matsue, Shimane Prefecture, in the San'in region of Japan. The tumuli were collectively designated a National Historic Site in 1957.

== Overview ==
The Kinzaki Kofun cluster is located behind Shimane University, on a small hill overlooking the lowlands downstream of the Asakumi River to the south. It consists of two "two conjoined rectangles" type (zenpō-kōhō-fun (前方後方墳)), and three square-type (hōfun (方墳)) kofun. There were originally 11 burial mounds, but six were destroyed due to the construction of a nearby housing complex in 1963. Archaeological excavation of Kofun No. 1 in 1947 determined that the burial chamber was a pit-style stone chamber made of split stones. A wide variety of grave goods were excavated, including a bronze mirror with a flower pattern, several magatama and several other types of beads, an iron blade, and Sue ware pottery. The Sue ware belongs to the oldest style in the San'in region, and there are few unusual examples such as vessel stands, vessels with bells, and vessels with legs.

The site is approximately 3.4 kilometers, or a 40-minute walk, north of Matsue Station on the JR West San'in Main Line.

Kinzaki Kofun cluster
Name	Type	Size
Kinzaki No.1	zenpō-kōhō-fun	total length 32 meters: anterior: 12 x 14 x 1 meters; posterior 20 x 23.5 x 3 meters
Kinzaki No. 2	hōfun	10 x 10 x 1 meters
Kinzaki No. 3	hōfun	20 x 20 x 2 meters
Kinzaki No. 4	hōfun	26.5 x 17 x 3 meters
Kinzaki No.5	zenpō-kōhō-fun	total length 22 meters: anterior: 5 x 7.5 x 1 meters; posterior 17 x 20 x 2.5 meters

== See also ==
- List of Historic Sites of Japan (Shimane)
