= Tagi Sakurai family tatara steelworks sites =

Tagisakurai Family Tatara Steelworks site
- 田儀櫻井家たたら製鉄遺跡 (Japanese)
- Tagisakurai Family Tatara Steelworks Tagi Sakurai family tatara steelworks sites (Japan)
- 35°14′09″N 132°36′53″E
- Type: Pre-modern Industrial site
- Periods: Edo period
- Location: Izumo, Shimane, Japan
- Region: San'in region

History
- Built: 17-19 centuries

Site notes
- Elevation: 10 m (33 ft)
- Public access: Yes
- National Historic Site of Japan

The Tagisakurai Family Tatara Steelworks Site (田儀櫻井家たたら製鉄遺跡, Tagisakurai-ke Tatara Seitetsu Iseki) group of Edo period sites connected with pre-modern steel production in what is now the Taki neighborhood of the city of Izumo, Shimane in the San'in region of Japan. The sites were collectively designated a National Historic Site in 2006.

== Overview ==
Steel production in Japan using the tatara process with ironsand was conducted in the Kibi Province, which later became the base of the Bizen school of swordsmithing, around the middle of the sixth century, and later spread from Kibi to various places in Japan. In western Japan, a low box-shaped furnace different from the Chinese and Korean style was used to refine iron, and in eastern Japan, both a low box-shaped furnace and a vertical furnace unique to Japan were used.Tatara steelmaking came to be carried out in a stereotyped building called takadono (高殿), and a space called Hondoko (本床), where charcoal is laid, and a space called Kobune (小舟), which has a tunnel-like gap, were installed under the steelmaking furnace, completing the underground structure known as Hondoko zuri (本床釣り). In the late 1600s, tatara steelmaking adopted a revolutionary invention. It is a foot-operated blower called a tembin fuigo (天秤鞴), which can blow a large amount of air into the furnace to increase the temperature. As a result, high quality steel can be produced in large quantities.

For approximately 250 years, from the early Edo period until 1890, the Tagisakurai family was based in the Miyamoto district of what is now Taki Town, located in a valley in central Shimane Prefecture. At the time, the area encompassing the tatara forge and its associated buildings, as well as the settlements of those who worked there, was called "Sannai". The people of Sannai were skilled craftsmen and distinguished from the surrounding villages. While the Tagisakurai family was abolished during the Meiji period, related remains remain in good condition in the forest. The Miyamoto Kaji Sannai Site (宮本鍛冶山内遺跡) includes the Tagisakurai family's main residence, their family temple, Chiko-in, the cemeteries of past heads of the family, a large forge, the Sannai settlement, and Kanayago Shrine. The surrounding area is also home to numerous smelting sites that supplied the Tagisakurai family with iron materials.

The Asahi Tatara Site (朝日たたら跡), located 8 kilometers from the Miyamoto district, retains the entire smelting furnace in good condition. Excavated artifacts confirm that the smelting was in operation from the early to mid-19th century, consistent with the legend that the Tagisakurai family operated in this area.

The Miyamoto Kaji Sannai Site and Asahi Tatara Site were designated as National Historic Sites in 2006 under the name of the "Tagisakurai Family Tatara Ironmaking Ruins".

In 2009 , two additional sites, the Hijiridani Tatara Site (聖谷たたら跡) and the Koedo Tatara Site (越堂たたら跡) in Taki Town, were added to the list.

The Miyamoto Kaji Yamauchi Ruins is approximately a 20-minute drive from Tagi Station on the JR West San'in Main Line.

== See also ==
- List of Historic Sites of Japan (Shimane)
