= Inome Cave =

Archaeological site in Izumo, Japan

Inome cave
- 猪目洞窟 (Japanese)
- Inome cave Inome Cave (Japan)
- Interactive map of Inome cave
- 35°26′31″N 132°42′30″E
- Periods: Jōmon to Kofun period
- Location: Izumo, Shimane, Japan
- Region: San'in region

Site notes
- Public access: Yes

The Inome cave (猪目洞窟, Inome dōkutsu) is an archaeological site consisting of a cave dwelling in the Inome neighborhood of the city of Izumo, Shimane Prefecture in the San'in region of Japan. The site was designated a National Historic Site of Japan in 1986.

== Overview ==
The Inome cave is a large sea erosion cave located at the western end of Inome Bay on the coast of the Sea of Japan. The mouth of the cave faces east and is 36 meters wide, 12 meters high at the center, and 50 meters deep. In October 1948, during restoration work on the Inome fishing port, various relics were discovered by chance in the sand and gravel which had accumulated on the floor of this cave. Archaeological excavation revealed that the artifacts were in well-preserved stratigraphic layers and consisted of Jōmon pottery, Yayoi pottery, Kaisen and Haji ware, Sue ware, various wooden products, and more than a dozen human bones. The skeleton of a man buried in a supine position with earthenware from the late Yayoi period, and six shell rings on his right arm was found intact, as was a dugout canoe from the Kofun period presumed to have been used for a burial. In addition, many natural relics such as shellfish, animal and fish bones, rice and other edible seeds, and pieces of wood were recovered. The relics excavated from this cave are designated as Shimane Prefecture Tangible Cultural Properties. The excavated artifacts are stored in the neighboring Inome Cave Artifacts Inclusion Layer Museum.

Also, it is believed that this cave is referred to as 'Yomi no Ana' (Entrance to the Underworld) in the Nara period Izumo no Kuni Fudoki.

The site is located about 30 minutes by car from Unshū-Hirata Station on the Ichibata Electric Railway Kita-Matsue Line.

== See also ==
- List of Historic Sites of Japan (Shimane)
