= Abedani Kofun =

- 安部谷古墳 (Japanese)
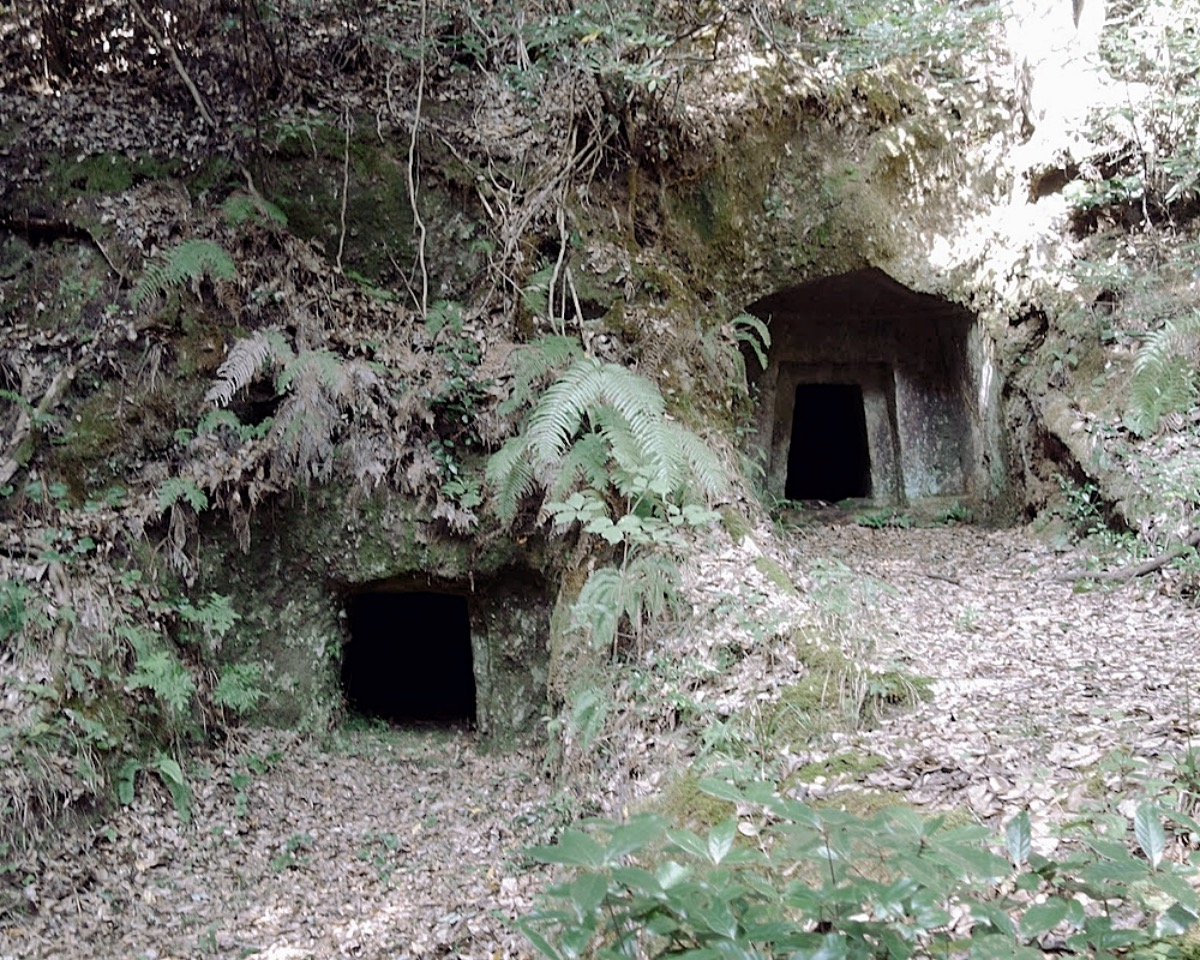
- Abedani Kofun

- Abedani Kofun Abedani Kofun (Japan)
- 35°25′28″N 133°06′35″E
- Type: Kofun
- Periods: Kofun period
- Location: Matsue, Shimane, Japan
- Region: San'in region

History
- Built: c.6th century

Site notes
- Public access: Yes (no facilities)
- National Historic Site of Japan

The Abedani Kofun (安部谷古墳) is a cluster of five Kofun period yokoanabo located in the Ōkusa neighborhood of the city of Matsue, Shimane in the San'in region of Japan. The cluster of tombs was collectively designated a National Historic Site of Japan in 1934.

== Overview ==
The Abedani Kofun is located in the Ōkusa hills area to the south of the Iu River, which is an area known for its many burial mounds. The Abedani Kofun cluster has 15 small kofun, mostly square hōfun (方墳) or circular empun (円墳), the largest of which has a diameter of 20 meters located on the ridge of a hill, and there are six horizontal corridor-type tombs of the western slope of the hill and four on the eastern slope. These horizontal corridor tombs were excavated in the breccia tuff bedrock of the hill and many more are believed to remain undiscovered in the undergrowth.

Of these horizontal corridor-type tombs, five lined up in a row at an elevation of 25 meters are covered by the National Historic Site designation. These tombs are numbered from 1 to 5, and none of them have a true passageway, but only a small burial chamber, which is shaped to resemble the stone chambers found in kofun burial mounds. Tomb No. 5 is believed have been under construction and never completed as its interior walls are still roughly shaped. Tombs No. 1 to No. 4 have flat burial chambers, with coffin platforms on the left and right sides. Tomb No. 1 is about 2.7 meters wide, about 1.88 meters deep, and about 1.67 meter high, and has a double-chamber structure with a front room and a back room. Tombs No. 2 and No. 3 are single-chambered, and all four tombs have ridges on the boundary lines between the four walls and the ceiling, and relief carvings on the lines of the ridges. Grave goods recovered include Sue ware pottery, cylindrical haniwa, fragments of horse harnesses and horse bits. Judging from the style of the Sue ware, it is believed that these cave tombs were built in the latter half of the 6th century to the first half of the 7th century.

The Abedani Kofun is 3.3 kilometers from Higashi-Matsue Station on the JR West San'in Main Line and is 800 meters from the Izumo Kokufu ruins.

== See also ==
- List of Historic Sites of Japan (Shimane)
