= Izumo Province Yamashiro-gō Sites =

- 出雲国山代郷遺跡群 (Japanese)
- Izumo Province Yamashiro-gō Sites Izumo Province Yamashiro-gō Sites (Japan)
- Interactive map of Izumo Province Yamashiro-gō Sites
- 35°25′59″N 133°05′16″E
- Periods: Nara - Heian period
- Location: Matsue, Shimane, Japan
- Region: San'in region

History
- Built: 8th-9th century AD

Site notes
- Area: 95,872.98 m^{2} (1,031,968.2 sq ft)
- Public access: Yes

The Izumo Province Yamashiro-gō Sites (出雲国山代郷遺跡群, Izumo-no-kuni yamashiro-gō iseki-gun) is an archaeological site with the ruins of a Nara to Heian period government administrative complex located in what is now the Oba-cho, Yata-cho, and Yamashiro-cho neighborhoods of the city of Matsue in Shimane prefecture in the San'in region of Japan. The site has been protected as a National Historic Site from 1980, with the area under protection expanded in 2002.

== Overview ==
In the late Nara period, after the establishment of a centralized government under the Ritsuryō system, local rule over the provinces was standardized under a kokufu (provincial capital), and each province was divided into smaller administrative districts, known as (郡, gun, kōri), composed of 2–20 townships in 715 AD. Each of the administrative units had a government complex, or kanga (官衙遺跡) built on a semi-standardized layout based on contemporary Chinese design, and nearby was a warehouse complex for storing tax rice and other taxable produce and an official Buddhist temple.

=== Yamashirō-go Shōkura ruins ===
During archaeological excavations from 1978 to 1980 in an area called Oba Crossroads, the remains of a large warehouse complex believed to date back to the Nara period were discovered. This corresponded to the "Iu-Kori yamadaigo Shokura", which was written in the Izumo no Kuni Fudoki compiled during the Nara period, or the government warehouse complex for ancient Iu district. The foundations for a building with raised pillars was found in the center of the site, which measures more than 100 meters from east-to-west and 150 meters from north-to-south, and is presumed to have been the site of an administrative facility. At the east end were three 4 x 3 bay buildings arranged evenly in the north–south direction, and several similar warehouse ruins have been confirmed about 30 meters on the west. In total, the foundations of 26 buildings, 3 rows of fences, 5 ditch-like remains, and 2 earthen pits have been confirmed. A large amount of carbonized rice was also unearthed, indicating that the complex was destroyed by fire.

=== Kitashinzōin ruins ===
The Kitashinzōin ruins are located a few hundred meters away from the Shōkura ruins, and corresponds to one of the ten Shinzōin temples listed in the Izumo no Kuni Fudoki, and other ancient documents. This ruins have long been known to be the site of an ancient temple and were formerly named the Kurubi temple ruins (来美廃寺, Kurubi-haiji). Per an excavation conducted in 1996, the foundations of what is believed to be the temple's Main Hall and fragments of a large Buddhist statue were found. This temple existed from the end of the 7th century until it was abandoned due to fire at the end of the 11th century. During the archaeological excavation in 2006, the sōrin, which is finial of a Japanese pagoda was unearthed from the Kitashinzōin ruins. Most sōrin are made of copper, which quickly corrodes, so the excavated sōrin are rare in Japan. The excavated items are stored and displayed at the Fudoki no Oka Exhibition and Learning Center in Yakumo.

Currently, the Shōkura ruins are being restored and maintained as an archaeological park, so that the remains of the foundation pillars can be seen. The site if approximately 4.5 kilometers each of Higashi-Matsue Station n the JR West San'in Main Line.

== See also ==
- List of Historic Sites of Japan (Shimane)
