= Iwafune Kofun =

Ancient tomb in Yasugi, Shimane, Japan

- 岩舟古墳 (Japanese)
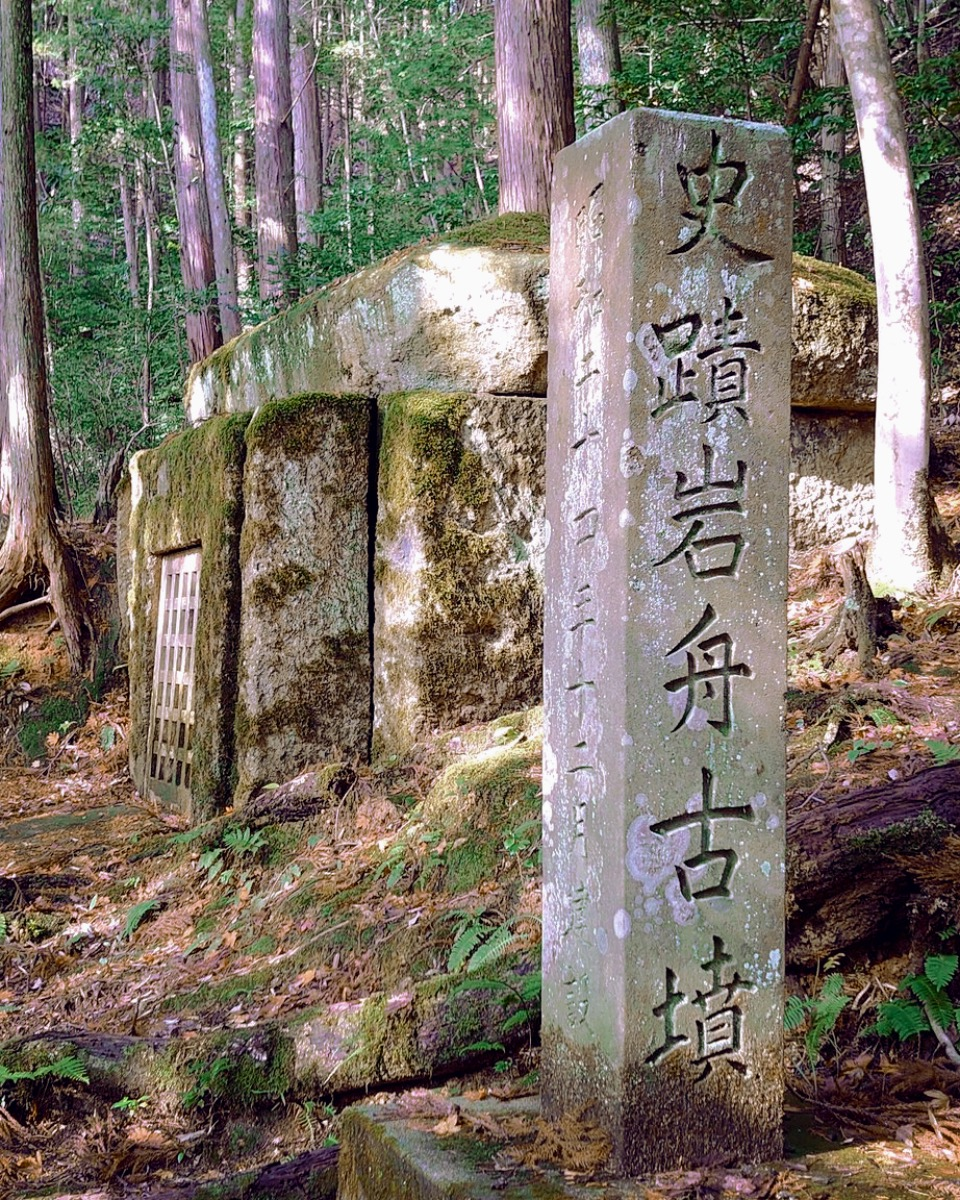
- Iwafune Kofun

- Iwafune Kofun Iwafune Kofun (Japan)
- Interactive map of Iwafune Kofun
- 35°24′00″N 133°11′25″E
- Type: Kofun
- Periods: Kofun period
- Location: Yasugi, Shimane, Japan
- Region: San'in region

History
- Built: c.5th century

Site notes
- Public access: Yes (no facilities)

Iwafune Kofun (岩舟古墳) is a Kofun period burial mound, located in the Iwafune neighborhood of the city of Yasugi, Shimane in the San'in region of Japan. The tumulus was designated a National Historic Site of Japan in 1948.

== Overview ==
The Iwafune Kofun is located on the left bank of the Iiri River, halfway up a hill. The tumulus itself is largely lost, so the original shape and type of kofun is unknown, and only the stone burial chamber remains. This burial chamber is made from cut tuff stones, and is about 2 meters long, 2.1 meters wide, and 1.7 meters high. It is believed that the burial chamber once had an antechamber, as indicated by a groove into which the side wall stones of an antechamber would have fitted, but this portion has also disappeared except for two flooring stones. The ceiling of the burial chamber is house-shaped, the side walls are made of a single monolithic stones, and the back wall is made of two stones. Inside are stone fragments from a demolished house-shaped sarcophagus. The tumulus is thought to date from the 6th century. It is located approximately five kilometers southwest of Arashima Station on the JR West San'in Main Line.

== See also ==
- List of Historic Sites of Japan (Shimane)
