= Kamienyatsukiyama Kofun =

Kofun period burial mound

- 上塩冶築山古墳 (Japanese)
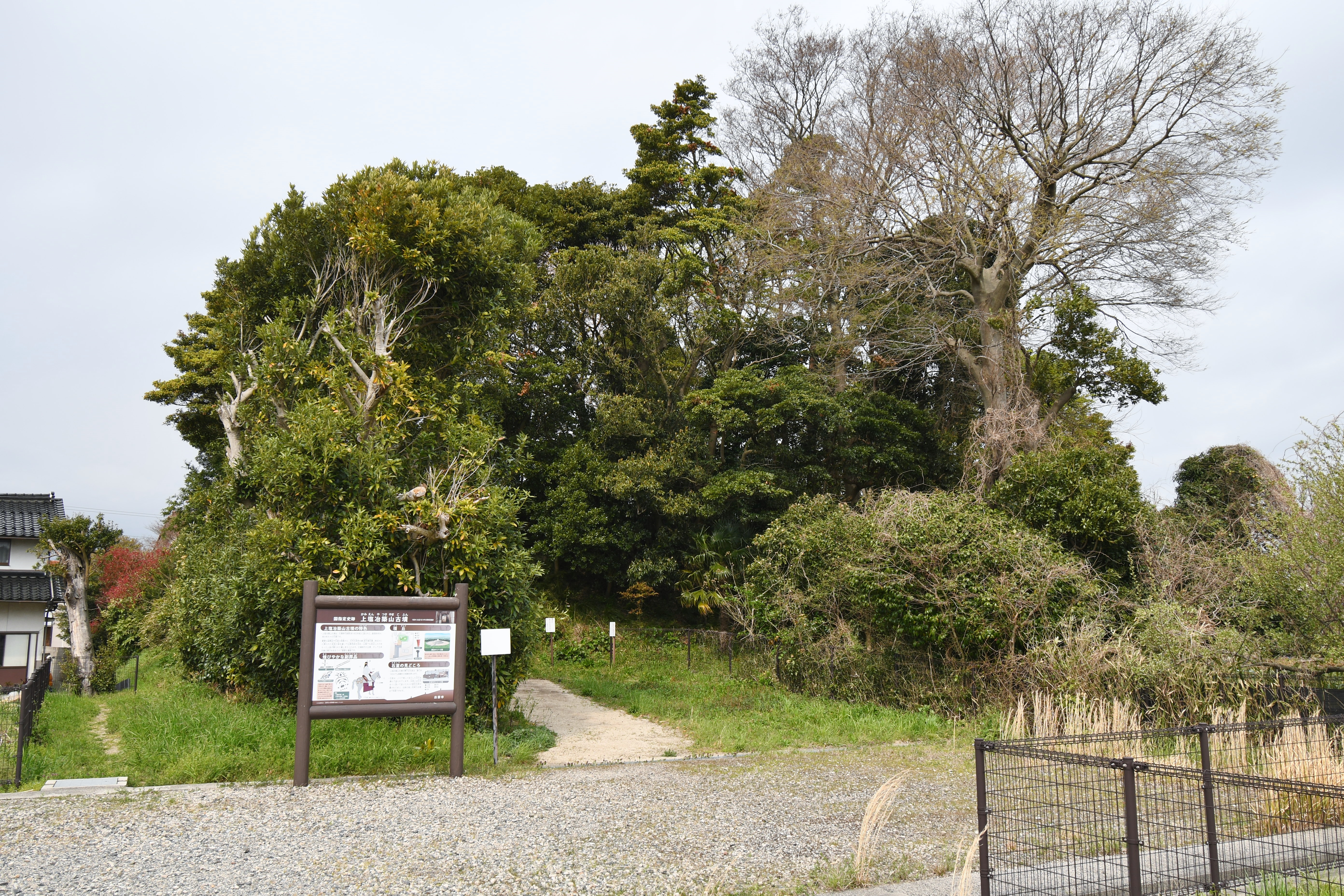
- Kamienyatsukiyama Kofun

- Kamienyatsukiyama Kofun Kamienyatsukiyama Kofun (Japan)
- Interactive map of Kamienyatsukiyama Kofun
- 35°21′0.00″N 132°45′38.40″E
- Type: Kofun
- Periods: Kofun period
- Location: Izumo, Shimane, Japan
- Region: San'in region

History
- Built: c.6th century

Site notes
- Public access: Yes (no facilities)

The Kamienyatsukiyama Kofun (上塩冶築山古墳) is a Kofun period burial mound, located in the Kamienya-cho, neighborhood of the city of Izumo, Shimane in the San'in region of Japan. The tumulus was designated a National Historic Site of Japan in 1924, with the area under protection expanded in 2020. It is one of the burial mounds that make up the Tsukiyama Kofun Cluster. The artifacts excavated from this site were collectively designated a National National Important Cultural Property in 2018.

== Overview ==
The Kamienyatsukiyama Kofun is located on slightly elevated ground on the north bank of the Kobe River in the northeastern part of Shimane Prefecture. Although the area around the tumulus has been largely leveled by the local landholder, a stone burial chamber was discovered in 1887 and grave goods were unearthed. Modern archaeological excavations were conducted since 1985. The tumulus is a circular enpun (円墳)-style kofun, with a diameter of about 46 meters and a height of about six meters, (although the British archaeologist William Gowland recorded it as being a keyhole-shaped zenpō-kōen-fun (前方後円墳) in 1907). Cylindrical haniwa and shards of Sue ware pottery have been found on the surface and surroundings. A moat (approximately 16 meters wide) surrounds the tumulus.

The burial facility is a large horizontal cut stone chamber, containing two horizontal house-shaped stone sarcophagi, one large and one small. The burial chamber is orientated to the west-southwest and has a total length (including corridor) of 14.6 meters. This is the longest in the San'in region. The chamber itself has a length of 6.6 meters, width of 2.8 meters at the back wall and height of 2.9 meters. It is constructed with cut tuff stone, with one inner wall and four-tiered side walls. Ceiling stones and lining stones are natural stones, and river stones are laid on the floor. The side walls of the corridor are three-tiered cut stone, and the ceiling stone is natural stone. Many grave goods in good preservation were found, including jade beads, a gilt-bronze crown and iron sword and daggers from the small coffin, with a horse harness placed on the lid, and a round-pommel iron sword, iron spears, iron arrowheads, silver rings and other items from the larger coffin. Many of these items were retained by the local landowner, and were acquired by Izumo city in 1959. They are now kept at the Izumo Yayoi no Mori Museum.

From these artifacts, the Kamienya Tsukiyama Tumulus is estimated to have been constructed in the late Kofun period around the end of the 6th century

The Nishidani Tombs and the Imaichi Dainenji Kofun are located nearby. The Kamienyatsukiyama Kofun is located 1.7 kilometers, or approximately five minutes by car from Izumoshi Station on the JR West San'in Main Line.

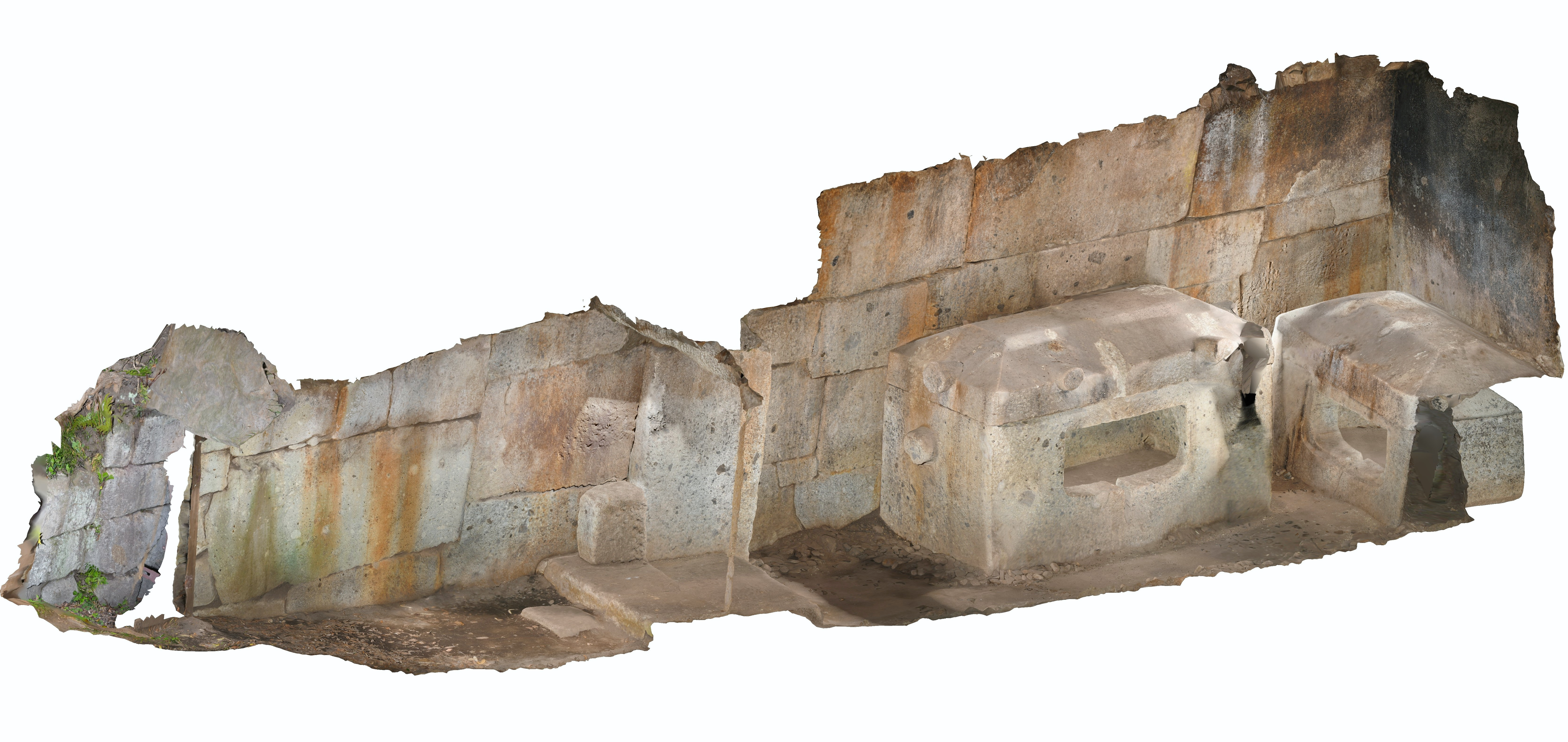
3D rendition of the burial chamber

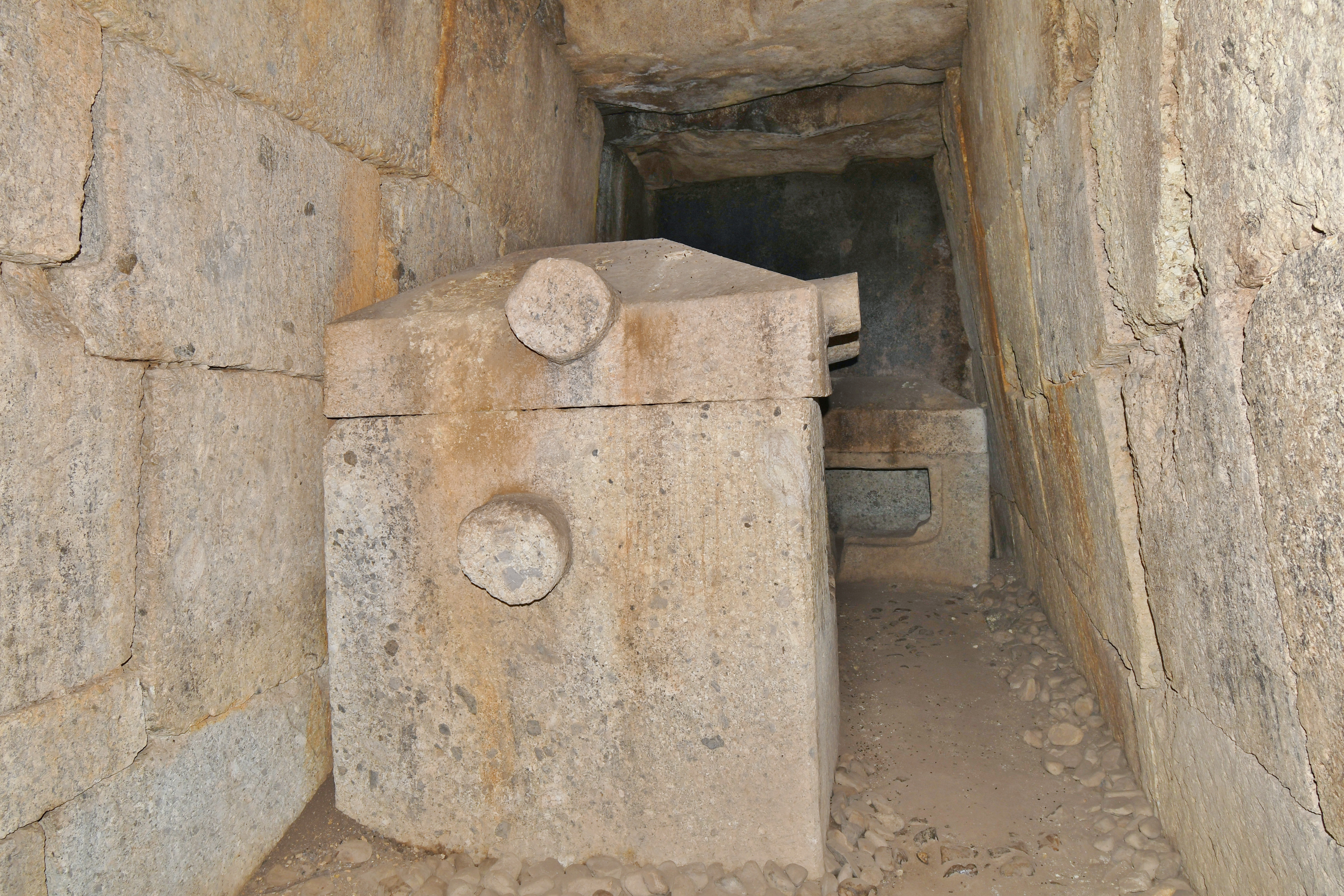
Larger Sarcophagus

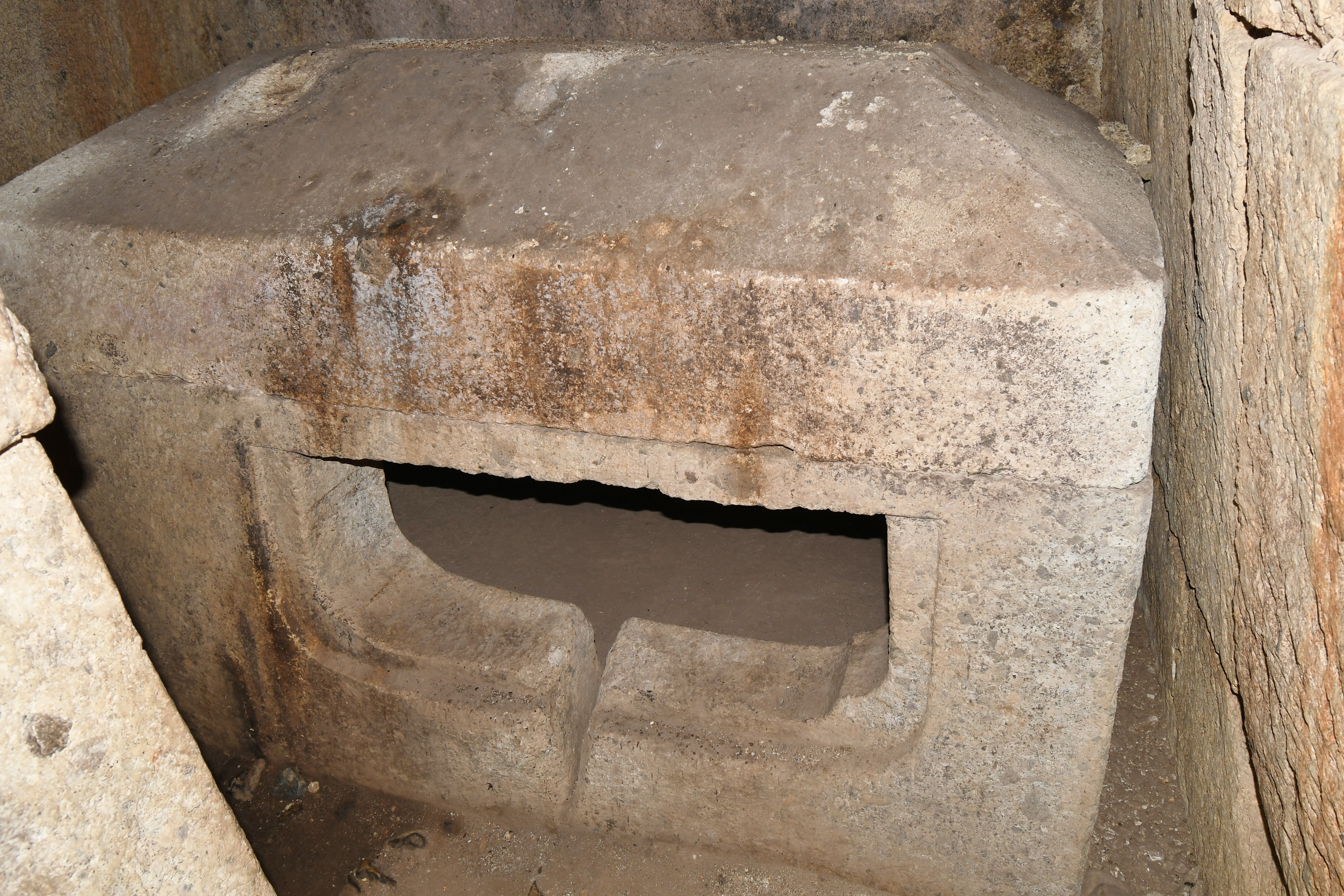
Smaller Sarcophagus

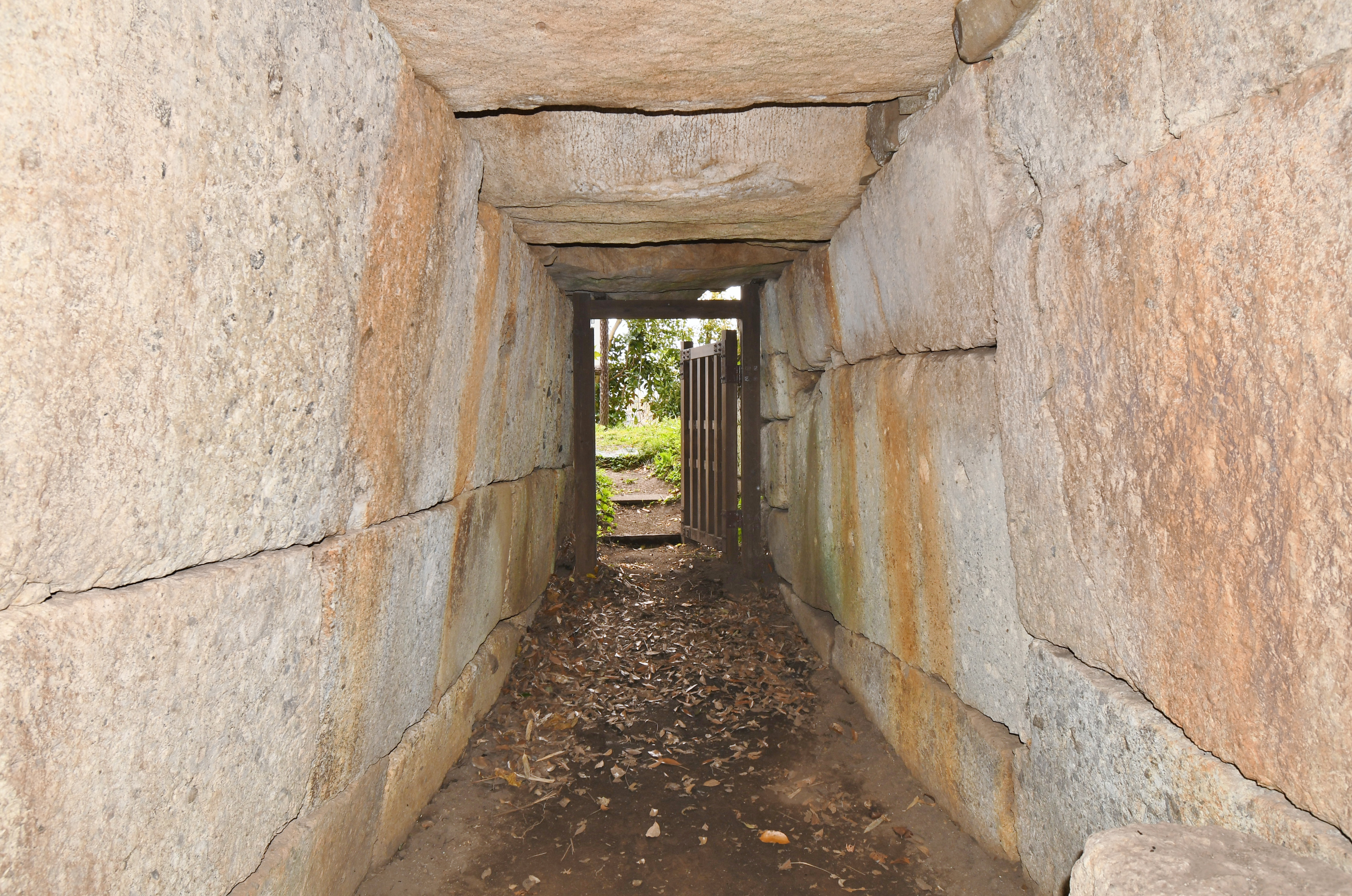
Burial Chamber looking towards entrance

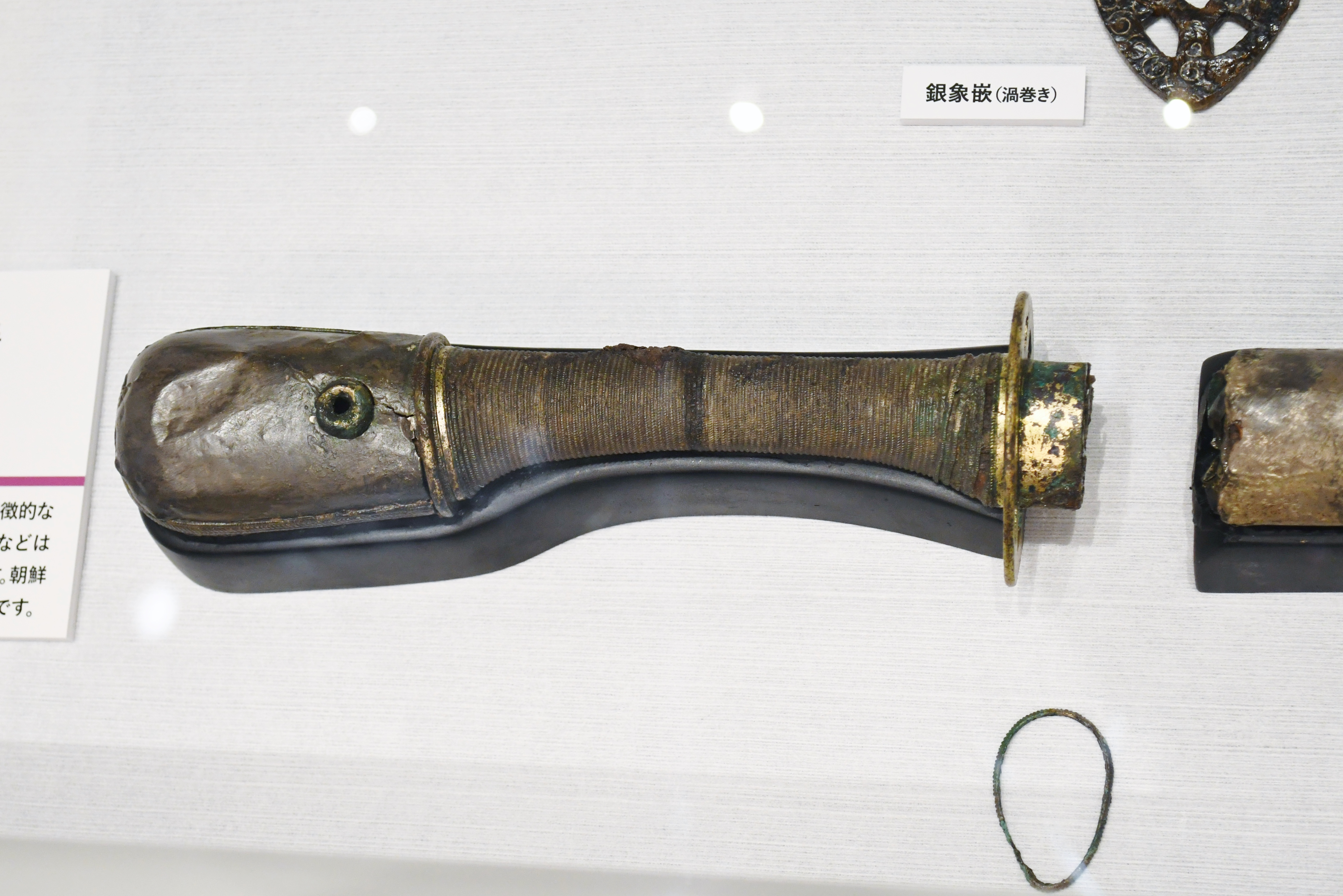
Iron Sword recovered from tomb (ICP)

== See also ==
- List of Historic Sites of Japan (Shimane)
