= Arashima Kofun Cluster =

Kofun period burial mounds in Yasugi, Japan

Arashima Kofun cluster
- 荒島古墳群 (Japanese)
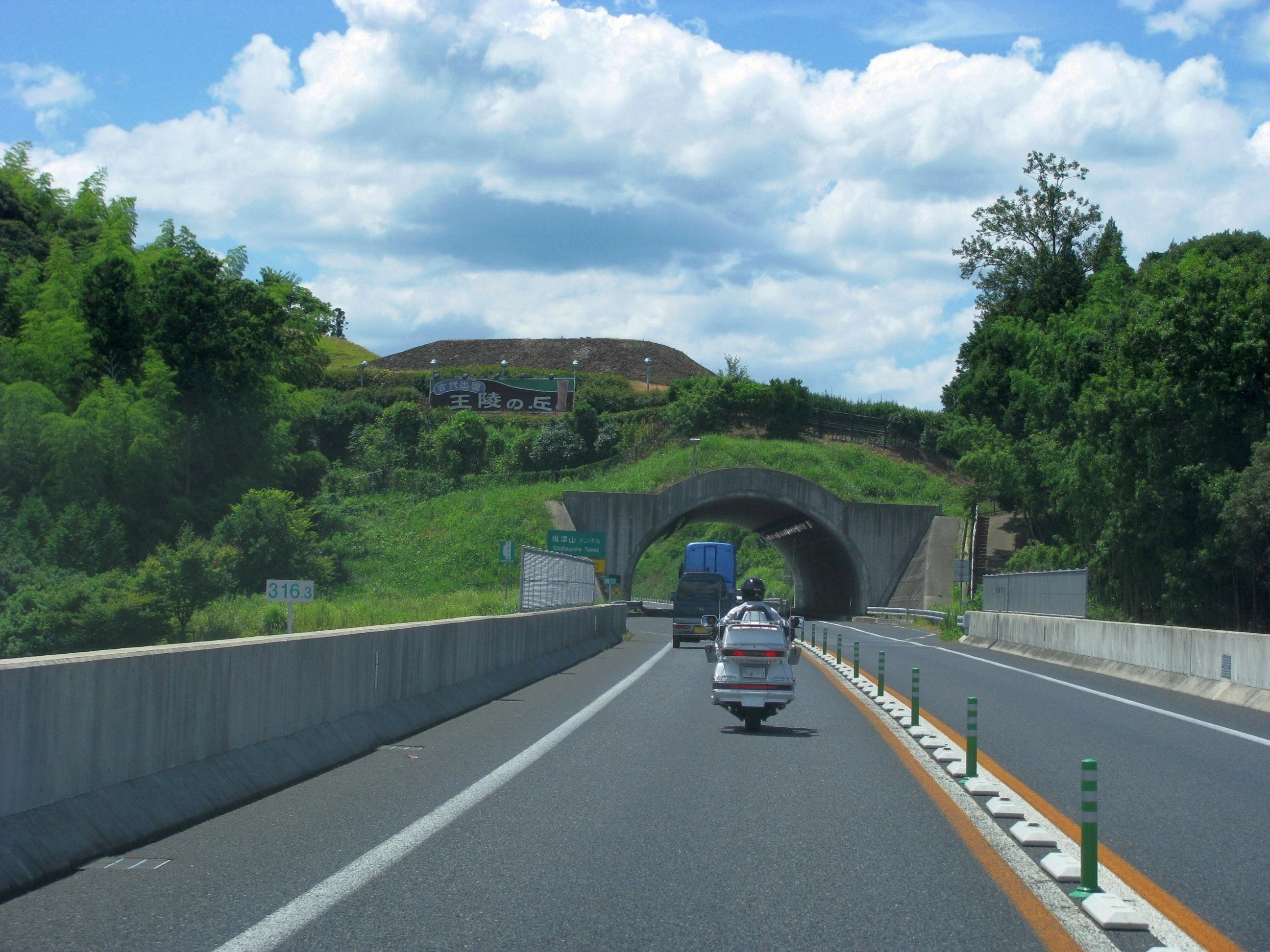
- San'in Expressway Yonago Nishi IC - Higashi Izumo IC (Yasugi Road). Above the tunnel, Kofun No. 1 of the Shiotsuyama Kofun Cluster, which was developed as the ``Ancient Izumo Royal Mausoleum Hill.

- Arashima Kofun cluster Arashima Kofun Cluster (Japan)
- 35°25′47″N 133°11′55″E
- Type: kofun
- Periods: Yayoi period to Kofun period
- Location: Yasugi, Shimane, Japan
- Region: San'in region

History
- Built: c. 4th century AD

Site notes
- Public access: No facilities
- National Historic Site of Japan

The Arashima Kofun cluster (荒島古墳群) is a group of Yayoi to Kofun period burial mounds located in the Aratori-cho and Kujira-cho neighborhood of the city of Yasugi, Shimane Prefecture in the San'in region of Japan. The tumulus group was designated a National Historic Site of Japan in 1936 with the area under protection expanded in 1999.

== Overview ==
The Arashima Kofun cluster is located on the Arashima Hills facing Nakaumi and consists of the Taisei Kofun, four of the Tsukuriyama Tumuli, and eight of the Shiotsuyama Tumuli. The Tsukuriyama Kofun No. 1 (造山古墳1号墳) is a large hōfun (方墳)-style square tumulus from the early Kofun period and was designed a National Historic Site in 1936. However, as the Arashima Hills was later found to contain a large concentration of burial mounds dating from the late Yayoi period to the Kofun period, the area was expanded in 1999 and renamed to the "Arashima Kofun Cluster" as the burial mounds were considered to be important in understanding the evolution of tumuli in the Izumo region.

The Taisei Kofun (大成古墳) was discovered during land clearing in 1911, and is also as a large rectangular tomb from the early Kofun period. The tumulus is approximately 60 meters on each side and approximately 6 meters high. From the pit-style stone burial chamber in the center of the mound, a triangular-rimmed divine beast bronze mirror, a large iron sword with a ring-shaped head, Haji ware pottery, and other items were excavated.

The Tsukuriyama tumuli to the west side consists of four burial mounds, including the aforementioned Tsukuriyama Kofun No. 1 and Tsukuriyama Kofun No. 3, which a similar large rectangular tomb. Tsukuriyama Kofun No. 1 is approximately 60 meters on a side and approximately 7 meters in height, and contained two pit-style stone burial chambers. It was excavated in 1936 and 1938, during which time a triangular-rimmed bronze mirror of divine beasts, a square-shaped bronze mirror of four gods, a spindle-shaped stone product, a glass tube bead, and iron swords were discovered. Tsukuriyama Kofun No. 3 measures 38 by 36 meters. It was excavated in 1960 and grave goods included a bronze mirror with beveled edges of two gods and two beasts, a jasper bead, a small glass bead, an iron sword, and a spear. At the highest point of the hill is Tsukuriyama Kofun No. 3, a 50-meter long "two conjoined rectangles" type (zenpō-kōhō-fun (前方後方墳)) mound, and the much smaller Tsukuriyama Kofun No., both of which were trial excavated in 1990. Tsukuriyama Kofun No. 5 is located slightly further away, and is outside the borders of the National Historic SIte.

The Shiotsuyama tumuli on the east side has eleven confirmed tumuli, with Shiotsuyama No.1 being a large Yosumi-tosshutsu-gata (四隅突出形)-style tumuli with four protruding corners from the late Yayoi period. This is a variation of the hōfun-style square tumulus with polygonal-shaped protrusions on each of its four corners. This style is unique to the Kibi, San'in and San'yō regions of Japan. During the construction of the San'in Expressway, a tunnel was constructed underneath the tumulus in order to preserve it. Shiotsuyama No. 6, and Shiotsuyama No. 10, which are rectangular tombs from the early Kofun period, still retain the remnants of the four-cornered shape, and are among the largest of this type. This group of burial mounds was not discovered until the late 1970s.

The site is approximately 15 minutes on foot from Arashima Station on the JR West San'in Main Line It is maintained by Yasugi City as a historical park: Ancient Izumo Royal Mausoleum Hill.

== See also ==
- List of Historic Sites of Japan (Shimane)
