= Iya Station =

Railway station in Matsue, Shimane Prefecture, Japan

Iya Station 揖屋駅
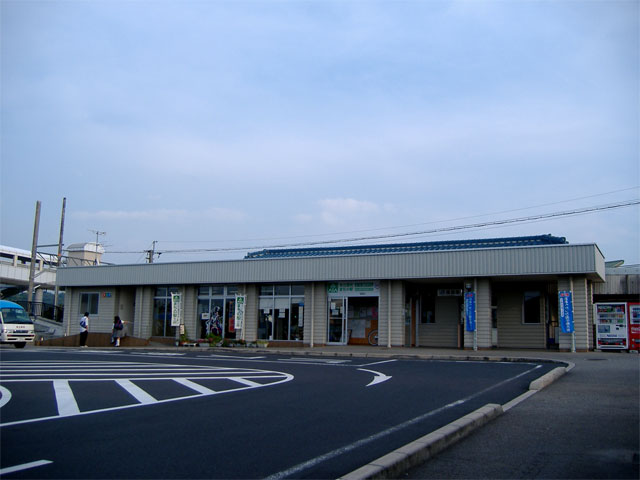
- Iya Station, September 2007

General information
- Location: 804 Higashiizumo-chō Iya, Matsue-shi, Shimane-ken 699-0624; Japan
- Coordinates: 35°25′41.2″N 133°8′57.8″E
- Owner: West Japan Railway Company
- Operator: West Japan Railway Company
- Line: D San'in Main Line
- Distance: 342.2 km (212.6 miles) from Kyoto
- Platforms: 2 side platforms
- Tracks: 2
- Connections: Bus stop

Other information
- Status: Unstaffed
- Website: Official website

History
- Opened: 8 November 1908

Passengers
- FY 2020: 626 daily (boarding only)

Services
Preceding station	JR West	Following station
Higashi-Matsue towards Masuda	San'in Line Local	Arashima towards Yonago
Location
- Location within Shimane Prefecture Location within Japan

Iya Station (揖屋駅, Iya--eki) is a passenger railway station located in the city of Matsue, Shimane Prefecture, Japan. It is operated by the West Japan Railway Company (JR West).

== Lines ==
Iya Station is served by the JR West San'in Main Line, and is located 342.2 kilometers from the terminus of the line at Kyoto.

== Station layout ==
The station consists of two opposed side platforms connected to the station building by a footbridge. The station originally had one side and one island platform, but one track has been removed. The station building is unattended.

== Platforms ==
1	■ D San'in Main Line	for Yonago and Tottori
2	■ D San'in Main Line	for Matsue, and Izumoshi

== History ==
Iya Station was opened on 8 November 1908 when the line was extended from Matsue Station to Yasugi Station on the Japan Government Railways. With the privatization of the Japan National Railway (JNR) on 1 April 1987, the station came under the aegis of the West Japan Railway Company (JR West).

== Passenger statistics ==
In fiscal 2020, the station was used by an average of 626 passengers daily.

== Surrounding area ==
- Matsue City Hall Higashi Izumo Branch
- Matsue City Higashiizumo Junior High School
- Matsue City Iya Elementary School
- Iya Shrine

== See also ==
- List of railway stations in Japan
