= Nogi Station =

Nogi Station is the name of two train stations in Japan:

- Nogi Station (Shimane) (乃木駅)
- Nogi Station (Tochigi) (野木駅)
