= Izumo Kokufu =

Izumo Kokufu ruins
- 出雲国府跡 (Japanese)
- Izumo Kokufu ruins Izumo Kokufu (Japan)
- 35°25′40.6″N 133°6′15.1″E
- Periods: Nara to Heian period
- Location: Matsue, Shimane, Japan
- Region: San'in region

History
- Built: mid 7th century AD

Site notes
- Elevation: 10 m (33 ft)
- Discovered: 1968
- Public access: Yes (park and museum)

The Izumo Kokufu (出雲国府) was the provincial capital of Izumo Province in the late Nara period though Heian period. It was located in the Okusa-cho, Yamashiro-cho, and Takeya-cho, neighborhoods of the city of Matsue, Shimane Prefecture in the San'in region of Japan. The ruins have been protected as a National Historic Site since 1971.

== History ==
In the Nara period, after the Taika Reform (645 AD) and centralization of the administration of Japan following Chinese models (the Ritsuryō system), the nation was divided into provinces, each with an official capital constructed per a uniform layout and standard, and headed by an appointed kokushi, who replaced the older Kuni no miyatsuko. With a square layout, the provincial capital mirrored the layout of Fujiwara-kyō and then Heijō-kyō, which in turn were modeled on the Tang capital Chang'an. Each had office buildings for administration, finance, police and military and the official building of the governor, as well as granaries for tax rice and other taxable produce. In the periphery there was the provincial temple (kokubun-ji), and nunnery (kokubun-niji) and the garrison. This system collapsed with the growth of feudalism in the late Heian period, and the locations of many of the provincial capitals is now lost.

== Description ==
The location of the Izumo Kokufu was known to have been in the Iu Plain from the Nara period Izumo-no-kuni Fudoki and other historical documentation, but its exact site was unknown. Over a three-year period starting in 1968, archaeological excavations were conducted in various locations to find the lost capital. The foundation of a large building corresponding to a national government structure were located on the eastern side of the precincts of a Shinto shrine, the Rokushō Jinja. Radioactive carbon dating placed the construction of this building in the late 7th century, and indicated that it had been rebuilt six times, the last of which was in the 9th century. Numerous wooden tags with inscriptions, Nara period earthenware, Wadōkaichin coins, inkstones, weights, jade jewelry, whetstones, and roof tiles were also found. One of the wooden tally strips was dated 701. The structure located in the southern half of a complex measuring 167 meters square, which was surrounded by a large moat.

The National Historic Site designation encompasses an area 218 meters square, and includes some of the surrounding paddy fields, which still are laid out in accordance with the original Ritsuryō survey dimensions. The area is part of the Yakumotatsu Fudoki no Oka archaeological park and the unearthed artifacts are preserved and displayed at the nearby Fudoki no Oka Exhibition and Learning Center. It is located approximately 4 kilometers southeast of Higashi-Matsue Station on the JR West San'in Main Line.

== See also ==
- List of Historic Sites of Japan (Shimane)
