= Rosanjin =

Japanese artist

Kitaōji Rosanjin
- 北大路 魯山人
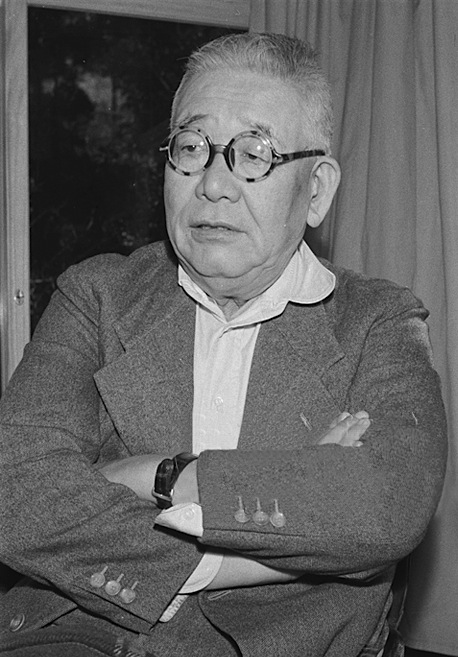
- Rosanjin in 1954
- Born: Kitaōji Fusajirō; March 23, 1883; Kyoto, Japan
- Died: December 21, 1959 (aged 76); Yokohama, Japan
- Resting place: Saihō-ji, Kyoto, Japan
- Known for: Ceramics, Calligraphy, Lacquerware, Epicure
- Awards: Order of Culture

Kitaōji Rosanjin (北大路 魯山人; March 23, 1883 – December 21, 1959) was the pseudonym for a noted artist and epicure during the early to mid-Shōwa period of Japan. His real name was Kitaōji Fusajirō (北大路 房次郎), but he is best known by his artistic name, Rosanjin. A man of many talents, Rosanjin was also a calligrapher, ceramicist, engraver, painter, lacquer artist and restaurateur.

== Biography ==
Rosanjin was born in what is now part of Kita-ku, Kyoto, as the younger son of the head priest of Kamigamo Shrine. At the age of six, he was apprenticed to (and adopted by) Fukuda Takeshi, a Kyoto woodblock engraver, after his father committed suicide on finding out that the child was not his own son. At the age of ten, while still in elementary school, he was also working at a local Chinese herbalist. In 1903, Rosanjin moved to Tokyo with the intent of studying Japanese calligraphy, winning first prize in a contest by the Japan Art Academy the following year. In 1905, he was accepted as an apprentice by noted calligrapher Okamoto Ippei, who sent him to northern China from 1908-1910 to study calligraphy and the art of Seal cutting.

In 1915, Rosanjin moved to Kyoto and Kanazawa, where he first began experimenting with decorated ceramics and developing his aesthetic theories on the relationship between food and the design of the ceramics on which it was served. In 1919, he returned to Tokyo, where he opened an art gallery and in 1920 he founded the Bishoku Club (Gourmet's Club) on the second floor of his gallery, where he began serving food on his collection of traditional ceramics. In 1925, the restaurant moved to the Nagatachō neighborhood of Tokyo, where it was renamed the Hoshigaoka-saryo.

However, the Great Tokyo earthquake of 1923 destroyed most of his ceramics collection, so Rosanjin began making pottery to replace it. In 1926, with the assistance of Toyozō Arakawa, he established a kiln in the Yamasaki neighborhood of Kamakura. Rosanjin began by imitating the classic forms of Japanese Mino, Shigaraki, Bizen and Kutani ceramics, and also for classic blue-and-white wares and colored porcelains of Ming period China. However, he often surpassed the classical forms, and became famous for his simple, but daring, original designs, at time incorporating elements of Japanese calligraphy, of which he was also an acknowledged master.

Rosanjin was also noted as a scholar of antique pottery publicizing his work in a privately published periodical, Hoshigaoka, during the 1930s.

In the post-war period, despite some financial difficulties, in 1946 Rosanjin opened a restaurant in the Ginza district of Tokyo called Kadōkadō-byō. It was patronized by the upper levels of the American occupation forces, and helped establish Ryosanjin’s reputation overseas. In 1951, noted sculptor Isamu Noguchi and his actress wife Yoshiko Ōtaka accepted an invitation to live on Rosanjin’s property in Kamakura, where they stayed for several years. Rosanjin launched a quarterly magazine, Doppo, in 1954. Also in 1954, Rosanjin accepted an invitation by the Rockefeller Foundation to hold a solo exhibition of his works in New York City at the Museum of Modern Art. He continued on to Europe, where he met with Pablo Picasso and Marc Chagall. In 1955, one of his Oribe ware works was designated an Important Cultural Property of Japan by the Japanese government. Rosanjin was designated a Living National Treasure by the Japanese government in 1959, but was one of the very few people to decline the honor.

Rosanjin died in Yokohama in 1959 of cirrhosis of the liver brought about by a liver fluke infection. His grave is at the temple of Saihō-ji in Kyoto. In 2020, the Adachi Museum of Art in Yasugi, Shimane Prefecture opened a dedicated Rosanjin Hall to house the museum's collection of about 500 works by Rosanjin.

== In popular culture ==
In the manga Oishinbo, the character Kaibara Yuzan is modeled after Rosanjin.

Kioicho Fukudaya, a ryōtei in Tokyo awarded two stars by the Michelin Guide, was established in 1939 with Rosanjin's guidance and maintains a significant collection of his service ware, seal engravings, and calligraphy.

The television series Iron Chef features the Rosanjin school of cuisine.
