= Japanese museums =

Japan was introduced to the idea of Western-style museums (hakubutsukan 博物館) as early as the Bakumatsu (幕末 ) period through Dutch studies.

== History ==
=== Before WWII ===
Upon the conclusion of the US-Japan Amity Treaty in 1858, a Japanese delegation to America observed Western-style museums first-hand.

Following the Meiji Restoration, botanist Keisuke Ito, and natural historian, Tanaka Yoshio, also wrote of the necessity of establishing museum facilities similar to the ones found in the West. Preparations commenced to construct facilities to preserve historical relics of the past.

In 1872, the Museum of the Ministry of Education (Monbusho Hakubutsukan 文部省博物館) staged Japan's first exhibition in the Yushima area of Tokyo. Minerals, fossils, animals, plants, regional crafts, and artifacts were among the articles displayed.

Following the Yushima exposition, the government set up a bureau charged with the construction of a permanent museum. The bureau proposed that in keeping with Japan's participation in the Vienna World Fair of 1873, a Home Ministry Museum (now, the Tokyo National Museum) eventually be developed.

In 1877, the Museum of Education (Kyoiku Hakubutsukan 教育博物館)opened in Ueno Park (now, the National Science Museum of Japan) with displays devoted to physics, chemistry, zoology, botany, and regional crafts. As a part of the exhibition, art objects were also displayed in an “art museum.”

The Imperial Household Department oversaw the establishment of a central museum dedicated to historical artifacts in 1886. In addition, in the years after 1877, there was great enthusiasm for establishing regional museums in Akita, Niigata, Kanazawa, Kyoto, Osaka, and Hiroshima.

In 1895, the Nara National Museum opened its doors, followed in 1897 by the Kyoto National Museum. Other national specialty museums followed: the Ministry of Agriculture and Commerce Exhibition Hall (1897), Patent Office Exhibition Hall (1905), and the Postal Museum (1902).

In 1925, the Imperial Household museum, now part of the Tokyo National Museum collection, was separated into science and historical relic departments. Separating the categories was a step towards the creation of art museum.

In addition to the national museums, private museums were also established after the turn of the century. The first private museum was the Okura Shukokan Museum, built in 1917 to house Okura Kihachiro's collection. The industrialist Ōhara Mogasaburo established the Ohara Museum of Art in 1930 in Kurashiki, Okayama Prefecture. The museum was the first Japanese museum devoted to Western art.

By 1945, there were 150 museums in Japan. However, the Great Kantō earthquake (1923), the Sino-Japanese war, and World War II, led to the stagnation of Japan's museum activities.

Japanese art objects had been collected in the Shōsōin (treasure houses) of shrines and temples from the Nara Period on. Artifacts were included in the national hakubutsukan established during the Meiji period, but were not assigned to the distinct category of art museum (bijutsukan 美術館) until after 1945.

=== After WWII ===
Plans for museums that had been put on hold during the war recommenced in the 1950s. The Kyoiku Hakubutsukan became the National Science Museum of Japan (Kokuritsu Kagaku Hakubutsukan 国立科学博物館) in 1949, and the former Monbusho Hakubutsukan became the Tokyo National Museum (Tokyo Kokuritsu Hakubutsukan 東京国立博物館) in 1952.

The government became active in art museum development in the postwar period, opening the National Museum of Modern Art, Tokyo, (Tokyo Kokuritsu Kindai Bijutsukan 東京国立博物館) which housed both Japanese and foreign art.

Private museums continued to open after the war. In 1966, the Yamatane Museum of Art and the Idemitsu Art Gallery, both built around private collections, were established.

During the 1970s, prefectural and local governmental entities began to found museums and art museums devoted to the traditional arts and crafts or commerce of their individual communities. The 1980s saw a national boom in new art museum development, with 90 new facilities constructed in 1988 alone.

Local governments were active in establishing many of these museums. In addition, museums devoted to particular industries were also founded, among them the Electric Energy Museum Denryokukan 電力館, 1984) and the Subway Museum (Chikatetsu Hakubutsukan 地下鉄博物館, 1986).

== List of Japanese museums ==
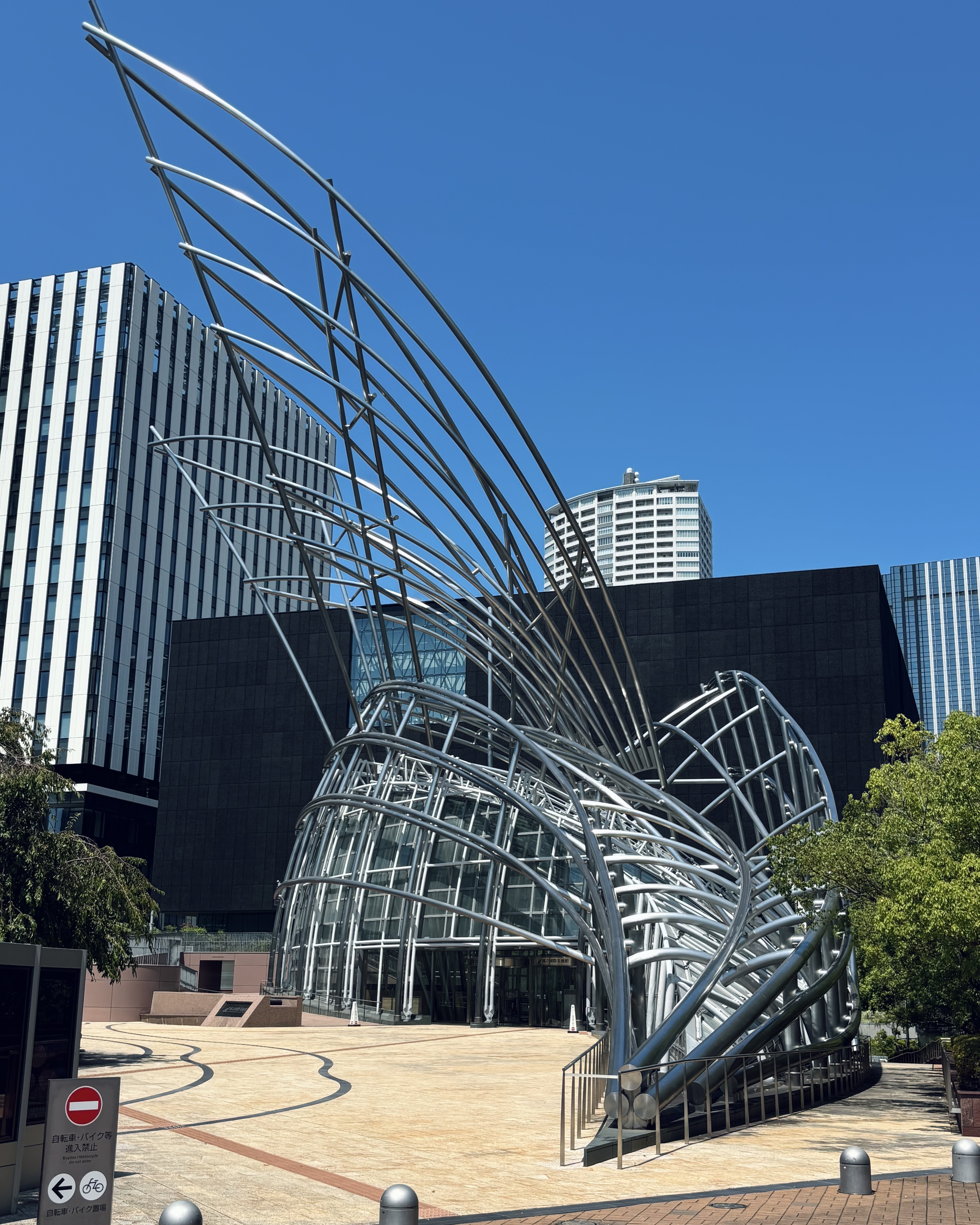
National Museum of Art, Osaka

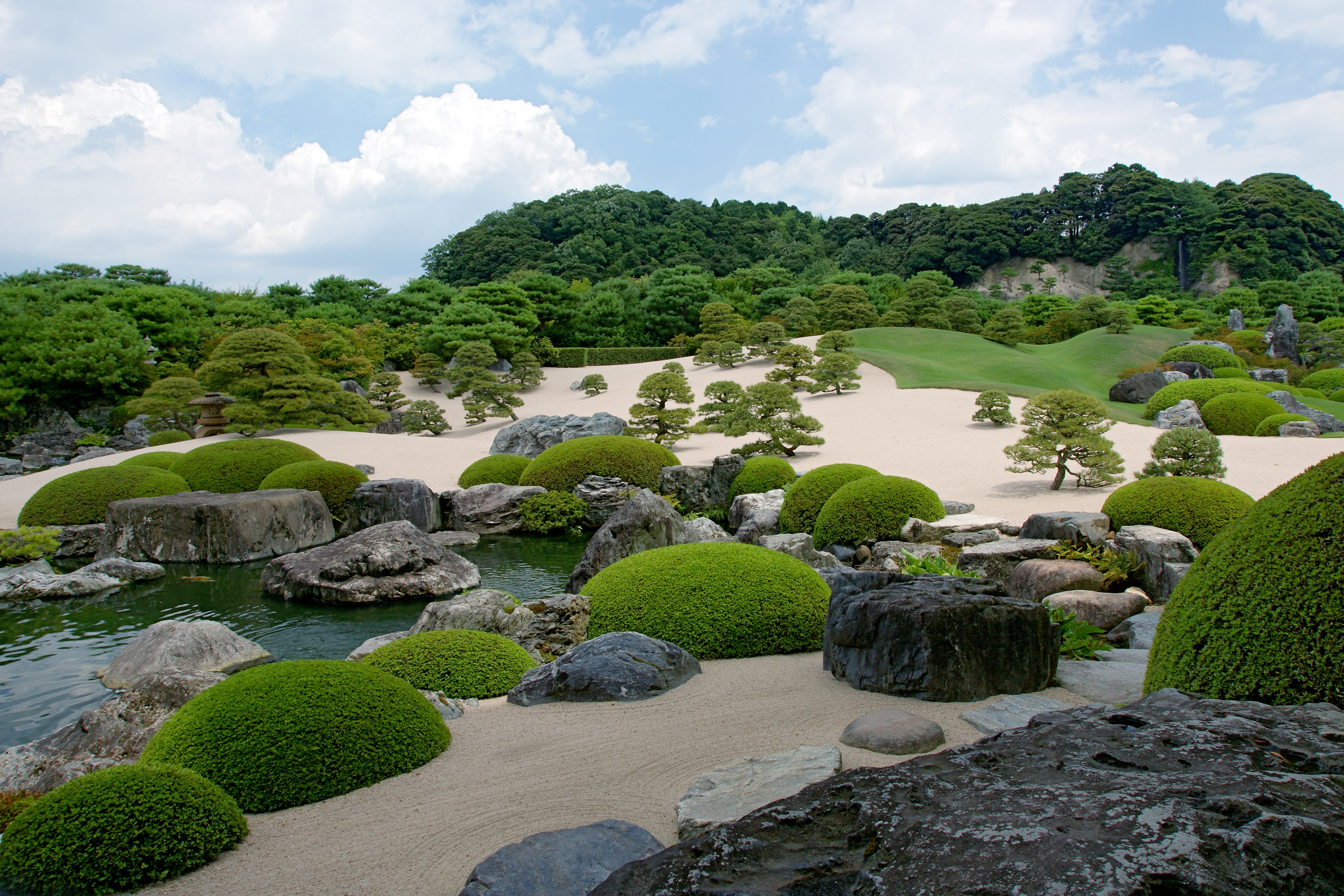
Adachi Museum of Art

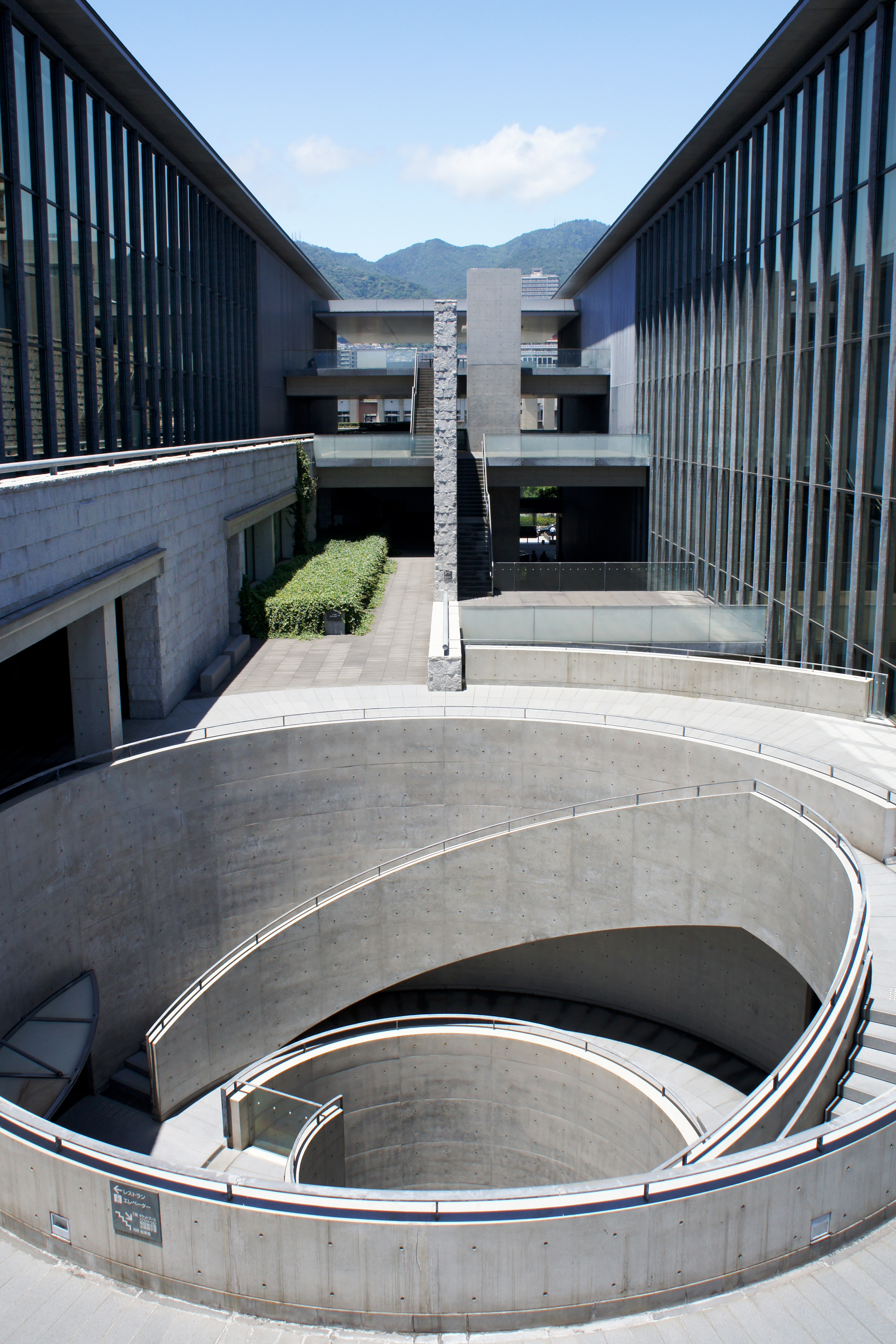
Hyōgo Prefectural Museum of Art

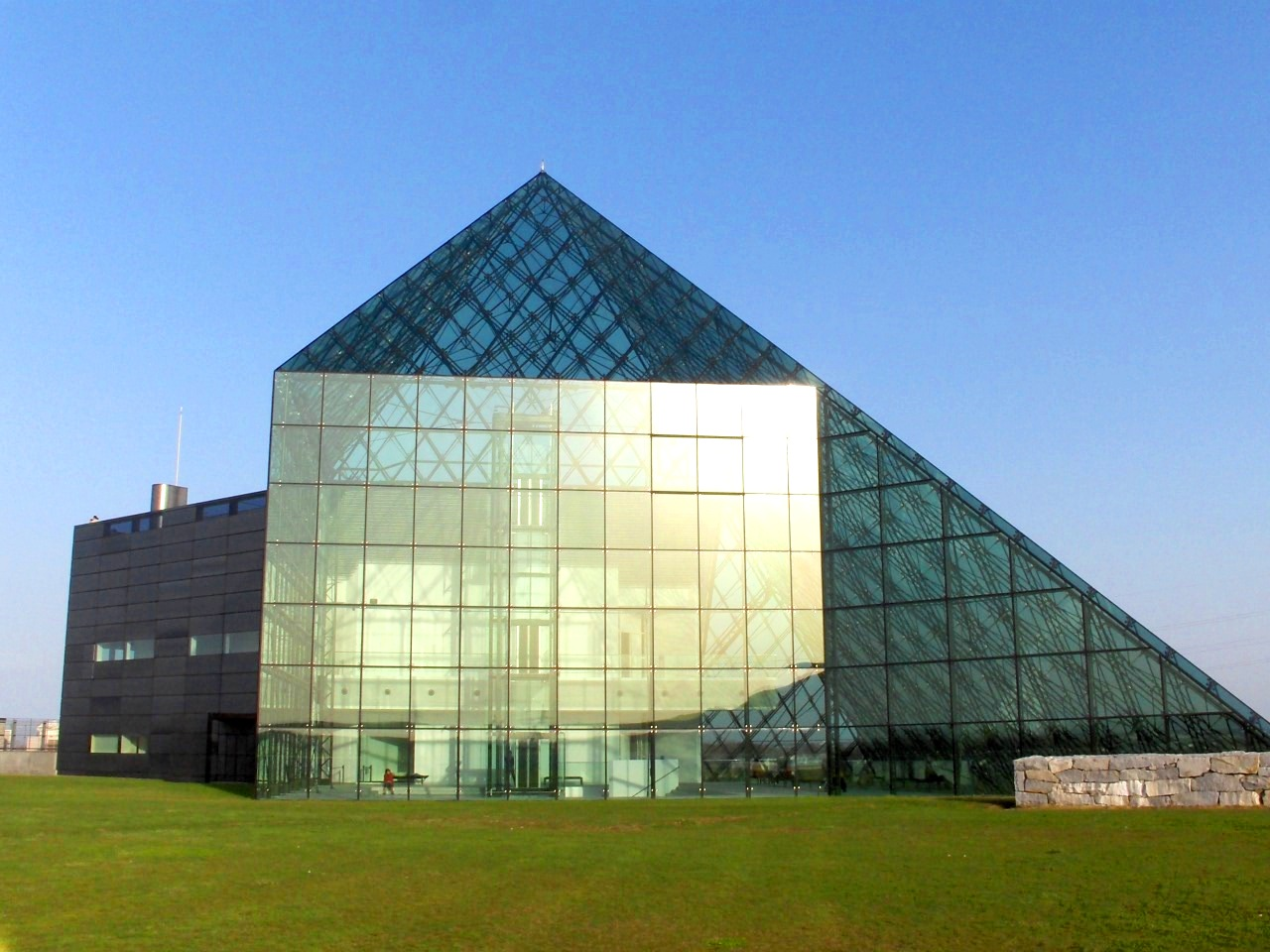
Moerenuma Park

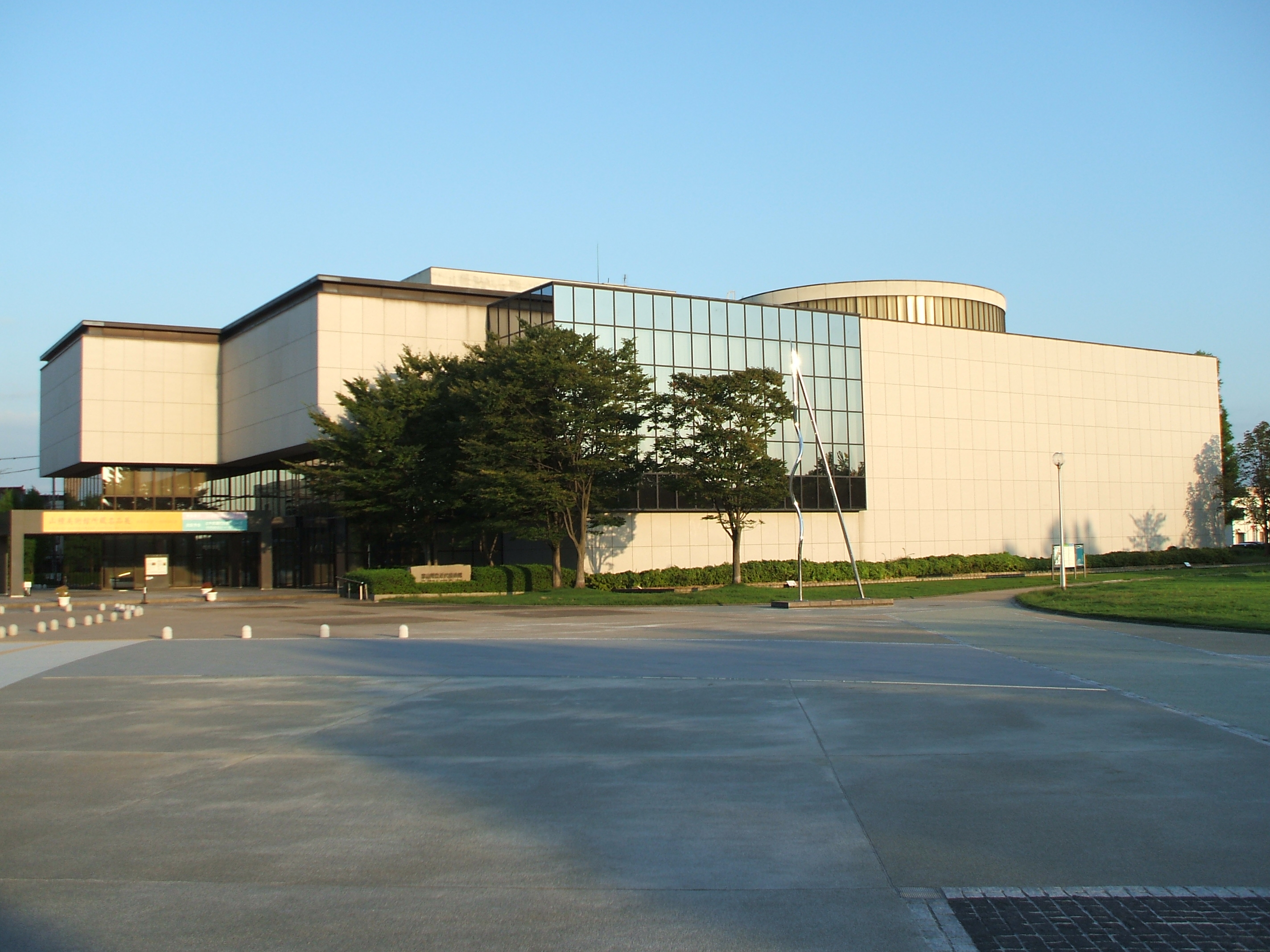
Museum of Modern Art, Toyama

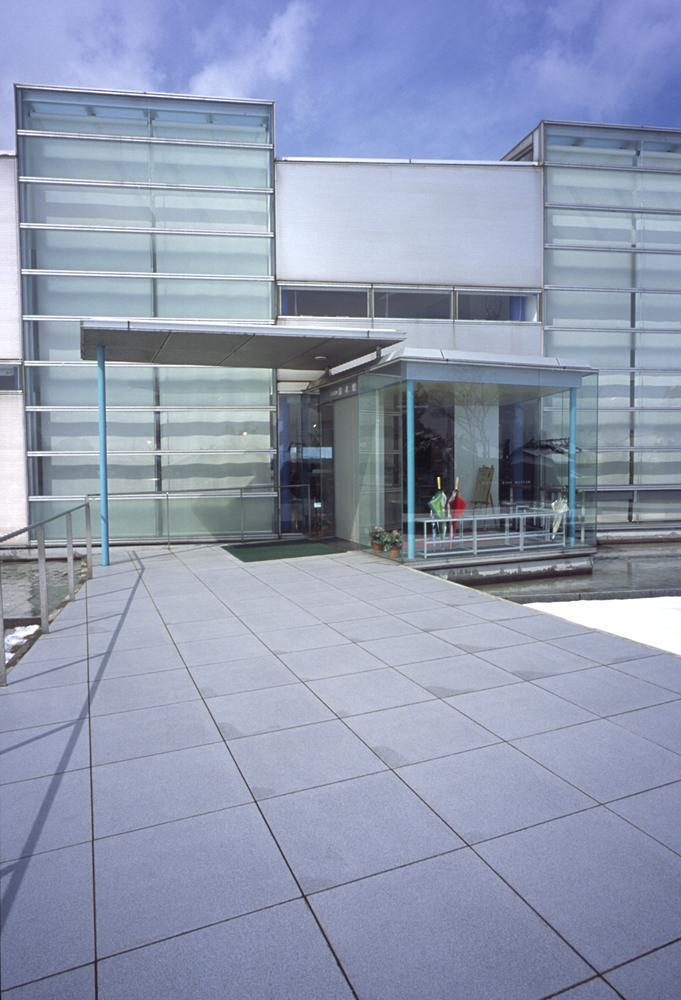
Oshima Museum of Picture Books, Imizu, Toyama.

== See also ==
- Groups of Traditional Buildings
- Prefectural museum
