= Kimachi Station =

Railway station in Matsue, Shimane Prefecture, Japan

Kimachi Station 来待駅
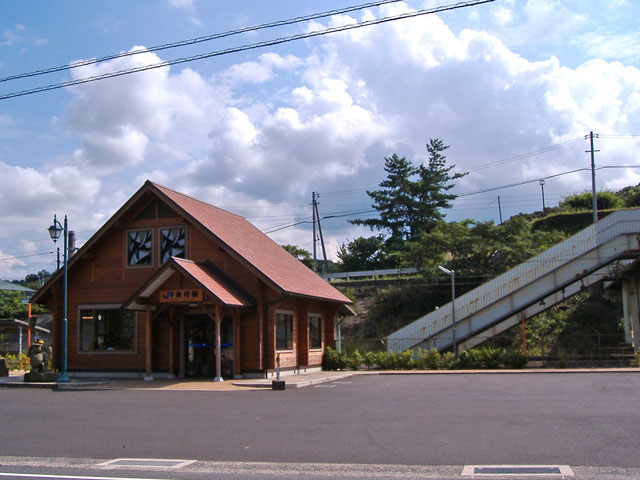
- Kimachi Station, September 2007

General information
- Location: 1053 Higashikimachi, Shinji-chō, Matsue-shi, Shimane-ken 699-0624; Japan
- Coordinates: 35°25′14.7″N 132°57′5.6″E
- Owner: West Japan Railway Company
- Operator: West Japan Railway Company
- Line: D San'in Main Line
- Distance: 364.5 km (226.5 miles) from Kyoto
- Platforms: 2 side platforms
- Tracks: 2
- Connections: Bus stop

Other information
- Status: Unstaffed
- Website: Official website

History
- Opened: 25 December 1929

Passengers
- FY 2020: 116 daily (boarding only)

Services
| Preceding station | JR West | Following station |
|---|---|---|
| Shinji towards Masuda | San'in Line | Tamatsukurionsen towards Yonago |
Location
- Location within Shimane Prefecture Location within Japan

Kimachi Station (来待駅, Kimachi-eki) is a passenger railway station located in the city of Matsue, Shimane Prefecture, Japan. It is operated by the West Japan Railway Company (JR West).

== Lines ==
Kimachi Station is served by the JR West San'in Main Line, and is located 364.5 kilometers from the terminus of the line at Kyoto. Only local trains stop at this station.

== Station layout ==
The station consists of two opposed side platforms connected to the station building by a footbridge. The station building is unattended.

== Platforms ==
| 1 | ■ D San'in Main Line | for Matsue and Yonago |
| 2 | ■ D San'in Main Line | for Izumoshi, and Hamada |

== History ==
Kimachi Station was opened on 25 December 1929. With the privatization of the Japan National Railway (JNR) on 1 April 1987, the station came under the aegis of the West Japan Railway Company (JR West).

== Passenger statistics ==
In fiscal 2020, the station was used by an average of 116 passengers daily.

== Surrounding area ==
- Japan National Route 9
- Lake Shinji

== See also ==
- List of railway stations in Japan
