= Super Matsukaze =

Japanese limited express train service

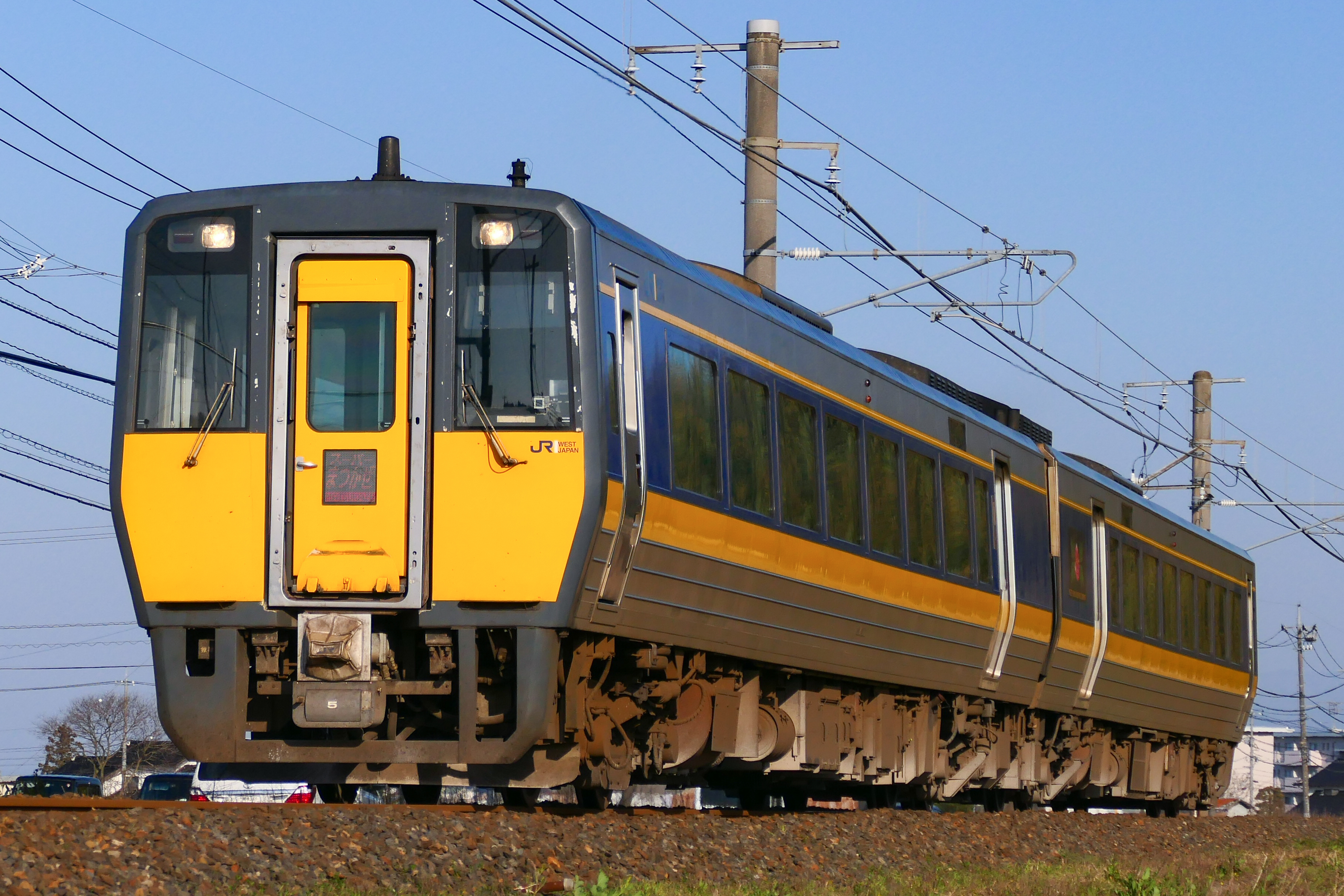
- KiHa 187 series on a Super Matsukaze service in March 2024

Overview
- Service type: Limited express
- Status: Operational
- First service: 2001
- Current operator: JR West

Route
- Termini: Tottori, Yonago; Masuda
- Stops: 19
- Distance travelled: 191.5 km (119.0 mi) (Yonago - Masuda); 284.2 km (176.6 mi) (Tottori - Masuda)
- Average journey time: 4 hours approx
- Service frequency: 7 return workings daily
- Line used: Sanin Main Line

On-board services
- Class: Standard only
- Disabled access: Yes
- Sleeping arrangements: None
- Catering facilities: None
- Observation facilities: None
- Entertainment facilities: None
- Other facilities: Toilet

Technical
- Rolling stock: KiHa 187 series DMU
- Electrification: Diesel
- Operating speed: 120 km/h (75 mph) (max)
- Track owner: JR West

The Super Matsukaze (スーパーまつかぜ) is a limited express train service in Japan operated by JR West which runs from Tottori and Yonago to Masuda.

== Stops ==
Trains stop at the following stations:

Tottori - Tottoridaigakumae - Kurayoshi - (Hōki-Daisen) - Yonago - (Yasugi) - Matsue - (Tamatsukuri-Onsen) - (Shinji) - Izumoshi - (Nishi-Izumo) - Ōdashi - (Nima) - (Yunotsu) - Gōtsu - (Hashi) - Hamada - (Miho-Misumi) - Masuda

Stations in brackets () indicate stations where not all trains stop at.
