= Hakuta, Shimane =

Dissolved municipality in Shimane prefecture, Japan

Hakuta (伯太町, Hakuta-chō) was a town located in Nogi District, Shimane Prefecture, Japan.

As of 2003, the town had an estimated population of 5,330 and a density of 55.60 persons per km^{2}. The total area was 95.87 km^{2}.

On October 1, 2004, Hakuta, along with the town of Hirose (also from Nogi District), was merged into the expanded city of Yasugi.
