= Higashi-Matsue Station (Shimane) =

Railway station in Matsue, Shimane Prefecture, Japan

Higashi-Matsue Station 東松江駅
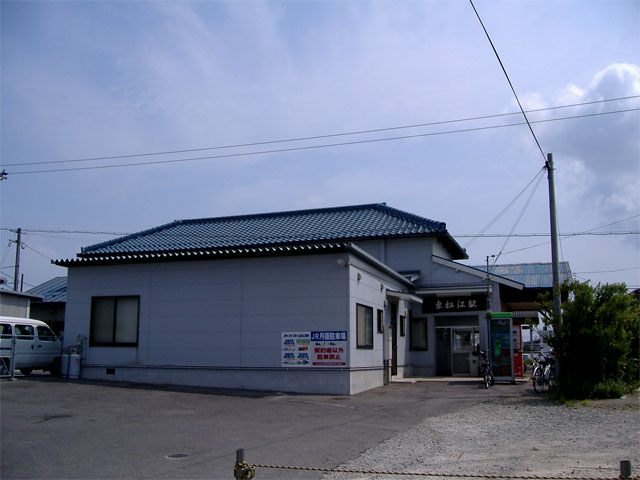
- Higashi-Matsue Station platform, 2019

General information
- Location: 821, Yawata-chō, Matsue-shi, Shimane-ken 690-0025; Japan
- Coordinates: 35°26′43.43″N 133°7′42.29″E
- Owner: West Japan Railway Company
- Operator: West Japan Railway Company
- Line: D San'in Main Line
- Distance: 345.3 km (214.6 miles) from Kyoto
- Platforms: 1 side + 1 island platform
- Tracks: 3
- Connections: Bus stop

Other information
- Status: Unstaffed
- Website: Official website

History
- Opened: 8 November 1908
- Former names: Makata (to 1973)

Passengers
- FY 2020: 69 daily (boarding only)

Services
Preceding station	JR West	Following station
Matsue towards Masuda	San'in Line Local	Iya towards Yonago
Location
- Location within Shimane Prefecture Location within Japan

Higashi-Matsue Station (東松江駅, Higashi-Matsue-eki) is a passenger railway station located in the city of Matsue, Shimane Prefecture, Japan. It is operated by the West Japan Railway Company (JR West).

== Lines ==
Higashi-Matsue Station is served by the JR West San'in Main Line, and is located 345.3 kilometers from the terminus of the line at Kyoto.

== Station layout ==
The station consists of oneside platform and one island platform. The station building is adjacent to the side platform and is connected to the island platform by a footbridge. The station building is unattended.

== Platforms ==
1	■ D San'in Main Line	for Matsue, and Izumoshi
2, 3	■ D San'in Main Line	for Yonago and Tottori

== Adjacent stations ==
West Japan Railway Company (JR West)

«	Service	»
Sanin Main Line
Sleeper Limited Express Sunrise Izumo: Does not stop at this station
Limited Express Super Oki: Does not stop at this station
Limited Express Super Matsukaze: Does not stop at this station
Iya	Rapid Commuter Liner	Matsue
Iya	Rapid Aqua Liner	Matsue
Iya	Rapid Tottori Liner	Matsue
Iya	Local	Matsue

== History ==
Higashi-Matsue Station was opened as Makata Station (馬潟駅) on 8 November 1908 when the line was extended from Matsue Station to Yasugi Station on the Japan Government Railways. The station was renamed on 1 April 1973. With the privatization of the Japan National Railway (JNR) on 1 April 1987, the station came under the aegis of the West Japan Railway Company (JR West).

== Passenger statistics ==
In fiscal 2020, the station was used by an average of 69 passengers daily.

== Surrounding area ==
- Izumo Kokubun-ji Ruins
- Hirahama Hachiman Shrine
- Matsue City Takeya Elementary School
- Japan National Route 9

== See also ==
- List of railway stations in Japan
