= Nogi District, Shimane =

Former district in Shimane prefecture, Japan

Nogi (能義郡, Nogi-gun) was a district located in Shimane Prefecture, Japan.

In 2003 the population of the district was estimated at 14,126, with a density of 47.06 persons per km^{2}. The total area was 300.19 km^{2}.

== Towns and villages ==
- Hakuta
- Hirose

== Merger ==
- On October 1, 2004 - the towns of Hakuta and Hirose were merged into the expanded city of Yasugi. Nogi District was dissolved as a result of this merger.
