= Arashima Station =

Railway station in Yasugi, Shimane Prefecture, Japan

Arashima Station 荒島駅
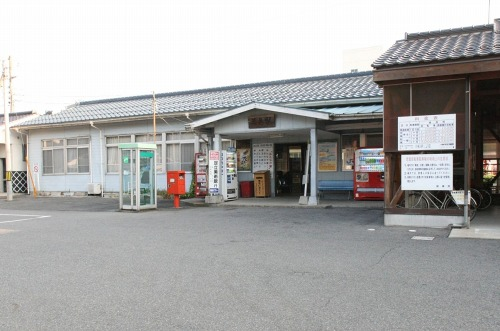
- Arashima Station, August 2007

General information
- Location: 1806, Arashima-chō, Yasugi-shi, Shimane-ken 699-0624; Japan
- Coordinates: 35°25′53.9″N 133°12′26.9″E
- Owner: West Japan Railway Company
- Operator: West Japan Railway Company
- Line: D San'in Main Line
- Distance: 336.6 km (209.2 miles) from Kyoto
- Platforms: 1 side + island platform
- Tracks: 3
- Connections: Bus stop

Other information
- Status: Unstaffed
- Website: Official website

History
- Opened: 8 November 1908

Passengers
- FY 2020: 342 daily (boarding only)

Services
| Preceding station | JR West | Following station |
|---|---|---|
| Iya towards Masuda | San'in Line Local | Yasugi towards Yonago |
Location
- Location within Shimane Prefecture Location within Japan

Arashima Station (荒島駅, Arashima-eki) is a passenger railway station located in the city of Yasugi, Shimane Prefecture, Japan. It is operated by the West Japan Railway Company (JR West).

== Lines ==
Arashima Station is served by the JR West San'in Main Line, and is located 336.6 kilometers from the terminus of the line at Kyoto.

== Station layout ==
Arashima station consists of one side platform and island platform connected by a footbridge. The station building is unattended and is located adjacent to the side platform.

== Platforms ==
| 1 | ■ D San'in Main Line | for Matsue, and Izumoshi |
| 2 | ■ D San'in Main Line | for Yonago and Tottori |
| 3 | ■ D San'in Main Line | for bidirectional traffice |

== History ==
Arashima Station was opened on 8 November 1908 when the line was extended from Matsue Station to Yasugi Station on the Japan Government Railways. With the privatization of the Japan National Railway (JNR) on 1 April 1987, the station came under the aegis of the West Japan Railway Company (JR West).

== Passenger statistics ==
In fiscal 2020, the station was used by an average of 342 passengers daily.

== Surrounding area ==
- Yasugi City Arashima Elementary School

== See also ==
- List of railway stations in Japan
