= Izumo Kokubun-ji =

Buddhist temple in Matsue, Japan

- 出雲国分寺 (Japanese)
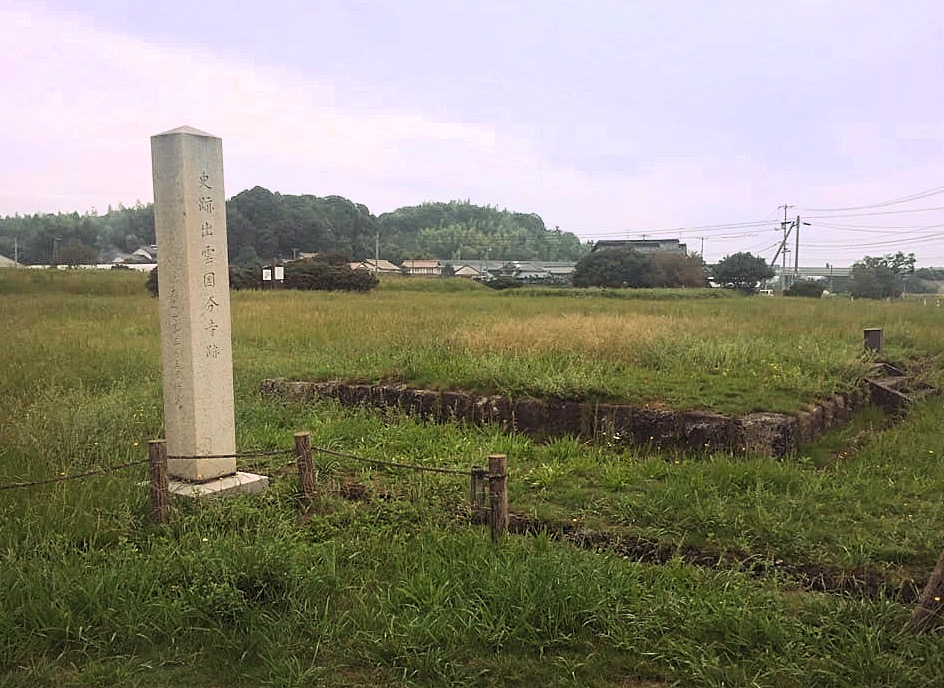
- Izumo Kokubun-ji ruins

- Location within Shimane Prefecture Location within Japan
- 35°26′19″N 133°06′38″E
- Type: Buddhist temple ruins
- Location: Matsue, Shimane, Japan

History
- Founder: Emperor Shōmu
- National Historic Site of Japan

The Izumo Kokubun-ji (出雲国分寺) was a Buddhist temple located in the Chikuya-chō neighborhood of city of Matsue, Shimane, Japan. It was one of the Nara period kokubunji National Temples established by Emperor Shōmu for the purpose of promoting Buddhism as the national religion of Japan and standardising control of the imperial rule to the provinces. The archaeological site with the ruins of the ancient temple grounds a portion of an ancient road was collectively designated as a National Historic Site in 1921.

== History ==
The Shoku Nihongi records that in 741 AD, as the country recovered from a major smallpox epidemic, Emperor Shōmu ordered that a state-subsidized monastery and nunnery be established in every province for the promotion of Buddhism and to enhance political unification per the new ritsuryō system. These were the kokubunji (国分寺). The temples were constructed per a more-or-less standardized template, and were each to be staffed by twenty clerics who would pray for the state's protection. The associated provincial nunneries (kokubunniji) were on a smaller scale, each housing ten nuns to pray for the atonement of sins. This system declined when the capital was moved from Nara to Kyoto in 794 AD.

The Izumo Kokubun-ji was located on a low hill in the northeastern part of the Ou Plain, which was the center of politics and culture in ancient Izumo Province. Archaeological excavations beginning in 1955 have found the foundation stones of a temple complex with a layout patterned after Tōdai-ji in Nara, the head temple of the kokubunji system. The layout of the temple is from the south to north, and consists of the south gate, middle gate, Main Hall, Lecture Hall, and the monastery in a straight line. There was a U-shaped cloister connecting the middle gate to the Lecture Hall, and the Main Hall, Lecture Hall, and monastery are connected by a tiled paths. A pagoda was located on the east side between the middle gate and the south gate, Extending from the South gate was a stone-paved path about six meters wide. Many of the excavated items were from the Nara and Heian periods, including roof tiles, Sue ware, and Haji ware pottery. Some of the pottery had inscriptions that read "Sai-ji," (West Temple) and it seems that this was the common name for the temple. Currently, only the east side of the pagoda is a historic park, but in the past, it boasted a vast temple area of 218m square.

Additionally, the road extending south from the Izumo Kokubun-ji ruins is an ancient road known as the "Tenpyō Kōdō", which was added to the National Historic Site designation in 1960 as it was closely related to the temple area. However, the ancient road is now under the modern road and no physical trace can now be seen. The Izumo Kokubun-ji site has been maintained as an archaeological park, and the excavated items are stored and displayed at the Fudoki no Oka Exhibition and Learning Center in Yakumo. However, only a portion of the site is covered by the park, as the temple complex covered an area 218 meters square. The site is approximately two kilometers to the west of Higashi-Matsue Station (Shimane) on the JR West San'in Main Line.

Approximately 420 meters to the east of the Izumo Kokubun-ji is the ruins of Izumo Kokubun-niji nunnery. It is possible that this temple was named "Tō-ji" (East Temple). The excavated items at this site include roof tiles similar to those at the Izumo Kokubun-ji, as well as flat tiles with calligraphy and earthenware with ink inscriptions associated with nunneries. In addition, there is a kiln site where the roof tiles used at both temple were fired at the southern foot of the low hill that borders the site of Izumo Kokubun-niji. The roof tiles are similar in design to those found in contemporary Silla temples on the Korean Peninsula. These sites are not within the National Historic Site borders.

== See also ==
- List of Historic Sites of Japan (Shimane)
- provincial temple
