= Tamatsukuri-Onsen Station =

Railway station in Matsue, Shimane Prefecture, Japan

Tamatsukuri-Onsen Station 玉造温泉駅
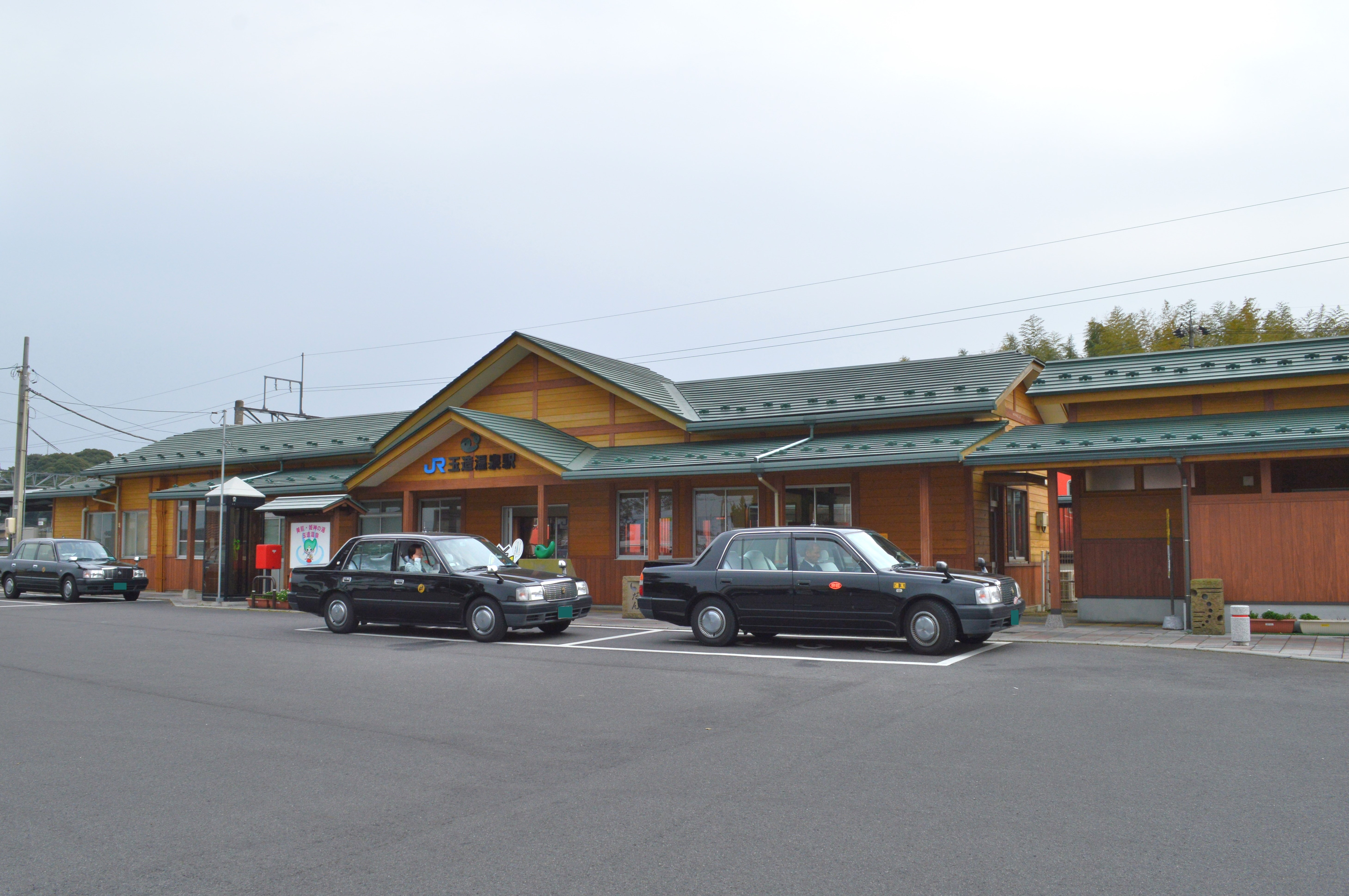
- Tamatsukuri-onsen Station in March 2016

General information
- Location: 976 Tamayu-chō Yumachi, Matsue-shi, Shimane-ken 699-0202; Japan
- Coordinates: 35°25′51.08″N 133°0′42.34″E
- Owner: West Japan Railway Company
- Operator: West Japan Railway Company
- Line: D San'in Main Line
- Distance: 358.5 km (222.8 miles) from Kyoto
- Platforms: 1 island platform
- Tracks: 2
- Connections: Bus stop

Other information
- Status: Unstaffed
- Website: Official website

History
- Opened: 7 November 1909
- Former names: Yumachi (until 1949)

Passengers
- FY 2020: 202 daily (boarding only)

Services
Preceding station	JR West	Following station
Kimachi towards Masuda	San'in Line Local	Nogi towards Yonago
Location
- Location within Shimane Prefecture Location within Japan

Tamatsukuri-Onsen Station (玉造温泉駅, Tamatsukuri-Onsen-eki) is a passenger railway station located in the city of Matsue, Shimane Prefecture, Japan. It is operated by the West Japan Railway Company (JR West).

== Lines ==
Tamatsukuri-Onsen Station is served by the JR West San'in Main Line, and is located 358.5 kilometers from the terminus of the line at Kyoto.

== Station layout ==
The station consists of one island platforms connected to the station building by an underground passage. The inbound platform (toward Yonago) is actually adjacent to the station building, but the platform is located higher than the station building and can only be reached by the underground passage. The current station building is a one-story wooden structure built in 1935 and renovated in 1988 and in 2012. The station building is unattended.

== Platforms ==
1	■ D San'in Main Line	for Matsue and Tottori
2	■ D San'in Main Line	for Izumoshi, and Hamada

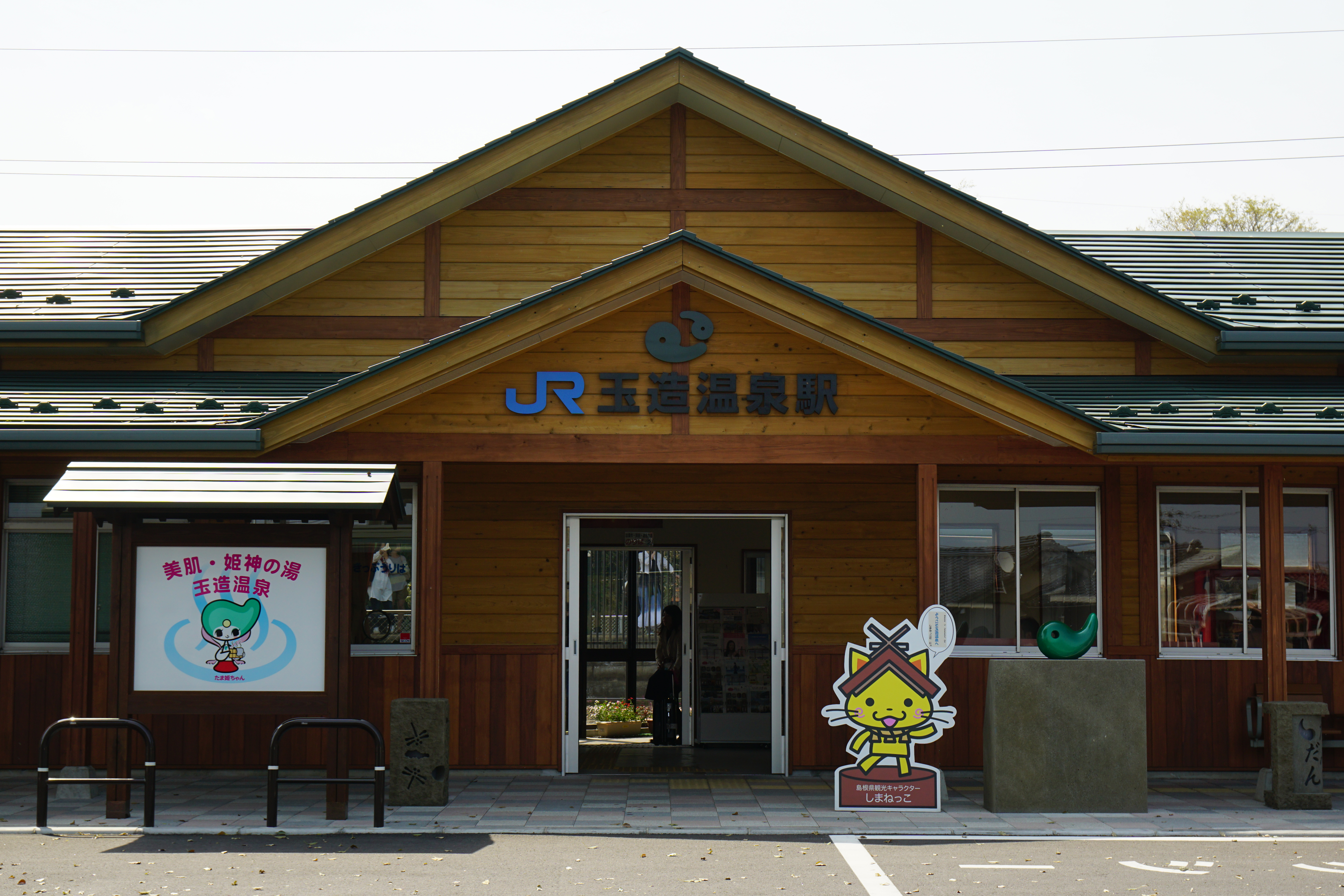
The station entrance in April 2014

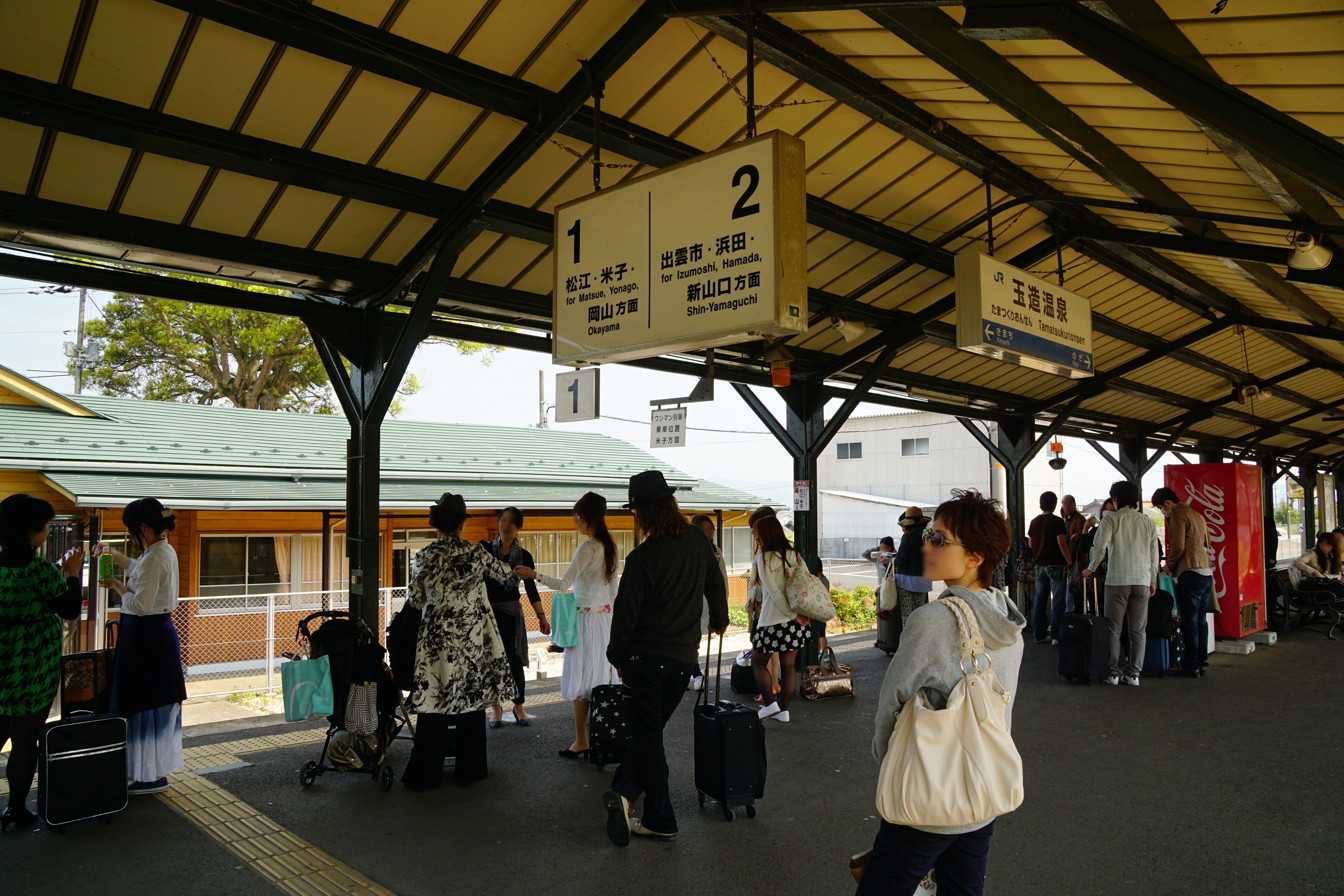
The platform in April 2014

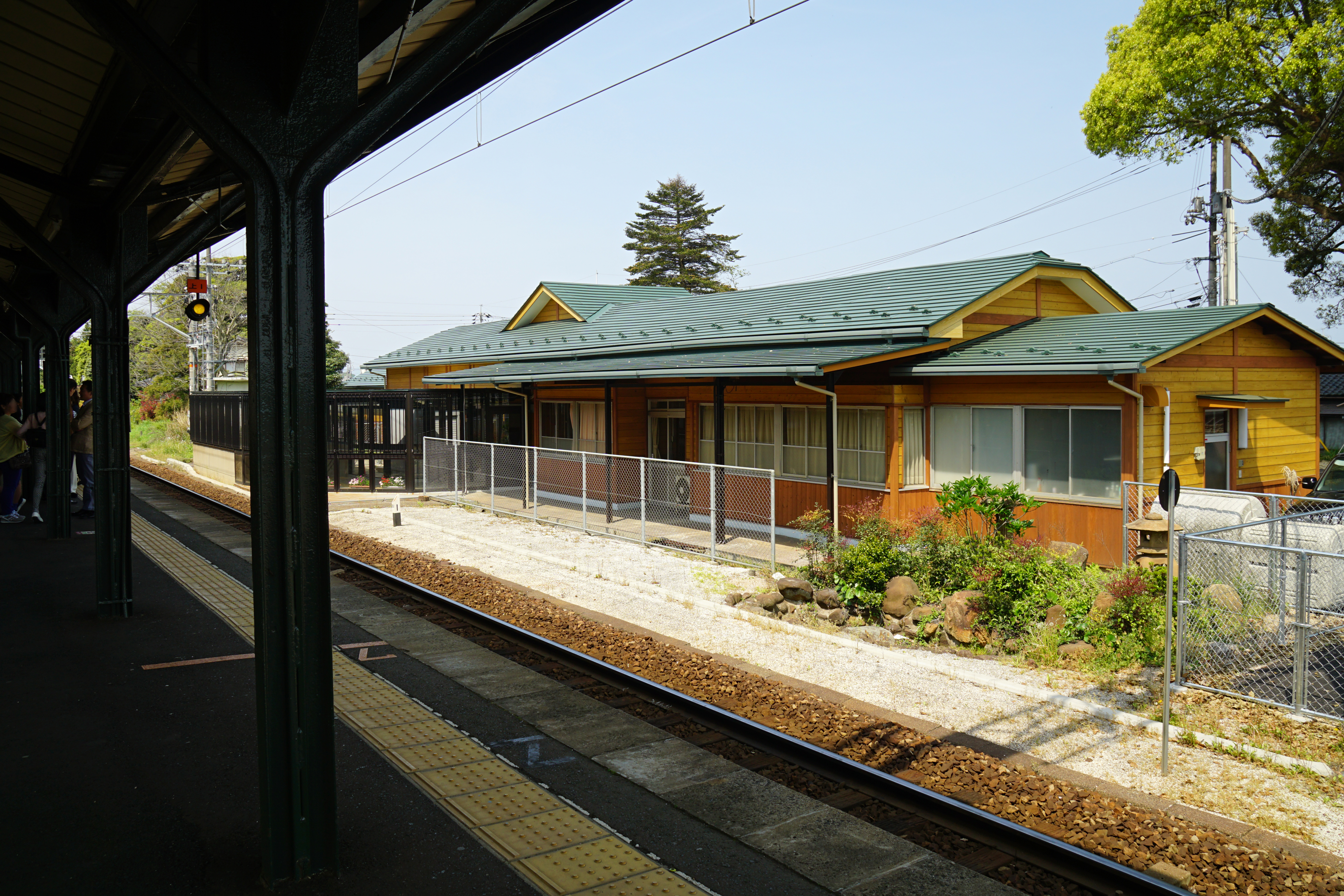
The station building viewed from the platform in April 2014

== Adjacent stations ==
«	Service	»
Sanin Main Line
Sleeper Limited Express Sunrise Izumo: Does not stop at this station
Rapid Commuter Liner: Does not stop at this station
Matsue	West Express Ginga	Shinji
Matsue	Limited Express Super Oki	Shinji or Izumoshi
Matsue	Limited Express Super Matsukaze	Shinji or Izumoshi
Nogi	Rapid Aqua Liner	Kimachi
Nogi	Rapid Tottori Liner	Kimachi
Nogi	Local	Kimachi

== History ==
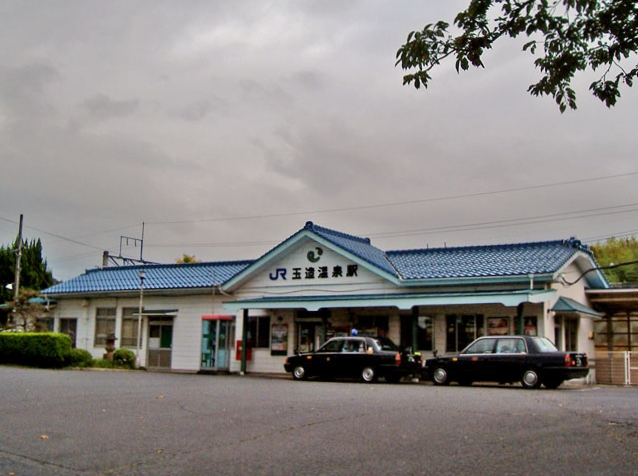
The station in September 2007, before rebuilding

Tamatsukuri-Onsen Station was opened as Yumachi Station (湯町駅) on 7 November 1909 when the line was extended from Matsue Station to Shinji Station on the Japan Government Railways. It was renamed on 11 May 1949. With the privatization of the Japan National Railway (JNR) on 1 April 1987, the station came under the aegis of the West Japan Railway Company (JR West).

== Passenger statistics ==
In fiscal 2020, the station was used by an average of 202 passengers daily.

== Surrounding area ==
The station is located in the center of the former Tamayu Town and close to the Matsue City Hall Tamayu Branch, the former Tamayu Town Hall. Tamatsukuri Onsen, the origin of the station's name, is located approximately 2 kilometers south of this station.

== See also ==
- List of railway stations in Japan
