= Hirose, Shimane =

Dissolved municipality in Shimane prefecture, Japan

Hirose (広瀬町, Hirose-machi) was a town located in Nogi District, Shimane Prefecture, Japan.

As of 2003, the town had an estimated population of 8,796 and a density of 43.05 persons per km^{2}. The total area was 204.32 km^{2}.

On October 1, 2004, Hirose, along with the town of Hakuta (also from Nogi District), was merged into the expanded city of Yasugi.
