= KiHa 187 series =

Diesel multiple unit train type operated by JR West in Japan

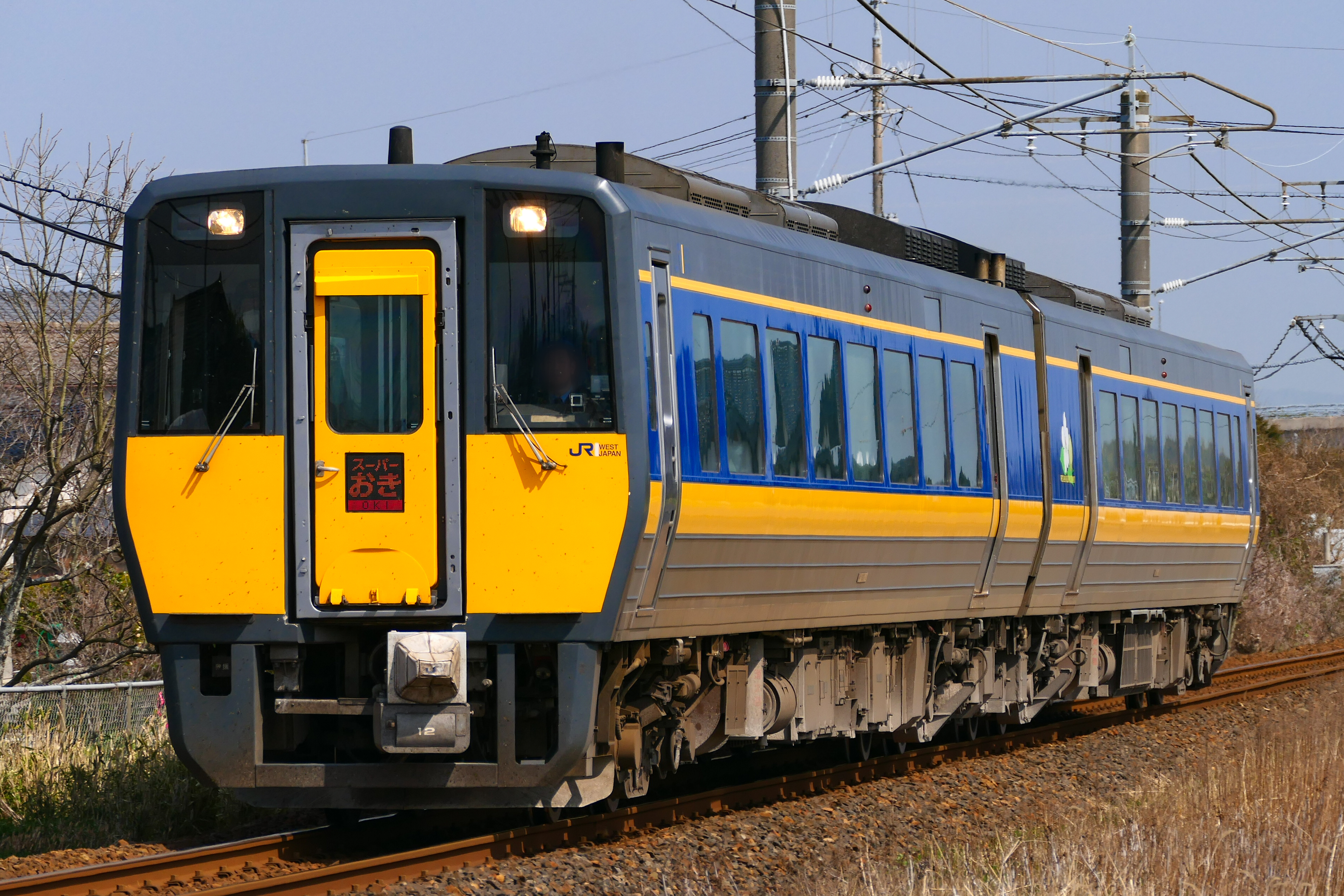
- A KiHa 187-10 series train on a Super Oki service
- In service: 2001–present
- Manufacturers: Nippon Sharyo, Niigata Tekkō
- Replaced: KiHa 181
- Constructed: 2001-2003
- Entered service: 7 July 2001
- Number built: 26 vehicles
- Number in service: 26 vehicles
- Formation: 2 cars per trainset
- Fleet numbers: 1–7, 11–12, 51–54
- Capacity: 118; 112 (KiHa 187-500 series)
- Operator: JR West
- Depot: Gotō
- Lines served: Sanin Main Line, Yamaguchi Line, Sanyō Main Line, Chizu Express Chizu Line, Inbi Line

Specifications
- Car body construction: Stainless steel
- Train length: 21,300 mm (69 ft 11 in)
- Width: 2,845 mm (9 ft 4.0 in)
- Height: 3,470 mm (11 ft 5 in)
- Doors: One per side
- Maximum speed: 120 km/h (75 mph)
- Prime mover: SA6D140H (x2 per car)
- Power output: 450 hp (at 2,100 rpm) per engine
- Transmission: Hydraulic
- Acceleration: 2.0 km/(h⋅s) (1.2 mph/s)
- Deceleration: 3.5 km/(h⋅s) (2.2 mph/s) (service); 4.2 km/(h⋅s) (2.6 mph/s) (emergency)
- Bogies: WDT61; WDT61A (KiHa 187-10/500 series)
- Braking systems: Engine brake, electronically controlled pneumatic brakes
- Safety systems: ATS-SW; ATS-P (KiHa 187-500 series)
- Track gauge: 1,067 mm (3 ft 6 in)

The KiHa 187 series (Japanese: キハ187系, romanized: Kiha-187-kei) is a tilting diesel multiple unit (DMU) train type operated by West Japan Railway Company (JR-West) on Super Oki, Super Matsukaze and Super Inaba limited express services.

The "KiHa" designation derives from the classification system used by JNR. "Ki" indicates a diesel-powered vehicle, while "Ha" indicates an ordinary passenger car, as opposed to a green car.

== Operations ==
KiHa 187-0/10 series

- Super Oki
- Super Matsukaze

KiHa 187-500 series

- Super Inaba

== Formation ==
Each set consists of two cars.

Car No.	1	2
Designation	Mc2	Mc1
Numbering	KiHa 187-1000/1010	KiHa 187-0/10
Seating capacity	60	58
Designation	Mc3	Mc1'
Numbering	KiHa 187-1500	KiHa 187-500
Seating capacity	56	56

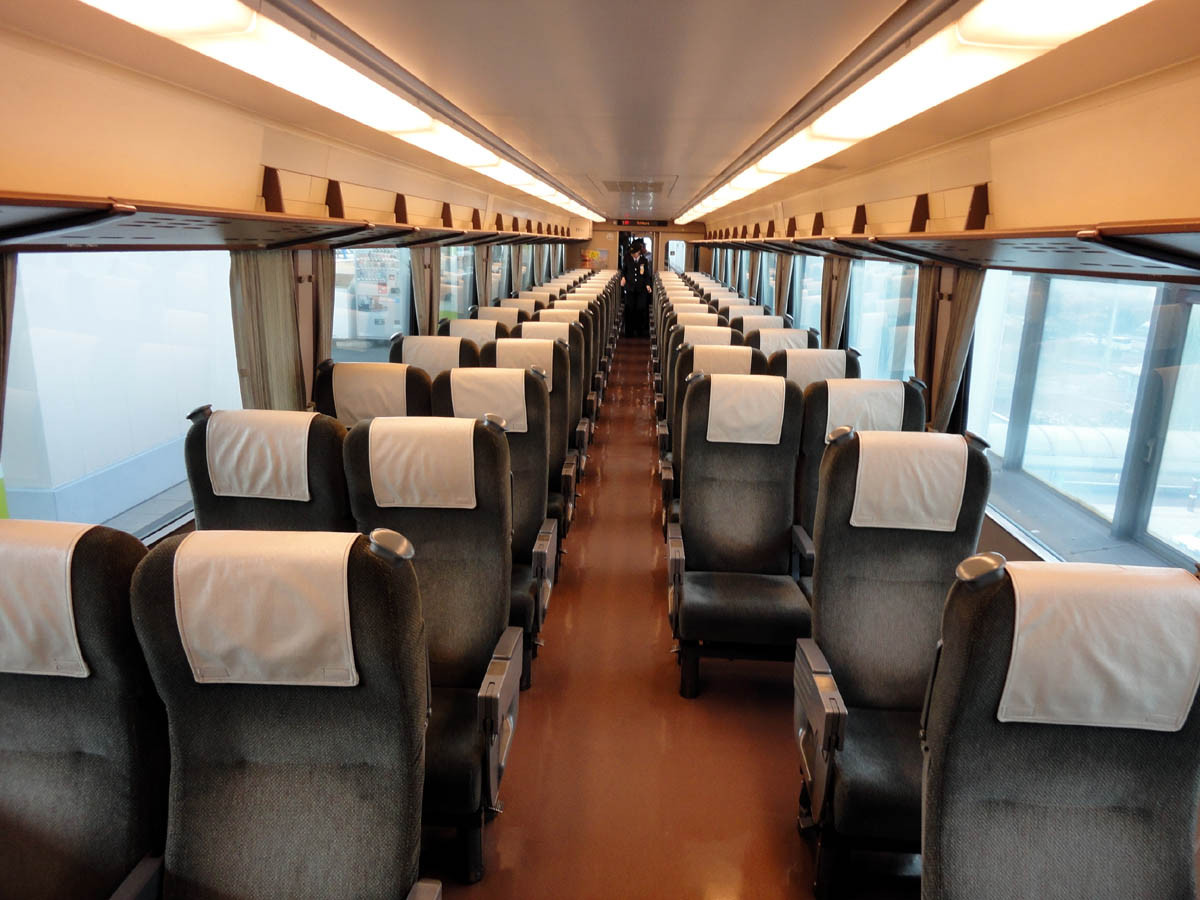
Interior
