= Adachi Museum of Art =

Modern Japanese art museum in Yasugi, Shimane Prefecture, Japan

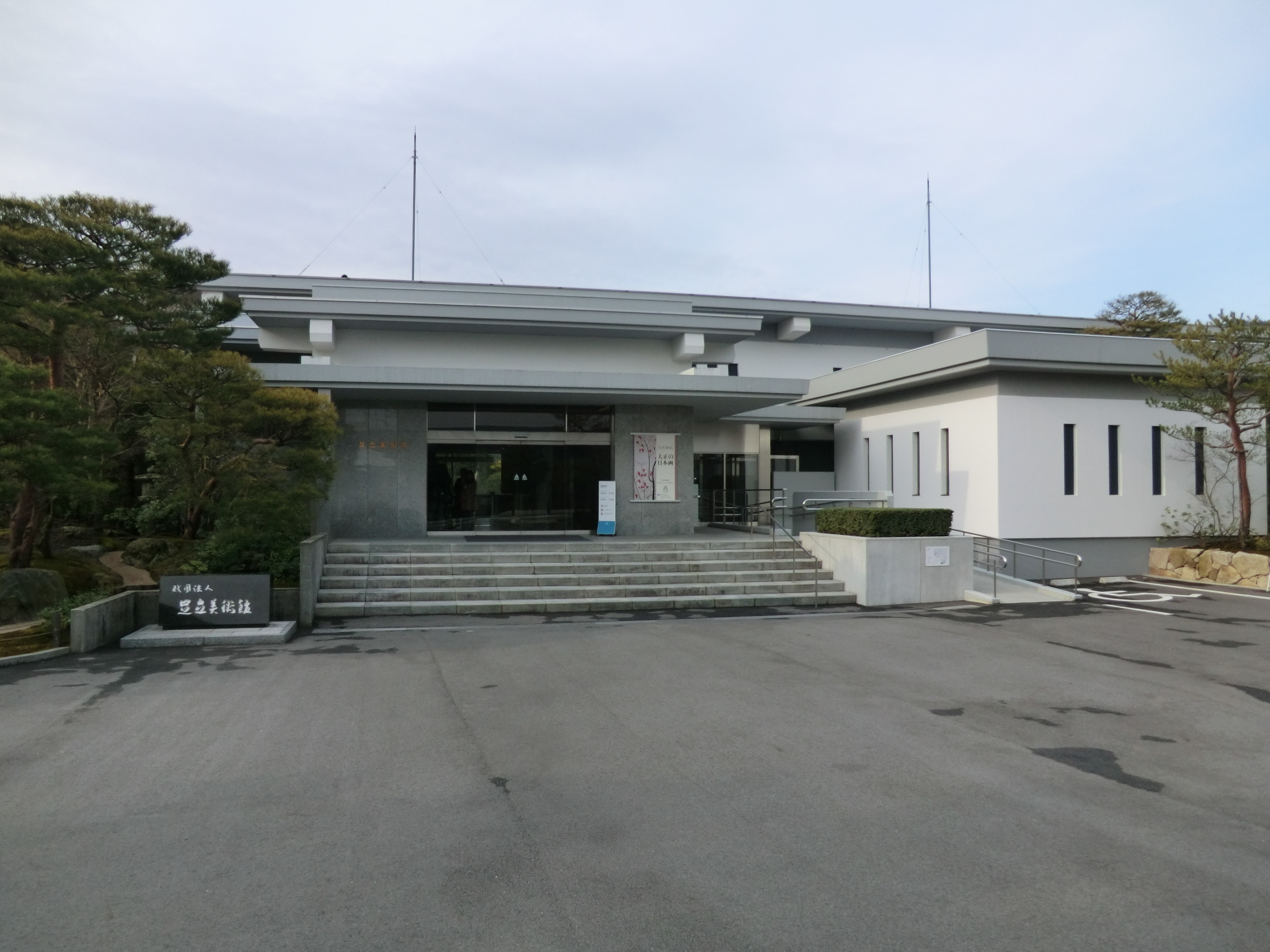
- Entrance
- Interactive fullscreen map
- Location: Yasugi, Shimane Prefecture, Japan
- Coordinates: 35°22′48″N 133°11′39″E
- Type: modern Japanese art

The Adachi Museum of Art (足立美術館, Adachi Bijutsukan) opened in Yasugi, Shimane Prefecture, Japan in 1970. It houses a collection of nihonga (modern Japanese paintings), including paintings by Yokoyama Taikan, and has a celebrated garden.

Its six gardens and around 1,500 exhibits of Japanese paintings, pottery, and other works of art occupy the 165,000 square-meter area. Adachi Museum of Art earned the top rating of three stars in Michelin Green Guide Japan because of its elegance.

In April 2020, the museum opened a separate hall dedicated to the works of Kitaoji Rosanjin.

== Gallery ==
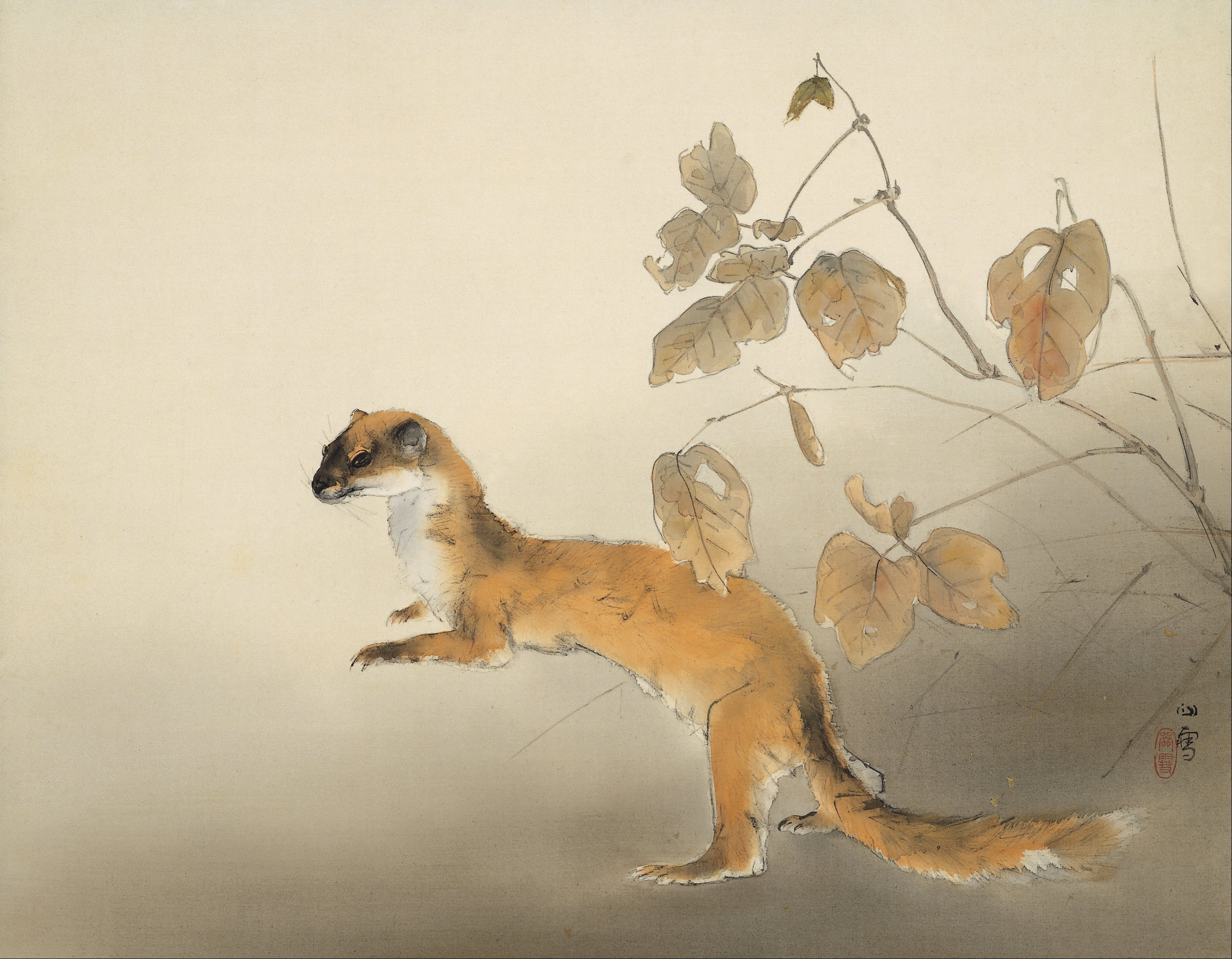
Hashimoto Kansetsu

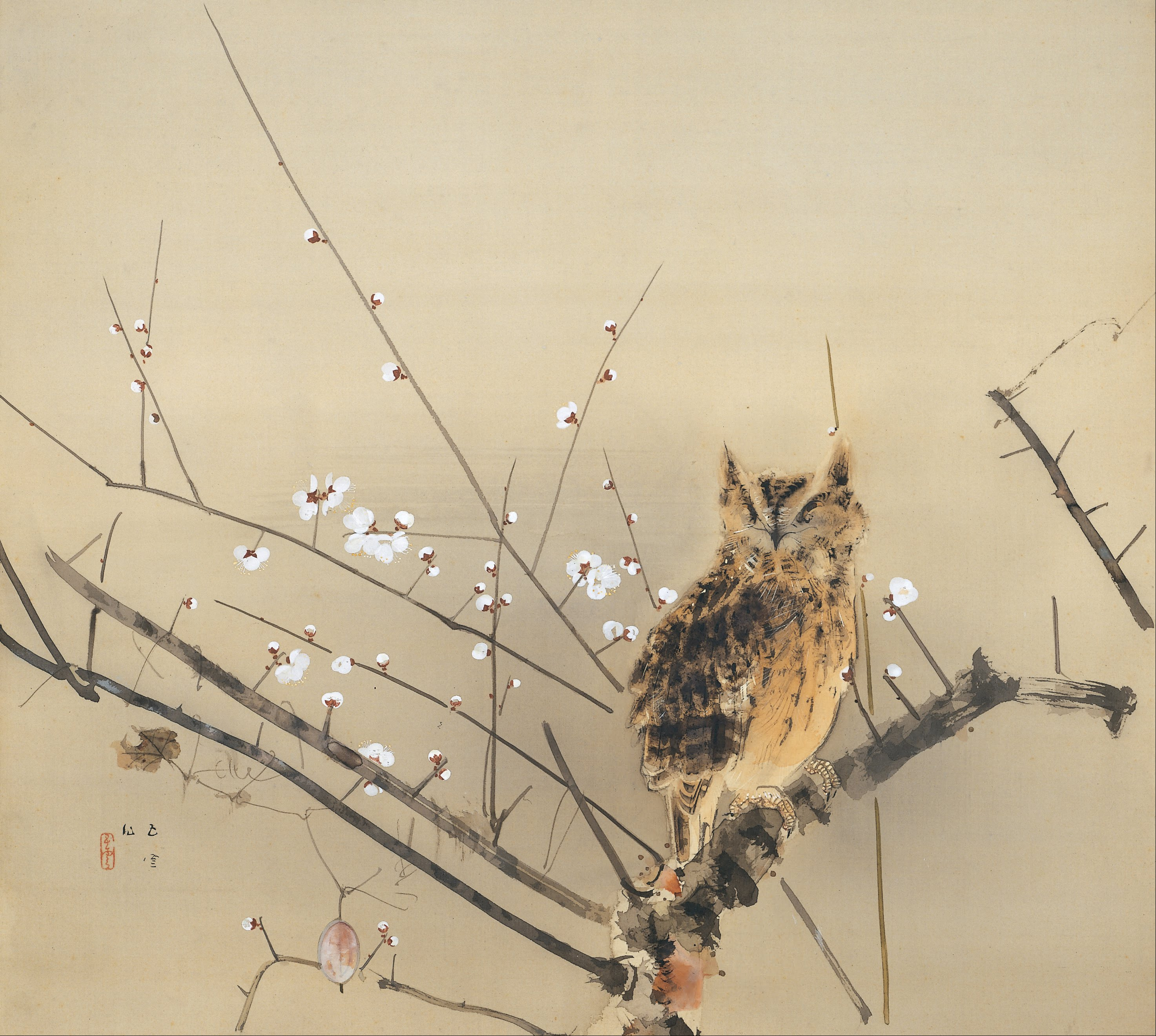
Nishimura Goun

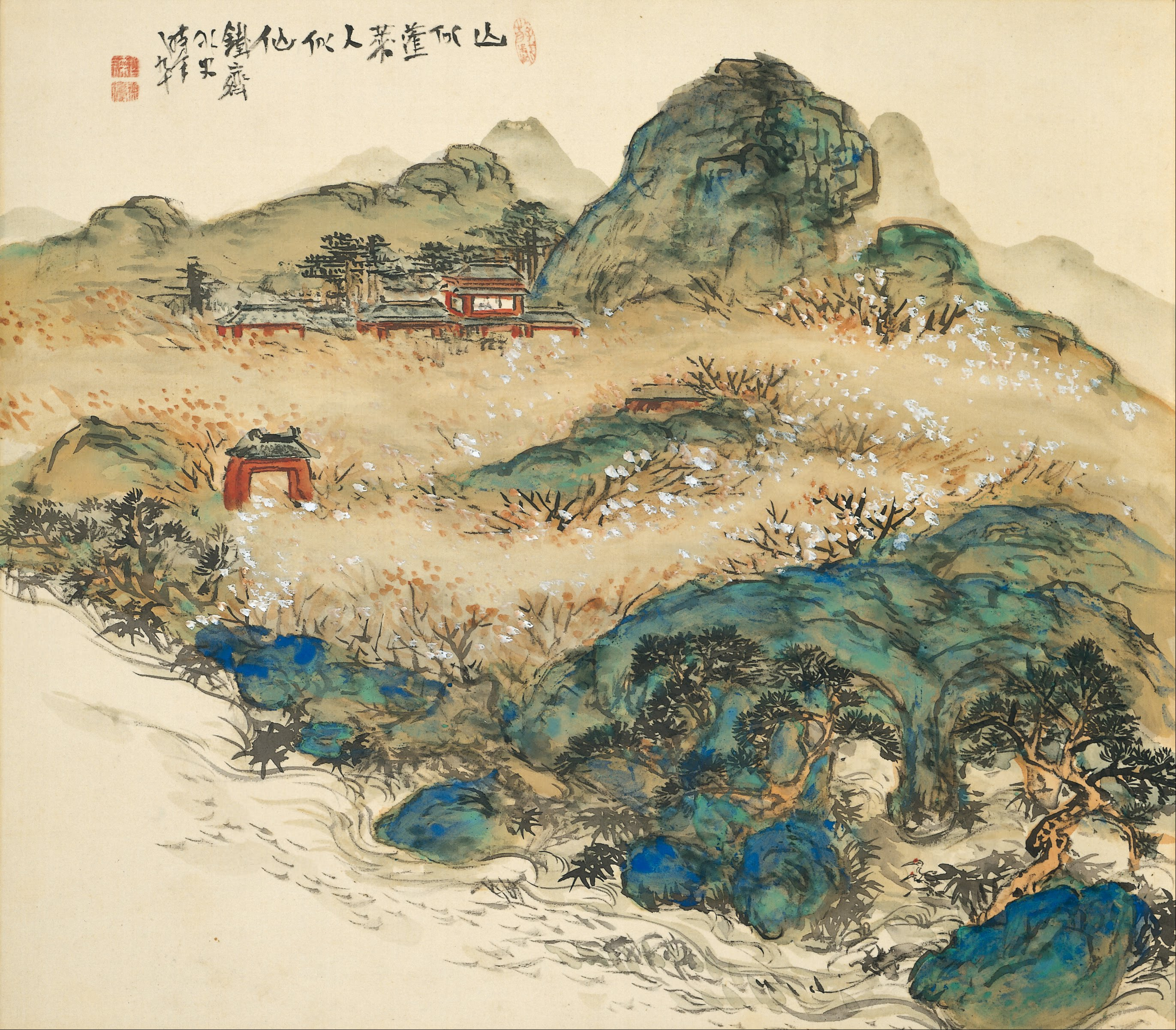
Tomioka Tessai

== See also ==
- Japanese gardens
