= Nogi Station (Shimane) =

Railway station in Matsue, Shimane Prefecture, Japan

Nogi Station 乃木駅
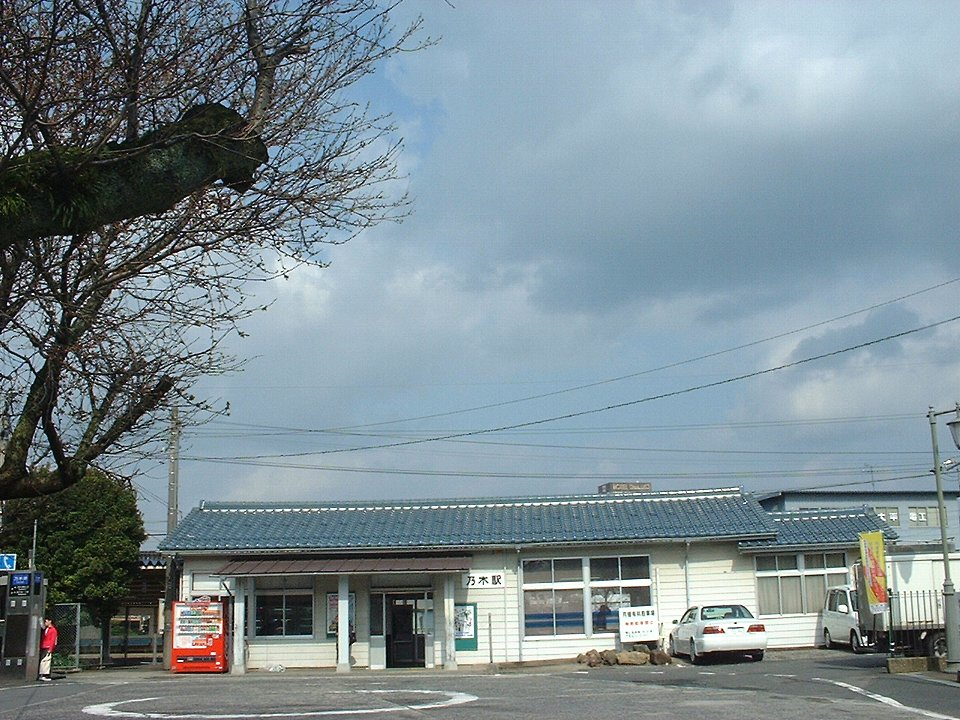
- Nogi Station, March 2003

General information
- Location: 2-chōme-15 Hamanogi, Matsue-shi, Shimane-ken 690-0044; Japan
- Coordinates: 35°26′45.34″N 133°2′55.35″E
- Owner: West Japan Railway Company
- Operator: West Japan Railway Company
- Line: D San'in Main Line
- Distance: 354.6 km (220.3 miles) from Kyoto
- Platforms: 2 side platforms
- Tracks: 2
- Connections: Bus stop

Other information
- Status: Unstaffed
- Website: Official website

History
- Opened: 10 April 1937

Passengers
- FY 2020: 816 daily (boarding only)

Services
Preceding station	JR West	Following station
Tamatsukuri-Onsen towards Masuda	San'in Line Local	Matsue towards Yonago
Location
- Location within Shimane Prefecture Location within Japan

Nogi Station (乃木駅, Nogi-eki) is a passenger railway station located in the city of Matsue, Shimane Prefecture, Japan. It is operated by the West Japan Railway Company (JR West).

== Lines ==
Nogi Station is served by the JR West San'in Main Line, and is located 354.6 kilometers from the terminus of the line at Kyoto.

== Station layout ==
The station consists of two opposed side platforms connected to the station building by a footbridge. The station building is unattended.

== Platforms ==
1	■ D San'in Main Line	for Izumoshi and Gōtsu
2	■ D San'in Main Line	for Matsue, and Yonago

== Adjacent stations ==
West Japan Railway Company (JR West)

«	Service	»
Sanin Main Line
Sleeper Limited Express Sunrise Izumo: Does not stop at this station
Limited Express Super Oki: Does not stop at this station
Limited Express Super Matsukaze: Does not stop at this station
Rapid Commuter Liner: Does not stop at this station
Matsue	Rapid Aqua Liner	Tamatsukuri-Onsen
Matsue	Rapid Tottori Liner	Tamatsukuri-Onsen
Matsue	Local	Tamatsukuri-Onsen

== History ==
Nogi Station was opened on 10 April 1937. With the privatization of the Japan National Railway (JNR) on 1 April 1987, the station came under the aegis of the West Japan Railway Company (JR West).

== Passenger statistics ==
In fiscal 2020, the station was used by an average of 816 passengers daily.

== Surrounding area ==
- Shimane Prefectural Matsue Agriculture and Forestry High School
- Matsue Nishi High School
- Shotoku Gakuin Junior and Senior High School
- Matsue City Nogi Elementary School
- Matsue City Hospital

== See also ==
- List of railway stations in Japan
