= Yasugi Station =

Railway station in Yasugi, Shimane Prefecture, Japan

Yasugi Station 安来駅
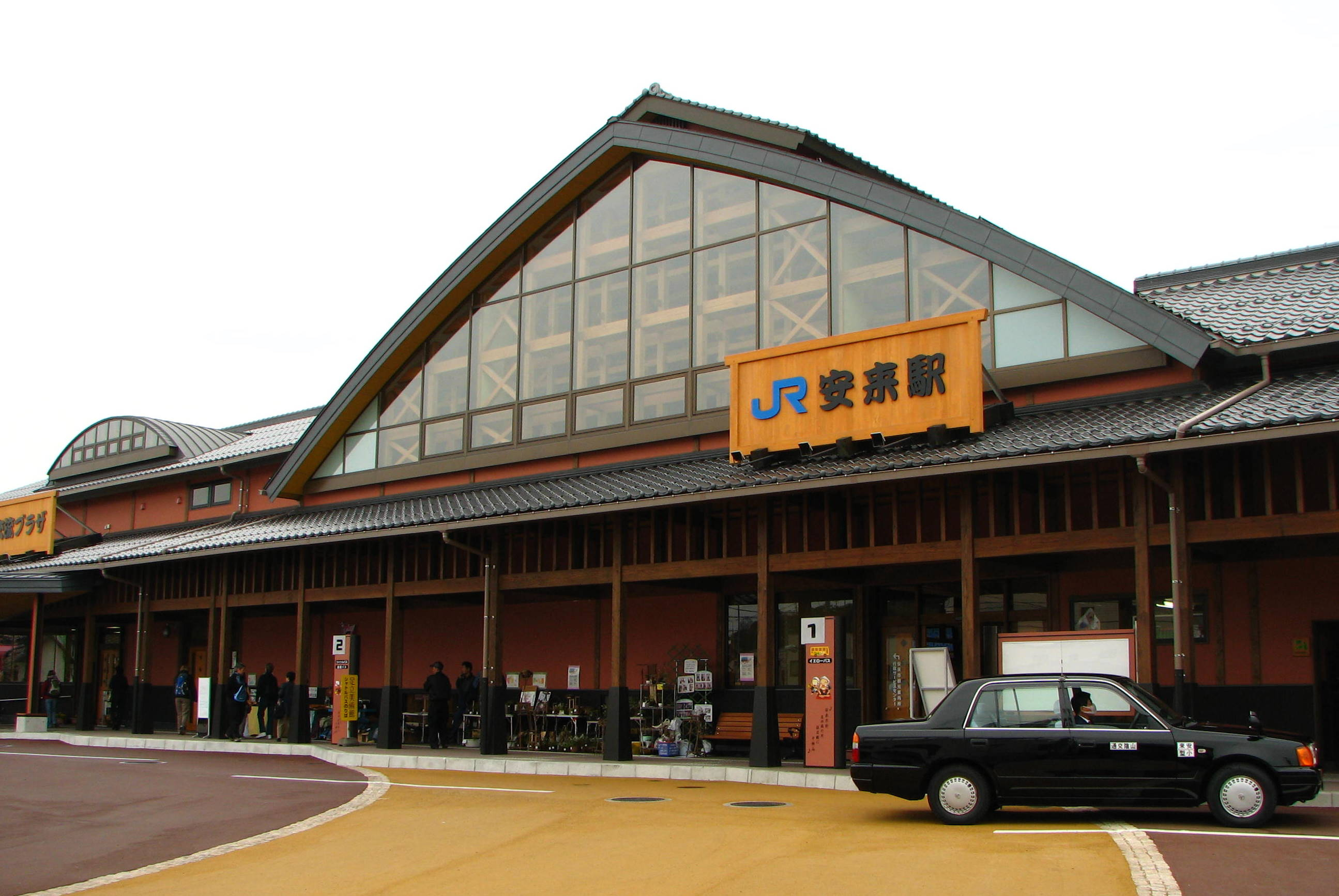
- Yasugi Station in April 2008

General information
- Location: 2136, Yasugi-chō, Yasugi-shi, Shimane-ken 692-0011; Japan
- Coordinates: 35°25′41.51″N 133°15′32.81″E
- Owner: West Japan Railway Company
- Operator: West Japan Railway Company
- Line: D San'in Main Line
- Distance: 331.8 km (206.2 miles) from Kyoto
- Platforms: 1 side + island platform
- Tracks: 3
- Connections: Bus stop

Other information
- Status: Staffed
- Website: Official website

History
- Opened: 5 April 1908

Passengers
- FY 2020: 661 daily (boarding only)

Services
Preceding station	JR West	Following station
Arashima towards Masuda	San'in Line Local	Yonago Terminus
Location
- Location within Shimane Prefecture Location within Japan

Yasugi Station (安来駅, Yasugi-eki) is a passenger railway station located in the city of Yasugi, Shimane Prefecture, Japan. It is operated by the West Japan Railway Company (JR West).

== Lines ==
Yasugi Station is served by the JR West San'in Main Line, and is located 331.8 kilometers from the terminus of the line at Kyoto.

== Station layout ==
The station consists of one side platform and island platform connected by a footbridge. The station building is located adjacent to the side platform. The station is attended.

== Platforms ==
1	■ D San'in Main Line	for Yonago, and Tottori
2, 3	■ D San'in Main Line	for Matsue and Izumoshi

== Adjacent stations ==
«	Service	»
Sanin Main Line
Yonago	Sleeper Limited Express Sunrise Izumo	Matsue
Yonago	West Express Ginga	Matsue
Yonago	Limited Express Super Oki	Matsue
Yonago	Limited Express Super Matsukaze	Matsue
Yonago	Rapid Commuter Liner	Arashima
Yonago	Rapid Aqua Liner	Arashima
Yonago	Rapid Tottori Liner	Arashima

== History ==
Yasugi Station was opened on 5 April 1908, serving the town of Yasugi. With the privatization of Japanese National Railways (JNR) on 1 April 1987, the station came under the control of JR West. At this time, the line was extended from Yonago Station on the Japan Government Railways. The line was further extended to Matsue Station in November of the same year. With the privatization of the Japan National Railway (JNR) on 1 April 1987, the station came under the aegis of the West Japan Railway Company (JR West).

== Passenger statistics ==
In fiscal 2020, the station was used by an average of 661 passengers daily.

== Surrounding area ==
- Yasugi City Hall
- Yasugi Port
- Yasugi City Daiichi Junior High School

== See also ==
- List of railway stations in Japan
