= Yasugi, Shimane =

Yasugi 安来市
- City
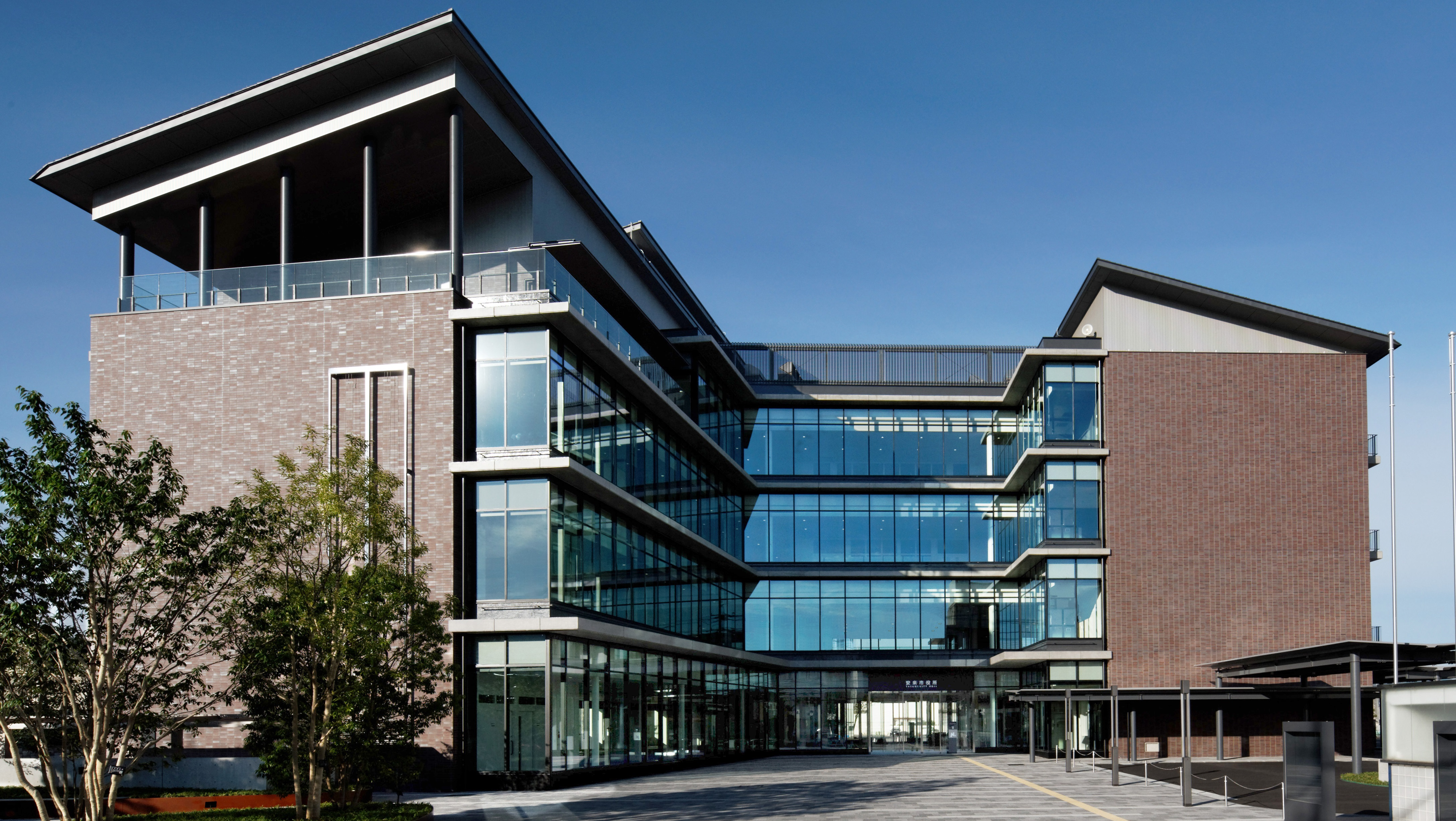
- Yasugi City Hall

- Flag Seal
- Location of Yasugi in Shimane Prefecture

- Location in Japan
- Coordinates: 35°25′53″N 133°15′03″E
- Country: Japan
- Region: Chūgoku (San'in)
- Prefecture: Shimane

Government
  - Mayor: Takeo Tanaka (since October 2020)

Area
  - Total: 420.93 km^{2} (162.52 sq mi)

Population (August 30, 2023)
  - Total: 35,965
  - Density: 85.442/km^{2} (221.29/sq mi)
- Time zone: UTC+09:00 (JST)
- City hall address: Yasugi-cho 878-2, Yasugi-shi, Shimane-ken 692-8686
- Symbols
- Bird: Swan
- Fish: Pond loach
- Flower: Bamboo
- Tree: Cherry blossom

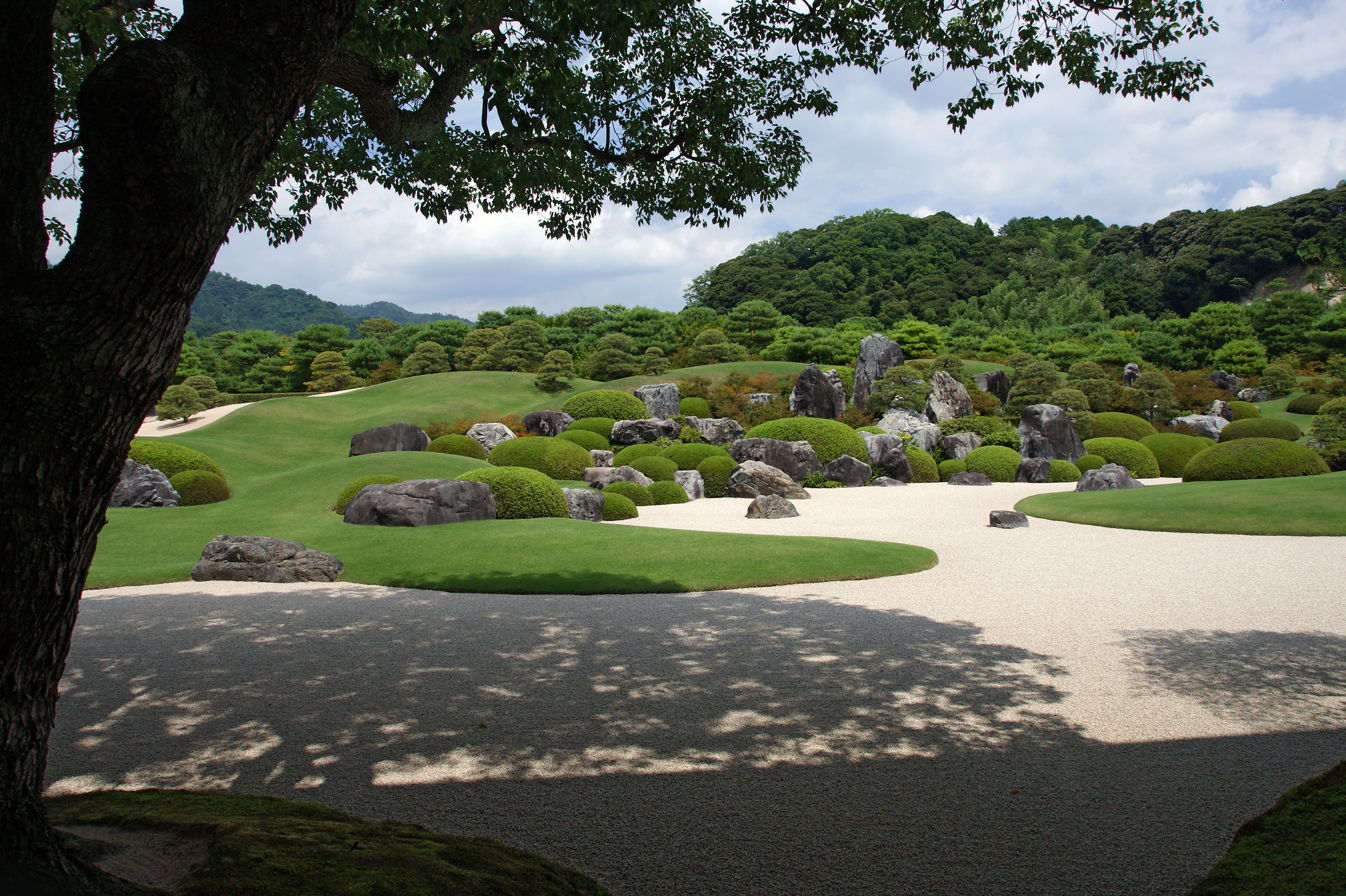
Adachi Museum gardens

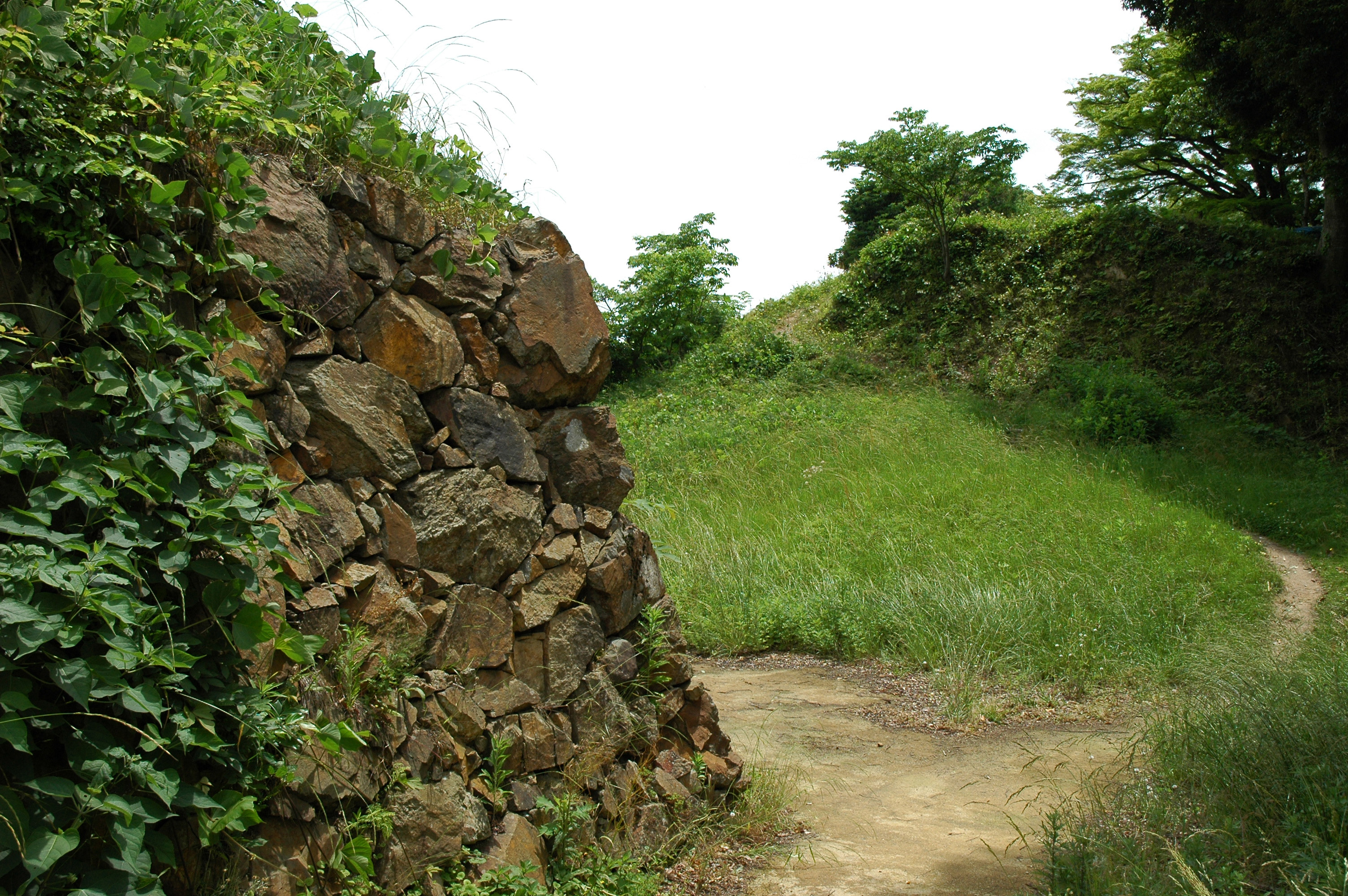
ruins of Gassan-Toda Castle

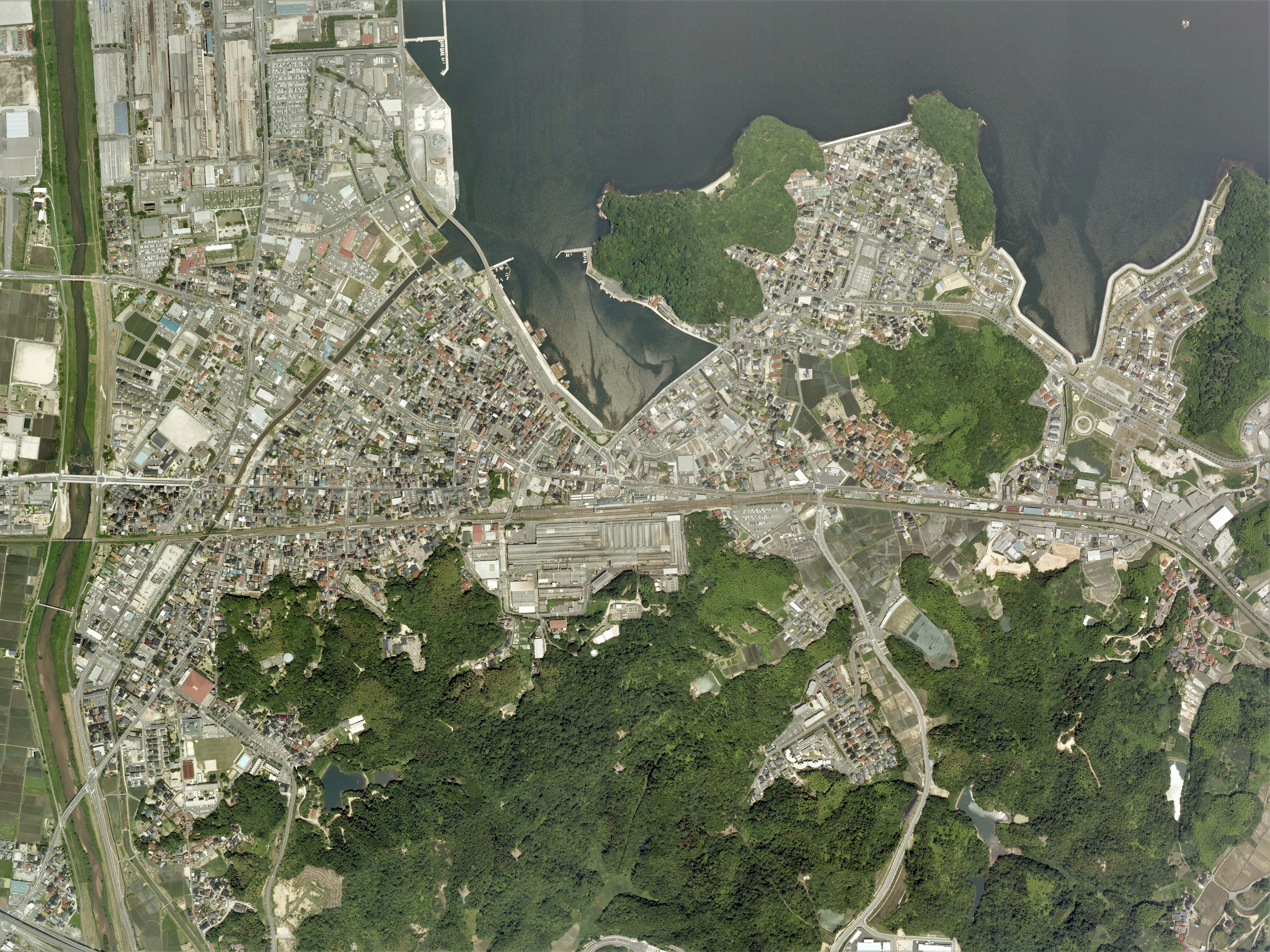
Yasugi city center

Yasugi (安来市, Yasugi-shi) is a city located in Shimane Prefecture, Japan. As of 31 May 2023, the city had an estimated population of 35,965 in 14257 households and a population density of 85 persons per km^{2}. The total area of the city is 420.93 square kilometres (162.52 sq mi).

== Geography ==
Yasugi is located in far eastern Shimane, bordered by the Nakaumi to the north, the Chugoku Mountains to the south and Tottori Prefecture to the east.

=== Neighboring municipalities ===
Shimane Prefecture

- Matsue
- Okuizumo
- Unnan

Tottori Prefecture

- Nanbu
- Nichinan
- Sakaiminato
- Yonago

=== Climate ===
The city has a climate characterized by hot and humid summers, and relatively mild winters (Köppen climate classification Cfa). The average annual temperature in Yasugi is 14.9 °C. The average annual rainfall is 1828 mm with September as the wettest month. The temperatures are highest on average in August, at around 26.2 °C, and lowest in January, at around 4.6 °C.

== Demographics ==
Per Japanese census data, the population of Yasugi has been declining over the past 40 years.

Historical population
Year	Pop.	±%
1940	46,239	—
1950	54,689	+18.3%
1960	52,943	−3.2%
1970	48,382	−8.6%
1980	49,321	+1.9%
1990	48,492	−1.7%
2000	45,255	−6.7%
2010	41,604	−8.1%

== History ==
The area of Yasugi was the center of ancient Izumo, which was a powerful kingdom during the Yayoi and Kofun period. According to legend, the goddess Izanami was buried here. The port at Yasugi on the Nakaumi was a center for trade with the Korean Peninsula from ancient times. Due to plentiful supplies of iron sand and timber, ancient tatara steelmaking flourished and was a source of economic strength. The Yasugi Steel brand name bears the name of the city, and was established by Hitachi Metals, Ltd. During the Sengoku Period, Gassantoda Castle was the stronghold of the Amago clan, and under the Edo Period Tokugawa shogunate, the area was ruled by Matsue Domain. After the Meiji restoration, the town of Yasugi was established on April 1, 1889, with the creation of the modern municipalities system. The city was founded on April 1, 1954, by the merger of Yasugi with the villages of Iinashi, Arashima, Akae, Shimada, and Otsuka. On October 1, 2004, the towns of Hakuta and Hirose (both from Nogi District) were merged into Yasugi.

== Government ==
Yasugi has a mayor-council form of government with a directly elected mayor and a unicameral city council of 18 members. Yasugi contributes two members to the Shimane Prefectural Assembly. In terms of national politics, the city is part of the Shimane 1st district of the lower house of the Diet of Japan.

== Economy ==
The local economy is strongly oriented to agriculture.

== Education ==
Yasugi has 17 public elementary school and five public junior high schools operated by the city government, and two public high schools operated by the Shimane Prefectural Board of Education.

== Transportation ==
=== Railway ===
JR West (JR West) - San'in Main Line

- Yasugi - Arashima

=== Highways ===
- San'in Expressway
- National Route 9
- National Route 432

== Sister cities ==
- Miryang, Gyeongsangnam-do, South Korea

== Local attractions ==
- The Adachi Museum of Art has a widely known Japanese garden and a collection of contemporary Japanese paintings, comprising approximately 1,300 of the country's most highly regarded paintings produced after the Meiji period and centering on the works of Yokoyama Taikan. In 2021, the gardens of the Adachi Museum were ranked as the best in Japan for the 19th year in a row. There is a free shuttle between JR Yasugi Station and the museum (20 minutes).
- Gassantoda Castle ruins, National Historic Site

== Culture ==
The city is known for Yasugibushi, a well-known folk song (Minyo) in Japan.

== Notable people from Yasugi ==
- Yoshio Sakurauchi, politician
- Yukio Sakurauchi, politician
