= Matsue Station =

Railway station in Matsue, Shimane Prefecture, Japan

Matsue Station 松江駅
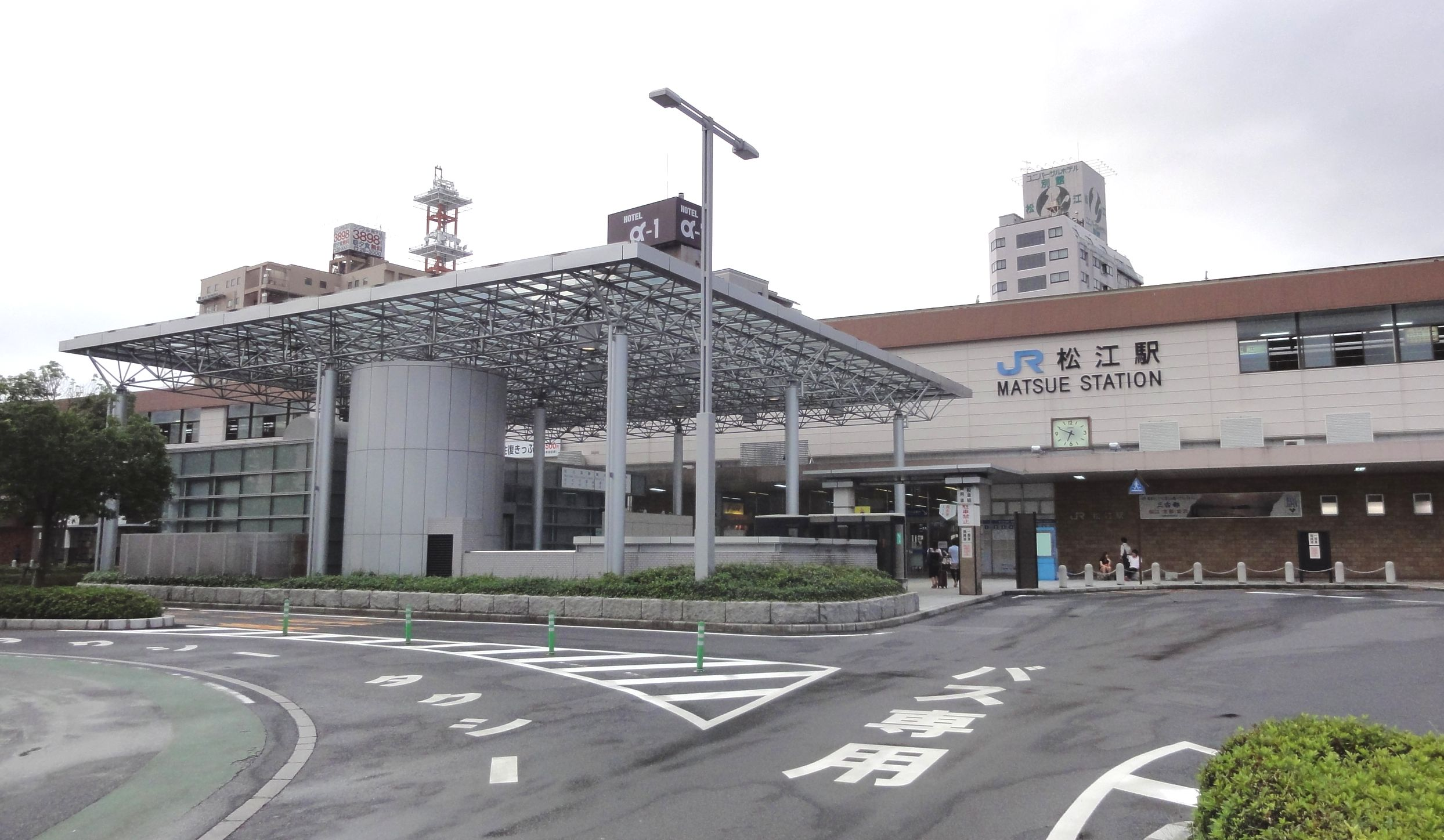
- Matsue Station, July 2011

General information
- Location: 472-2, Asahi-machi, Matsue-shi, Shimane-ken 690-0003; Japan
- Coordinates: 35°27′50.59″N 133°3′49.25″E
- Owner: West Japan Railway Company
- Operator: West Japan Railway Company
- Line: D San'in Main Line
- Distance: 351.9 km (218.7 miles) from Kyoto
- Platforms: 2 island platforms
- Tracks: 4
- Connections: Bus stop

Other information
- Status: Staffed ( Midori no Madoguchi)
- Website: Official website

History
- Opened: 8 November 1908

Passengers
- FY 2020: 2931 daily (boarding only)

Services
| Preceding station | JR West | Following station |
|---|---|---|
| Nogi towards Masuda | San'in Line Local | Higashi-Matsue towards Yonago |
Location
- Location within Shimane Prefecture Location within Japan

Matsue Station (松江駅, Matsue-eki) is a passenger railway station located in the city of Matsue, Shimane Prefecture, Japan. It is operated by the West Japan Railway Company (JR West).

== Lines ==
Matsue Station is served by the JR West San'in Main Line, and is located 351.9 kilometers from the terminus of the line at Kyoto.

== Station layout ==
The station consists of two elevated island platforms with the station building at ground level underneath. The station has a Midori no Madoguchi staffed ticket office.

== Platforms ==
| 1, 2 | ■ D San'in Main Line | for Yonago, Tottori and Okayama |
| 3, 4 | ■ D San'in Main Line | for Izumoshi, Hamada and Shin-Yamaguchi |

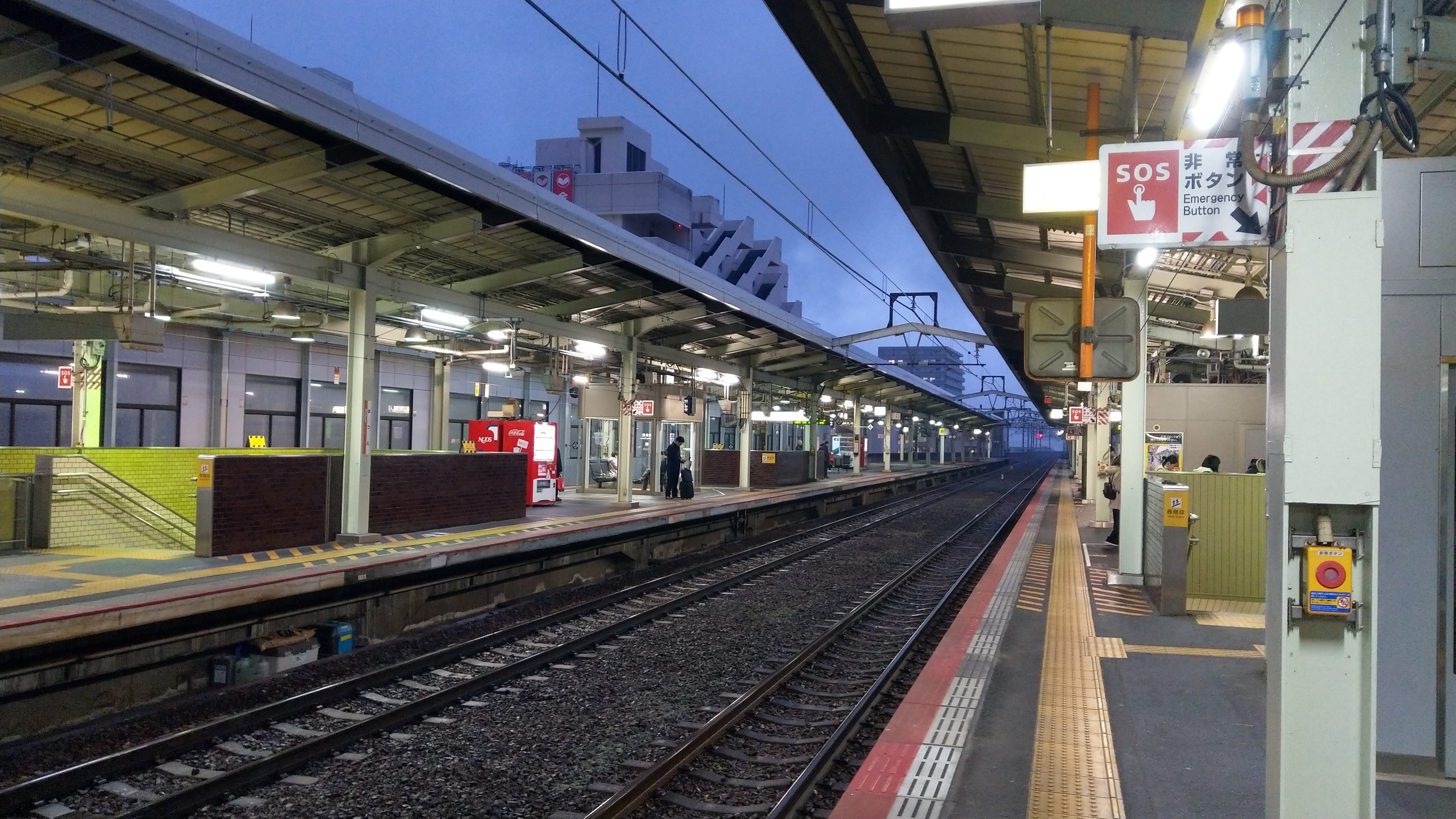
Platform of Matsue Station

== Adjacent stations ==
West Japan Railway Company (JR West)

| « | Service | » |
Sanin Main Line
| Yasugi | Sleeper Limited Express Sunrise Izumo | Shinji |
| Yasugi | West Express Ginga | Tamatsukuri-Onsen |
| Yasugi | Limited Express Super Oki | Tamatsukuri-Onsen |
| Yasugi or Yonago | Limited Express Super Matsukaze | Tamatsukuri-Onsen |
| Higashi-Matsue | Rapid Commuter Liner | Shinji |
| Higashi-Matsue | Rapid Aqua Liner | Nogi |
| Higashi-Matsue | Rapid Tottori Liner | Nogi |
| Higashi-Matsue | Local | Nogi |

== History ==
Matsue Station was opened on 8 November 1908 when the line was extended from Yasugi Station on the Japan Government Railways. The line was further extended to Shinji Station on 12 October 1908. With the privatization of the Japan National Railway (JNR) on 1 April 1987, the station came under the aegis of the West Japan Railway Company (JR West).

== Passenger statistics ==
In fiscal 2020, the station was used by an average of 2931 passengers daily.

== Surrounding area ==
- Shimane Prefectural Museum of Art
- Matsue City Chuo Elementary School
- Matsue City Third Junior High School
- Japan National Route 9

== See also ==
- List of railway stations in Japan
