= Ijimi Ichirizuka =

- 伊志見一里塚 (Japanese)
- Ijimi Ichirizuka Ijimi Ichirizuka (Japan)
- Interactive map of Ijimi Ichirizuka
- 35°23′52″N 132°52′35″E
- Periods: Edo period
- Location: Matsue, Shimane, Japan
- Region: San'in region

Site notes
- Public access: Yes

The Ijimi Ichirizuka (伊志見一里塚) is a historic Japanese distance marker akin to a milestone, comprising a pair of earthen mounds located in what is now the Shinji neighborhood of the city of Matsue, Shimane Prefecture in the San'in region of Japan. It was designated a National Historic Site of Japan in 1937.

== Overview ==
During the Edo period the Tokugawa shogunate established ichirizuka on major roads, enabling calculation both of distance travelled and of the charge for transportation by kago or palanquin. These mounds denoted the distance in ri (3.927 kilometres (2.440 mi)) typically to Nihonbashi, the "Bridge of Japan", erected in Edo in 1603. They were typically planted with an enoki or Japanese red pine to provide shelter for travelers. Since the Meiji period, most of the ichirizuka have disappeared, having been destroyed by the elements, modern highway construction and urban encroachment. In 1876, the "Ichirizuka Abolition decree" was issued by the Meiji government and many were demolished at that time. Currently, 17 surviving ichirizuka are designated as national historic sites.

In the case of the Ijimi Ichirizuka the mounds flank the Sanindō (山陰道), the highway which connected Kyushu with Kyoto via the Sea of Japan coast. It was constructed by Matsue Domain in 1607 and is the 5th marker west from Matsue Castle and the 13th from the border of Izumo Province with Hōki Province. It is one of only three ichirizuka that have been confirmed in Shimane Prefecture (the others are the Yasugi Ichirizuka in Yasui and the Shussai-Iwano Ichirizuka in Izumo). The north mound is about 5.1 meters in diameter and 1.3 meters in height, and the south mound is about 5.0 meters in diameter and 0.7 meters in height. When designated a National Historic Site, the mounds still had pine trees, with the one on the south mound 16.4 meters tall, and the one on the north mound 15.5 meters. The trees no longer exist. The distance between the mounds is 5.5 meters, which provides evidence of the width of the Edo period Sanindō highway. The Ijimi Ichirizuka is located about 900 meters from Shōbara Station on the JR West San'in Main Line.

== See also ==
- List of Historic Sites of Japan (Shimane)
