= Horio =

Horio (堀尾) is a Japanese surname. Notable people with the surname include:

- Horio Yoshiharu (堀尾 吉晴, 1542–1611), Japanese warlord
- Horio Tadauji (堀尾 忠氏, 1578–1604), Japanese warlord
- Horio Tadaharu (堀尾 忠晴, 1596–1633), Japanese warlord

== See also ==
- Halki (Greece) (Horio or Chorio), Greek village in the island of Halki
- Horio, Othonoi island, Greece
