= Shussai-Iwano Ichirizuka =

- 出西・伊波野一里塚 (Japanese)
- Shussai-Iwano Ichirizuka Shussai-Iwano Ichirizuka (Japan)
- Interactive map of Shussai-Iwano Ichirizuka
- 35°22′33″N 132°48′24″E
- Periods: Edo period
- Location: Izumo, Shimane, Japan
- Region: San'in region

Site notes
- Public access: Yes

The Shussai-Iwano Ichirizuka (出西・伊波野一里塚) is a historic Japanese distance marker akin to a milestone, comprising a pair of earthen mounds located in what is now part of the city of Izumo, Shimane Prefecture in the San'in region of Japan. It was designated a National Historic Site of Japan in 1937.

== Overview ==
During the Edo period the Tokugawa shogunate established ichirizuka on major roads, enabling calculation both of distance travelled and of the charge for transportation by kago or palanquin. These mounds denoted the distance in ri (3.927 kilometres (2.440 mi)) typically to Nihonbashi, the "Bridge of Japan", erected in Edo in 1603. They were typically planted with an enoki or Japanese red pine to provide shelter for travelers. Since the Meiji period, most of the ichirizuka have disappeared, having been destroyed by the elements, modern highway construction and urban encroachment. In 1876, the "Ichirizuka Abolition decree" was issued by the Meiji government and many were demolished at that time. Currently, 17 surviving ichirizuka are designated as national historic sites.

In the case of the Shussai-Iwano Ichirizuka the mounds flank the Sanindō (山陰道), the highway which connected Kyushu with Kyoto via the Sea of Japan coast. It was constructed by Matsue Domain in 1607 and is the 7th marker west from Matsue Castle and the 15th from the border of Izumo Province with Hōki Province. The name was given because Higashizuka belonged to the former Shussai village whereas Nishizuka belonged to the former Iwano village. It is one of only three ichirizuka that have been confirmed in Shimane Prefecture (the others are the Yasugi Ichirizuka in Yasui and the Ijimi Ichirizuka in Matsue). A pine tree was once planted on each mound, but were killed by an especially severe winter in 1971 and now only the stumps remain. The Shussai-Iwano ichirizuka is located about 10 minutes on foot from Naoe Station on the JR West San'in Main Line.

== See also ==
- List of Historic Sites of Japan (Shimane)
