= List of han =

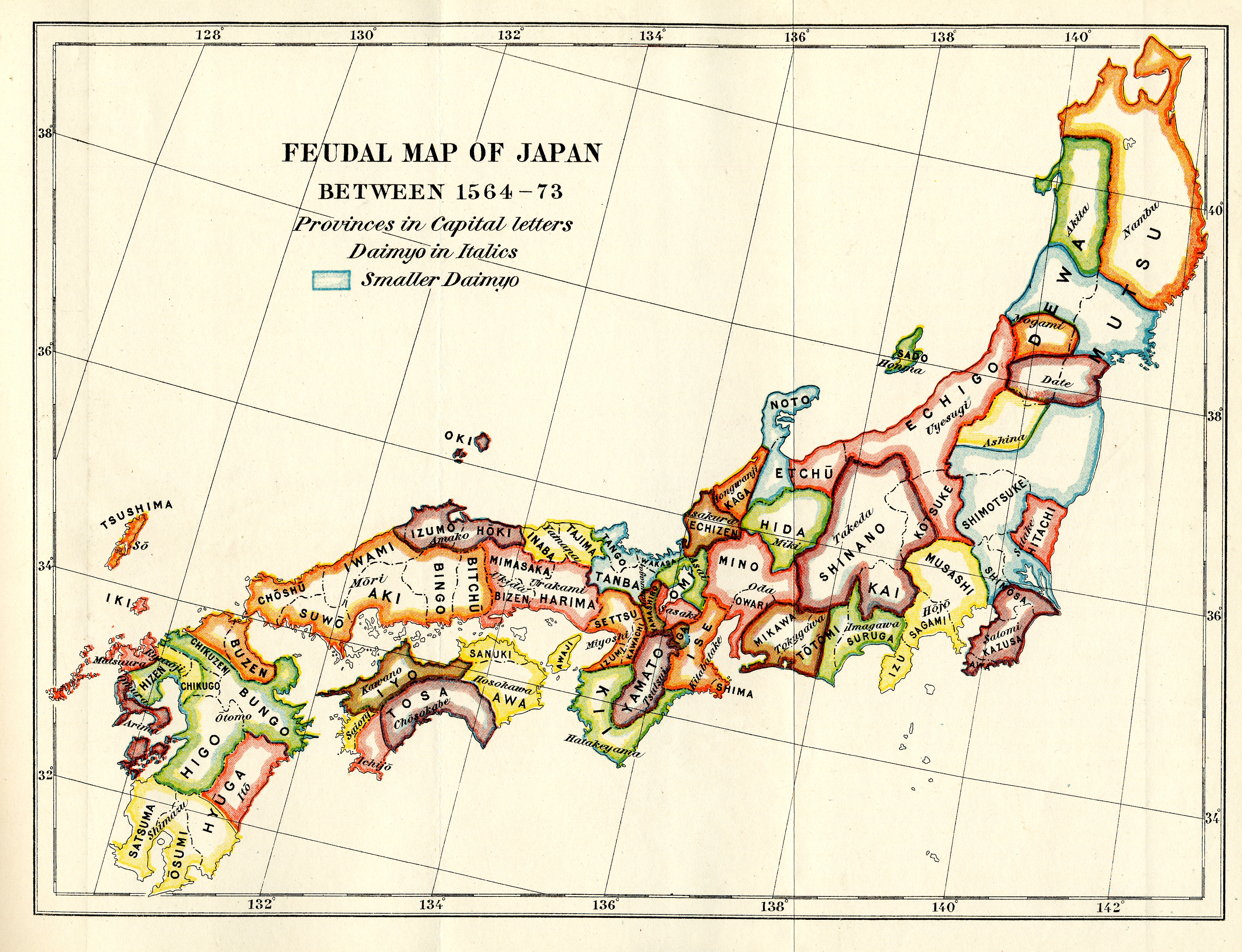
Map of Japan, 1855 – The major Sengoku period feudal domains between 1564 and 1573.

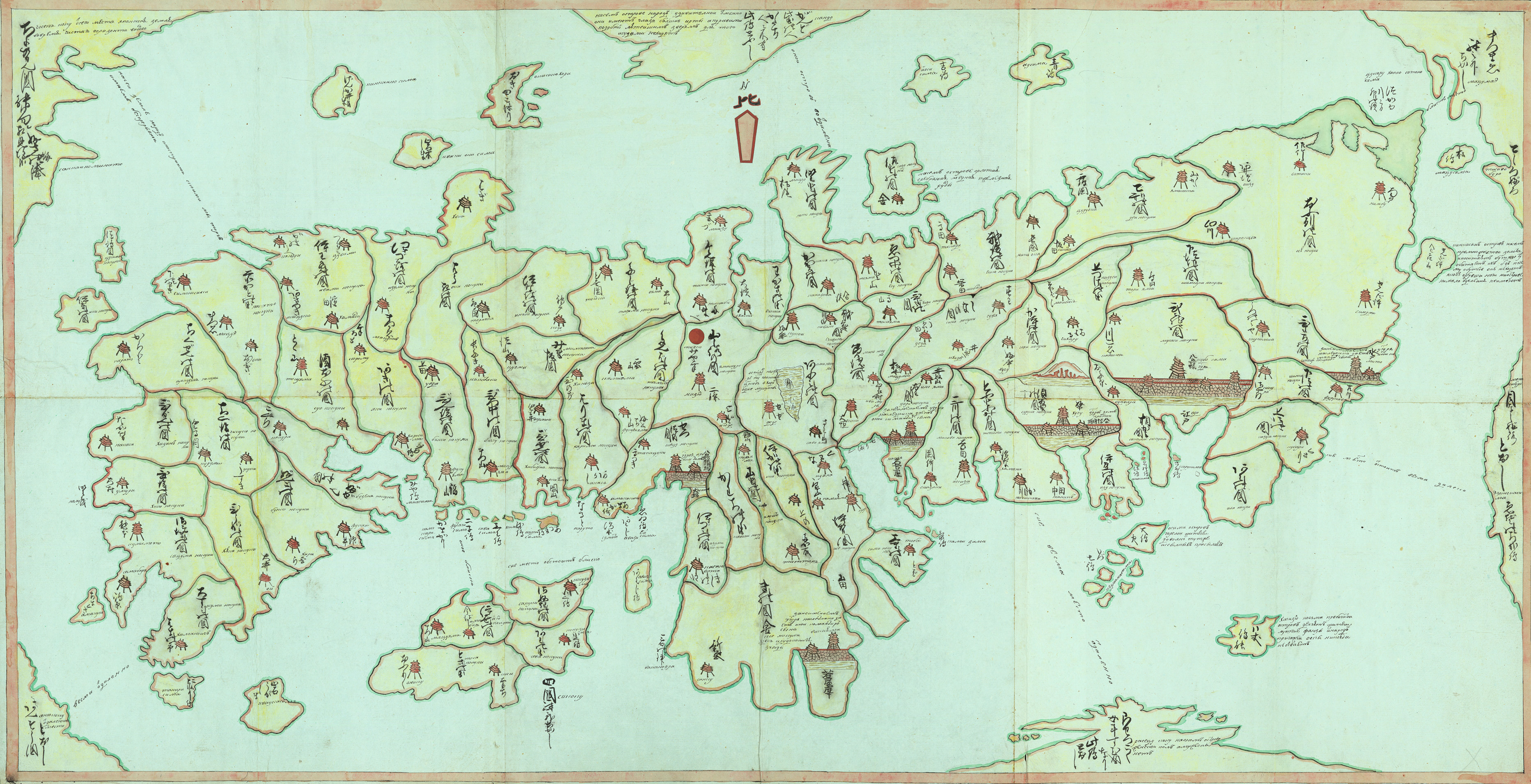
A Japanese/Cyrillic 1789 map of Japan showing provincial borders and the castle towns of han and major shogunate castles/cities

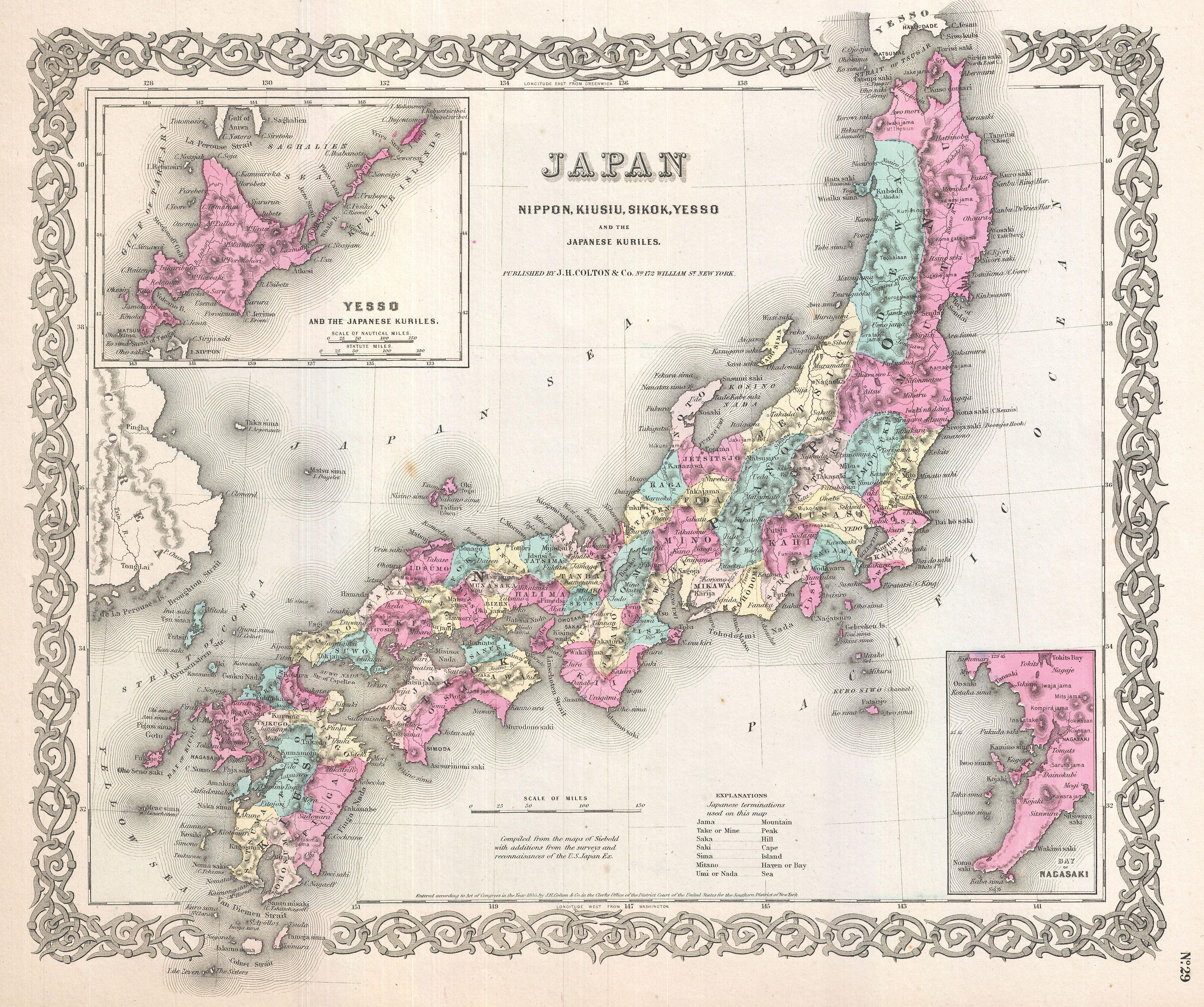
Map of Japan, 1855, with provinces.

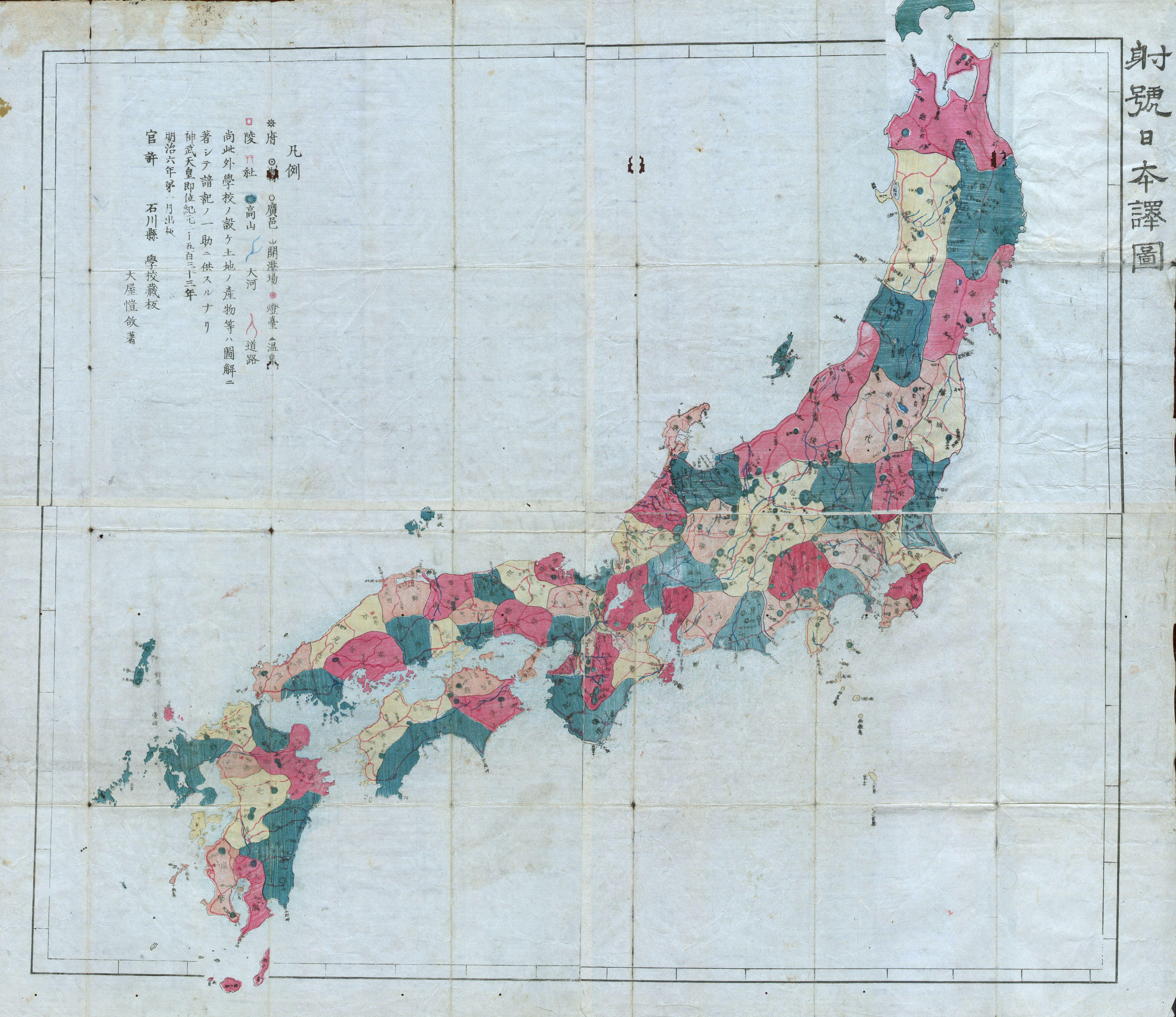
Map of Japan, 1871, with provinces.

The list of han or domains in the Tokugawa period (1603–1868) changed from time to time during the Edo period. Han were feudal domains that formed the effective basis of administration in Tokugawa-era Japan. The Han are given according to their domain seat/castle town by modern region (-chihō, roughly comparable to ancient circuits, -dō) and ancient province (kuni/-shū, roughly comparable to modern prefectures, -to/-dō/-fu/-ken). Han usually comprised territories around/near the capital, but were beyond that in many cases disconnected and distributed over several provinces.

The han system was abolished by the Meiji government in 1871 when all remaining -han were transformed into -ken ("prefectures"). In several waves of mergers, splits and territorial transfers – the first major consolidation followed immediately in 1871/72 – the prefectures were reorganized to encompass contiguous, compact territories, no longer resembling Edo period han, but in many cases territorially identical to provinces which had remained the most important primary geographical subdivision even during feudal times.

== Hokkaidō ==
- Matsumae (1590-1871) – Located around modern-day Matsumae town, Matsumae District; held by the Matsumae clan. Only domain in Ezo. Renamed to Tate after the restoration when the domain seat was moved from Matsumae/Fukuyama castle (in present-day Matsumae town) which had been destroyed in the Boshin war to Tate castle (in present-day Asabu town), became Tate-ken ("Tate prefecture") in 1871 and was merged into Aomori-ken ("Aomori Prefecture") the same year, finally in 1872, transferred to the settlement/development agency (kaitakushi), the precursor to Hokkaidō ("Hokkai circuit/territory/from 1946: prefecture").

== Tōhoku ==
=== Mutsu Province (Present-day Fukushima, Miyagi, Iwate and Aomori Prefectures) ===
- Hirosaki (1590-1871) – Located in modern-day Aomori Prefecture
- Kuroishi (1809-1871) – Branch of Hirosaki han, based in modern-day Kuroishi, Aomori
- Hachinohe (1664-1871) – Branch of Morioka han
- Kunohe (unknown dates) – Branch of Morioka Domain, corresponded to modern Kunohe District, Iwate
- Morioka (de facto: 1592-1871/de jure: 1599-1871) – Located in modern-day Akita, Aomori, and Iwate Prefectures, originally consisted of 10 districts – in modern Iwate: Iwate, Hienuki, Waga, Shiwa, Kunohe, Ninohe, and Hei (now split into Kamihei and Shimohei); in modern Aomori: Sannohe and Kita (now divided into Kamikita and Shimokita districts); in modern Akita: Kazuno
- Kōri (dates unknown) – Based in modern-day Koori town, Date District, Fukushima
- Aizu (de facto: 1384-1871/ De jure:1601-1871) – Based in modern-day Aizuwakamatsu, Fukushima Prefecture; controlled by the Hoshina (Matsudaira) family.
- Ichinoseki (1681-1871) – Branch of Sendai han, based in modern-day Ichinoseki, Iwate; held by the Tamura clan, a branch family of the Date clan
- Iwakitaira (1602-1871) – Based in modern-day Iwaki, Fukushima. Held by the Torii family briefly from 1606–1622, held by the Andō clan from mid-18th century to 1868.
- Miharu (de facto: 1504-1590,1627-1971/de jure: 1627-1871) – Held by the Kato, Matsushita, and Akita families.
- Moriyama (1700-1871) – Held by the Mito-Matsudaira clan, a branch of the Tokugawa。
- Sendai (1600-1868) – Based in modern-day Sendai, Miyagi; held by the Date clan.
  - Mizusawa Domain (dates unknown) – subdomain
- Shimotedo (1806-1868) – Based in modern-day Tsukidate town, Date District, Fukushima. Held by the Tachibana clan.
- Yunagaya (1670-1871)
- Izumi (1634-1871)
- Fukushima (1679-1868)
- Shichinohe (1819-1871)
- Yanagawa Domain (Mutsu) (1683-1821)
- Sōma Nakamura (1625-1871)
- Tanagura (1603-1866)
- Shirakawa (1627-1866)

=== Dewa Province (Present-day Yamagata and Akita Prefectures) ===
- Kubota (1602-1871) – Based in modern-day Akita City; held by the Satake clan.
- Tsuruoka (1622-1871) – Based in modern-day Tsuruoka, Yamagata Prefecture; held by the Sakai clan. Also known as Shōnai Domain.
- Dewa-Matsuyama (1647-1871) (a branch of Tsuruoka)
- Ōyama (1647-1668) (a branch of Tsuruoka)
- Nigaho (1623-1624)
- Yamagata (de jure: 1357-1871/ De jure:1600-1870) – Based in modern-day Yamagata, Yamagata Prefecture; held by the Torii family
- Yonezawa (de facto: 1238-1871/de jure: 1601-1871) – Held by the Uesugi clan.
- Nagatoro (1789-1869) - Held by the Yonezu clan.
- Kameda (1623-1871) - Held by the Iwaki clan.
- Honjō (1623-1868) - Held by the Rokugō clan.
- Shinjō (1622-1871) - Held by the Tozawa clan.
- Kaminoyama (1622-1871)
- Tendo (de facto: 1345-1584,1830-1871/de jure: 1830-1871)
- Yonezawashinden (1719-1869)

== Kantō region ==
=== Hitachi Province (Present-day Central Ibaraki Prefecture) ===
- Mito (de facto 1416-1871/de jure: 1602-1871), held by a branch of the Tokugawa clan.
- Matsukawa (1870-1871) (sub-domain of Mito)
- Matsuoka (1602-1861) (sub-domain of Mito)
- Kasama (de facto: 1219-1871/de jure: 1601-1871)
- Shishido (1602-1871)
- Shimotsuma (1591-1871)
- Shimodate (de facto: 1478-1871/de jure: 1589-1871)
- Hitachi-Fuchū (1602-1871)
- Tsuchiura (de facto: 1429-1871/de jure: 1604-1871)
- Asō (1604-1871)
- Yatabe (1616-1871)
- Ushiku (1628-1871)

=== Shimotsuke Province (Present-day Tochigi Prefecture) ===
- Kurohane (1819-1871)
- Ōtawara (1600-1871) (not to be confused with Odawara)
- Kitsuregawa (1593-1870)
- Utsunomiya (1601-1871)
- Mibu (1601-1871)
- Fukiage (1842-1871)
- Sano (1600-1688)
- Ashikaga (1688-1692/1705-1871)
- Karasuyama (1627-1871)

=== Kōzuke Province (Present-day Gunma Prefecture) ===
- Tatebayashi (1590-1683/1707-1734/1740-1871)
- Isezaki (1601-1617/1636-1662/1681-1871)
- Maebashi (1601-1767/1867-1871)
- Takasaki (1590-1871)
- Numata (1656-1871)
- Yoshii (1590-1610/1682-1693/1709-1871)
- Annaka (1615-1871)
- Nanokaichi (1616-1871)
- Obata (1590-1871)

=== Shimōsa Province (Present-day Northern Chiba, Southeastern Ibaraki and West portion of the Edogawa River in Saitama Prefectures) ===
- Koga (1590-1871)
- Yūki (1590-1871)
- Sekiyado (1590-1871)
- Takaoka (1640-1871)
- Omigawa (1594-1871)
- Sakura (1593-1871) – Based in modern-day Chiba Prefecture; held by the Hotta clan
- Tako (1590-1871)
- Oyumi (1627-1871)

=== Kazusa Province (Present-day Central Chiba Prefecture) ===
- Goi (1781-1842)
- Tsurumaki (1827-1871)
- Jōzai (1825-1871) – Based in modern-day Chiba Prefecture; held by the Hayashi clan (Jōzai). Previously called Kaibuchi, later reassigned to the Takiwaki-Matsudaira clan of Ojima and renamed Sakurai.
- Iino (1648-1871) – Based in modern-day Chiba Prefecture; held by a branch family of the Aizu Domain's Hoshina and later Matsudaira clans.
- Ichinomiya (1826-1871)
- Sanuki (1590-1871)
- Kururi (1590-1871)
- Ōtaki (1590-1871)

=== Awa Province (Present-day Southern Chiba Prefecture) ===
- Awa-Katsuyama (1622-1871)
- Tateyama (1590-1614/1781-1871)
- Hōjō (1638-1827)
- Tokushima (1601-1871)

=== Musashi Province (Present-day Tokyo, Saitama, Northern Kanagawa and Western Chiba Prefectures) ===
- Okabe (1649-1871)
- Kuki (1684-1798)
- Oshi (1590-1600/1633-1871) – Based in modern-day Saitama Prefecture; held by the Matsudaira clan and Abe clan
- Iwatsuki (1590-1871) – Based in modern-day Saitama Prefecture; held by the Kōriki clan, Aoyama clan, Nagai clan, Ōoka clan, Abe clan
- Kawagoe (1590-1871) – Based in modern-day Saitama Prefecture; held by the Sakai clan, Hotta clan, Yanagisawa clan, Akimoto clan, Matsudaira clan
- Mutsuura (1722-1871)

=== Sagami Province (Present-day Southwestern Kanagawa Prefecture) ===
- Odawara (1590-1871) – Based in modern-day Kanagawa Prefecture; held by the Ōkubo clan, Abe clan, Inaba clan
- Oginoyamanaka (1783-1871)

== Chūbu ==
=== Echigo Province (Present-day Niigata Prefecture) ===
- Itoigawa (1692-1871)
- Kurokawa (1724-1871)
- Mikkaichi (1724-1871)
- Mineyama (1620-1868)
- Murakami (1598-1871)
- Muramatsu (1639-1871)
- Nagaoka (1616-1871)
- Shibata (1598-1871)
- Shiiya (1698-1871)
- Takada (1598-1871)
- Yoita (1634-1871)

=== Shinano Province (Present-day Nagano Prefecture) ===
- Iida (1601-1871)
- Iiyama (1603-1871)
- Iwamurada (1703-1871)
- Komoro (1590-1871)
- Matsumoto (1615-1871)
- Matsushiro (1616-1871)
- Ōhama (1765-1777)
- Suzaka (1615-1871)
- Suwa (1590-1871)
- Takatō (1600-1689/1691-1871)
- Tanokuchi (1711-1871)
- Ueda (1600-1871)

=== Kai Province (Present-day Yamanashi Prefecture) ===
- Kōfu (1603-1871)
- Yamura (1709-1724)

=== Etchū Province (Present-day Toyama Prefecture) ===
- Toyama (1639-1871)

=== Kaga Province (Present-day Southern Ishikawa Prefecture) ===
- Daishōji (1639-1871)
- Kaga (1583-1871) – Also known as the Kanazawa Domain.

=== Echizen Province (Present-day Northern Fukui Prefecture) ===
- Fukui (1601-1871)
- Maruoka (1613-1871)
- Ōno (1634-1871)
- Sabae (1720-1871)
- Tsuruga (1682-1871)
- Echizen-Katsuyama (1682-1871)

=== Wakasa Province (Present-day Southern Fukui Prefecture) ===
- Obama (1601-1871)
- Takahama (1600-1608)

== Tōkai ==
=== Suruga Province (Present-day Central Shizuoka Prefecture around Shizuoka City) ===
- Numazu (1601-1871)
- Ōjima (1689-1868)
- Sunpu (1601-1606/1609-1619/1625-1634/1869-1871)
- Tanaka (1601-1868)

=== Tōtōmi Province (Present-day Western Shizuoka Prefecture) ===
- Sagara (1692–1871)
- Kakegawa (1601-1871)
- Yokosuka (1601-1871)
- Hamamatsu (1601-1868)

=== Mikawa Province (Present-day Eastern Aichi Prefecture around Toyohashi) ===
- Yoshida (1601-1871)
- Tahara (1601-1871)
- Hatagamura (1688-1869)
- Nishi-Ōhira (1616-1871)
- Okazaki (1601-1871)
- Koromo (1749-1871)
- Nishio (1601-1871)
- Kariya (1600-1871)
- Ogyū (1684-1711)
- Okutono (1711-1863)
- Ashisuke (dates unknown)
- Shinshiro (1616-1648)

=== Owari Province (Present-day Western Aichi Prefecture around Nagoya) ===
- Owari (1610-1871)
- Inuyama (1617-1871)
- Ogawa (1601-1606)
- Owari Kuroda (dates unknown)
- Kiyosu (1600-1610)

=== Hida Province (Present-day Northern Gifu Prefecture) ===
- Hida-Takayama (1586-1692)

=== Mino Province (Present-day Southern Gifu Prefecture) ===
- Naegi (1600-1871)
- Iwamura (1601-1871)
- Kanō (1601-1871)
- Imao (1607-1871)
- Takasu (1600-1676/1700-1870)
- Takatomi (1664-1871)
- Gujō Domain (1600-1871) (Hachiman Domain)
- Ōgaki (1600-1871)
- Ōgakishinden (1688-1871)

== Kansai ==
=== Ise Province (Present-day Central Mie Prefecture) ===
- Nagashima (1601-1621/1649-1871)
- Kuwana (1601-1871) Held by the Hisamatsu-Matsudaira clan.
- Komono (1600-1871)
- Kanbe (1651-1871)
- Ise-saijo (1726-1781) (Minami-hayashizaki)
- Ise-Kameyama (1601-1871)
- Tsu (1594-1871)
- Hisai (1669-1871)

=== Shima Province (Present-day Eastern Mie Prefecture) ===
- Toba (1597-1680/1691-1871)

=== Ōmi Province (Present-day Shiga Prefecture) ===
- Miyagawa (1698-1871)
- Katada (1698-1826)
- Ōmizo (1619-1871)
- Hikone(1600-1871)
- Hikoneshinden (1714-1734)
- Yamakami (1698-1871)
- Mikami (1690-1871)
- Nisshōji (1620-1871)
- Minakuchi (1712-1871)
- Zeze (1601-1871)

=== Yamashiro Province (Present-day Southern Kyoto Prefecture) ===
- Yodo (1623-1871)

=== Yamato Province (Present-day Nara Prefecture) ===
- Yagyū (1636-1869)
- Kōriyama (1615-1871)
- Koizumi (1600-1871)
- Gose (1620-1629)
- Yanagimoto (1615-1871)
- Kaiju-Shibamura (1615-1871)
- Uda-Matsuyama (1600-1695)
- Kujira (1863-1871)
- Tatsuta (1601-1655)
- Takatori (1640-1871)
- Tawaramoto (1583-1871)
- Yamato-Shinjo (1600–1863)

=== Kii Province (Present-day Wakayama and Southern Mie Prefecture) ===
- Kishū (1600-1871) (ruled by a branch of the Tokugawa clan)
- Kii-Tanabe (1619-1871)
- Kii-Shingu (1600-1871)

=== Izumi Province (Present-day Southern Osaka Prefecture) ===
- Kishiwada (1594-1871)
- Hakata (1727-1871)

=== Kawachi Province (Present-day Eastern Osaka Prefecture) ===
- Sayama (1600-1869)
- Tannan (1623-1871)

=== Settsu Province (Present-day Eastern Hyogo and Northern Osaka Prefectures) ===
- Takatsuki (1615-1871)
- Asada (1615-1871) – Based in modern-day Hyōgo and Osaka Prefectures; held by the Aoki clan
- Amagasaki (1615-1871)
- Sanda (1633-1871)

=== Tanba Province (Present-day Northeastern Hyogo and Central Kyoto Prefecture) ===
- Tanba-Kameyama (1600-1602/1619-1871)
- Sonobe (1619-1871)
- Yamaga (1600-1871)
- Ayabe (1633-1871)
- Fukuchiyama (1600-1620/1621-1871)
- Sasayama (1609-1871)

=== Tango Province (Present-day Northern Kyoto Prefecture) ===
- Tango-Tanabe (1600-1871)
- Miyazu (1600-1666/1669-1871)
- Mineyama (1620–1668)

=== Harima Province (Present-day Southern Hyogo Prefecture) ===
- Akashi (1617-1871)
- Ono (1636-1871)
- Mikusa (1746-1871)
- Himeji (1600-1871)
- Hayashida (1617-1871)
- Tatsuno (1672-1871)
- Anji (1716-1871)
- Mikazuki (1697-1871)
- Akō (1615-1871)
- Yamasaki (1615-1871)
- Fukumoto (1663-1871)

=== Tajima Province (Present-day Northern Hyogo Prefecture) ===
- Izushi (1600-1871)
- Toyooka (1600-1871)
- Yagi (1585-1591)
- Kaibara (1598-1650/1695-1871)

=== Awaji Province (Present-day City of Hyogo Prefecture) ===
- Awaji-sumoto (1678-1725) A part of the Tokushima Domain, it was held by the Inada family, retainers of the Hachisuka clan.

== Chūgoku ==
=== Inaba Province (Present-day Eastern Tottori Prefecture) ===
- Tottori (1587-1871)
- Shikano (1640-1662)
- Wakasa (1868-1870)

=== Hōki Province (Present-day Western Tottori Prefecture) ===
- Yonago (1600-1617)
- Kurayoshi (1614-1622)
- Kurosaka (1611-1618)
- Yabase (1610-1616)

=== Izumo Province (Present-day Eastern Shimane Prefecture) ===
- Hirose (1666-1868)
- Mori (1677-1871)
- Matsue (1600-1871)
- Matsueshinden (1701-1704)

=== Iwami Province (Present-day Western Shimane Prefecture) ===
- Yoshinaga (1682-1871)
- Hamada (1618-1866)
- Tsuwano (1601-1868)

=== Bizen Province (Present-day Southeastern Okayama Prefecture) ===
- Okayama (1600-1871)
- Koshima (1648-1649)

=== Mimasaka Province (Present-day Northeastern Okayama Prefecture) ===
- Tsuyama (1603-1871)
- Tsuyamashinden (1676-1697)
- Katsuyama (1624-1683/1691-1871)

=== Bitchū Province (Present-day Western Okayama Prefecture) ===
- Niwase (1600-1679/16831683/1693-1697/1699-1871)
- Ashimori (1601-1871)
- Ikusaka (1672 - 1871)
- Asao (1603-1871)
- Okada (1615-1871)
- Kamogata (1672-1868)
- Bitchu-Matsuyama (1600-1871)
- Niimi (1697-1871)
- Nariwa (1639-1868)
- Nishiebara (dates unknown)

=== Bingo Province (Present-day Eastern Hiroshima Prefecture) ===
- Fukuyama (1619-1698/1700-1871)
- Mihara (1582-1608/1619-1871)
- Miyoshi (1632-1720)

=== Aki Province (Present-day Western Hiroshima Prefecture) ===
- Hiroshima (1591-1871)
- Hiroshimashinden (1730-1869)

=== Suō Province (Present-day Eastern Yamaguchi Prefecture) ===
- Iwakuni (1587-1871)
- Tokuyama (1650-1871)
- Kudamatsu (dates unknown)

=== Nagato Province (Present-day Western Yamaguchi Prefecture) ===
- Chōshū (1600-1871)
- Chōfu (1600-1871)
- Kiyosue (1653-1871)

== Shikoku ==
=== Awa Province (Present-day Tokushima Prefecture) ===
- Tokushima (1601-1871)
- Awa-Katsuyama (1622-1871)
- Tateyama (1593-1871)
- Hōjō (1638-1827)

=== Sanuki Province (Present-day Kagawa Prefecture) ===
- Takamatsu (1587-1640/1642-1871)
- Marugame (1587-1640/1642-1871)
- Tadotsu (1694-1871)

=== Iyo Province (Present-day Ehime Prefecture) ===
- Saijō (1636-1665/1670-1871)
- Komatsu (1636-1871)
- Imabari (1600-1608/1635-1871)
- Iyo-Matsuyama (1600-1871)
- Ozu (1608-1871)
- Niiya (1623-1868)
- Iyo-Yoshida (1657-1871)
- Uwajima (1608-1613/1614–1871)– It was ruled from 1608 to 1613 by the Tomita clan, then a brief Tenryō (1613–1614), and finally by a branch of the Date clan
- Tomida (dates unknown)
- Matsuyamashinden (1720-1765)

=== Tosa Province (Present-day Kochi Prefecture) ===
- Tosa (1601-1871)
- Tosa-Shinden (1780-1871)

== Kyūshū ==
=== Chikuzen Province (Present-day Northwestern Fukuoka Prefecture) ===
- Fukuoka (1600-1868)
- Akizuki (1623-1871)
- Tōrenji (1623-1677/1688-1720)

=== Chikugo Province (Present-day Southern Fukuoka Prefecture) ===
- Kurume (1620-1871)
- Yanagawa (1600-1871)
- Miike (1621-1806/1868-1871)

=== Buzen Province (Present-day Northeastern Fukuoka and Northwestern Oita Prefecture) ===
- Kokura (1600-1871)
- Kokura Shinden (1667-1871)
- Nakatsu (1600-1871)

=== Bungo Province (Present-day Central Oita Prefecture) ===
- Kitsuki (de facto: 1394-1871/de jure: 1632-1871)
- Hiji (1600-1871)
- Mori (1601-1871)
- Funai (1601-1871)
- Usuki (1600-1871)
- Saiki (1600-1871)
- Oka (1594-1871)

=== Hizen Province (Present-day Saga and Nagasaki Prefectures) ===
- Karatsu (1593-1871)
- Saga (1593-1871)
- Hasunoike (1642-1871)
- Ogi (1642-1871)
- Kashima (1609-1871)
- Hirado (1587-1871)
- Hiradoshinden (1689-1870)
- Ōmura (1587-1871)
- Shimabara (1600-1871)
- Fukue (1603-1871)

=== Tsushima Province (Present-day City of Nagasaki Prefecture) ===
- Tsushima (1587-1868)

=== Higo Province (Present-day Kumamoto Prefecture) ===
- Kumamoto (1600-1871)
- Uto (1646-1870)
- Hitoyoshi (1585-1871)
- Kumamotoshinden (1666-1870)

=== Hyūga Province (Present-day Miyazaki Prefecture) ===
- Nobeoka (1587-1871)
- Takanabe (1587-1871)
- Sadowara (1603-1871)
- Obi (1617-1871)

=== Satsuma Province and Ōsumi Province (Present-day merged as Kagoshima Prefecture) ===
- Satsuma (De Facto :1196-1871/ De jure:1602-1871)
- Ryūkyū (De Facto :1609-1879 / De jure:1872-1879) (Present-day Okinawa Prefecture)

== Notes ==
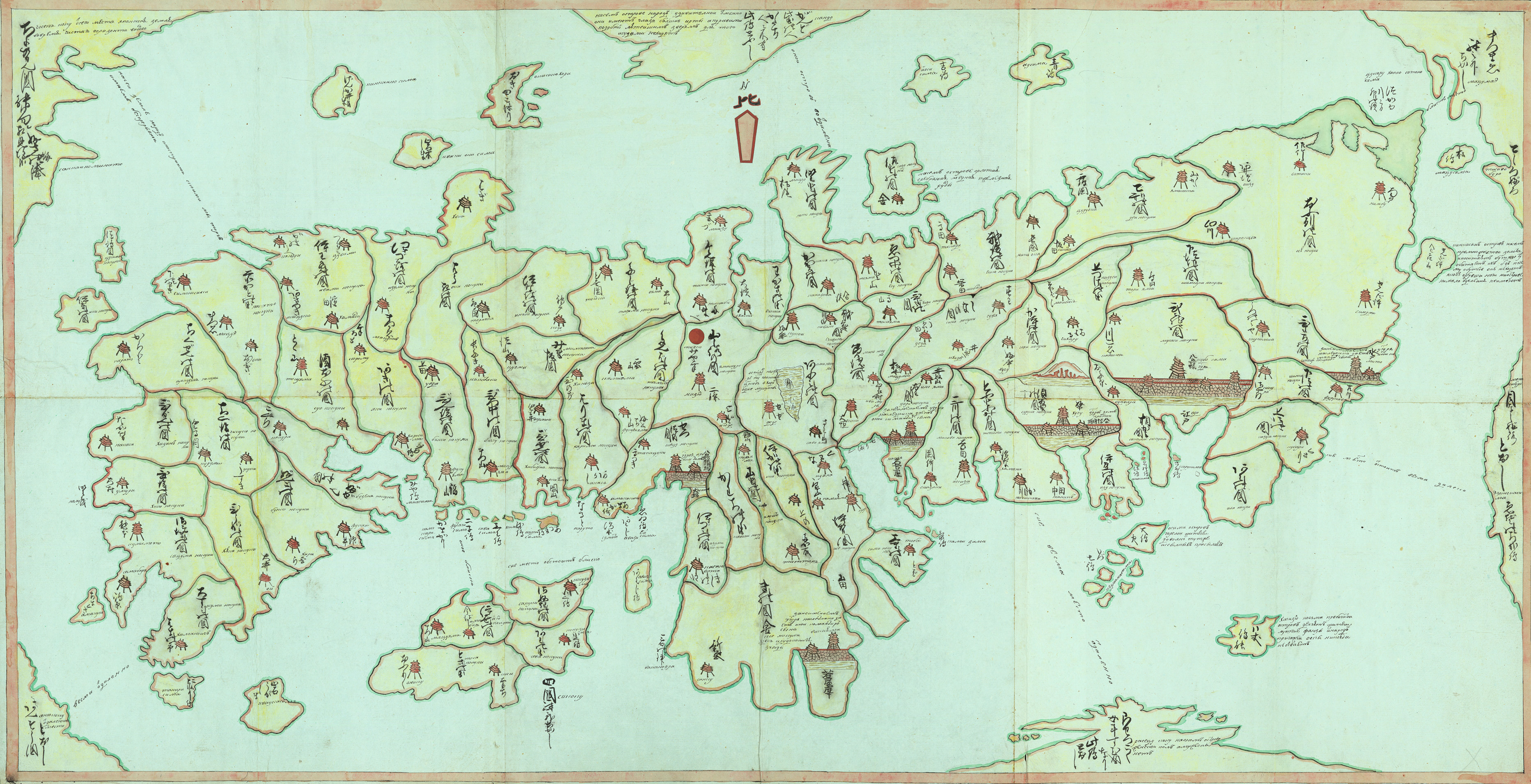
Map of Japan, 1789 -- the Han system affected cartography
