= Tsurumaki =

Tsurumaki may refer to:

- Tsurumaki, a traditional woven Japanese bowstring holder
- Tsurumaki (surname), a Japanese surname
- Tsurumaki Domain, a feudal domain of Japan
