= Yasugi Ichirizuka =

- 安来一里塚 (Japanese)
- Yasugi Ichirizuka Yasugi Ichirizuka (Japan)
- Interactive map of Yasugi Ichirizuka
- 35°25′41″N 133°14′49″E
- Periods: Edo period
- Location: Yasugi, Shimane, Japan
- Region: San'in region

Site notes
- Public access: Yes

The Yasugi Ichirizuka (安来一里塚) is a historic Japanese distance marker akin to a milestone, comprising a pair of earthen mounds located in what is now the Yasugi neighborhood of the city of Yasugi, Shimane Prefecture in the San'in region of Japan. It was designated a National Historic Site of Japan in 1936.

== Overview ==
During the Edo period the Tokugawa shogunate established ichirizuka on major roads, enabling calculation both of distance travelled and of the charge for transportation by kago or palanquin. These mounds denoted the distance in ri (3.927 kilometres (2.440 mi)) typically to Nihonbashi, the "Bridge of Japan", erected in Edo in 1603. They were typically planted with an enoki or Japanese red pine to provide shelter for travelers. Since the Meiji period, most of the ichirizuka have disappeared, having been destroyed by the elements, modern highway construction and urban encroachment. In 1876, the "Ichirizuka Abolition decree" was issued by the Meiji government and many were demolished at that time. Currently, 17 surviving ichirizuka are designated as national historic sites.

In the case of the Yasugi Ichirizuka the mounds flank the Sanindō (山陰道), the highway which connected Kyushu with Kyoto via the Sea of Japan coast. It was constructed by Matsue Domain in 1607 and is the 3rd from the border of Izumo Province with Hōki Province. It is one of only three ichirizuka that have been confirmed in Shimane Prefecture (the others are the Ijimi Ichirizuka in Matsue and the Shussai-Iwano Ichirizuka in Izumo). The north mound is about 6.0 meters in diameter and 1.5 meters in height, and the south mound is about 4.2 meters in diameter and 1.3 meters in height. When designated a National Historic Site, the mounds still had pine trees; however, the one on the south mound was lost in 1979, and the one on the north mound was lost in 1981 due to insect damage. The trees have been replanted.

The Yasugi Ichirizuka is located about 1.2 kilometers west of Yasugi Station on the JR West San'in Main Line.

== See also ==
- List of Historic Sites of Japan (Shimane)
