= Kazuoki =

- Gender: Male

Origin
- Origin: Japanese
- Meaning: Different meanings depending on the kanji used

Kazuoki (written: 一興 or 和興) is a masculine Japanese given name. Notable people with the name include:

- Aoki Kazuoki (青木 一興; 1822–1849), Japanese daimyō
- Kazuoki Azuma (吾妻 一興; born 1939), Japanese mathematician
- Kazuoki Kodama (児玉 和興; born 1965), Japanese Nordic combined skier
- Kazuoki Matsuyama (松山 和興; born 1942), Japanese sailor
