= Takagi Masahira =

Japanese feudal lord (1829–1891)

- 高木正坦
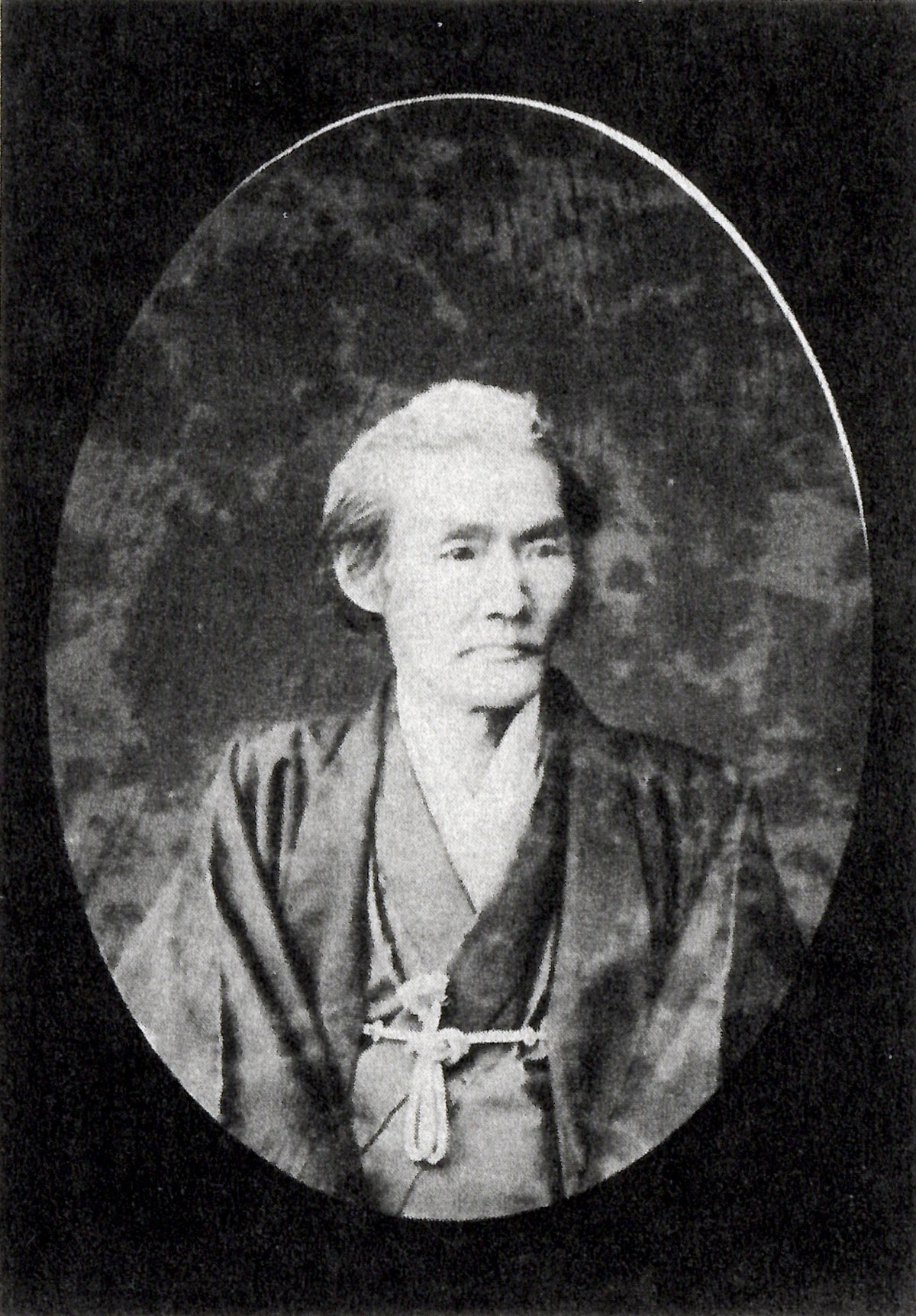

12th daimyō of Tannan Domain
- Reign: August 23, 1848 – March 16, 1869
- Predecessor: Takagi Masaaki
- Successor: Takagi Masayoshi
- Born: March 13, 1829; Kawachi Province, Japan
- Died: January 31, 1891 (aged 61); Tokyo, Japan
- Burial: Seigan-in (Suginami)

Takagi Masahira (高木正坦, March 13, 1829 – January 31, 1891), was a daimyo of the late Edo period. He served as the 12th lord of Tannan Domain in Kawachi Province. His official rank was Jushinoge (Junior Fifth Rank, Lower Grade) and Shusui Sho (Master of the Water Office).

== Biography ==
Takagi Masahira was the fourth son of Matsudaira Yasuyosho. As the previous lord, Masahira's predecessor, Takagi Masaaki, had no heir, Masahira became his adopted son and was granted an audience with the 12th shogun, Tokugawa Ieyoshi, on May 15, 1848. On August 23, 1848, he succeeded to the position of lord due to the retirement of Masakiyo. On December 16, he was appointed to the rank of Jushinoge (Junior Fifth Rank, Lower Grade) and Shusui Sho (Master of the Water Office). On September 10, 1863, during the third year of the Bunkyu era, he became the head of the O-Bancho (chief of the shogunate's guards). He resigned from this position on October 24, 1865, the first year of the Keiō era. On March 16, 1868, he went to Kyoto. On June 24, 1869, he became the jodai (chief retainer) of the domain. On November 18 of the same year, he retired and passed on the position to his adopted son, Masayoshi.

He died on January 31, 1891, at the age of 63.

== See also ==
- List of han
- Abolition of the han system
- Tannan Domain
