= Danbara Kofun =

Ancient tomb in Japan

Coordinates: 35.18639°N 136.89857°E

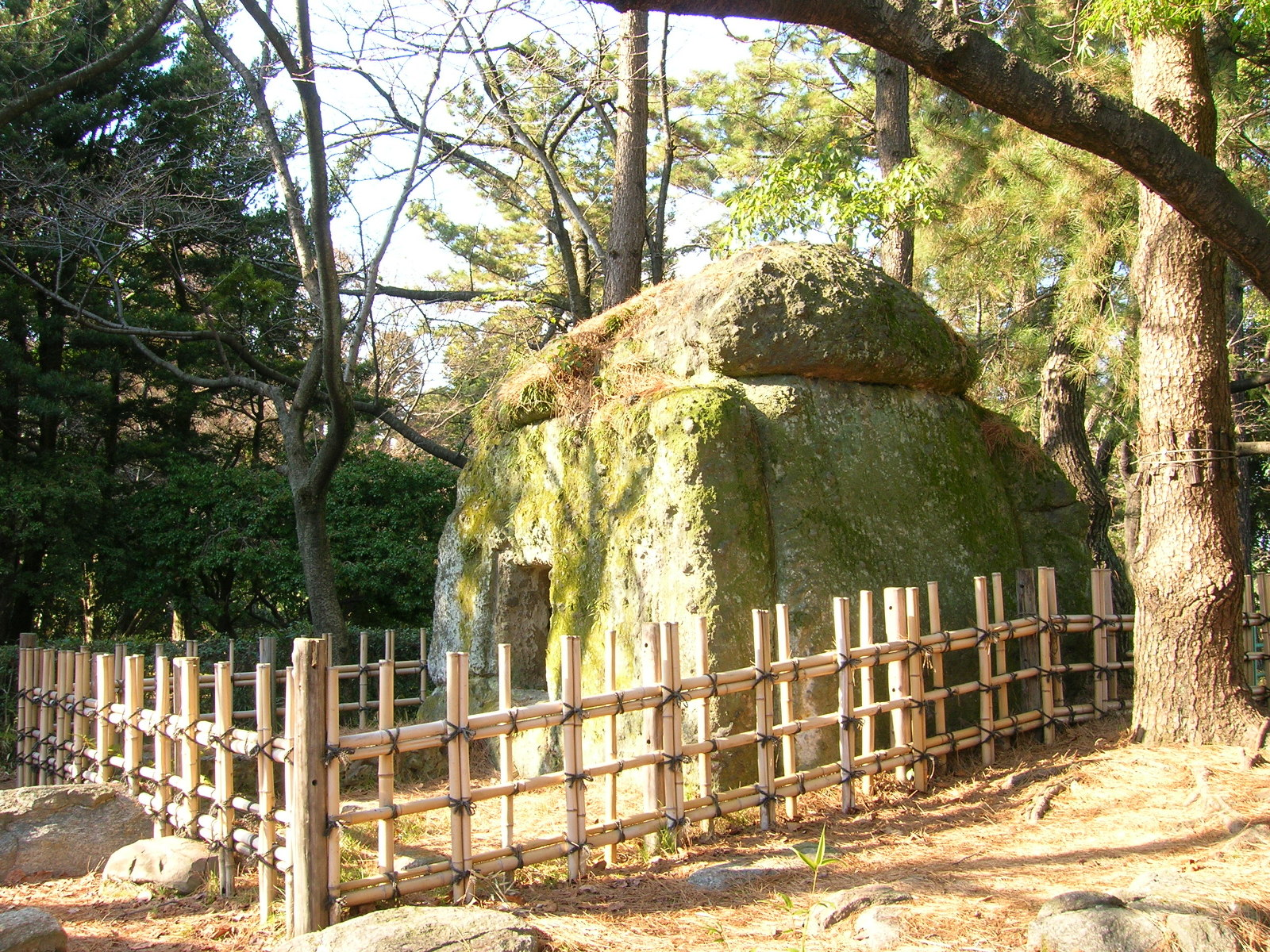
Danbara Kofun

The Danbara Kofun (団原古墳) is an ancient stone tomb in the grounds of Nagoya Castle in central Japan.

== History ==
The tomb is a Japanese kofun, consisting of an empty stone chamber where someone originally was laid to rest. The chamber consists of roughly hewn, large slabs of stone, pieced together and capped with a heavy stone roof. The entrance to the chamber was chiseled into the rock.

The kofun is located on the grounds of the Ofukemaru of Nagoya Castle. In 1988, experts were able to determine that the tomb likely originated from what is today Shimane Prefecture, or ancient Izumo Province. However, the exact original location of the tomb cannot be confirmed, since most of the areas in question are today used for agriculture. Shimane Prefecture is about 500 kilometres to the west of Nagoya. How and when the tomb was transported to Nagoya Castle, and for what purpose remains unknown. It is speculated that the tomb may have been reused as a storage chamber, however that remains unconfirmed.
