= Tannan Domain =

Tannan Domain 丹南藩
- under Tokugawa shogunate Japan
- 1623–1871
- Capital: Tannan jin'ya
- Area
  - Coordinates: 34°33′33.7″N 135°33′23.0″E
  - Type: Daimyō
- Historical era: Edo period
  - Established: 1623
  - Disestablished: 1871
- Today part of: part of Osaka Prefecture

Location of Tannan jin'ya
Tannan Domain (Japan)

Tannan Domain (丹南藩, Tannan-han) was a feudal domain under the Tokugawa shogunate of Edo period Japan, located in Kawachi Province in what is now the southeastern portion of modern-day Osaka Prefecture. It was centered around Tannan jin'ya in what is now the city of Matsubara and was controlled by the fudai daimyō Takagi clan all of its history.

== History ==
Takagi Masatsugu was the son of Takagi Kiyohide, one of Tokugawa Ieyasu's 16 Generals. With holdings of 9000 koku scattered across Sagami, Musashi, Kazusa, Shimōsa, and Ōmi Province, he was ranked as a hatamoto. In 1623, he was appointed to the post of Osaka jōban (大坂定番), a minor post which was responsible for guarding the Kyōbashiguchi and Tamazoguchi gates of Osaka Castle for which he received an additional 1000 koku in revenue. This placed his kokudaka over the 10,000 koku mark requited to qualify as a daimyō, and his holdings were consolidated to 22 village in Kawachi Province, where he constructed a jin'ya.

His son, Takagi Masanari acquired an additional 3000 koku in Kazusa and Awa Provinces, but the 3rd daimyō, Takagi Masahiro distributed 1500 koku each to his two younger brothers. During the tenure of the 6th daimyō, Takagi Masanobu, the domain received an exemption from the sankin kōtai requirement to travel to Edo on alternative years to attend the Shogun's court. Instead, the daimyō of the domain resided permanently in Edo, and managed the domain's affairs though a daikan and other officials. In 1769, under the 8th daimyō, Takagi Masanori, a widespread peasant's revolt occurred in the domain which resulted in22 village headmen being summoned to the domain's Edo residence. As a result, the Shogunate blamed Masanori for mismanagement and banned him from entering Edo Castle. During the Bakumatsu period, the 12th daimyō, Takagi Masahiro was ordered to dispatch troops in 1866 to suppress a revolt which had arisen in tenryō territory in what is now Kashiwara. The clan's finances, which had been in arrears since the mid-Edo period were close to collapse, with debts exceeding 39,000 ryō. In 1868, the han school, "Tannan Gakkō" was opened. The final daimyō, Takagi Masayoshi, served as imperial governor until the abolition of the han system in 1871. He was ennobled with the kazoku peerage title of viscount (shishaku) in 1884.

The site of the jin'ya became a field of private land in 1921 and there now no trace left. An archaeological excavation in 1999 confirmed the foundations of the jin'ya and the han school.

== Holdings at the end of the Edo period ==
As with most domains in the han system, Tannan Domain consisted of several discontinuous territories calculated to provide the assigned kokudaka, based on periodic cadastral surveys and projected agricultural yields.

- Kawachi Province
  - 2 villages in Shiki District
  - 12 villages in Tannan District
  - 6 villages in Tanboku District
- Shimotsuke Province
  - 4 villages in Ashikaga District

== List of daimyō ==
#	Name	Tenure	Courtesy title	Court Rank	kokudaka
Takagi clan, 1623-1871 (fudai)
1	Takagi Masatsugu (高木正次)	1623 - 1631	Mondo-no-sho (主水正)	Junior 5th Rank, Lower Grade (従五位下)	10,000 koku
2	Takagi Masanari (高木正成)	1631 - 1635	Mondo-no-sho (主水正)	Junior 5th Rank, Lower Grade (従五位下)	10,000 koku
3	Takagi Masahiro (高木正弘)	1635 - 1658	Mondo-no-sho (主水正)	Junior 5th Rank, Lower Grade (従五位下)	10,000 koku
4	Takagi Masamori (高木正盛)	1658 - 1670	Mondo-no-sho (主水正)	Junior 5th Rank, Lower Grade (従五位下)	10,000 koku
5	Takagi Masatoyo (高木正豊)	1670 - 1681	Buzen-no-kami (肥前守)	Junior 5th Rank, Lower Grade (従五位下)	10,000 koku
6	Takagi Masanobu (高木正陳)	1681 - 1741	Mondo-no-sho (主水正)	Junior 5th Rank, Lower Grade (従五位下)	10,000 koku
7	Takagi Masatsune (高木正恒)	1741 - 1743	Wakasa-no-kami (若狭守)	Junior 5th Rank, Lower Grade (従五位下)	10,000 koku
8	Takagi Masanori (高木正弼)	1743 - 1780	Mondo-no-sho (主水正)	Junior 5th Rank, Lower Grade (従五位下)	10,000 koku
9	Takagi Masanao (高木正直)	1780 - 1781	Mondo-no-sho (主水正)	Junior 5th Rank, Lower Grade (従五位下)	10,000 koku
10	Takagi Masakata (高木正剛)	1781 - 1826	Mondo-no-sho (主水正)	Junior 5th Rank, Lower Grade (従五位下)	10,000 koku
11	Takagi Masaakira (高木正明)	1826 - 1848	Mondo-no-sho (主水正)	Junior 5th Rank, Lower Grade (従五位下)	10,000 koku
12	Takagi Masahira (高木正坦)	1848 - 1869	Mondo-no-sho (主水正)	Junior 5th Rank, Lower Grade (従五位下)	10,000 koku
13	Takagi Masayoshi (高木正善)	1869 - 1871	Buzen-no-kami (肥前守)	Junior 5th Rank, Lower Grade (従五位下)	10,000 koku

== See also ==
- Abolition of the han system
- List of Han
