= Horio Tadauji =

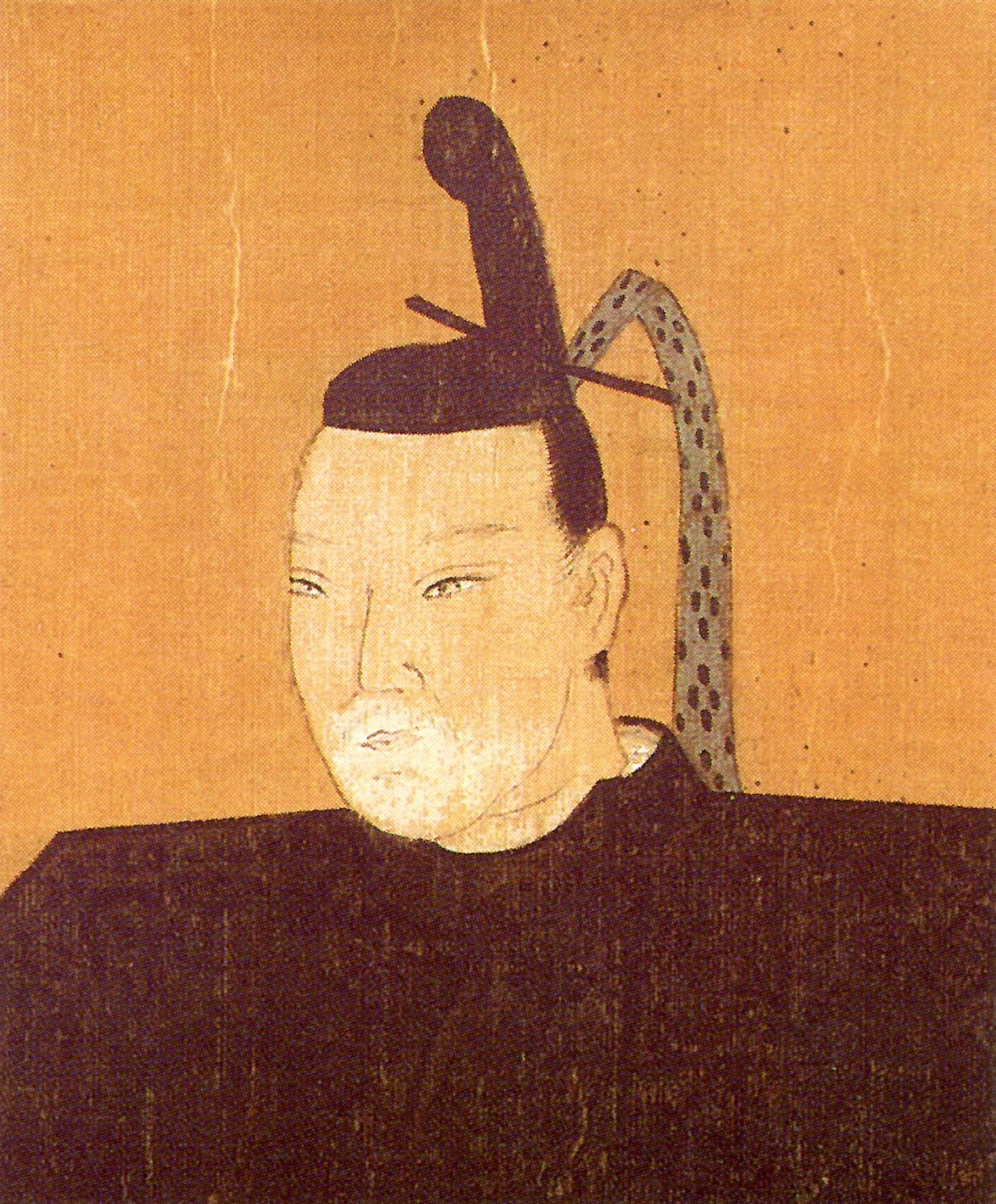
Horio Tadauji

Horio Tadauji (堀尾 忠氏; 1578 – August 8, 1604) was a tozama daimyō in the Azuchi–Momoyama and Edo period. His father was Horio Yoshiharu. He was the second leader of the Matsue clan.

In 1600 at the Battle of Sekigahara, acting as a substitute for Yoshiharu who had been injured in the run up to the battle, Tadauji took part in Tokugawa Ieyasu's force. After the battle, Ieyasu praised Tadauji for his credit and added his domain to 240,000 koku at Izumo Province.

In 1604, Tadauji died young from a disease before his father Horio Yoshiharu. Tadauji's son, Horio Tadaharu succeeded him as the head of the house. Tadaharu was so young (9 years old), that later Yoshiharu ruled as a godfather until his own death in 1611.

Preceded by Horio Yoshiharu	Daimyō of Matsue	Succeeded by Horio Tadaharu
