= Ogawa Domain =

Feudal domain of Japan from 1601 to 1606

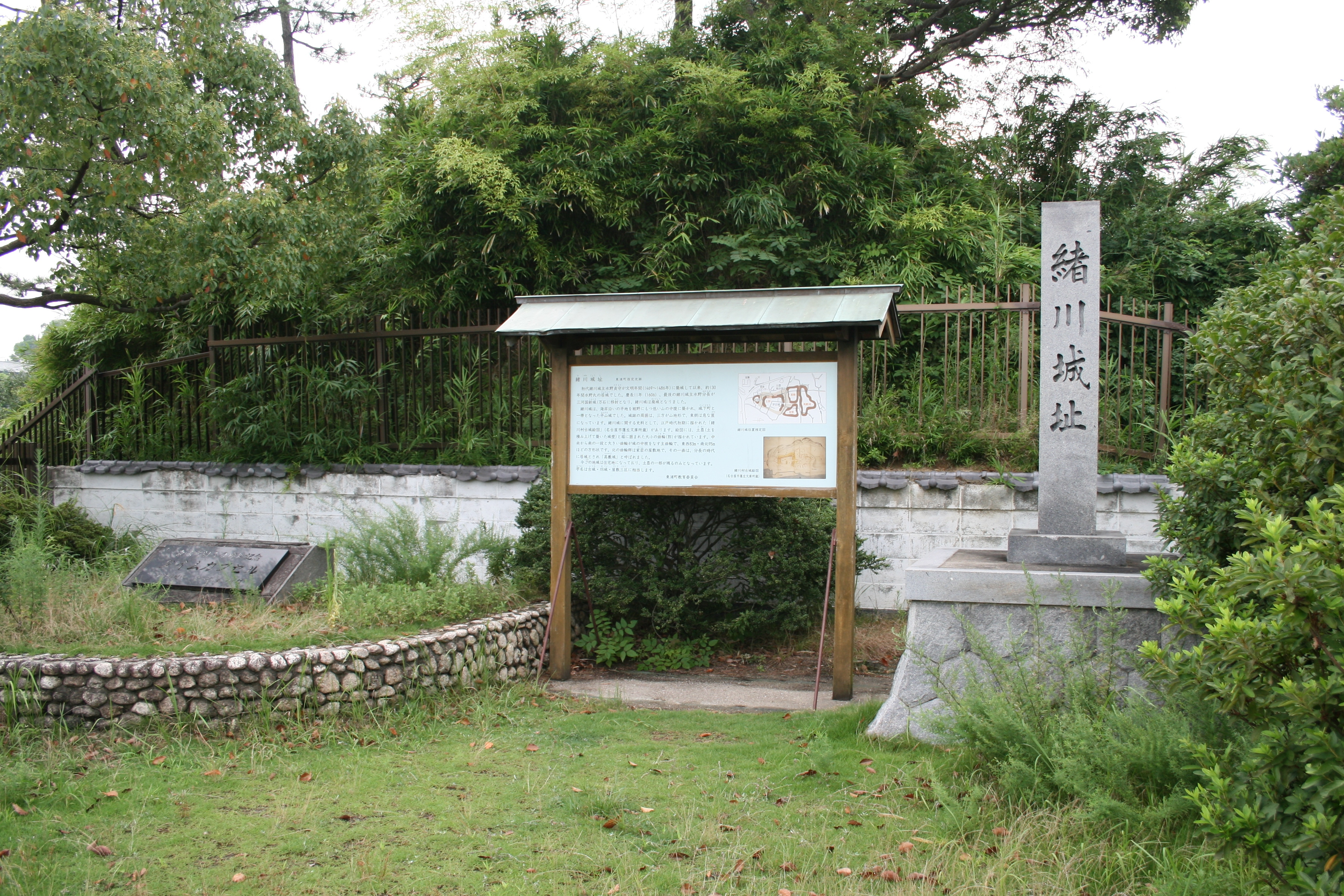
Marker for Ogawa Castle

The Ogawa Domain (緒川藩, Ogawa-han) was a short-lived feudal domain in Owari Province, Japan from 1601 to 1606. Historically, "Ogawa" has also been written as 小川 and 小河. The area was controlled by Mizuno Wakenaga, the cousin of Tokugawa Ieyasu and the main base of the domain was Ogawa Castle.

== History ==
The area was under control of the Mizuno clan since the 15th century. During the Battle of Sekigahara in the Sengoku period, Mizuno Nobumoto, Mizuno Tadamori, and Mizuno Tadashige all fought under the banner of Tokugawa Ieyasu. In 1601, because of the support of the Mizuno clan, Mizuno Wakenaga, was given control of the Ogawa Domain, which produced 9,820 koku. Although domains in this period had a minimum of 10,000 koku, some have suggested that there were no clear border between a Daimyo and a Hatamoto back in early Edo period. In 1606, Wakenaga was transferred to the Shinshiro Domain, which produced 10,000 koku. The Ogawa Domain was merged with the Owari Domain following his transfer.

== Leaders ==
Crest of the Mizuno clan

Mizuno clan

1. Mizuno Wakenaga

== See also ==
- Han system
- List of Han
