= Matsue Castle =

Castle in Shimane Prefecture, Japan

- 松江城
- Matsue, Shimane Prefecture, Japan
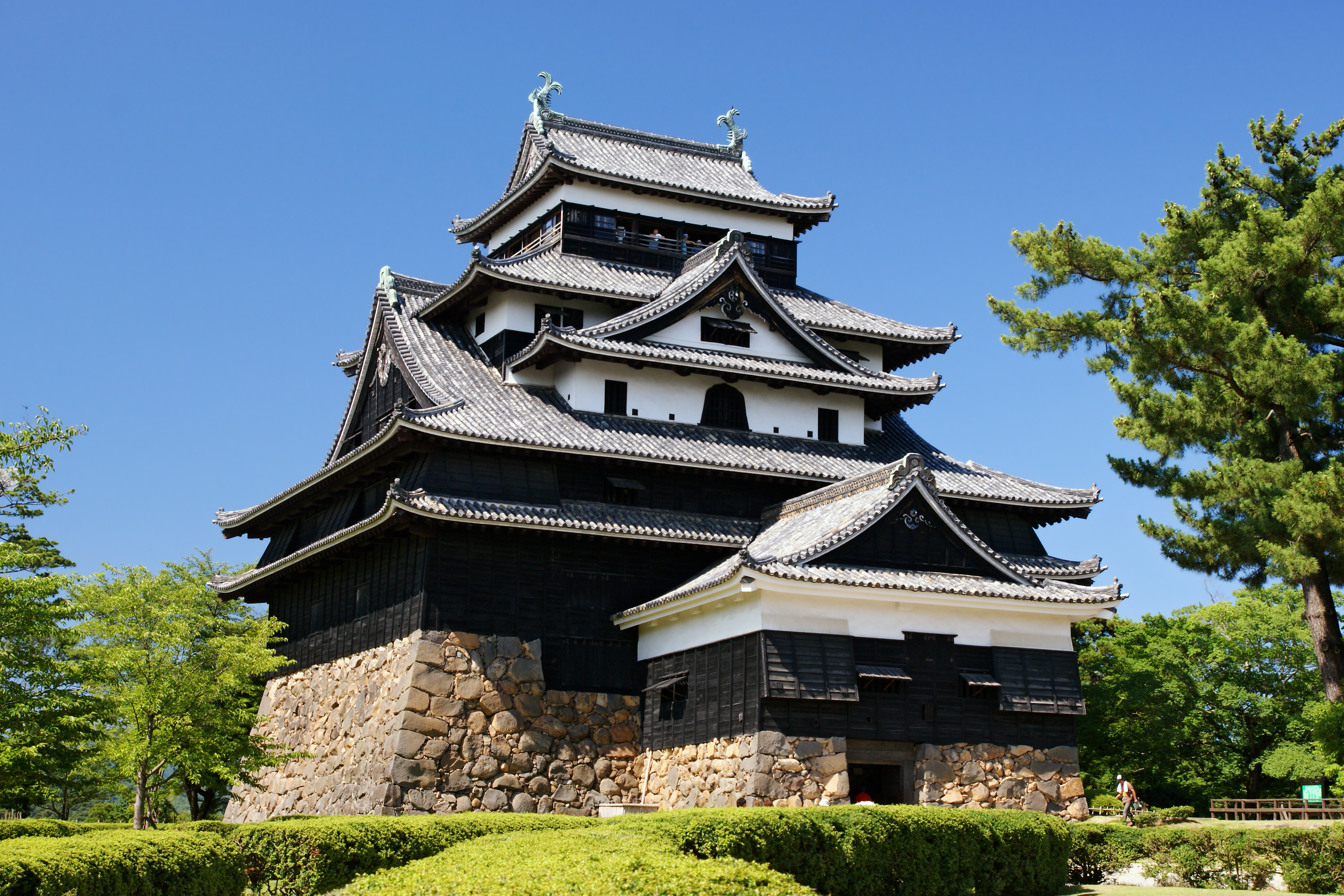
- The keep of Matsue Castle in 2008

Site information
- Type: Japanese castle
- Controlled by: Horio clan (1611–1633); Kyōgoku clan (1633–1637); Matsudaira clan (1637–1927); City of Matsue (1927–present)

Location
- Coordinates: 35°28′30″N 133°03′02″E
- Height: 30 metres

Site history
- Built: 1607–1611; 415 years ago
- Built by: Horio Yoshiharu

Matsue Castle (松江城, Matsue-jō) is a Japanese castle located in Matsue, Shimane Prefecture.

Matsue Castle was constructed from 1607 to 1611 by Horio Yoshiharu, the first daimyō of the Matsue Domain, during the early Edo period. Ownership was passed to the Izumo branch of the Kyōgoku in 1633 and then the Matsudaira, a junior branch of the ruling Tokugawa clan, in 1637. The Matsudaira donated Matsue Castle to the city of Matsue in 1927.

Matsue Castle is one of few remaining feudal Japanese castles that retains its main keep in its original wooden form and not a modern concrete reconstruction. Built after the last great war of feudal Japan, the keep has survived earthquakes, fires, wars and other causes that destroyed or damaged many Japanese castles. However, a number of its castle buildings were demolished during the early Meiji period, leaving only the keep, an attached turret and stone walls existing as original structures today, though some of the other castle buildings have been reconstructed in modern times. Matsue Castle, standing on the shores of Lake Shinji, is one of Japan's Three Great Lake Castles and the heart of Matsue's central riverside district.

Matsue Castle outside and inside, 2019

== History ==
Of the 100+ castles remaining in Japan, Matsue Castle is the only one with a surviving main keep in the San'in region. This keep is the second largest, the third tallest (30m) and the sixth oldest amongst Japanese castles. It was built over a period of 5 years by the daimyō of the Izumo region, Horio Yoshiharu, and was completed in 1611.

After the reigns of Horio Tadaharu and Kyōgoku Tadataka, Matsudaira Naomasa, a grandson of Tokugawa Ieyasu, became Lord of the castle, after being transferred from Matsumoto in Shinano Province, and thus began a reign that lasted 10 generations of the Matsudaira clan over a period of 234 years.

In 1875, all of the buildings within the castle were dismantled, with the exception of the castle tower itself and attached turret, which were allowed to remain due to pressure from interest groups. These buildings underwent a complete renovation between 1950 and 1955. In 2001, several of the castle's former turrets were reconstructed.

The keep is a complex structure, built in a watchtower-style, that appears to be five stories from the outside, but has, in fact, six levels inside. Most of the walls of the keep are painted black. It is a strong structure, built to withstand warfare, yet at the same time, it is majestic and solemn, reminiscent of the Momoyama style.

The tenshu and attached turret of Matsue Castle have been registered as a national treasure of Japan since July 9, 2015.

== Gallery ==
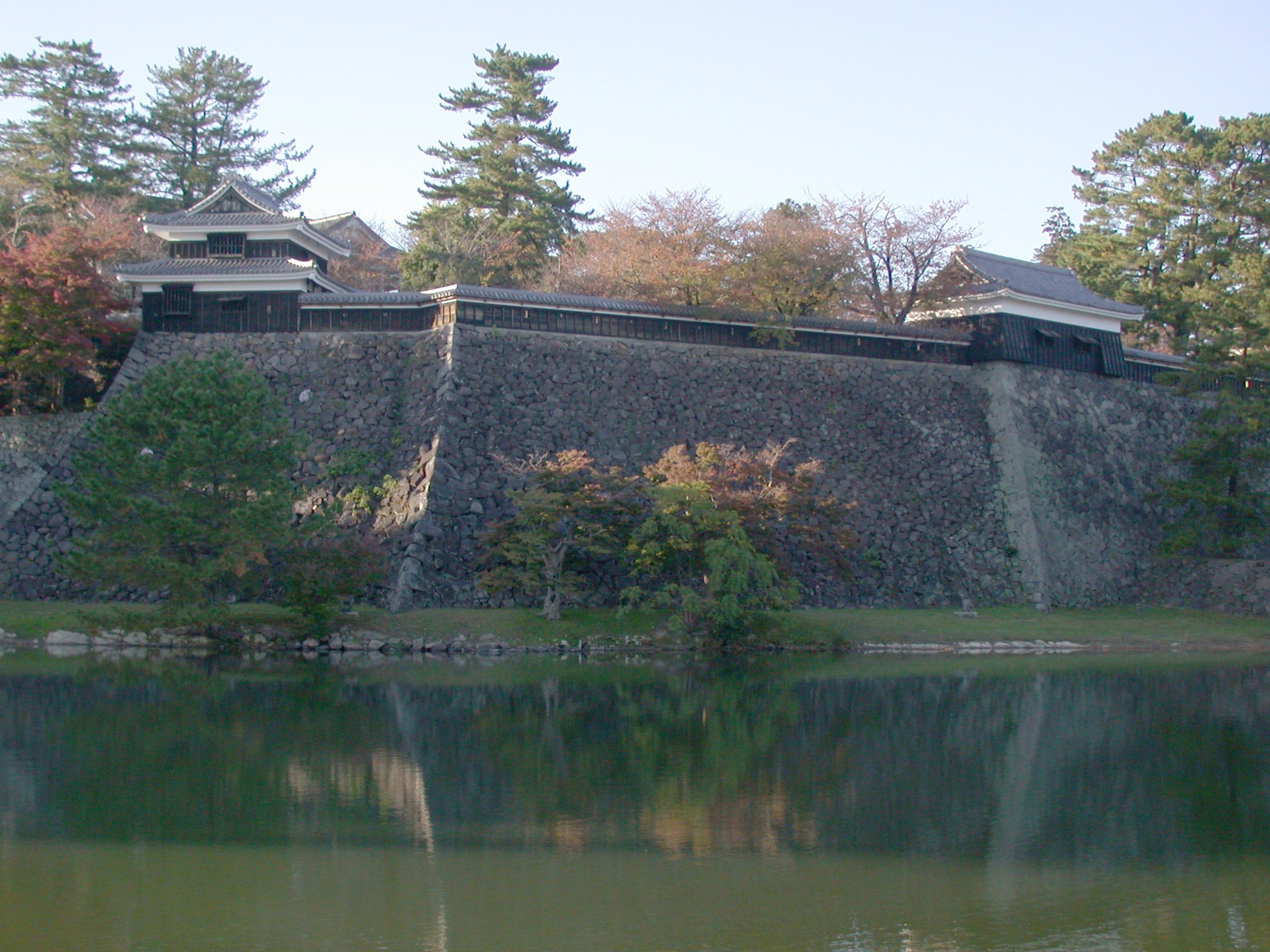
Ninomaru

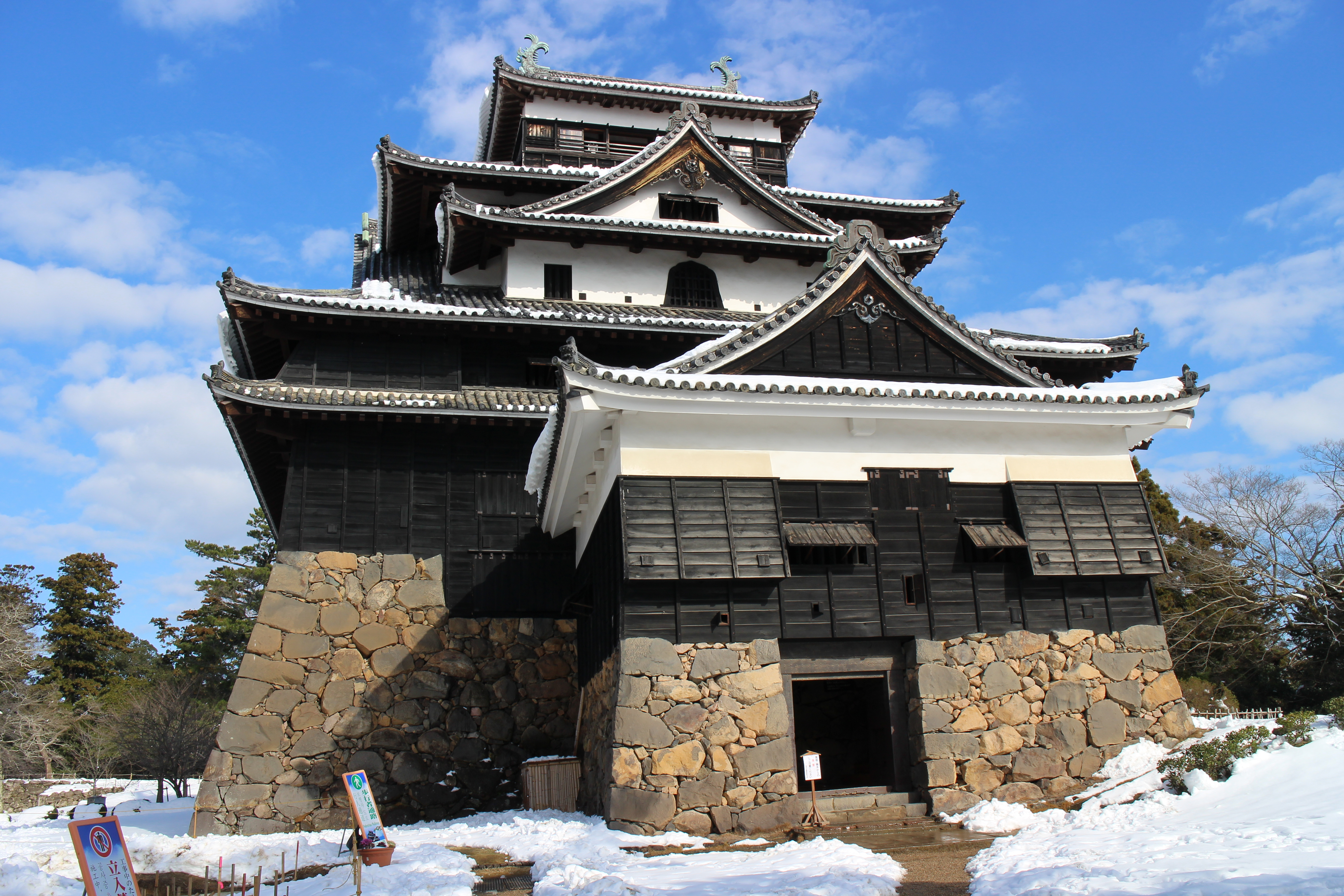
Matsue Castle Keep Tower in the snow, 2017

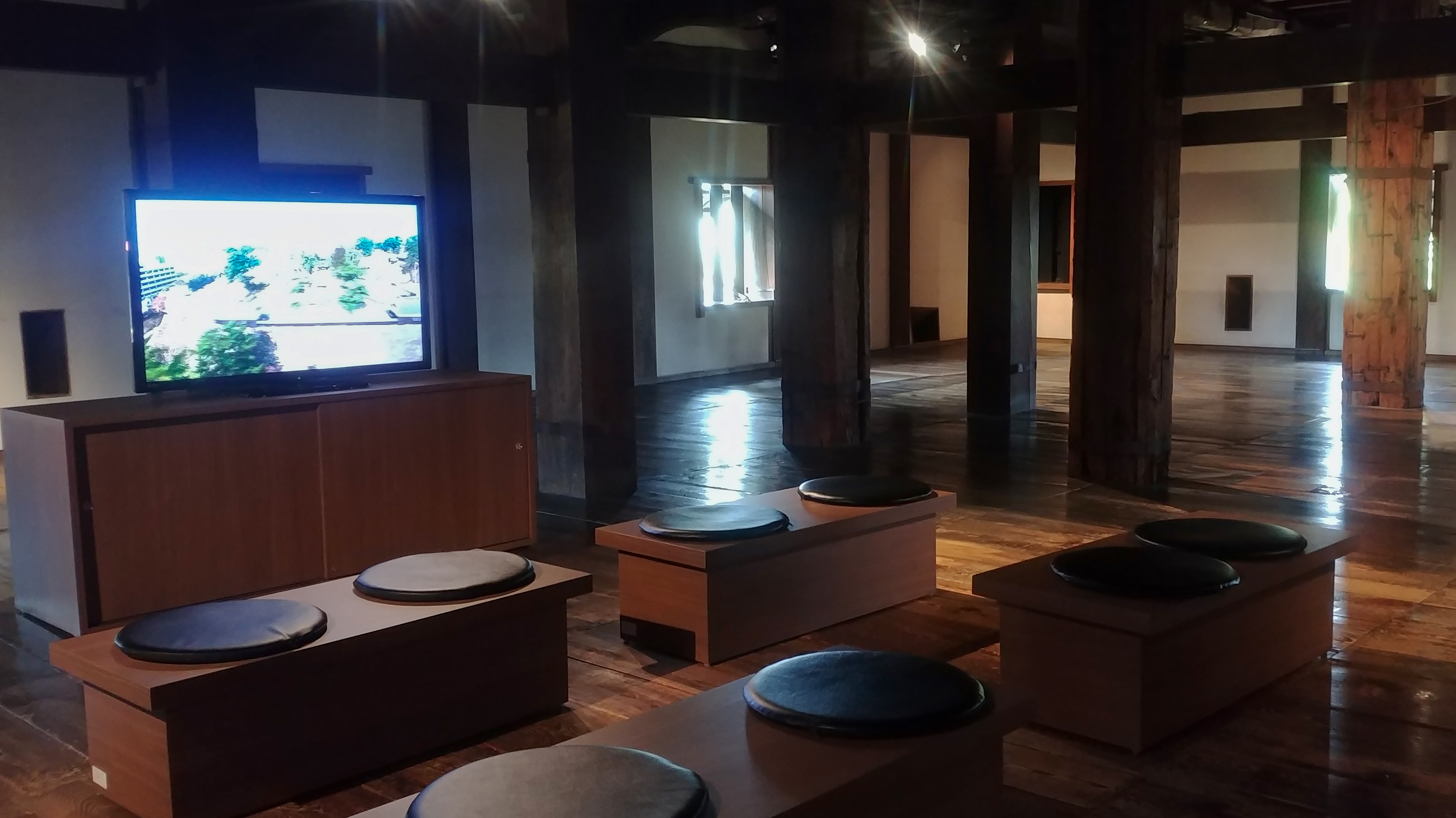
Castle interior

== Literature ==
- Benesch, Oleg and Ran Zwigenberg (2019). Japan's Castles: Citadels of Modernity in War and Peace. Cambridge: Cambridge University Press. p. 374. ISBN 9781108481946.
- De Lange, William (2021). An Encyclopedia of Japanese Castles. Groningen: Toyo Press. pp. 600 pages. ISBN 978-9492722300.
- Schmorleitz, Morton S. (1974). Castles in Japan. Tokyo: Charles E. Tuttle Co. ISBN 0-8048-1102-4.
- Motoo, Hinago (1986). Japanese Castles. Tokyo: Kodansha. p. 200 pages. ISBN 0-87011-766-1.
- Mitchelhill, Jennifer (2013). Castles of the Samurai:Power & Beauty. USA: Kodansha. ISBN 978-1568365121.
