= Asada Domain =

Administrative division in western Japan during the Edo period (1600-1871)

Asada Domain 麻田藩
- Domain of Japan
- 1615–1871
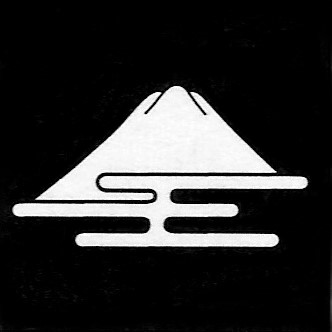
- Mon of the Aoki clan
- Capital: Asada jin'ya
- Area
  - Coordinates: 34°47′38.41″N 135°26′55.01″E
- Historical era: Edo period
  - Established: 1615
  - Abolition of the han system: 1871
- Contained within
  - Province: Settsu Province
- Today part of: Osaka Prefecture

Location of Asada jin'ya
Asada Domain (Japan)

Aoki Shigeyoshi, final daimyo of Tsuyama

Asada Domain (麻田藩, Asada-han) was a feudal domain under the Tokugawa shogunate of Edo period Japan, in what is now northern Osaka Prefecture. It was located in Teshima and Kawabe Districts of Settsu Province and was centered around Asada jin'ya in what is now part of the city of Toyonaka, Osaka. It was ruled in its entire history by a branch of the Aoki clan. The Asada Domain was dissolved in the abolition of the han system in 1871 and is now part of Okayama Prefecture.

== History ==
Asada Domain was founded by Aoki Kazushige, whose father Aoki Shigenao had served as a vassal of Toki Yorinari, the shugo of Mino Province in the Sengoku period. Aoki Kazushige later went into the service of the Imagawa clan, and after the Battle of Okehazama, entered the service of Tokugawa Ieyasu. After this younger brother died at the Battle of Shizugatake, he ran away from the Tokugawa clan and became a vassal of Nawa Nagahide instead. He entered the service of Toyotomi Hideyoshi on Nawa Nagahide's death. During the Siege of Osaka in 1614, he was sent by Toyotomi Hideyori as a messenger to Sunpu for peace negotiations, but was detained in Kyoto and made a prisoner of war. However, after the success of Tokugawa forces over the Toyotomi clan, he was awarded with territories in Settsu, Bitchū and Iyo Province with a kokudaka of 14,000 koku and made a daimyō. The domain remained under the rule of the Aoki clan until the Meiji era; however, it was reduced to 12,000 koku in 1617 when Aoki Kazushige established his younger brother Aoki Kanao as a 2000 koku hatamoto and head of a cadet branch of the clan. In 1619, he adopted Kanao's son Shigekane as his successor. In 1926, the territories of the domain Iyo were traded for territories in Settsu to consolidated the domain's holdings. Shigekane had only a daughter, so he adopted a son of the Sakai clan as his heir. Aoki Shigemasa was close confidant of Shogun Tokugawa Tsunayoshi, and before his death in 1693, the Shogun despatched his person physician as a mark of favor.

In the mid-Edo period, but the clan's finances were in difficulties due to the construction of the Ōbaku School temple of Bussunichi-ji Temple during the Kanbun era. Measures encouraging the production of sake and oil as clan monopolies, and issuing han bills were ineffective. Following the Meiji restoration, Asada Domain became "Asada Prefecture" with the abolition of the han system in 1871, and was subsequently incorporated into Osaka Prefecture. The Aoki clan was awarded the rank of viscount (shishaku) in the kazoku peerage in 1884.

The site of the jin'ya was the former Hotarugaike Public Hall on the west side of Hankyu Takarazuka Main Line Hotarugaike Station. It is designated as a Toyonaka city historic site, but there is no remnant of the former structure, and a stone monument has been erected in one corner of the site public hall.

== Holdings at the end of the Edo period ==
As with most domains in the han system, Asada Domain consisted of several discontinuous territories calculated to provide the assigned kokudaka, based on periodic cadastral surveys and projected agricultural yields, g.

- Settsu Province
  - 15 villages in Teshima District
  - 13 villages in Kawabe District
- Bitchū Province
  - 2 villages in Oda District
  - 6 villages in Shitsuki District
  - 3 villages in Asakuchi District

== List of daimyō ==
#	Name	Tenure	Courtesy title	Court Rank	kokudaka
Aoki clan, 1615-1871 (Tozama)
1	Aoki Kazushige (青木一重)	1614 - 1619	Minbu-shōfu (民部少輔)	Junior 5th Rank, Lower Grade (従五位下)	14,000 ->12,000 koku
2	Aoki Shigekane (青木重兼)	1619 - 1672	Kai-no-kami (甲斐守)	Junior 5th Rank, Lower Grade (従五位下)	12,000 koku
3	Aoki Shigemasa (青木重正)	1672 - 1693	Kai-no-kami (甲斐守)	Junior 5th Rank, Lower Grade (従五位下)	12,000 koku
4	Aoki Shigenori (青木重矩)	1693 - 1713	Kai-no-kami (甲斐守)	Junior 5th Rank, Lower Grade (従五位下)	12,000 koku
5	Aoki Kazutsune (青木一典)	1713 - 1736	Kai-no-kami (甲斐守)	Junior 5th Rank, Lower Grade (従五位下)	12,000 koku
6	Aoki Kazukuni (青木一都)	1736 - 1749	Dewa-no-kami (出羽守)	Junior 5th Rank, Lower Grade (従五位下)	12,000 koku
7	Aoki Chikatsune (青木見典)	1749 - 1754	Naizen-no-kami (内膳正)	Junior 5th Rank, Lower Grade (従五位下)	12,000 koku
8	Aoki Kazuyoshi (青木一新)	1754 - 1770	Mimasaka-no-kami (美濃守)	Junior 5th Rank, Lower Grade (従五位下)	12,000 koku
9	Aoki Kazutsura (青木一貫)	1770 - 1786	Kai-no-kami (甲斐守)	Junior 5th Rank, Lower Grade (従五位下)	12,000 koku
10	Aoki Kazusada (青木一貞)	1786 - 1821	Kai-no-kami (甲斐守)	Junior 5th Rank, Lower Grade (従五位下)	12,000 koku
11	Aoki Shigetatsu (青木重龍)	1821 - 1847	Suruga-no-kami (駿河守)	Junior 5th Rank, Lower Grade (従五位下)	12,000 koku
12	Aoki Kazuoki (青木一興)	1847 - 1849	Mino-no-kami (美濃守)	Junior 5th Rank, Lower Grade (従五位下)	12,000 koku
13	Aoki Kazuhiro (青木一咸)	1849 - 1856	Kai-no-kami (甲斐守)	Junior 5th Rank, Lower Grade (従五位下)	12,000 koku
14	Aoki Kazuyoshi (青木重義)	1856 - 1871	Minbu-shōfu (民部少輔)	Junior 5th Rank, Lower Grade (従五位下)	12,000 koku

== See also ==
- List of Han
- Abolition of the han system
