= Aoki clan =

Japanese clan

Aoki 青木
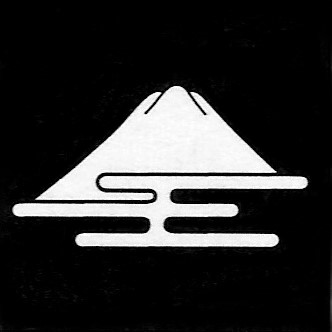
- The emblem (mon) of the Aoki clan
- Home province: Musashi
- Final ruler: Aoki Shigeyoshi
- Current head: Aoki Jun’ichi
- Dissolution: still extant
- Ruled until: 1871 (abolition of the han system)

The first who used Aoki name was Aoki Shigenao (1529–1614). Aoki Shigenao was a vassal to one of Oda Nobunaga's principal advisors, Niwa Nagahide.

During the Sengoku period, the Aoki clan served Toyotomi clan later after the death of Toyotomi Hideyoshi, they served Tokugawa Shogunate and ruled Asada Domain, 12.000 koku.

== Heads of family ==
1. Aoki Kazushige (1551–1628), son of Shigenao
2. Aoki Shigekane (1607–1682)
3. Aoki Shigemasa (1625–1693)
4. Aoki Shigenori (1665–1729)
5. Aoki Kazutsune (1697–1736)
6. Aoki Kazukuni (1721–1749)
7. Aoki Chikatsune
8. Aoki Kazuyoshi (1728–1781)
9. Aoki Kazutsura (1734–1786)
10. Aoki Kazusada (1776–1831)
11. Aoki Shigetatsu (1800–1858)
12. Aoki Kazuoki
13. Aoki Kazuhiro (1828–1856)
14. Aoki Shigeyoshi (1853–1884)
15. Aoki Nobumitsu (1869–1949)
16. Aoki Nobutake
17. Aoki Jun’ichi (b.1935)
18. Aoki Mugen (2009)
