= Mori Domain (Izumo) =

Domain of Japan (1666–1871)

Mori Domain 母里藩
- Domain of Japan
- 1666–1871
- Capital: Mori jin'ya
  - Type: Daimyō
- Historical era: Edo period
  - Established: 1666
  - Disestablished: 1871
- Today part of: Shimane Prefecture

Mori Domain (母里藩, Mori-han) was a Japanese domain of the Edo period. It was associated with Izumo Province in modern-day Shimane Prefecture.

In the han system, Mori was a political and economic abstraction based on periodic cadastral surveys and projected agricultural yields. In other words, the domain was defined in terms of kokudaka, not land area. This was different from the feudalism of the West.

== History ==
The domain was ruled for the entirety of its history by a branch of the Matsudaira clan of Fukui.

== List of daimyōs ==
The hereditary daimyōs were head of the clan and head of the domain.

- Matsudaira clan, 1677–1871 (shinpan; 10,000 koku)
1. Takamasa
2. Naotaka
3. Naokazu
4. Naomichi
5. Naoyuki
6. Naokiyo
7. Naokata
8. Naooki
9. Naoyori
10. Naotoshi

== See also ==
- List of Han
- Abolition of the han system
