= Hirose Domain =

Hirose Domain 広瀬藩
- Domain of Japan
- 1666–1871
- Capital: Hirose jin'ya
  - Type: Daimyō
- Historical era: Edo period
  - Established: 1666
  - Disestablished: 1871
- Today part of: Shimane Prefecture

Hirose Domain (広瀬藩, Hirose-han) was a Japanese domain of the Edo period. It was associated with Izumo Province in modern-day Shimane Prefecture.

In the han system, Hirose was a political and economic abstraction based on periodic cadastral surveys and projected agricultural yields. In other words, the domain was defined in terms of kokudaka, not land area. This was different from the feudalism of the West.

== List of daimyōs ==
The hereditary daimyōs were head of the clan and head of the domain.

- Matsudaira clan, 1666–1868 (fudai; 30,000 koku)

== See also ==
- List of Han
- Abolition of the han system
