= Tsurumaki (surname) =

Tsurumaki (written: 鶴巻 or 弦巻) is a Japanese surname. Notable people with the surname include:

- Kazuya Tsurumaki (鶴巻 和哉, born 1966), Japanese anime director
- Kento Tsurumaki (弦巻 健人, born 1987), Japanese footballer
- Marc Tsurumaki, American architect
- Nobuhiro Tsurumaki (鶴巻 伸洋, born 1971), Japanese mixed martial artist
