= Horio Tadaharu =

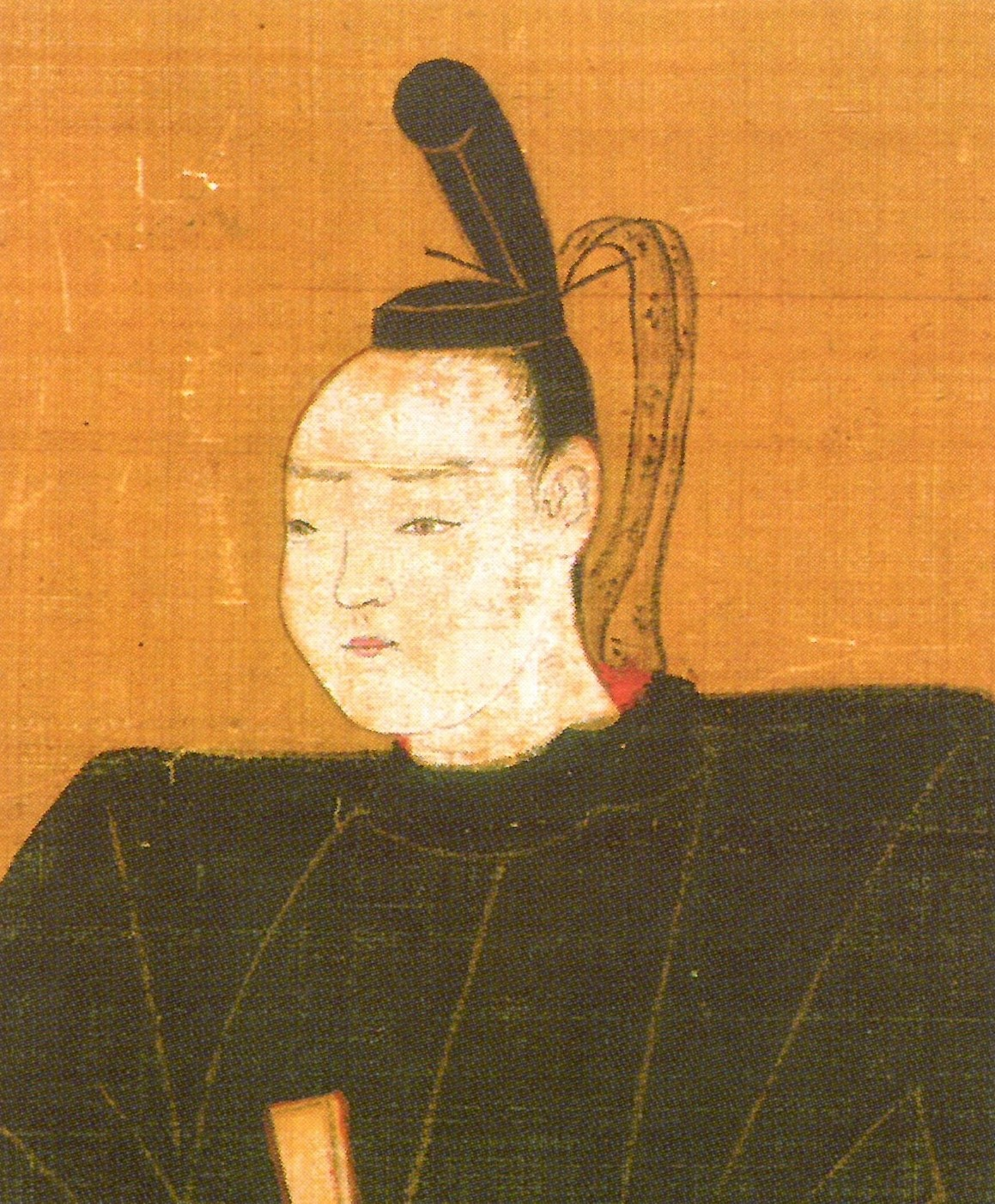

Horio Tadaharu (堀尾 忠晴; 1596 – 26 October 1633) was a tozama daimyō in Japan during the Edo period. His father was Horio Tadauji and his grandfather was Horio Yoshiharu. He was the third leader of the Matsue clan.

He married Binhime daughter of Okudaira Iemasa of Utsunomiya Domain and adopted daughter of Tokugawa Hidetada. They had 1 daughter married Ishikawa Kadokatsu.

In 1604, 9 year old Tadaharu succeeded to the leadership of his house on the early death of his father Tadauji; his grandfather acted as regent because of his youth. Between 1607 and 1611 he completed the construction of Matsue Castle.

In 1611, Yoshiharu died, and Tadaharu took up personal leadership.

In 1619, when the domain of Fukushima Masanori was seized, Tadaharu received Hiroshima Castle, which had belonged to Masanori.

In 1633, Tadaharu died. The main line of the Horio clan thus came to an end; however, a branch of the family became retainers of the Matsudaira clan over the Matsue Domain.

There is a wooden statue of Tadaharu at Enjō-ji Temple in Matsue.

Preceded by Horio Tadauji	Daimyō of Matsue; 1604–1633	Succeeded by Kyōgoku Tadataka
