= Horio Yoshiharu =

Japanese daimyō

- 堀尾 吉晴
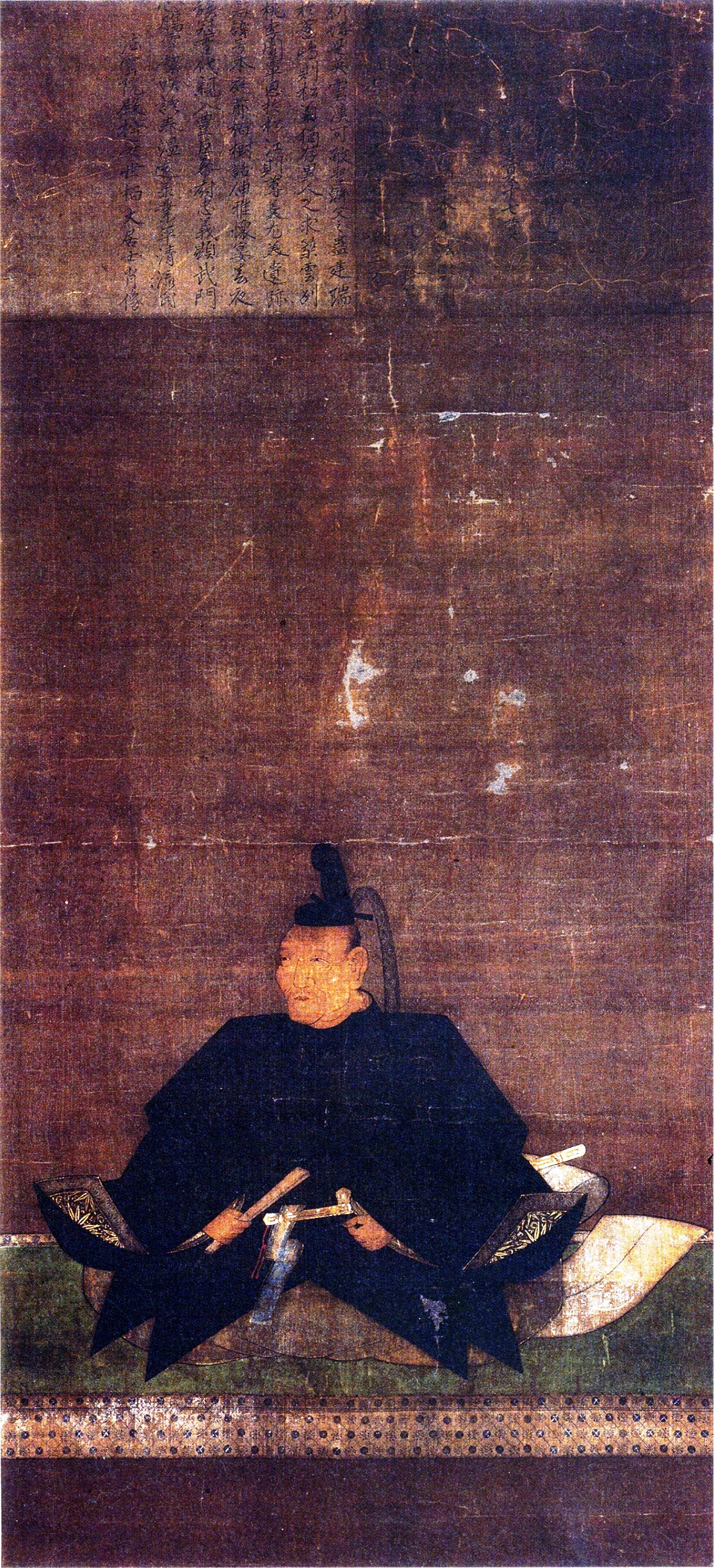

Head of Matsue clan
- In office 1590–1599
- Succeeded by: Horio Tadauji

Personal details
- Born: 1542 Ōguchi, Aichi Prefecture, Owari
- Died: July 26, 1611 (aged 68–69)
- Children: Horio Tadauji
- Nickname: "Mosuke"

Military service
- Allegiance: Oda clan Toyotomi clan Tokugawa clan Tokugawa shogunate
- Rank: Daimyo, chūrō
- Unit: Matsue clan
- Battles/wars: Siege of Inabayama; Battle of Tenmokuzan; Siege of Takamatsu; Battle of Yamazaki; Battle of Shizugatake; Toyama Campaign; Kyushu Campaign; Siege of Odawara

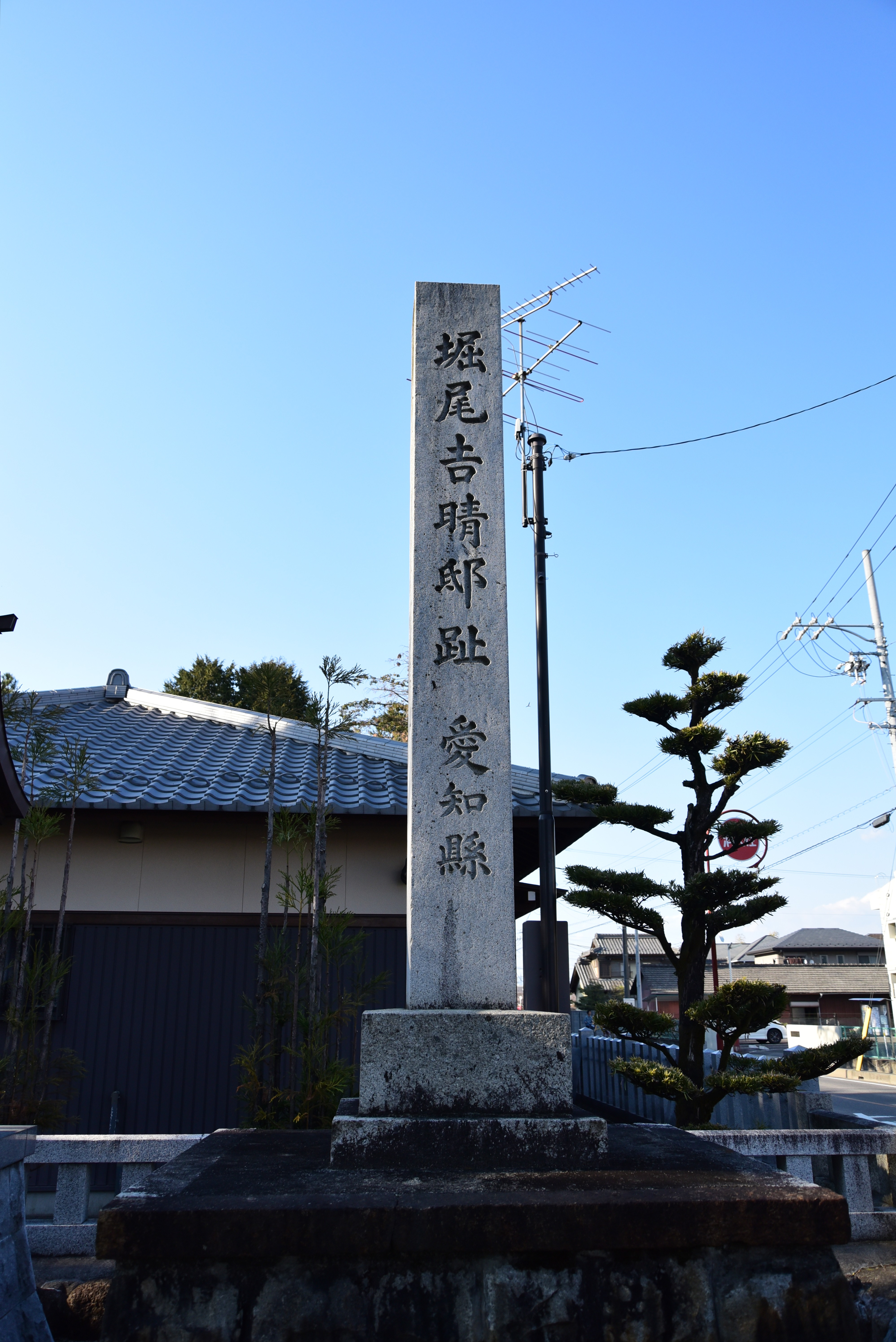
Horio Yoshiharu's birthplace monument(Ōguchi, Aichi Prefecture)

Horio Yoshiharu (堀尾 吉晴; 1542 – July 26, 1611) was a Japanese daimyō during the Azuchi–Momoyama and Edo periods. He was appointed to the position of one of san-chūrō (three arbiters) by Toyotomi Hideyoshi along with Ikoma Chikamasa and Nakamura Kazuuji. He was the first leader of the Matsue clan and also known as Horio Mosuke (堀尾 茂助).

== Military life ==
=== Service under Nobunaga ===
After seeing Yoshiharu wrestling a wild boar, Toyotomi Hideyoshi brought Yoshiharu into his service. Yoshiharu served Hashiba Hideyoshi (Toyotomi Hideyoshi) when Oda Nobunaga attacked Inabayama Castle in 1567.

In 1582, after the Battle of Tenmokuzan, he executed Oyamada Nobushige when Nobushige went to the Oda clan camp. When Hideyoshi attacked Bitchū Takamatsu Castle, Yoshiharu conducted an inquest into the death of Shimizu Muneharu.

=== Service under Hideyoshi ===
After the death of Nobunaga, He shone as a retainer of Hideyoshi. Horio killed Saito Toshikazu after he attempt to scroll past Hideyoshi's lines at the Battle of Yamazaki. He was involved in various battles such as the Battle of Shizugatake in 1583.

In 1585, Yoshiharu participated in the Toyama campaign against Sassa Narimasa. Also in 1587, in the Kyūshū Campaign and got the court title of Senior Fifth Rank (Lower) and Head of Security.

In 1590, Hideyoshi awarded him 120,000 koku at Hamamatsu, Tōtōmi Province because of the credit for the siege of Odawara. Horio Yoshiharu, Nakamura Kazuuji and Ikoma Chikamasa were appointed the three chūrō by Hideyoshi in his last years, and participated in the "Toyotomi administration".

=== Service under Ieyasu ===
In 1598, after the death of Hideyoshi, Yoshiharu switched his allegiance to Tokugawa Ieyasu.

In 1599, he transferred responsibility as head of the family to his son, Horio Tadauji, and was given 50,000 koku as a domain to live after retirement at Fuchu, Echizen Province.

In 1600, Yoshiharu took part in Ieyasu's force. He killed Kaganoi Shigemochi, who killed Mizuno Tadashige on August 27 at Chiryu, Mikawa Province, but was injured by Shigemochi. Because of that, he could not take part in the Battle of Sekigahara on October 21. However, Ieyasu gave him 240,000 koku at Toda, Izumo Province after the battle, because Yoshiharu had killed Shigemochi, and Yoshiharu son, Horio Tadauji, had substituted the performance of exploits at the battle on his behalf.

== Death ==
In 1604, Yoshiharu's son, Tadauji who had succeeded him as head of his house, died young, and his grandchild, Horio Tadaharu succeeded to a house. Tadaharu was so young (9 years old) that Yoshiharu ruled as a godfather until his own death on 1611. Yoshiharu was popular and was so calm that he was called Hotoke no Mosuke (仏の茂助), which means that Yoshiharu was a saint of a man.

The family temple of the Horio clan is Shunkō-in, in Hanazono, Ukyo District, Kyoto Prefecture.

Preceded by none	Daimyō of Matsue; 1590–1599	Succeeded by Horio Tadauji
