= Aoki Kazuoki =

Aoki Kazuoki (青木 一興, 1822 – 26 September 1849) was the 12th daimyō of Asada Domain in Settsu Province, Japan and a member of the Aoki clan.

Kazuoki was the sixth son of Aoki Kazusada, the 10th daimyō. In 1847 he succeeded his elder brother Shigetatsu, who abdicated. Kazuoki died on 26 September 1849 at age 28, having been daimyō for only two years.

His posthumous Buddhist name is 玄了院殿俊徳義勇大居士.

Preceded by Aoki Shigetatsu	Daimyō of Asada Domain; 1847–1849	Succeeded by Aoki Kazuhiro
