= Hōjō Domain =

Hōjō Domain (北条藩, Hōjō-han) was a Japanese domain of the Edo period, located in Awa Province (modern-day Chiba Prefecture), Japan. It was centered on what is now part of the modern city of Tateyama, Chiba.

In the han system, Hōjō was a political and economic abstraction based on periodic cadastral surveys and projected agricultural yields. In other words, the domain was defined in terms of kokudaka, not land area. This was different from the feudalism of the West.

== History ==
Hojo Domain was created in 1638 for Yashiro Tadamasa, the former karō to the ill-fated Tokugawa Tadanaga. On Tadanaga’s disgrace and execution, Yashiro Tadamasa had been arrested and relieved of his position and titles. However, in 1638, he was rehabilitated by Shōgun Tokugawa Iemitsu and allowed a minor 10,000 koku holding in southern Bōsō Peninsula under the watchful eyes of the neighboring Tateyama Domain.

However, during the time of his successor, Yashiro Tadataka, the domain’s finances were ruined and excessive taxation resulted in a widespread peasant’s rebellion in 1711, which was later known as the 10,000 Koku Rebellion (万石騒動, Mankoku Sodo). Outraged farmers seized control of the domain, and even attempted to storm Yashiro's Edo residence, and the rebellion was suppressed by force from the Tokugawa shogunate, leading to many executions. The Yashiro were then dispossessed from their domain and reduced to hatamoto status.

On October 18, 1725, the domain was revived for Mizuno Tadasada, a hatamoto, and the younger son of a hatamoto whose holding passed the 10,000 koku qualifying mark to become a daimyō. His descendants continued to rule the small domain until 1827, when Mizuno Tadateru transferred his residence to what is now part of Ichihara in neighboring Kazusa Province, and renamed to domain "Tsurumaki Domain".

== List of daimyōs ==
- Yashiro clan (fudai) 1638–1712

#	Name	Tenure	Courtesy title	Court Rank	revenues
1	Yashiro Tadamasa (屋代 忠正)	1638–1662	Etchu-no-kami	Lower 5th (従五位下)	10,000 koku
2	Yashiro Tadaoki (屋代 忠興)	1662–1663	Etchu-no-kami	Lower 5th (従五位下)	10,000 koku
2	Yashiro Tadataka (屋代 忠位)	1663–1712	Etchu-no-kami	Lower 5th (従五位下)	10,000 koku

- Mizuno clan (fudai) 1712–1871

#	Name	Tenure	Courtesy title	Court Rank	revenues
1	Mizuno Tadasada (水野 忠定)	1725–1748	Iki-no-kami	Lower 5th (従五位下)	12,000→15,000 koku
2	Mizuno Tadachika (水野 忠見)	1748–1775	Iki-no-kami	Lower 5th (従五位下)	15,000 koku
3	Mizuno Tadateru (水野 忠韶)	1775–1827	Iki-no-kami	Lower 5th (従五位下)	15,000 koku
