= Matsue Domain =

Administrative division in western Japan during the Edo period (1619-1871)

Matsue Domain 松江藩
- Domain of Japan
- 1600–1871
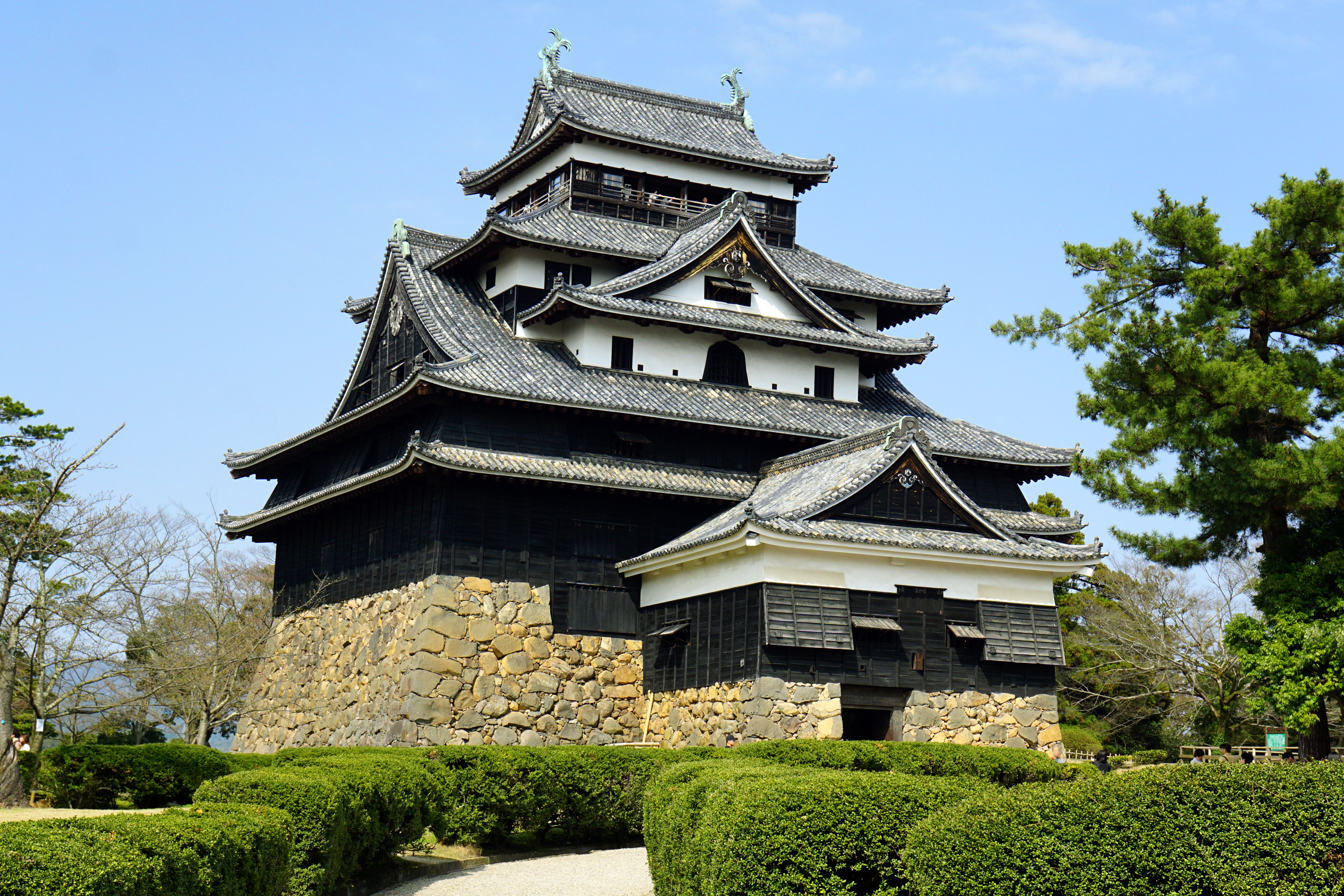
- Matsue Castle

- Mon of the Matsudaira clan
- Capital: Matsue Castle
- Area
  - Coordinates: 35°28′30.5″N 133°3′2.5″E
- Historical era: Edo period
  - Established: 1600
  - Abolition of the han system: 1871
- Contained within
  - Province: Izumo, Oki Provinces
- Today part of: Shimane Prefecture

Location of Matsue Castle
Matsue Domain (Japan)

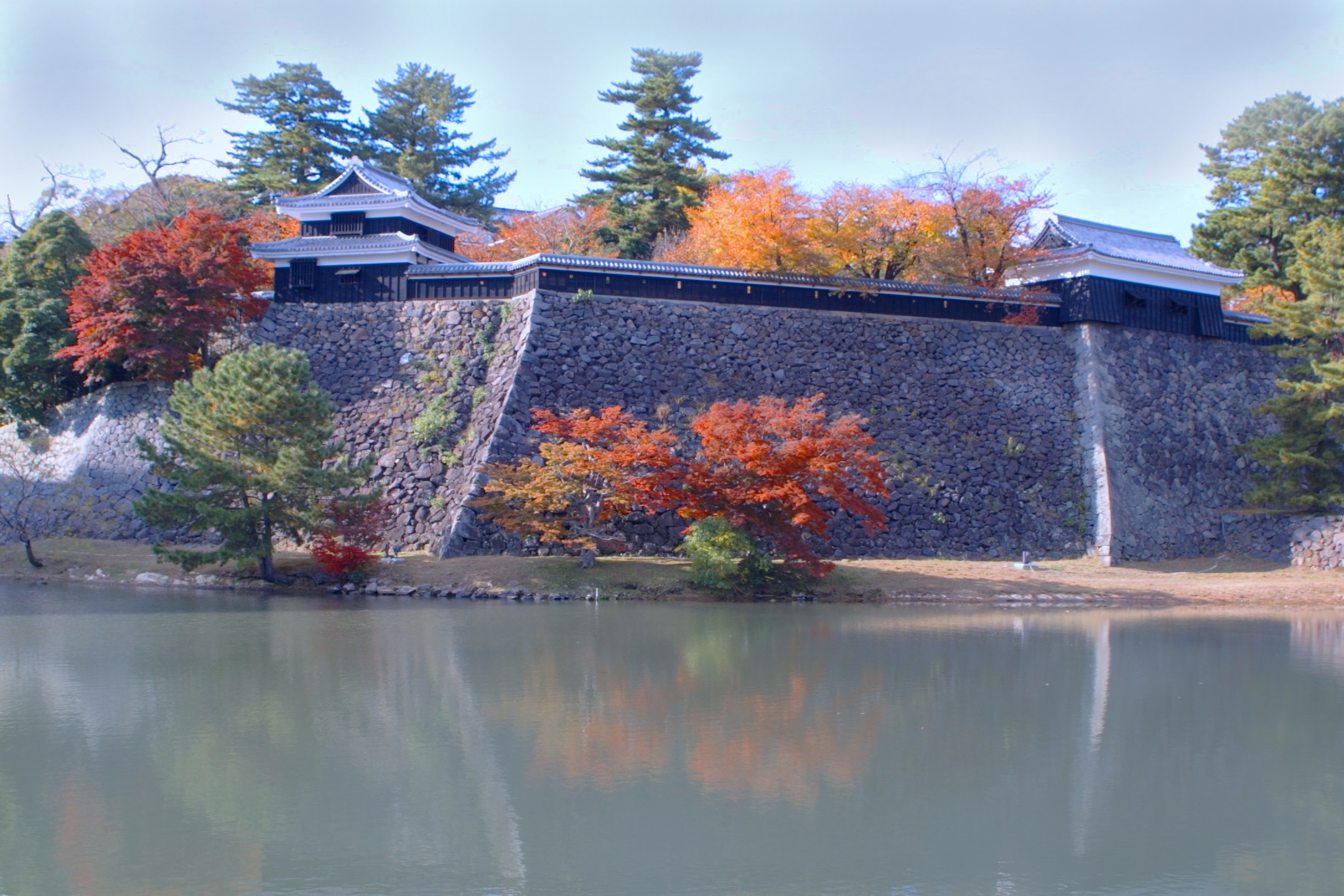
Surviving walls and moat of Matsue Castle

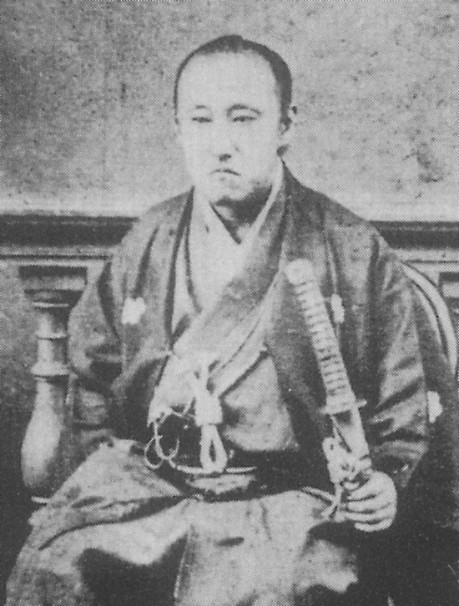
Matsudaira Sadayasu, final daimyō of Matsue

Matsue Domain (松江藩, Matsue-han) was a feudal domain under the Tokugawa shogunate of Edo period Japan, in what is now eastern Shimane Prefecture. It was centered around Matsue Castle and was ruled for most of its history by branch of the Matsudaira clan.

== History ==
During the Toyotomi era, Izumo was under the control of the Mōri clan, which ruled over nine provinces in the San'in and San'yō regions. Kikkawa Hiroie, from a cadet branch of the clan, ruled from Gassan-Tomida Castle (in present-day Yasugi, Shimane), which was once the stronghold of the Amago clan. However, following the 1600 Battle of Sekigahara, the Mōri were reduced to the two provinces of Suō and Nagato, and the Kikkawa clan was transferred to Iwakuni Domain. The Tokugawa shogunate assigned Izumo and Oki Provinces to Horio Tadauji, whose father Horio Yoshiharu had just retired from Hamamatsu Domain, with a kokudaka of 240,000 koku. This marked the start of "Izumo Tomita Domain", as initially its stronghold renamed Gassan-Tomida Castle. However, Horio Tadauji died in 1604 at the age of 27 and his successor, Tadaharu was only age 5, so his grandfather Yoshiharu came out of retirement and ruled as regent. Yoshiharu felt that Gassan-Tomida Castle was inconvenient, so he spent five years starting in 1607 to build Matsue Castle and its castle town. In 1611, Yoshiharu officially relocated his seat to Matsue Castle and "Matsue Domain"" was established, but Yoshiharu died shortly afterwards. Tadaharu died in 1633 without an heir. Even before he died, it was clear to the shogunate that the domain would go into attainder, and there were discussions that the three provinces of Izumo, Iwami, and Oki would be added to the holdings of Mori Tadamasa, daimyō of Tsuyama Domain. Tsuyama Domain even sent inspectors to examine the proposed new territories, but Mori Tadamasa died in Kyoto in 1634 and the discussion was abandoned.

Instead, in 1634, Kyōgoku Tadataka was transferred from Obama Domain in Wakasa Province. The Kyōgoku clan were shugo of Izumo Province before losing control to the Amago clan in the Sengoku period, so this was a homecoming. In addition to the 240,000 koku, they gained 40,000 koku for the administration of the Iwami Ginzan Silver Mine and territories in Iwami Province. However, in 1637 Kyōgoku Tadataka died. He had adopted his nephew Takakazu as heir on his deathbed, but this was not recognized by the shogunate. In 1638, Matsudaira Naomasa, the third son of Yūki Hideyasu was transferred from Matsumoto Domain. This branch of the Matsudaira clan would rule Matsue until the Meiji restoration. The clan's finances could not survive on income from annual tax rice alone, and it was in a difficult situation from the beginning. For this reason, a monopoly was established from an early date on to control the production of wax, ginseng, cotton, and iron. In particular, the Izumo has long been known for the production of steel from iron sand using tatara method.

Matsudaira Harusato, the 7th daimyō, who called himself "Fumai", was a particularly famous ruler of Matsue. As a result of promoting financial reconstruction, the domain was able to amass a fortune of 80,000 ryō during the Kansei era (1789-1801). Fumai took advantage of the improvement in the domain's finances, to devote himself to the Japanese tea ceremony, which had been his hobby for some time, founding the Fumai-ryū school. He also sponsored and collected artworks, including pottery and poetry anthologies connected with the tea ceremony, and Matsue was ranked along with Kyoto, Nara, and Kanazawa for the production of wagashi Japanese sweets, which are used in the tea ceremony. He also designed and sponsored the construction of Japanese gardens. Despite the early financial success of the domain, in his later years, due to his enormous dissipation led to issues with the domain's finances.

In the Bakumatsu period, the Matsue's political stance was ambiguous, earning it the mistrust of the new Meiji government In the end, Matsue submitted to the new government and its forces defended Kyoto during the Boshin War that began in 1868. In the same year, the Oki Riots occurred, in which the magistrate of Matsue Domain, was expelled due to an uprising among the islanders over the lack of response to the frequent famines, as well as the lack of response to the arrival and landing of foreign ships. Oki Prefecture was established in 1869, two years earlier than the abolition of feudal domains and establishment of prefectures. Matsue Domain became Matsue Prefecture in 1871, and was subsequently incorporated into Shimane Prefecture. The Matsudaira clan was elevated to kazoku peerage status with the rank of count in 1884.

== List of daimyō ==
#	Name	Tenure	Courtesy title	Court Rank	kokudaka
Horio clan, 1600-1633 (Tozama)
1	Horio Tadauji (堀尾忠氏)	1600 - 1604	Izumo-no-kami (出雲守)	Junior 4th Rank, Lower Grade (従四位下)	240,000 koku
2	Horio Tadaharu (堀尾忠晴)	1604 - 1633	Yamashiro-no-kami (山城守); Jijū (侍従)	Junior 4th Rank, Lower Grade (従四位下)	240,000 koku
Kyōgoku clan, 1633-1637 (Tozama)
1	Kyōgoku Tadataka (堀尾忠氏)	1633 - 1637	Sakon'e-no-shosho (左近衛権少将); Jijū (侍従)	Junior 4th Rank, Lower Grade (従四位下)	240,000 koku
Matsudaira clan, 1637-1871 (Shinpan)
1	Matsudaira Naomasa (松平直政)	1638 - 1666	Sakon'e-no-shosho (左近衛権少将)	Junior 4th Rank, Upper Grade (従四位上)	186,000 koku
2	Matsudaira Tsunataka (松平綱隆)	1666 - 1675	Dewa-no-kami (出羽守); Jijū (侍従)	Junior 4th Rank, Lower Grade (従四位下)	186,000 koku
3	Matsudaira Tsunachika (松平綱近)	1675 - 1704	Dewa-no-kami (出羽守); Jijū (侍従)	Junior 4th Rank, Lower Grade (従四位下)	186,000 koku
4	Matsudaira Yoshito (松平吉透)	1704 - 1705	Dewa-no-kami (出羽守); Jijū (侍従)	Junior 4th Rank, Lower Grade (従四位下)	186,000 koku
5	Matsudaira Nobuzumi (松平宣維)	1704 - 1731	Sakon'e-no-shosho (左近衛権少将); Jijū (侍従)	Junior 4th Rank, Lower Grade (従四位下)	186,000 koku
6	Matsudaira Munenobu (松平宗衍)	1731 - 1767	Sakon'e-no-shosho (左近衛権少将); Jijū (侍従)	Junior 4th Rank, Lower Grade (従四位下)	186,000 koku
7	Matsudaira Harusato (松平治郷)	1767 - 1806	Sakon'e-no-shosho (左近衛権少将); Jijū (侍従)	Junior 4th Rank, Lower Grade (従四位下)	186,000 koku
8	Matsudaira Naritsune (松平斉恒)	1806 - 1822	Dewa-no-kami (出羽守); Jijū (侍従)	Junior 4th Rank, Lower Grade (従四位下)	186,000 koku
9	Matsudaira Naritoki (松平斉斎)	1822 - 1853	Sakon'e-no-shosho (左近衛権少将); Jijū (侍従)	Junior 4th Rank, Upper Grade (従四位上)	186,000 koku
9	Matsudaira Sadayasu (松平定安)	1853 - 1871	Sakon'e-no-shosho (左近衛権少将); Jijū (侍従)	Junior 4th Rank, Upper Grade (従四位上)	186,000 koku

=== Genealogy ===
- Tokugawa Ieyasu, 1st Tokugawa Shōgun (1543–1616; r. 1603–1605)
  - Yūki Hideyasu, 1st Lord of Fukui (1574–1607)
    - I. Matsudaira Naomasa, 1st Lord of Matsue (cr. 1638) (1601–1666; r. 1638–1666)
      - II. Tsunataka, 2nd Lord of Matsue (1631–1675; r. 1666–1675)
        - III. Tsunachika, 3rd Lord of Matsue (1659-1709; r. 1675-1704)
        - IV. Yoshitō, 4th Lord of Matsue (1668–1705; r. 1704–1705)
          - V. Nobuzumi, 5th Lord of Matsue (1698–1731; r. 1705–1731)
            - VI. Munenobu, 6th Lord of Matsue (1729–1782; r. 1731–1767)
              - VII. Harusatō, 7th Lord of Matsue (1751–1818; r. 1767–1806)
                - VIII. Naritsune, 8th Lord of Matsue (1791–1822; r. 1806–1822)
                  - IX. Naritoki, 9th Lord of Matsue (1815–1863; r. 1822–1853)
      - Chikayoshi, 1st Lord of Hirose (1632–1717)
        - Chikatoki 2nd Lord of Hirose (1659–1702)
          - Chikatomo, 3rd Lord of Hirose (1681–1728)
            - Nagataka, 4th Lord of Tsuyama (1725–1762)
              - Yasuchika, 5th Lord of Tsuyama (1752–1794)
                - Naritaka, 7th Lord of Tsuyama (1788–1838)
                  - X. Sadayasu, 10th Lord of Matsue (1855–1882; Lord: 1853-1869; Governor: 1869–1871)
                    - Naoaki, 11th family head, 1st Count (1865–1940; 11th family head: 1882–1940; Count: cr. 1884)
                      - Tadakuni, 12th family head, 2nd Count (1902–1988; 12th family head: 1940–1988; 2nd Count: 1940–1947)
                        - Tadakoto, 13th family head (b. 1925; 13th family head: 1988–)
                          - Naotada (b. 1966)

== Subsidiary domains ==
Matsue Domain had three subsidiary domains:

=== Hirose Domain ===
Hirose Domain (広瀬藩, Hirose han) was created in 1666 for Matsudaira Chikayoshi, the younger brother of Matsudaira Naomasa. It had a kokudaka of 30,000 koku and was based at Hirose jin'ya in what is now the city of Yasugi, Shimane. The eighth daimyō, Matsudaira Naohiro was elevated by the shogunate to the status of a "castle-holding daimyō". The head of the family was ennobled in 1884 with the kazoku title of viscount.

=== Mori Domain ===
Mori Domain (母里藩, Mori han) was created in 1666 for Matsudaira Takamase, the third son of Matsudaira Naomasa. It had a kokudaka of 10,000 koku initially taken directly form the treasury of the parent domain, and thus did not have any physical estates until 1684 when the Mori jin'ya in what is now the city of Yasugi, Shimane was built. It was also not subject to sankin kōtai, and its daimyō always resided at the domain's mansion in the Kita-Aoyama area of Edo. The site is now occupied by the Brazilian embassy. It was known as Kanbe Domain (神戸藩) until the late Edo period. The head of the family was ennobled in 1884 with the kazoku title of viscount.

=== Matsue Shinden Domain ===
Matsue Shinden Domain (松江新田藩, Matsue Shinden han) was created in 1701 for Matsudaira Chikanori, the fifth son of Matsudaira Tsunataka. It had a kokudaka of 10,000 koku of new rice lands taken directly form the treasury of the parent domain, and thus did not have any physical estates. In 1704, Chikinori was adopted as heir by his older brother, Tsunachika, the third daimyō of Matsue, and upon becoming the fourth daimyō in 1704, changed his name Yoshito. The domain was absorbed back into Matsue Domain at that time.

== Holdings at the end of the Edo period ==
As with most domains in the han system, Matsue Domain consisted of several discontinuous territories calculated to provide the assigned kokudaka, based on periodic cadastral surveys and projected agricultural yields, g.

- Izumo Province
  - 51 villages in Shimane District
  - 20 villages in Akishika District
  - 23 villages in Tatenui District
  - 19 villages in Izumo District
  - 72 villages in Nita District
  - 46 villages in Ohara District
  - 23 villages in Jinmon District
  - 85 villages in Iishi District
  - 41 villages in Nita District
  - 28 villages in Nogi District
  - 35 villages in Yiu District
- Oki Province
  - 8 villages in Ama District
  - 5 villages in Chibu District
  - 16 villages in Onji District
  - 32 villages in Shuji District

== See also ==
- List of Han
- Abolition of the han system
