= Tsurumaki Domain =

Tsurumaki Domain 鶴牧藩
- under Tokugawa shogunate Japan
- 1827–1871
- Capital: Tsurumaki jin'ya
  - Type: Daimyō
- Historical era: Edo period
  - Established: 1827
  - Disestablished: 1871
- Today part of: part of Chiba Prefecture

Tsurumaki Domain (鶴牧藩, Tsurumaki-han) was a feudal domain under the Tokugawa shogunate of the Edo period, located in Kazusa Province (modern-day Chiba Prefecture), Japan. It was centered on Tsurumaki jin'ya in what is now the city of Ichihara, Chiba. It was ruled for the entirety of its history by a branch of the Mizuno clan. The name of “Tsurumaki” came from the Mizuno kamiyashiki in Edo, which was located in Wadeda-Tsurumaki-cho.

== History ==
Tsurumaki Domain was created on May 19, 1827, when Mizuno Tadateru, the daimyō of Hōjō Domain in Awa Province relocated his jin'ya from Awa to Kazusa. As he was entitled by his status to have a castle, rather than a fortified residence, his jin'ya was called "Tsurumaki Castle". He died the following year, and his adopted son, Mizuno Tadamitsu, also served as a wakadoshiyori in the shōgun's court in Edo. Tadamitsu's son Mizuno Tadayori fought on the shogunal side in the Boshin War of the Meiji Restoration, attacking his pro-imperial neighbors. As a result, he was forced to give up most of his holdings scattered around Awa and Kazusa provinces in exchange for new lands in 1869. However, he was pardoned by the new Meiji government the following year, becoming domainal governor until the abolition of the han system in 1871. He was subsequently made a viscount (shishaku) in the kazoku peerage, and the former Tsumaki Domain absorbed into the short-lived Kisarazu Prefecture before becoming part of modern Chiba Prefecture.

The domain had a population of 20,586 people in 4757 households per an 1869 census.

== Holdings at the end of the Edo period ==
As with most domains in the han system, Tsurumaki Domain consisted of several discontinuous territories calculated to provide the assigned kokudaka, based on periodic cadastral surveys and projected agricultural yields.

- Kazusa Province
  - 1 village in Moda District
  - 12 villages in Ichihara District
  - 1 village in Isumi District
  - 1 village in Kamihabu District
  - 31 villages in Nagara District
  - 11 villages in Yamabe District
- Awa Province
  - 5 villages in Nagasa District
  - 1 village in Asai District

== List of daimyō ==
- Mizuno clan (fudai) 1827–1871

#	Name	Tenure	Courtesy title	Court Rank	kokudaka
1	Mizuno Tadateru (水野忠韶)	1827–1828	Oki-no-kami (壱岐守)	Lower 5th (従五位下)	15,000 koku
2	Mizuno Tadamitsu (水野忠実)	1828–1842	Oki-no-kami (壱岐守)	Lower 5th (従五位下)	15,000 koku
3	Mizuno Tadayori (水野忠順)	1842–1871	Hizen-no-kami (肥前守)	Lower 5th (従五位下)	15,000 koku
