= Izumo Province =

Former province of Japan

Map of Japanese provinces (1868) with Izumo Province highlighted.

Izumo Province (出雲国, Izumo no Kuni; Japanese pronunciation: [í.(d͡)zɨ̀.mò̞ (nò̞ kɯ̈̀.ɲ̟ì)]) was an old province of Japan which today consists of the eastern part of Shimane Prefecture. It was sometimes called Unshū (雲州). The province is in the Chūgoku region.

== History ==
During the early Kofun period (3rd century), the Izumo region was independent and constructed rectangular tumuli. In the fourth century, this region saw the construction of rectangular and key-shaped tumuli.

During the 6th or 7th century it was absorbed due to the expansion of the Yamato Kingship, within which it assumed the role of a sacerdotal domain. The Old Japanese version of its place name is Idumo.

Today, Izumo Shrine, alongside Ise Shrine, constitutes the most important sacred place in Shinto: it is dedicated to the kami Ōkuninushi, mythical progeny of Susanoo-no-Mikoto and all the clans of Izumo Province. The mythological mother of Japan, the goddess Izanami, is said to be buried on Mount Hiba at the border of the old provinces of Izumo and Hōki, near Yasugi in Shimane Prefecture.

By the Sengoku period, Izumo had lost much of its importance. It was dominated prior to the Battle of Sekigahara by the Mōri clan, and after Sekigahara, it became an independent fief with a castle town at Matsue.

In Japanese mythology, the entrance to Yomi, the land of the dead, was located in the province and was sealed by the god Izanagi by placing a large boulder over it.

== Historical districts ==
- Shimane Prefecture
  - Aika District (秋鹿郡) - merged with Ou and Shimane Districts to become Yatsuka District (八束郡) on April 1, 1896
  - Iishi District (飯石郡)
  - Izumo District (出雲郡) - merged with Kando and Tatenui Districts to become Hikawa District (簸川郡) on April 1, 1896
  - Kando District (神門郡) - merged with Izumo and Tatenui Districts to become Hikawa District on April 1, 1896
  - Nita District (仁多郡)
  - Nogi District (能義郡) - dissolved
  - Ohara District (大原郡) - dissolved
  - Ou District (意宇郡) - merged with Aika and Shimane Districts to become Yatsuka District on April 1, 1896
  - Shimane District (島根郡) - merged with Aika and Ou Districts to become Yatsuka Districton April 1, 1896
  - Tatenui District (楯縫郡) - merged with Izumo and Kando Districts to become Hikawa District on April 1, 1896

== See also ==
- Hirose Domain
- Japanese Cruiser Izumo, an armored cruiser of the Imperial Japanese Navy commissioned in 1898 and named after the province. She served in multiple conflicts including the Russo-Japanese War, World War I, and the Second Sino-Japanese War until she was sunk in the attacks on Kure during the Second World War.
- JS Izumo, a helicopter carrier of the Japan Maritime Self-Defense Force currently in the process of being converted into a light aircraft carrier. Also named after the province.
- Matsue Domain
- Mori Domain (Izumo)
