= Sengenyama Kofun =

Burial mound in the Kantō region of Japan

- 浅間山古墳 (Japanese)
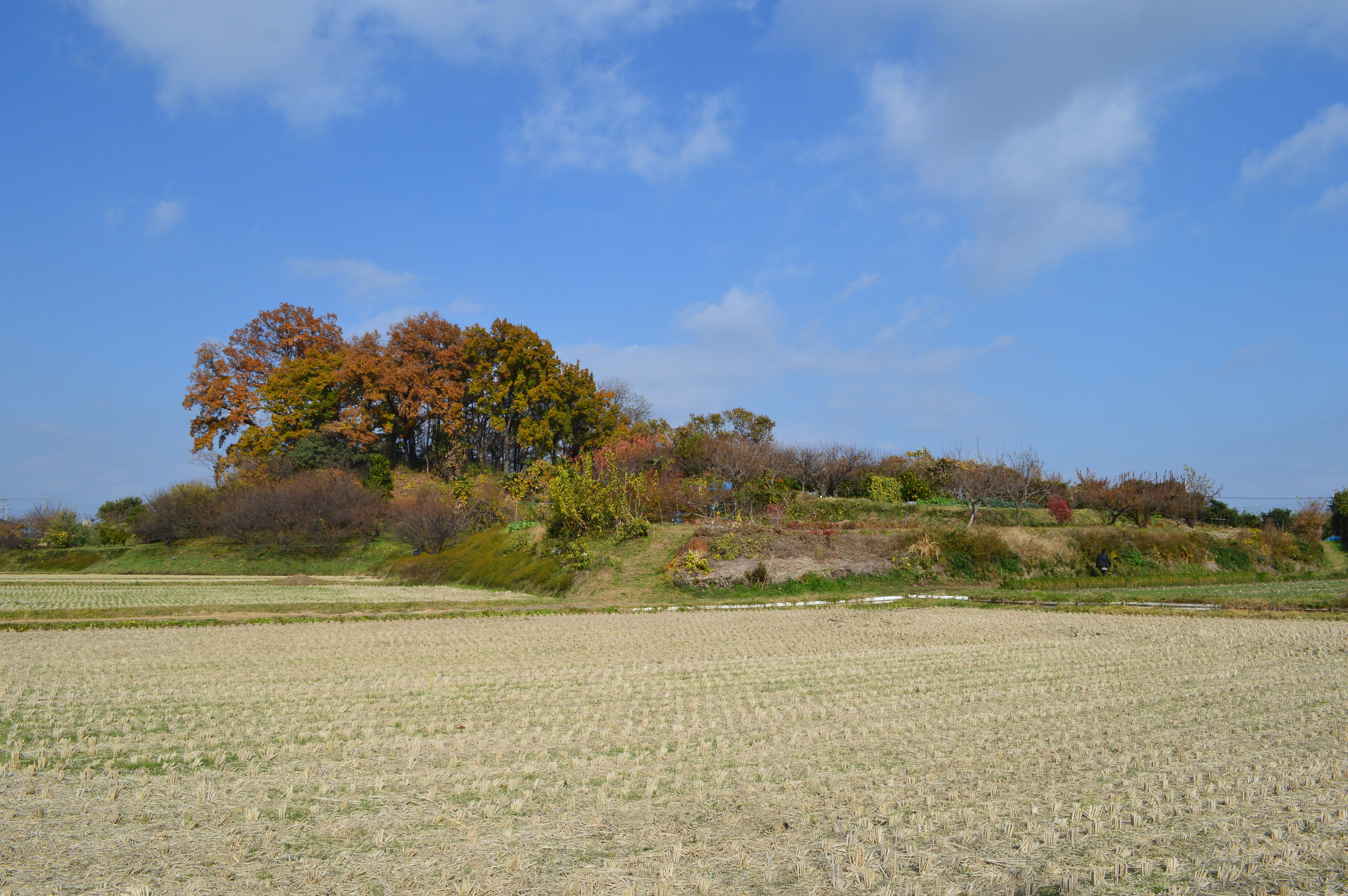
- Sengenyama Kofun

- Sengenyama Kofun Sengenyama Kofun (Japan)
- 36°17′56.21″N 139°2′2.26″E
- Type: kofun
- Periods: Kofun period
- Location: Takasaki, Gunma, Japan
- Region: Kantō region

History
- Built: late 4th to early 5th century

Site notes
- Public access: Yes (Park)

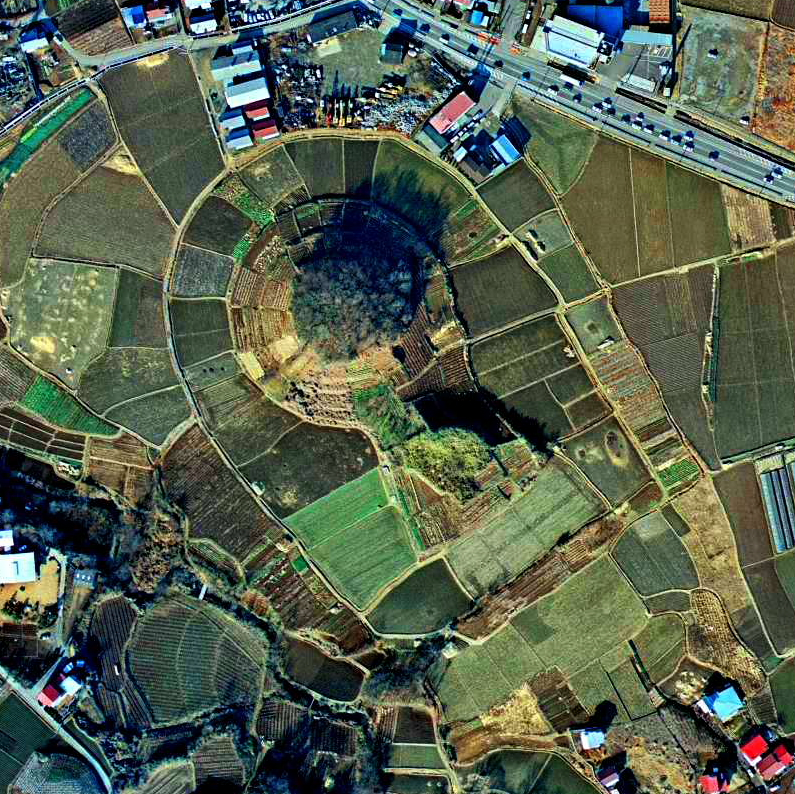
image from above

Sengenyama Kofun (浅間山古墳) is a Kofun period burial mound located in the Kuraganomachi neighborhood the city of Takasaki, Gunma Prefecture in the northern Kantō region of Japan. It was designated a National Historic Site of Japan in 1927. It is the second largest kofun in Gunma Prefecture after the Ōta Tenjinyama Kofun (Ōta), and third in the Kantō region after the Ōta Tenjinyama Kofun and the Funazukayama Kofun (Ishioka, Ibaraki). It is estimated to have been built around the end of the 4th century and the beginning of the 5th century and is part of a group of 13 tumuli which were concentrated in the vicinity, forming the Kuragano kofun cluster.

== Overview ==
The Sengenyama tumulus is a zenpō-kōen-fun (前方後円墳), which is shaped like a keyhole, having one square end and one circular end, when viewed from above. It is situated on a plain to the southeast of the city center of Takasaki on the left bank of the Karasu River near the confluence of the Kabura River. The tumulus has a total length of 170.5 meters, with a posterior circular portion in three tiers and an anterior rectangular portion two tiers, and is orientated to the southeast. The surface was originally covered in fukiishi and both cylindrical haniwa and figurine haniwa (shaped as people and houses) have been recovered. In design, it closely resembles the Sakimisasagiyama Kofun in Nara, indicating a close connection with the Yamato kingdom. During the Meiji period, local inhabitants dug into the tumulus searching for the burial chamber, but discovered only vermillion painted fragments of stone and clay, and no grave goods. The chamber itself may have been a pit-shaped clay-lined hole.

The tumulus was surrounded by a double moat, with the inner moat having a width of 20 to 30 meters and the outer moat having a width of 56 to 65 meters.

Within the same Kuragano Kofun Cluster are a number of other very large keyhole-shaped tumuli, including the Ōtsurumaki Kofun (123 meters long), which has a separate National Historic Site designation, and the Kotsurumaki Kofun (87.5 meters).

Total length
171.5 meters
Anterior rectangular portion
66.3 meters long x 74.8 meters wide x 5.5 meters high, 2-tier
Posterior circular portion
105 meter diameter x 14.1 meters high, 3-tiers

The tumulus is about 15 minutes on foot from Kuragano Station on the JR East Takasaki Line.

== See also ==
- List of Historic Sites of Japan (Gunma)
