= Ōtsurumaki Kofun =

Kofun period burial mound in Japan

- 大鶴巻古墳 (Japanese)
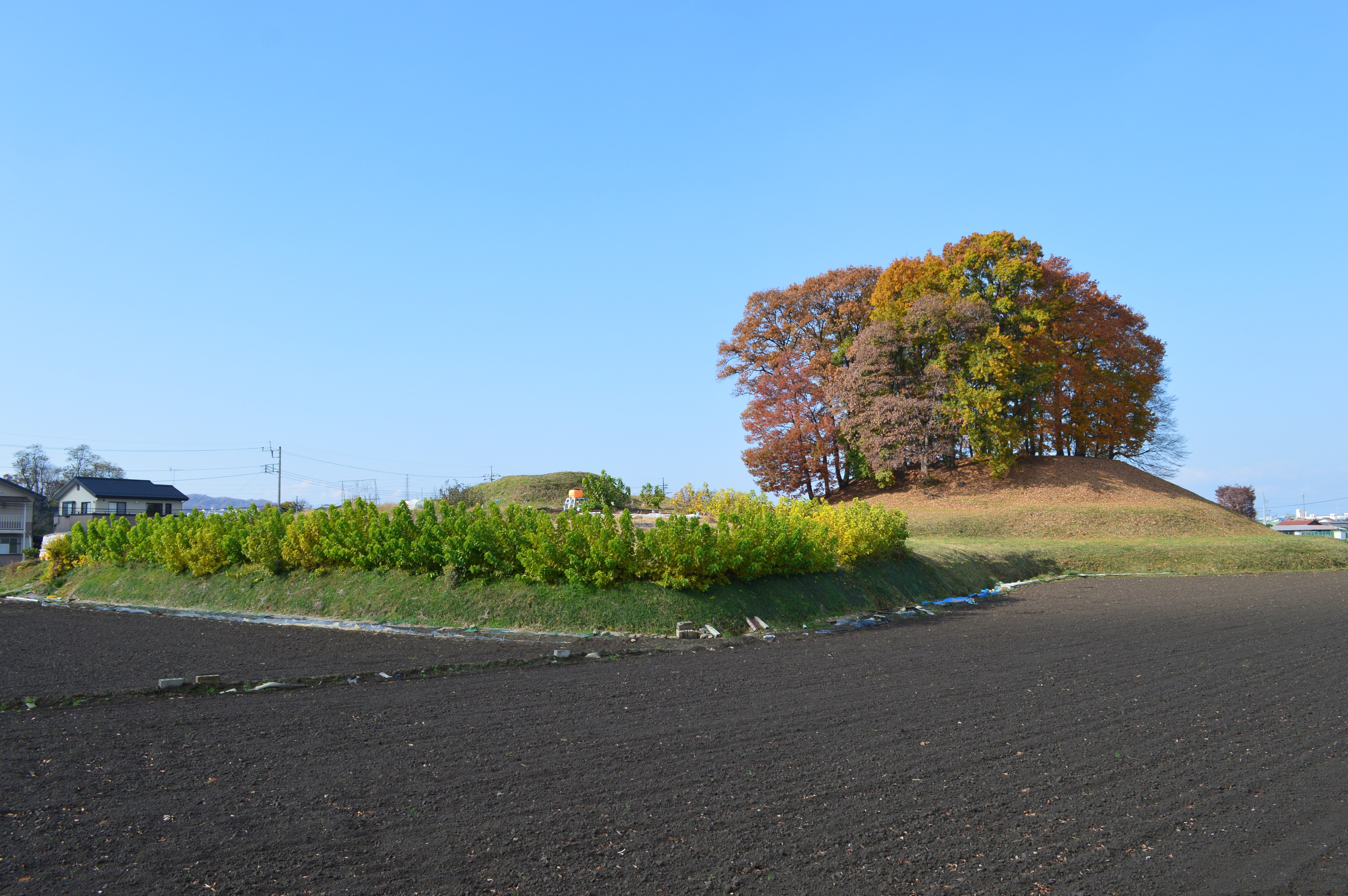
- Ōtsurumaki Kofun

- Ōtsurumaki Kofun Ōtsurumaki Kofun (Japan)
- 36°17′40.25″N 139°2′19.40″E
- Type: kofun
- Periods: Kofun period
- Location: Takasaki, Gunma, Japan
- Region: Kantō region

History
- Built: late 4th to early 5th century

Site notes
- Public access: Yes (Park)

Ōtsurumaki Kofun (大鶴巻古墳) is a Kofun period burial mound located in what is now the city of Takasaki, Gunma Prefecture in the northern Kantō region of Japan. It was designated a National Historic Site of Japan in 1927. It is one of the largest kofun in Gunma Prefecture. It is estimated to have been built around the end of the 4th century and the beginning of the 5th century AD and is part of a group of 13 tumuli which were concentrated in the vicinity, forming the Kuragano Kofun Cluster. Within the Kuragano Kofun Cluster are a number of other very large keyhole-shaped tumuli, including the Sengenyama Kofun (171.5 meters long), which has a separate National Historic Site designation, and the Kotsurumaki Kofun (87.5 meters).

== Overview ==
The Ōtsurumaki Kofun is located on a plain to the southeast of the city center of Takasaki on the left bank of the Karasu River near the confluence of the Kabura River. It is a zenpō-kōen-fun (前方後円墳), which is shaped like a keyhole, having one square end and one circular end, when viewed from above. The tumulus has a total length of 123 meters, with a posterior circular portion in three tiers and an anterior rectangular portion two tiers, and is orientated to the southeast. The surface was originally covered in fukiishi and both cylindrical haniwa and figurine haniwa (shaped as people and houses) have been recovered. In design, it closely resembles the Sakimisasagiyama Kofun in Nara, indicating a close connection with the Yamato kingdom. The tumulus has not been excavated and its internal construction is unknown, but it is suspected to have a pit-type stone-lined burial chamber.

The tumulus was surrounded by a moat, traces of which remain.

Total length
123 meters
Anterior rectangular portion
54 meters long x 51 meters wide x 6.5 meters high, 2-tier
Posterior circular portion
72 meter diameter x 10.5 meters high, 2-tier

The tumulus is about 15 minutes on foot from Kuragano Station on the JR East Takasaki Line.

The adjacent Kotsurumaki Kofun, which is roughly contemporary in age and similar in construction but on a smaller scale, is not covered by the National Historic Site designation.

== Gallery ==
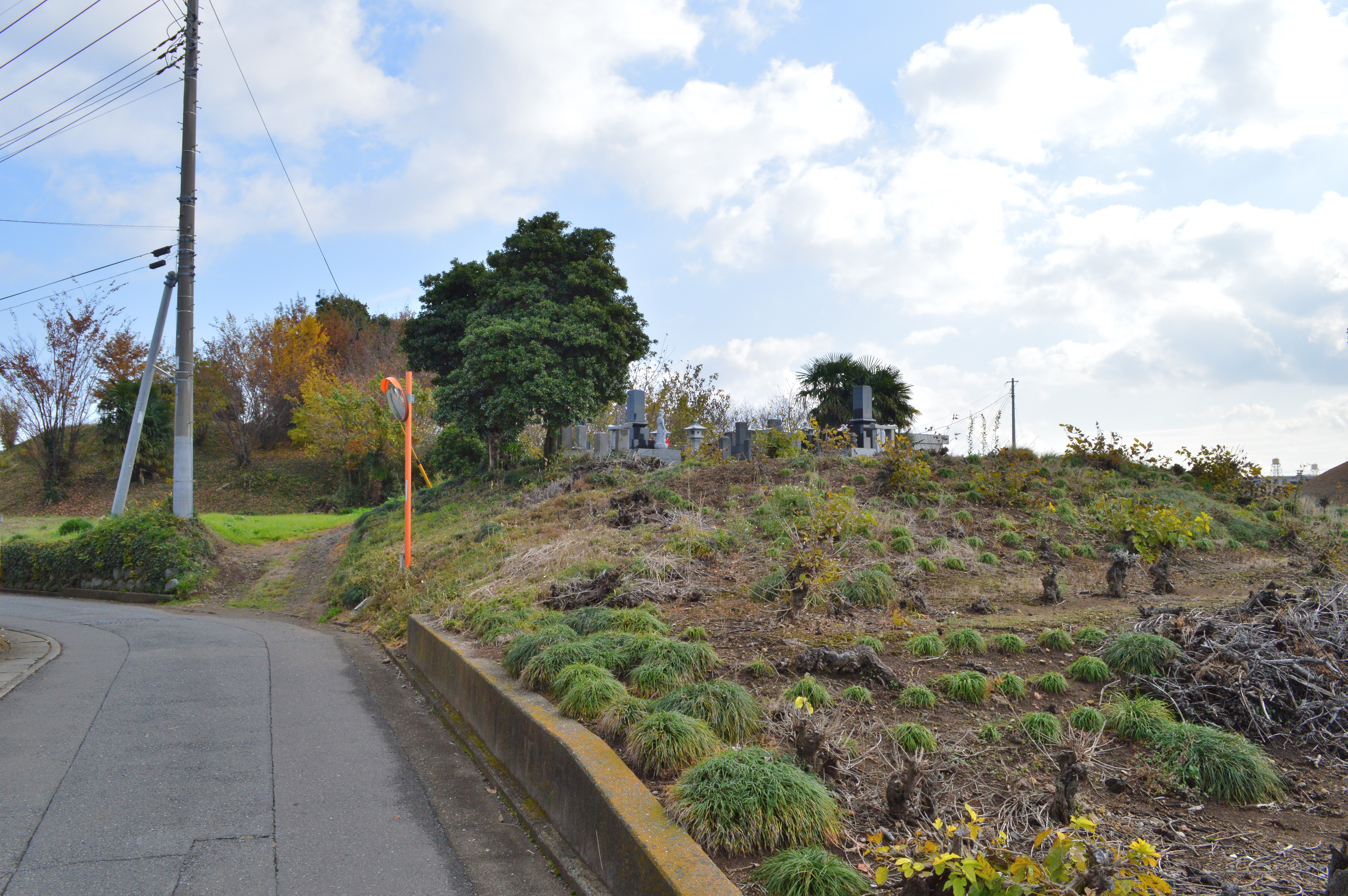
Kotsurumaki Kofun

== See also ==
- List of Historic Sites of Japan (Gunma)
