= Nyotaizan Kofun =

- 女体山古墳 (Japanese)
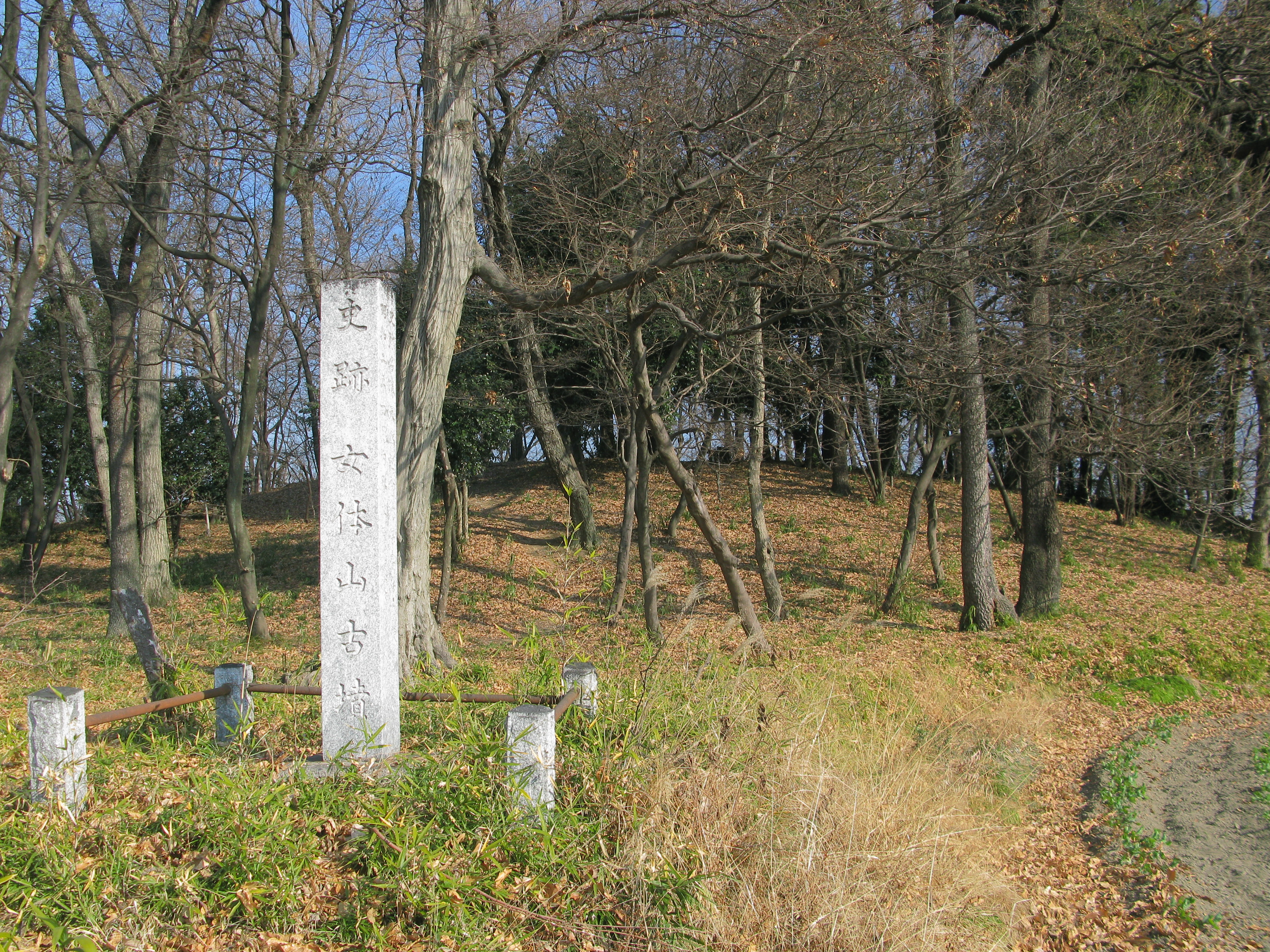
- Nyotaizan Kofun

- Nyotaizan Kofun Nyotaizan Kofun (Japan)
- 36°17′31″N 139°23′40″E
- Type: Kofun
- Periods: Kofun period
- Location: Ōta, Gunma, Japan
- Region: Kantō region

Site notes
- Public access: Yes (no public facilities)

Nyotaizan kofun (女体山古墳) is a scallop-shaped Kofun period burial mound located in what is now the Kashima neighborhood of the city of Ōta, Gunma Prefecture in the northern Kantō region of Japan. The site was designated a National Historic Site of Japan in 1927. It is the third largest scallop-shaped kofun (帆立貝形古墳) in Japan after the Otomeyama Kofun in Nara Prefecture (128.3 meters) and the Osabotsuka Kofun in Miyazaki Prefecture (175 meters)

== Overview ==
The Nyotaizan Kofun is located on a small plateau south of the Kanayama hills. It is part of a group of tumuli which includes the Ōta Tenjinyama Kofun. Its main dimensions are:

- Overall length: 106 meters
- Posterior circle: 84 meter diameter by 7 meters high
- Anterior width: 18 meters by 1 meter high

The tumulus is covered in fukiishi and is surrounded by a moat with a width varying from 11 to 19 meters. Numerous cylindrical haniwa have also been found. The burial chamber was accessed from above, and was pillaged in ancient times; however, the tumulus has not been excavated. From the style, it is estimated that this tumulus dates from the middle of the fifth century AD. It is slightly older than the neighboring Ōta Tenjinyama Kofun, but shares the same orientation, so the two tumuli must be related.

The tumulus is about a 20 minutes walk from Ōta Station on the Tōbu Isesaki Line.

== See also ==
- List of Historic Sites of Japan (Gunma)
