= Matsuokayama Kofun =

Burial mound located in Osaka, Japan

- 松岳山古墳 (Japanese)
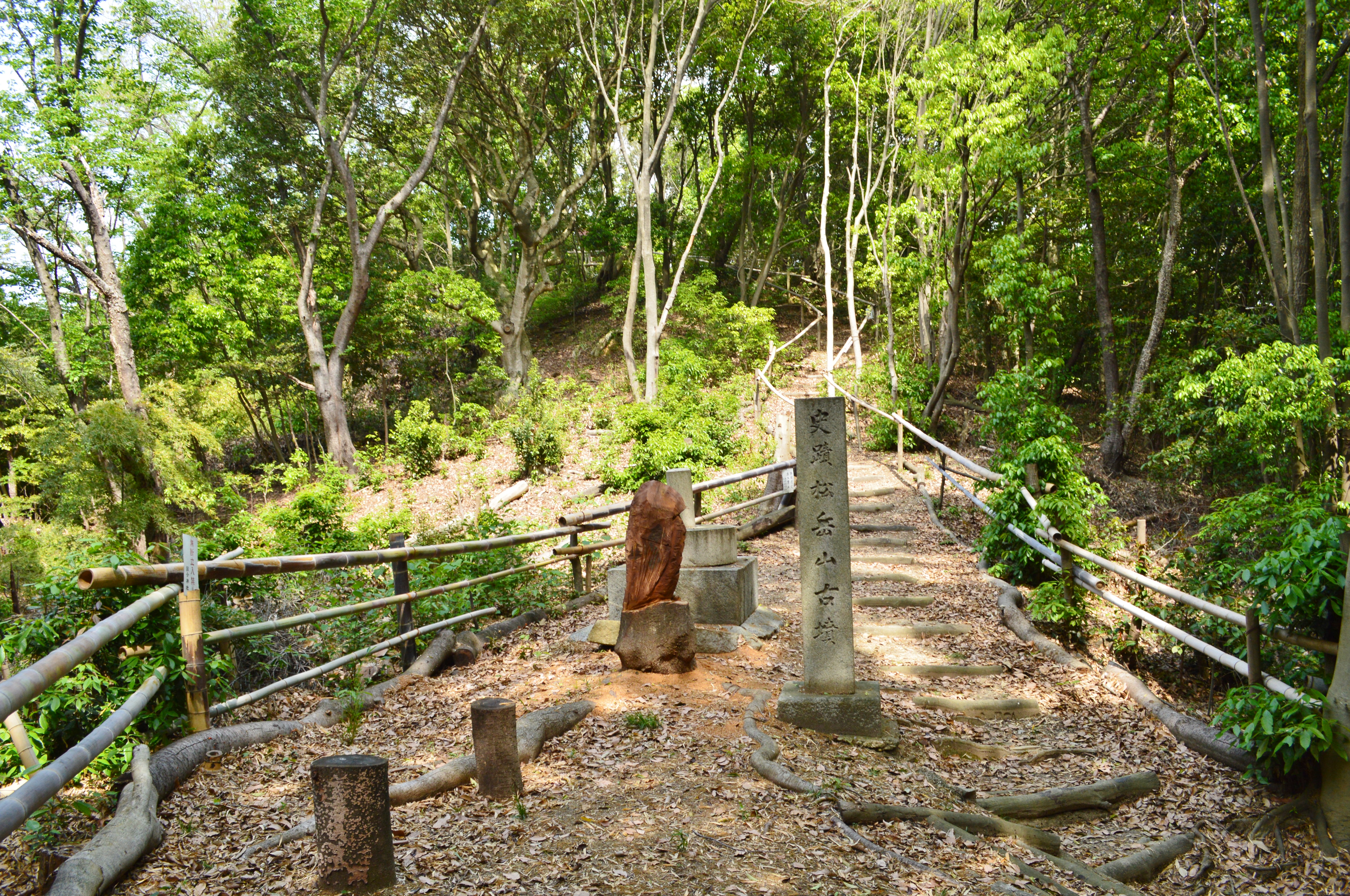
- Matsuokayama Kofun

- Matsuokayama Kofun Matsuokayama Kofun (Japan)
- Interactive map of Matsuokayama Kofun
- 34°34′11.36″N 135°38′43.68″E
- Type: Kofun
- Periods: Kofun period
- Location: Kashiwara, Osaka, Japan
- Region: Kansai region

History
- Built: c.late 4th century

Site notes
- Public access: Yes (Park)

The Matsuokayama Kofun (松岳山古墳) is a Kofun period keyhole-shaped burial mound, located in the Kokubu-ichiba neighborhood of the city of Kashiwara, Osaka, in the Kansai region of Japan. The tumulus was designated a National Historic Site of Japan in 1922. The tumulus is the largest of the Matsudakeyama Kofun Cluster (松岳山古墳群), which has produced many important archaeological finds.

== Overview ==
The Matsuokayama Kofun is a zenpō-kōen-fun (前方後円墳), which is shaped like a keyhole, having one square end and one circular end, when viewed from above. It is located at an elevation of 60 meters, the highest point of the narrow hills of Mt. Matsuoka (Miyama) on the south bank of the Yamato River as it enters the Osaka Plain in the eastern part of Osaka Prefecture, and within the grounds of a Shinto shrine, the Kokubu Jinja. The tumulus has a total length of between 130 and 155 meters, with a posterior circular portion diameter of 72 meters and is orientated to the east. The mound was constructed by stacking thin plate-like stones. The mound was originally constructed in three or four tiers on the posterior circle and two tiers in the anterior rectangular portion, and had both fukiishi and rows of oval cylindrical haniwa; however, the covering earth has eroded away, leading the sarcophagus exposed and the stone slabs used in the burial chamber scattered. This sarcophagus is a combination of six stones, one each for the lid and base stones and four one each side. Two side stones are accompanied by a rope-hanging protrusions. The surface of the bottom stone is carved to fit the body of the burial person.

Antiquarians reported recovered bronze mirrors from the site in 1877 and some stone masonry was removed from the site in 1915, but the current location of these artifacts is now unknown. Archaeological excavations have been conducted in surveys have been conducted in 1955 and from 1984 to 1986. Despite the poor conditions the site, a number of grave goods have been detected inside and outside the sarcophagus, including jadeite magatama and jadeite, jasper or glass beads, copper and iron swords, spears, axes and other items. From these artifacts and the unusual construction technique and style of haniwa, the tumulus is believed to date from the end of the 4th century. Most of the recovered artifacts are currently stored at Kyoto University, but three elliptical cylindrical haniwa and two pot-shaped pottery have been designated as Tangible Cultural Properties of Kashiwara City, and are currently stored in the Kashiwara City Historical Museum.

The Matsuokayama Kofun is located about a 14-drive from Kawachi-Kokubu Station on the Kintetsu Osaka Line.

Total length
between 130 and 155 meters
Anterior rectangular portion
32 meters wide x 6 meters high, 2-tier
Posterior circular portion
72 meter diameter 16 meters high, 3-tiers or 4-tiers

== Gallery ==
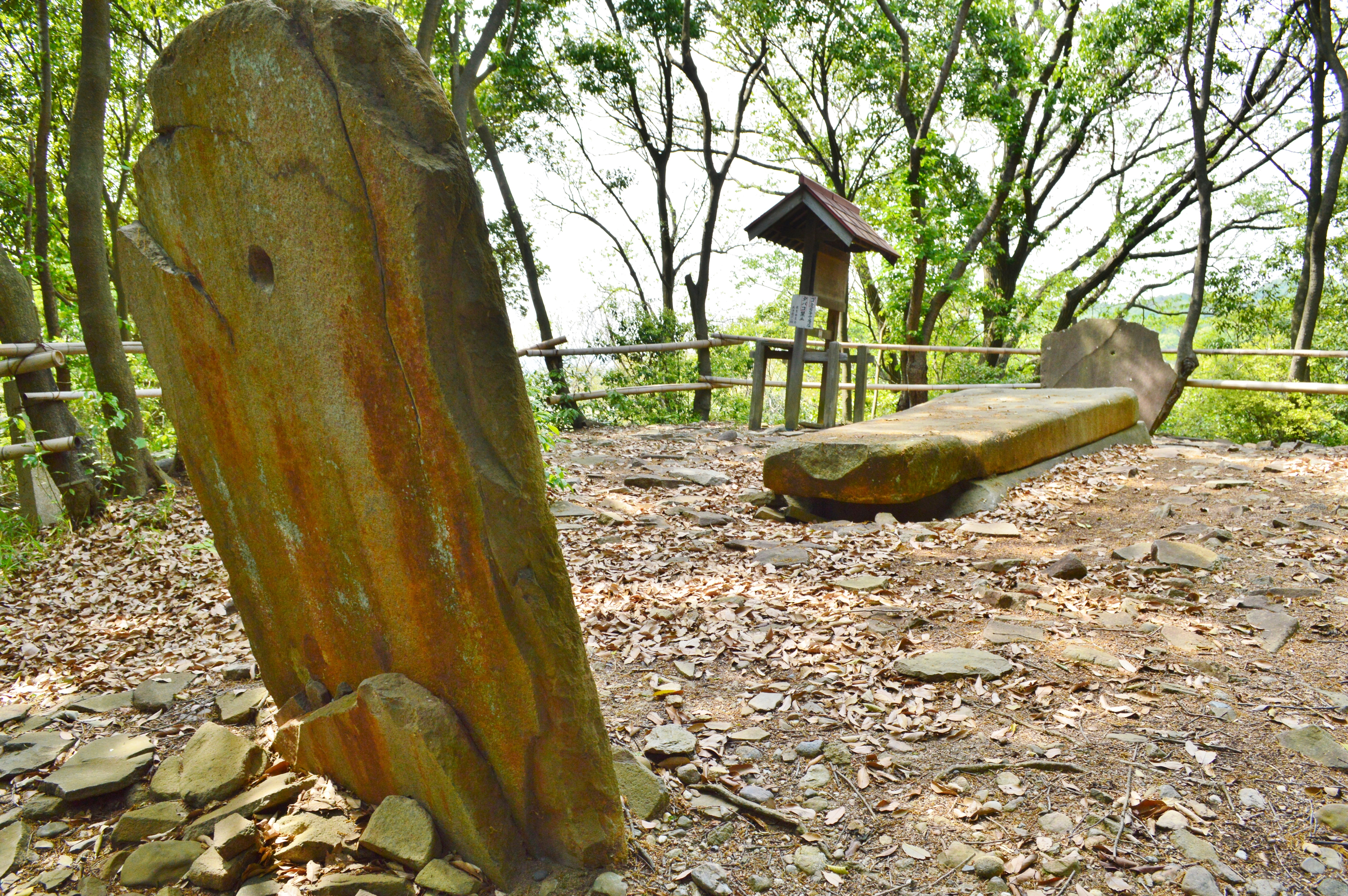
Top of tumulus

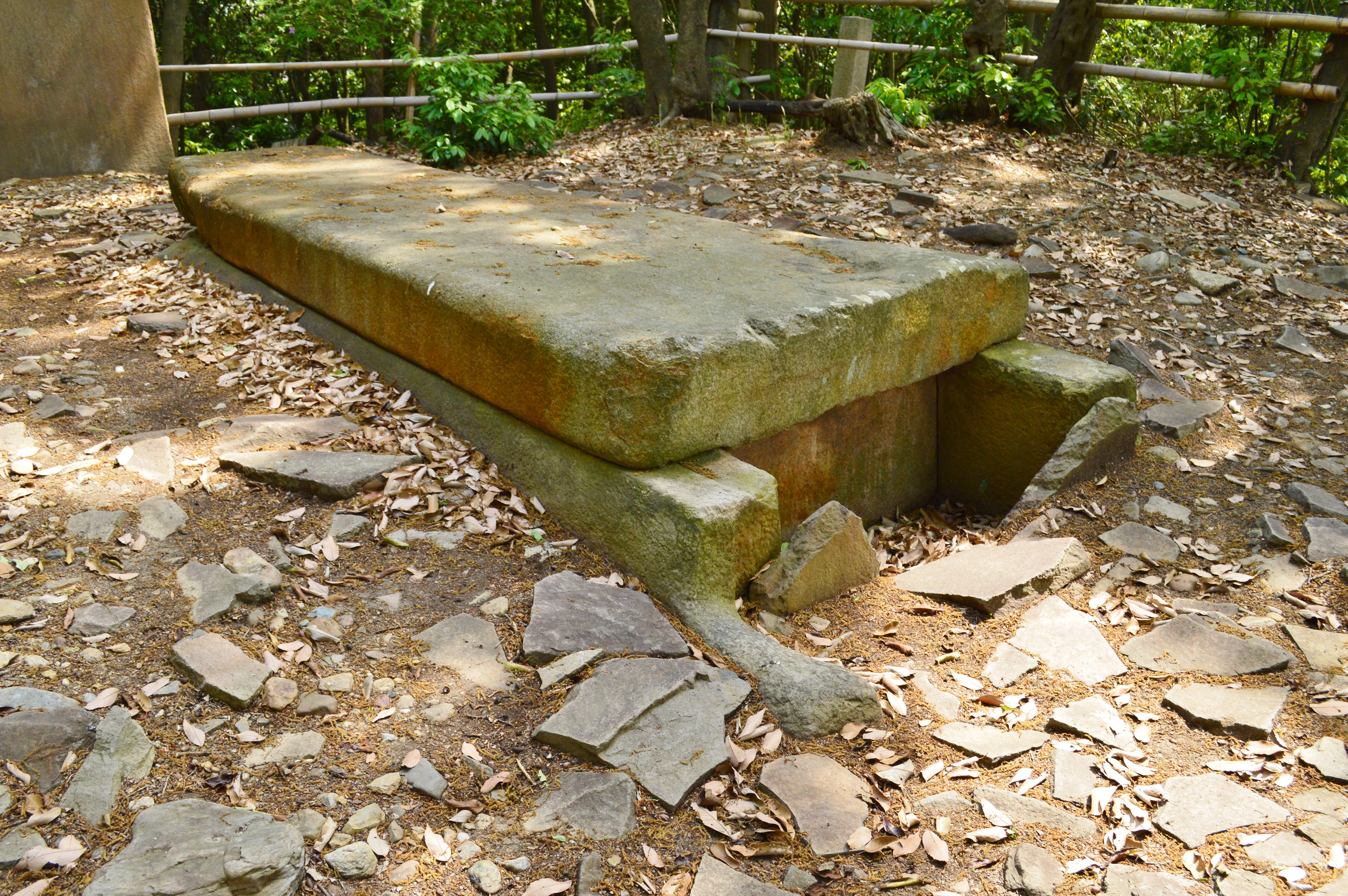
Sarcophagus

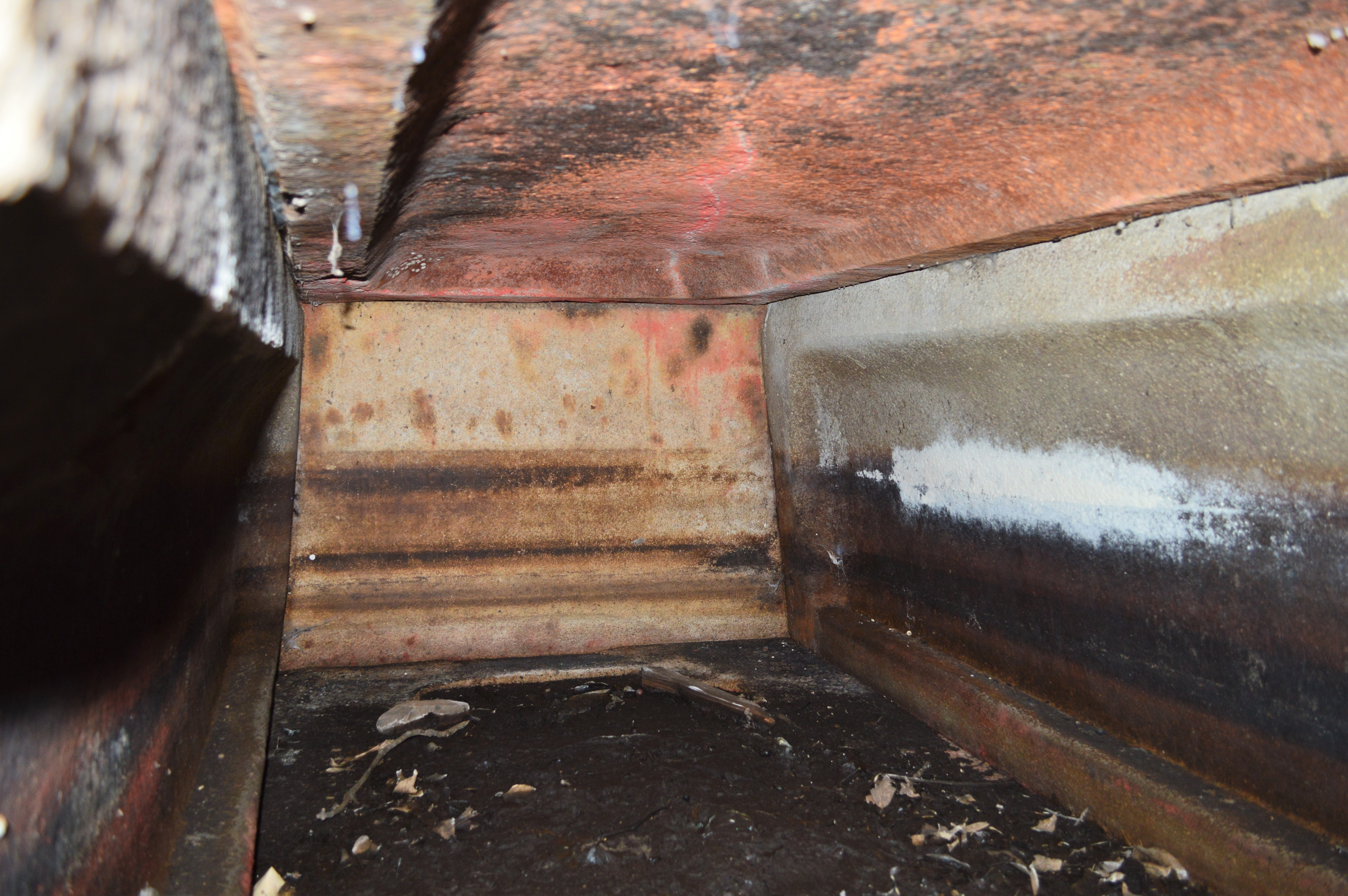
Inside burial chamber

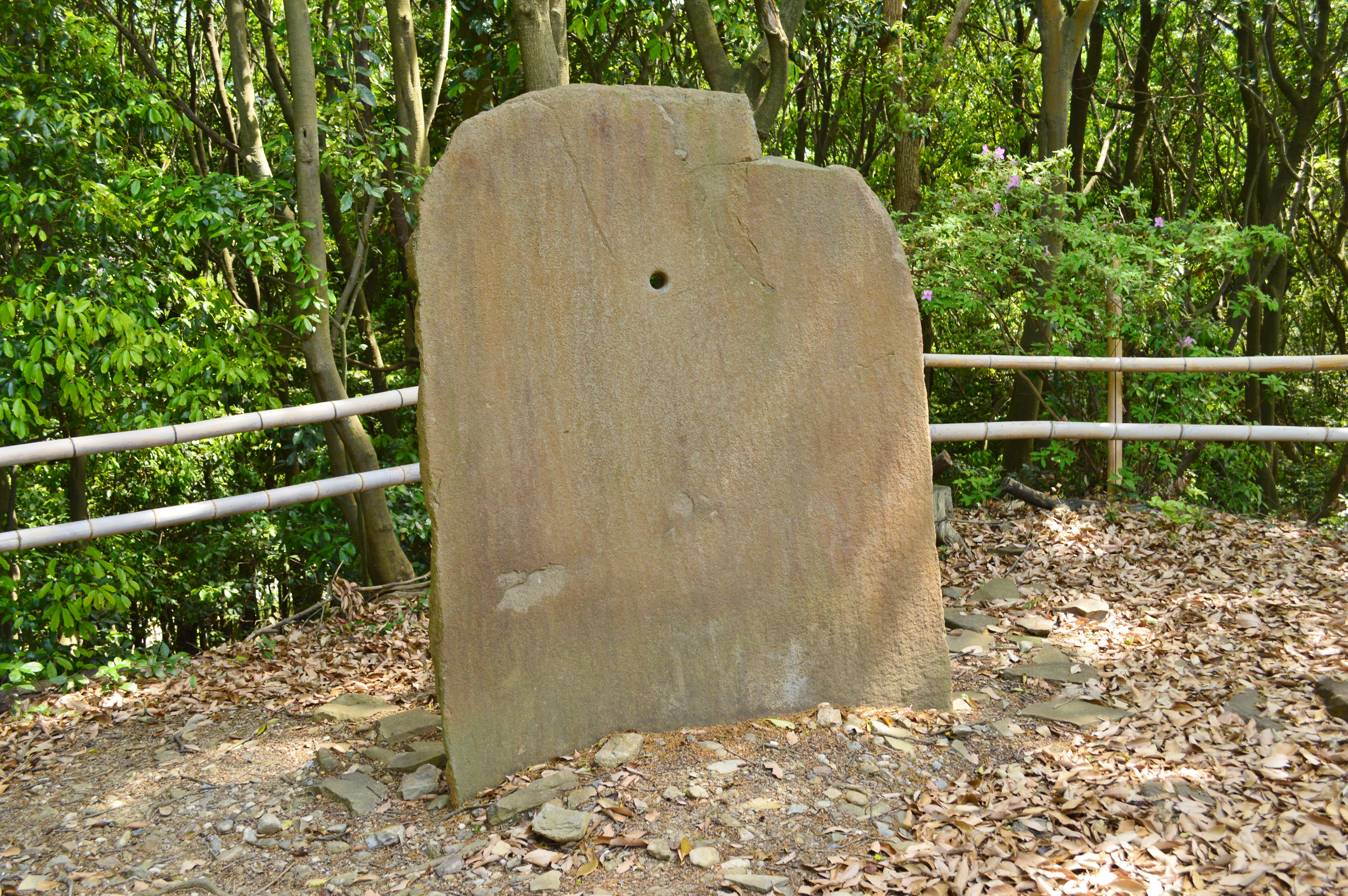
Southern standing monolith

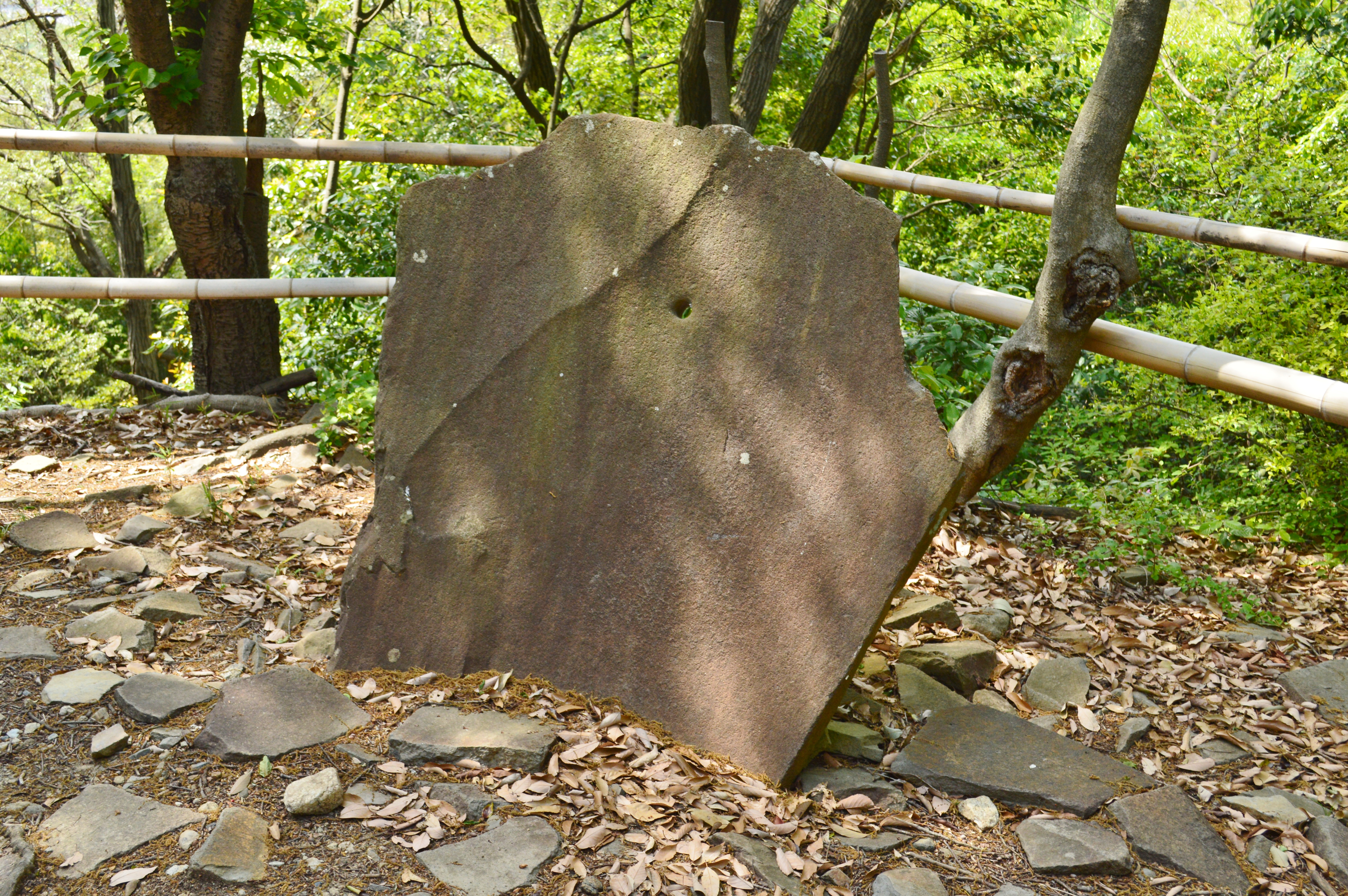
Northern standing monolith

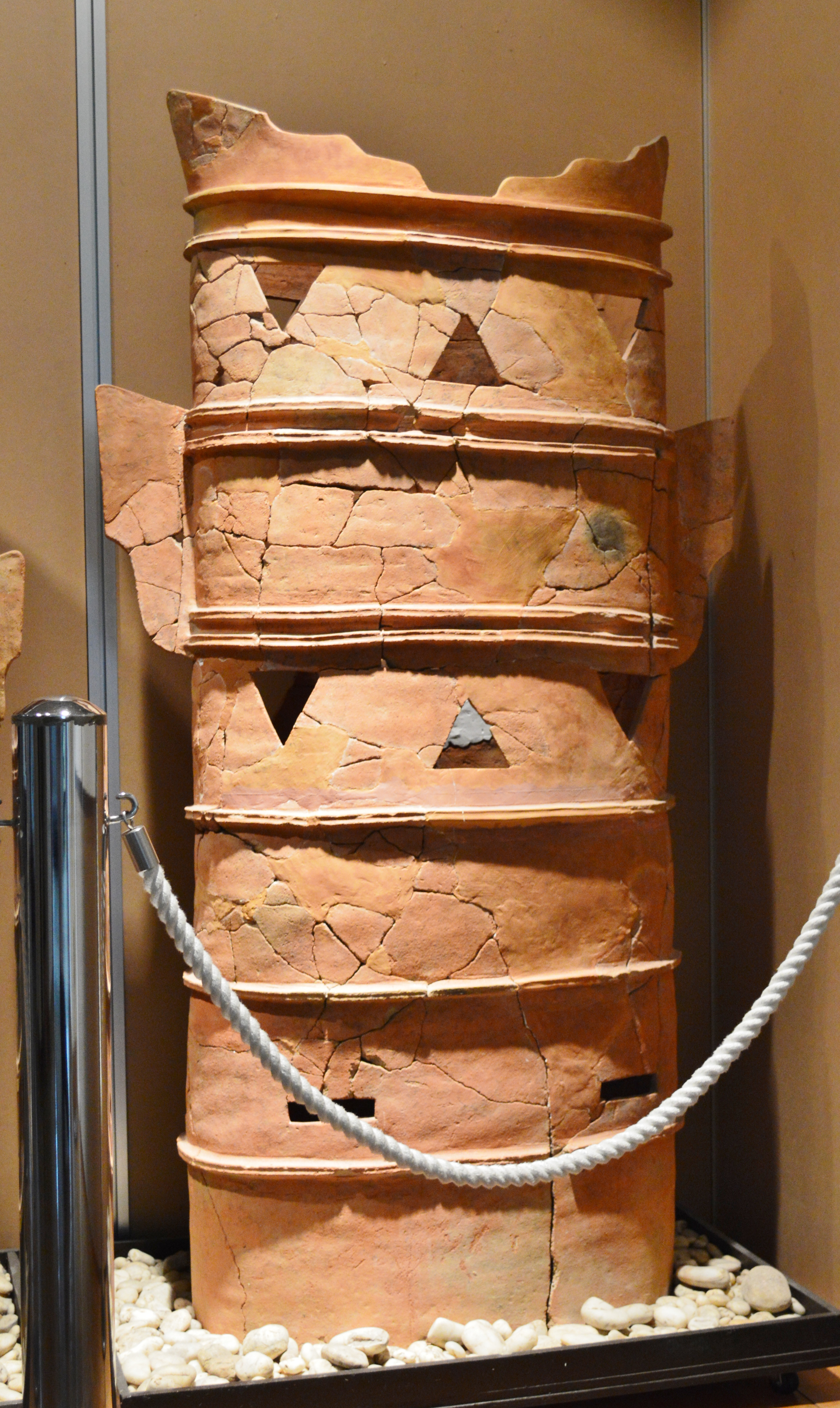
Haniwa

== See also ==
- List of Historic Sites of Japan (Osaka)
