= Ōta Tenjinyama Kofun =

Kofun period burial mound in Japan

ŌtaTenjinyama Kofun
- 太田天神山古墳 (Japanese)
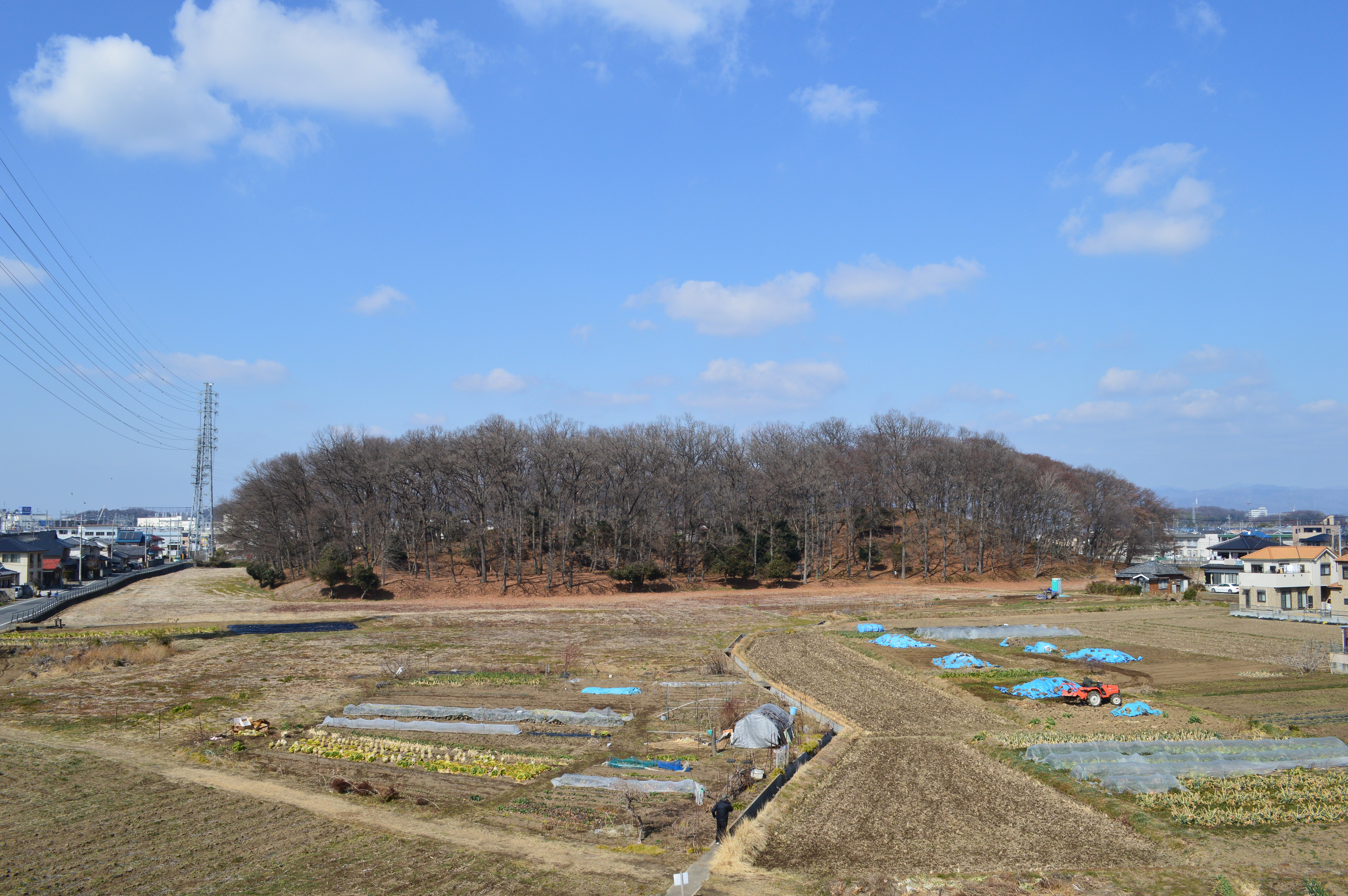
- Ōta Tenjinyama Kofun

- Ōta Tenjinyama Kofun Ōta Tenjinyama Kofun (Japan)
- 36°17′30.04″N 139°23′27.69″E
- Type: kofun
- Periods: Kofun period
- Location: Ōta, Gunma, Japan
- Region: Kantō region

History
- Built: early 5th century

Site notes
- Public access: Yes (Park)

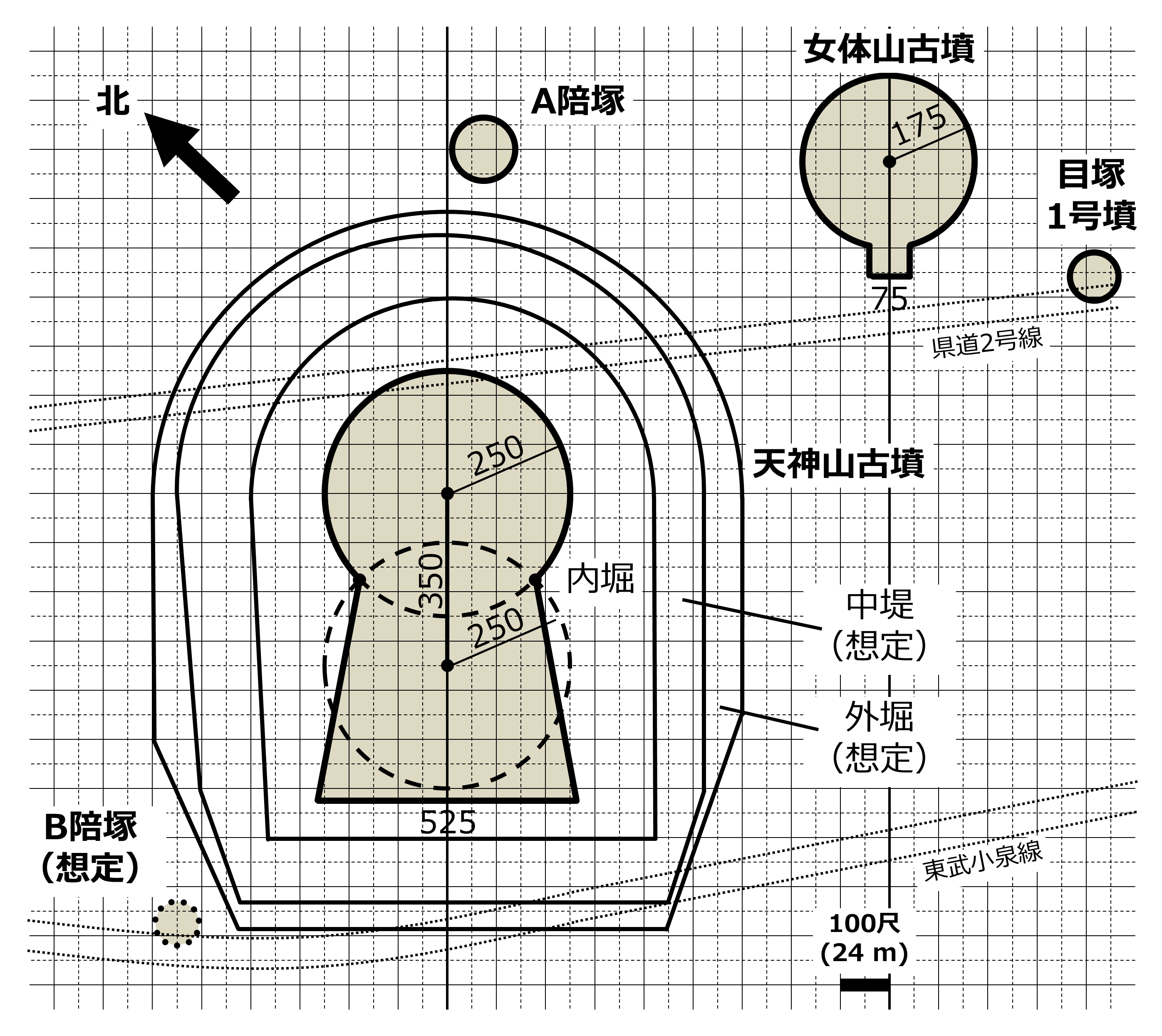
Layout diagram

Ōta Tenjinyama Kofun (太田天神山古墳) is a Kofun period burial mound located in the Uchigashimacho neighborhood of the city of Ōta, Gunma Prefecture in the northern Kantō region of Japan. It was designated a National Historic Site of Japan in 1941. It is the largest kofun in Gunma Prefecture and the 28th largest in the country. It is the only kofun with a length in excess of 200 meters in eastern Japan.. It is also sometimes referred to as the Dantaiyama Kofun (男体山古墳).

== Overview ==
The Ōta Tenjinyama Kofun is a zenpō-kōen-fun (前方後円墳), which is shaped like a keyhole, having one square end and one circular end, when viewed from above. The tumulus is located on a fill with an elevation of approximately 40 meters, located near the center of the city of Ōta in eastern Gunma Prefecture. There was a Shinto shrine dedicated to Tenjin located on the "neck" of the tumulus, from which the name of the kofun is derived. Although the site is truncated by Gunma Prefectural Route 2 (which skirts the posterior dome) and the Tōbu Railway Tōbu Koizumi Line tracks (which crosses the outer moat) the tumulus is in good preservation, with the inner moat intact. The tumulus has a total length of 210 meters, with both the circular portion and the anterior rectangular portion in three tiers, and is orientated to the southwest. The surface was originally covered in fukiishi and both cylindrical haniwa and figurine haniwa (shaped as people and houses) have been recovered. From the design of these haniwa, the date of construction of the tumulus can be estimated to have been from the early middle of the 5th century. The tomb was robbed in antiquity and the structure of the burial chamber is unknown, but the exposed stone sarcophagus is of a design peculiar to the Kansai region and indicates a strong connection with the Yamato kingdom.

Excavated artifacts are stored and displayed at the Ōta City Nittasō History Museum (太田市立新田荘歴史資料館).

Approximately 300 meters to the Ōta Tenjinyama Kofun is the Nyotaizan Kofun, a large scallop-shaped (帆立貝形古墳) tumulus with has the same orientation and was built at roughly the same time. It has a separate National Historic Site designation. There is also a circular-type (empun (円墳)) tumulus to the north of the Ōta Tenjinyama Kofun, with a diameter of 36 meters and height of 3.2 meters, designated "Tumulus A" on the diagram. The same types of haniwa as the Ōta Tenjinyama Kofun have been discovered an it is believed to be contemporary with that tumulus. Another tumulus, designated "B" on the diaphragm is to the southwest; however, it appears to be a much later construction.

The identity of the person this tumulus was constructed for is unknown, but from its size and prominence, and the presence of a stone sarcophagus, it is assumed to be that of a local king who was either an ally or an opponent to Yamato, a Kuni no miyatsuko of ancient Keno Province, or even of a general sent by Yamato to rule over Keno. Whatever the case, the person who built this tomb must have controlled the entire Keno area, as subsequent tombs were on a smaller scale and are ground into clusters corresponding to later subdivisions of the province. The Nihon Shoki mentions the "Keno clan", who were active in diplomacy with the kingdoms of the Korean Peninsula ad who participated in expeditions of the Yamato kingdom. The relationship between the Nyotaizan Kofun and the Tenjinyama Kofun in the northeast is not clear, but a pair of tumuli consisting of a keyhole-shaped tumulus and a scalloped tumulus have been found in other locations, such as the Saitobaru Kofun (Saito, Miyazaki).

Total length
210 meters
Anterior rectangular portion
116 meters wide x 12 meters high, 3-tier
Posterior circular portion
120 meter diameter x 16.5 meters high, 3-tier
Inner moat
36 meter width (near circular portion) to 24 meter width (bottom of rectangular portion) x 1.2 meters depth
Outer moat
6 to 17 meters width

The tumulus is about 15 minutes on foot from Ōta Station on the Tōbu Railway.

== Gallery ==
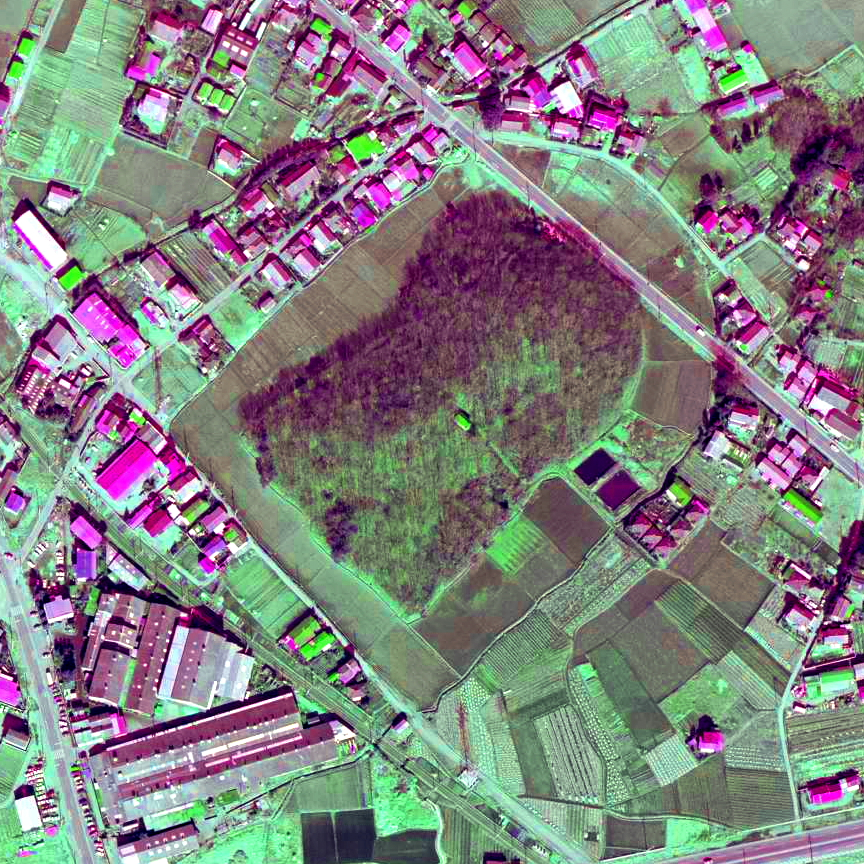
Aerial image

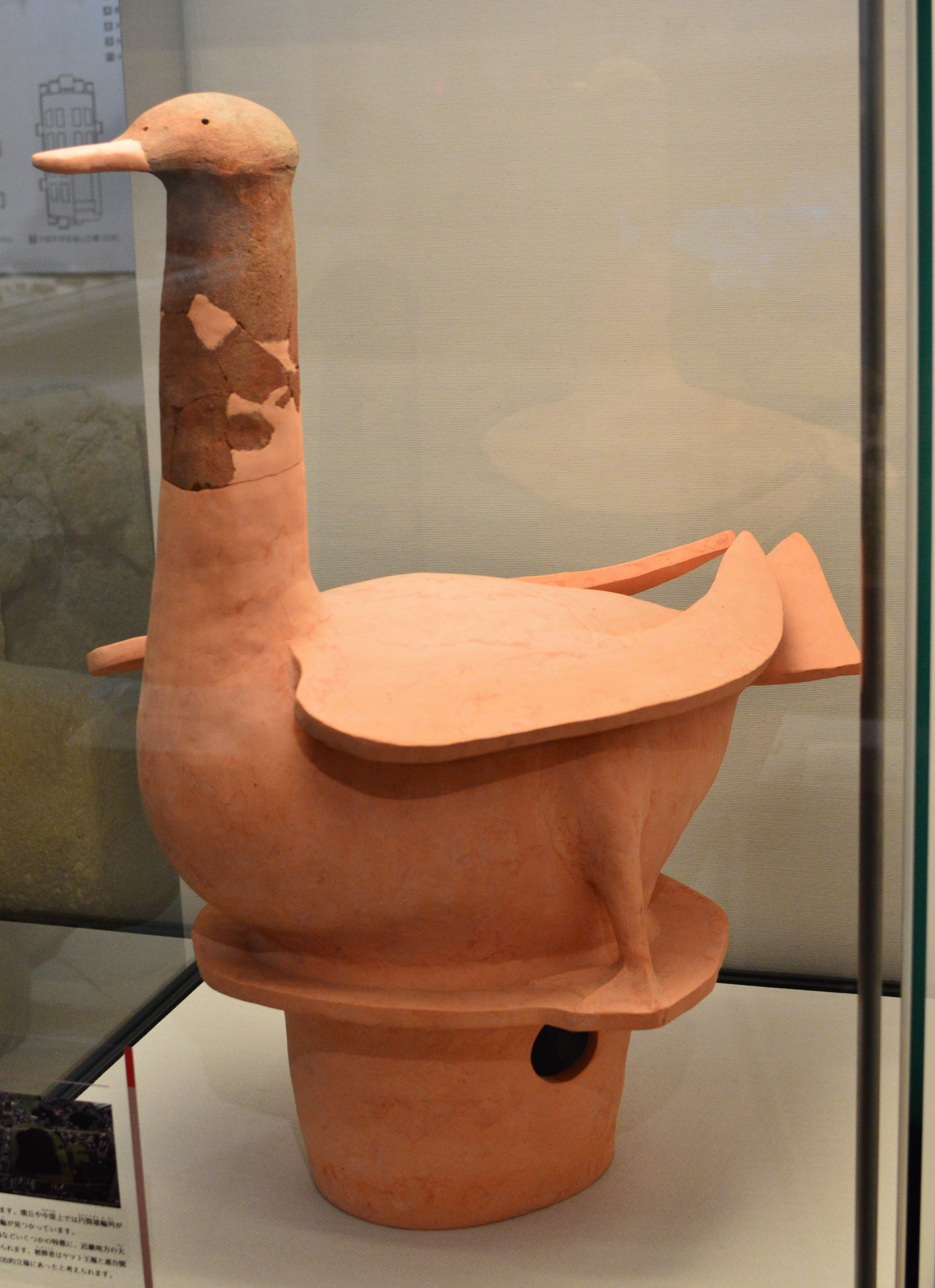
Haniwa recovered from site

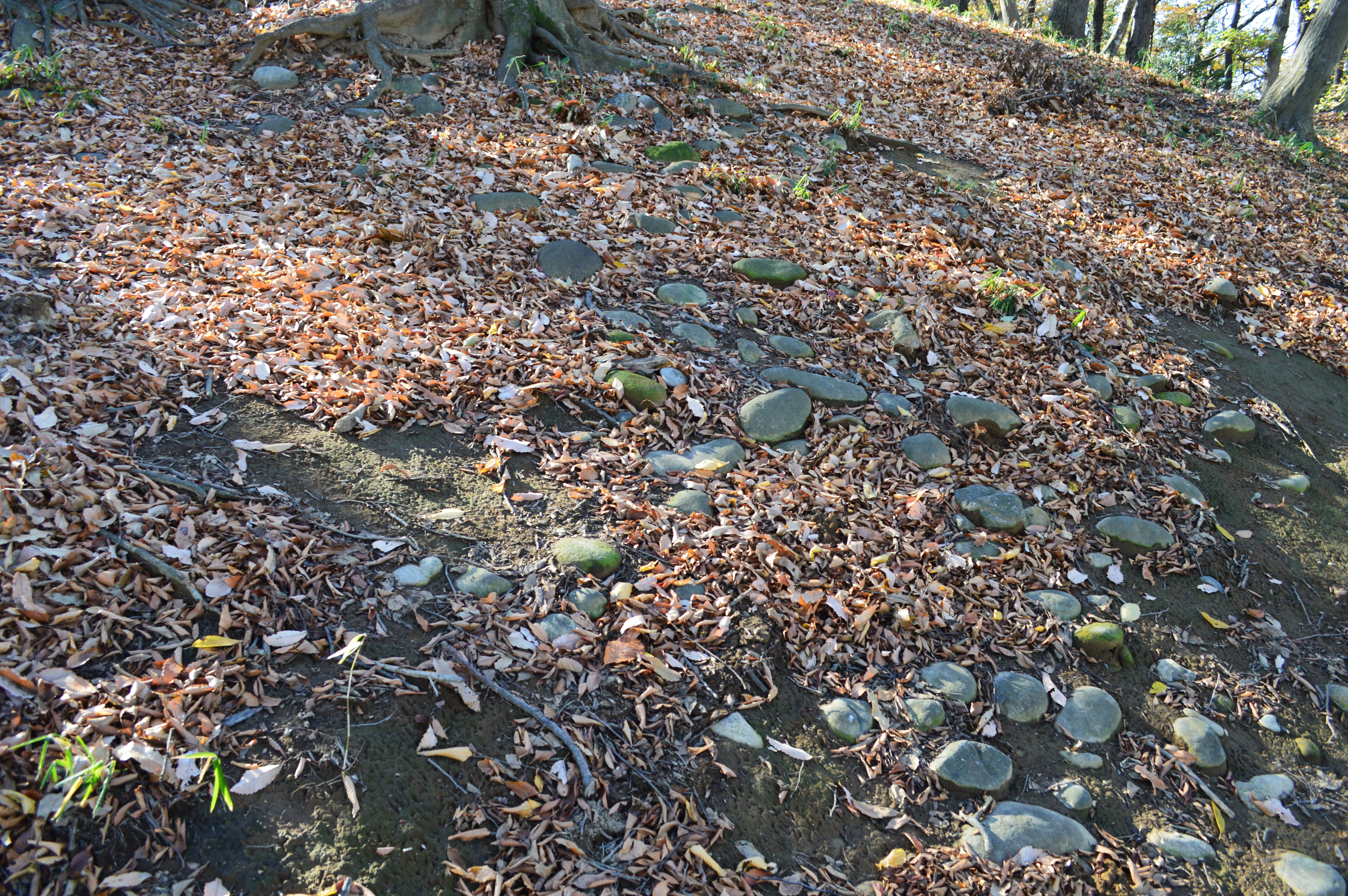
Fukiishi

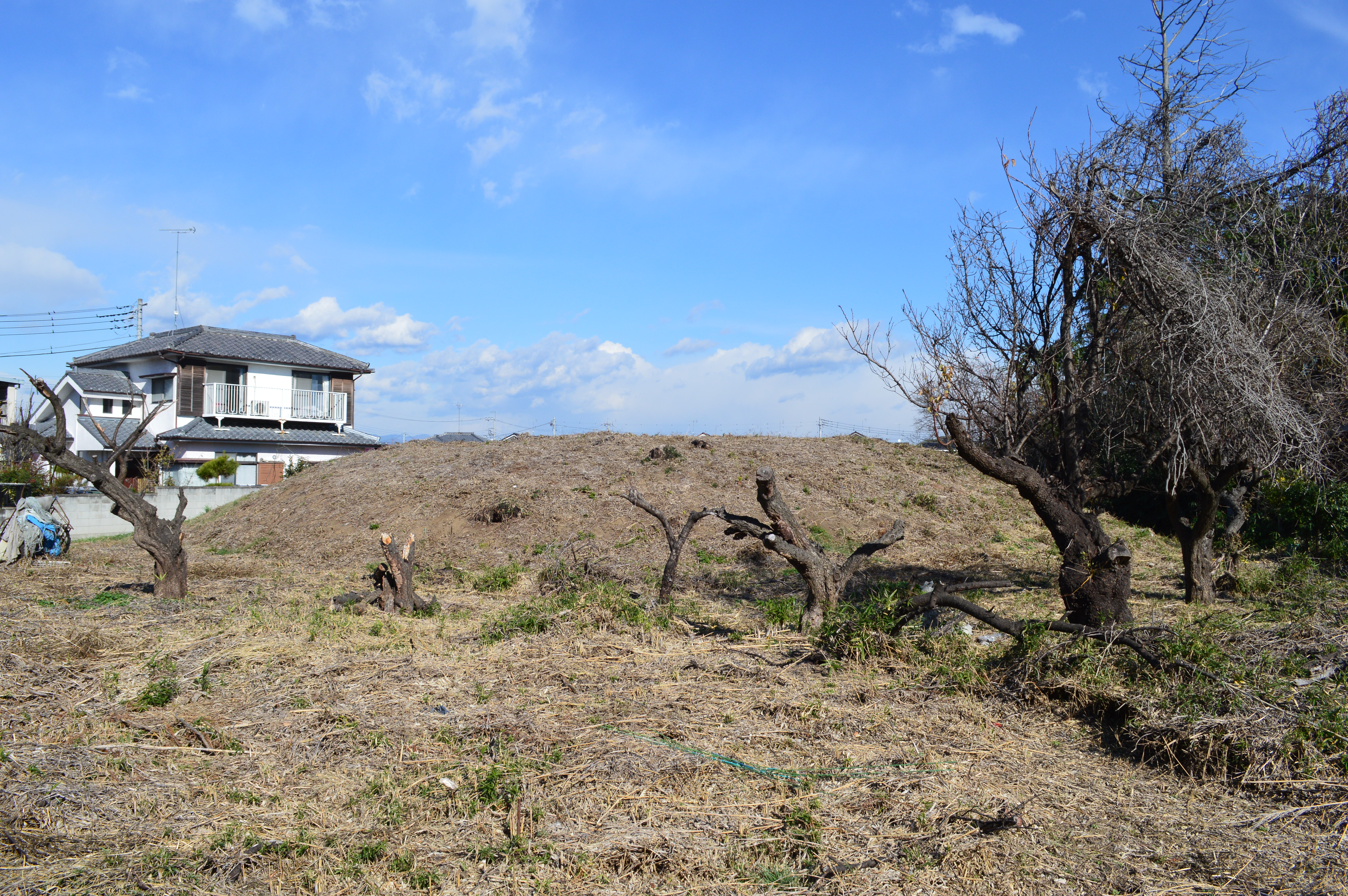
Tumulus "A"

== See also ==
- List of Historic Sites of Japan (Gunma)
