= Nishidani Tumulus cluster =

Nishidani Kofun cluster
- 西谷墳墓群 (Japanese)
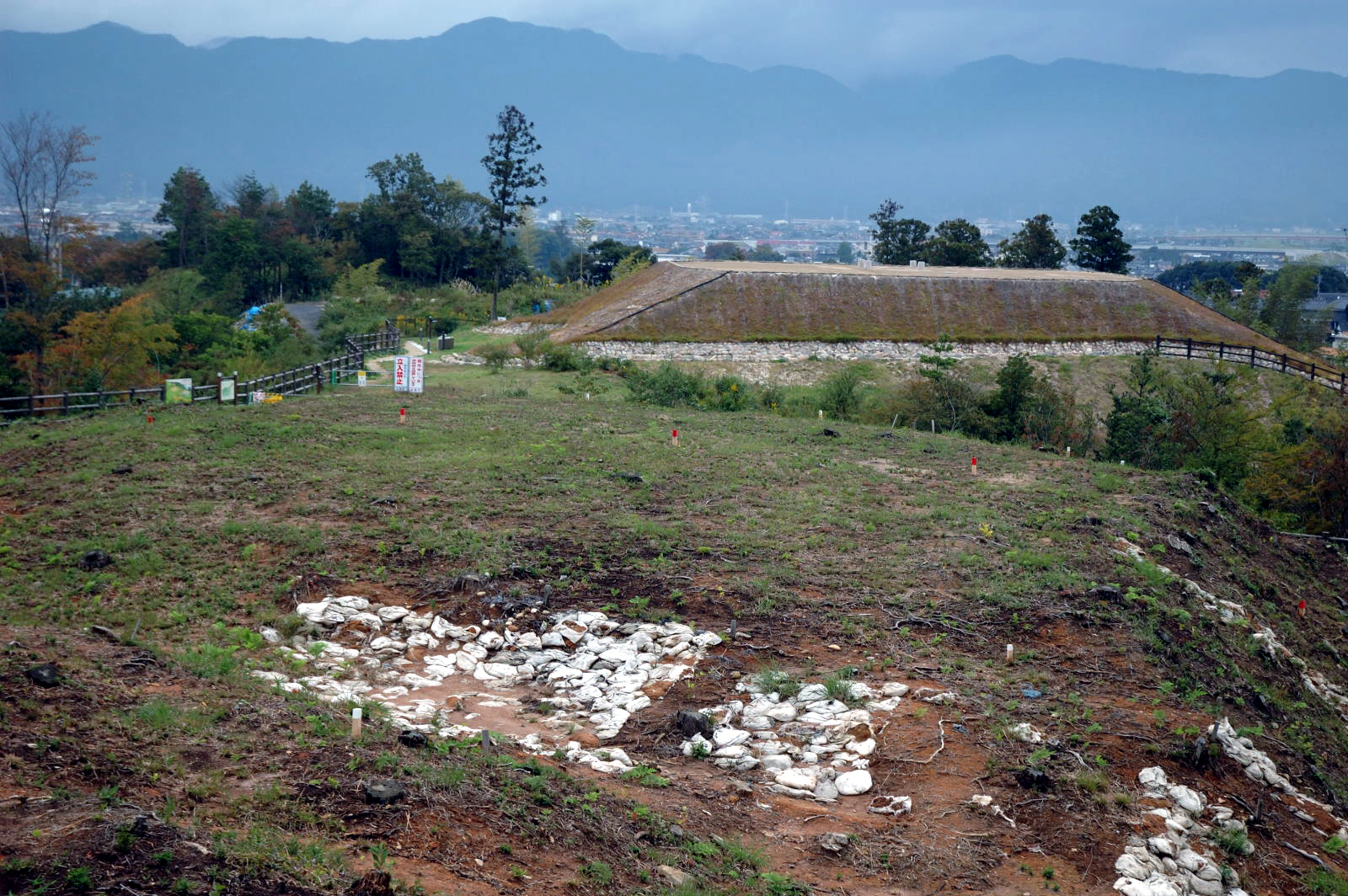
- Nishidani Kofun cluster

- Nishidani Kofun cluster Nishidani Tumulus cluster (Japan)
- Interactive map of Nishidani Kofun cluster
- 35°21′31″N 132°46′48″E
- Type: kofun
- Periods: Yayoi period
- Location: Izumo, Shimane, Shimane Prefecture Japan
- Region: San'in region

History
- Built: c. 4th to 6th century AD

Site notes
- Public access: Park, Museum

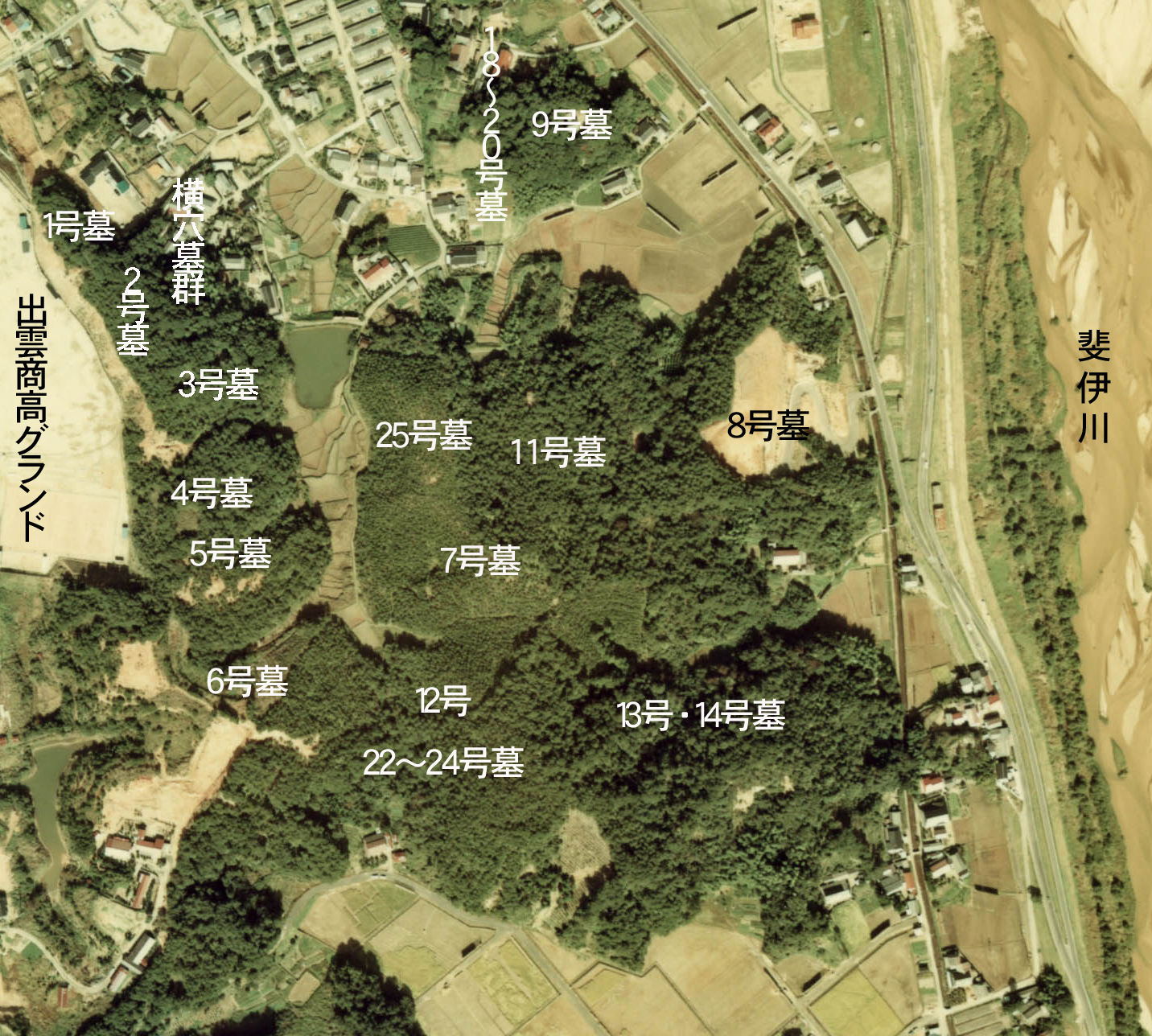
Nishidani kofun cluster

The Nishidani Kofun cluster (西谷墳墓群) is a group of late Yayoi period to early Kofun period burial mounds located in the Otsu-cho neighborhood of the city of Izumo, Shimane Prefecture in the San'in region of Japan. The tumulus group was designated a National Historic Site of Japan in 2000.

== Overview ==
The Nishidani tumulus cluster is located on the Nishidani Hills facing the Hii River at an elevation of 40 meters, in the southeastern part of Izumo city. It consists of six Yosumi-tosshutsu-gata (四隅突出形)-style tumuli. This is a variation of the hōfun (方墳)-style square tumulus with polygonal-shaped protrusions on each of its four corners, a shape unique to the San'in region, as well as a number of other tumuli including 17 square hōfun and 4 circular empun (円墳) tombs.

In 1953, a large amount of Yayoi pottery was discovered near what was later designated Tomb No. 4, by students of Izumo City Daiichi Junior High School and the existence of the ruins became clear for the first time. Archaeological excavations have so far confirmed a total of 32 graves, including 27 burial mounds, 5 earthen pit graves, and 5 sarcophagus graves. These were built from the Yayoi period into the Kofun period, and the ones that attracted particular attention were Tombs 1 to 4, Tomb 6, and Tomb 9, which were built on the hills to the west and north, all of which were four-cornered mounds. Tomb No. 3 and Tomb No. 9 are particularly large, measuring 50 meters including the protruding parts, and are thought to be the tombs of the kings who ruled this region in the late Yayoi period. In the main part of Tomb No. 3, a double-layered wooden coffin made from a large amount of mercury vermilion was excavated from two burial chambers, and grave goods including magatama, cylindrical and spherical beads, and iron swords were found inside these coffins. Traces of the burial pit being backfilled and four gigantic pillars erected have also been found, indicating that funerary rituals using a large amount of earthenware were performed. In addition, the grave goods in Tombs 3 and 4 include a style of trapezoid pottery unique to the Kibi region (Okayama Prefecture and eastern Hiroshima Prefecture), indicating that there was trade with the San'yō region of Japan. That seems to be the case. The site is near the Imaichi Dainenji Kofun and the Kamienyatsukiyama Kofun.

Currently, the site is maintained and opened to the public as the Nishitani Tomb Group Historical Site Park "Izumo Yayoi no Mori" (西谷墳墓群史跡公園・出雲弥生の森), located approximately 10 minutes by car from Izumoshi Station on the JR West San'in Main Line.

== See also ==
- List of Historic Sites of Japan (Shimane)
