= Fukiishi =

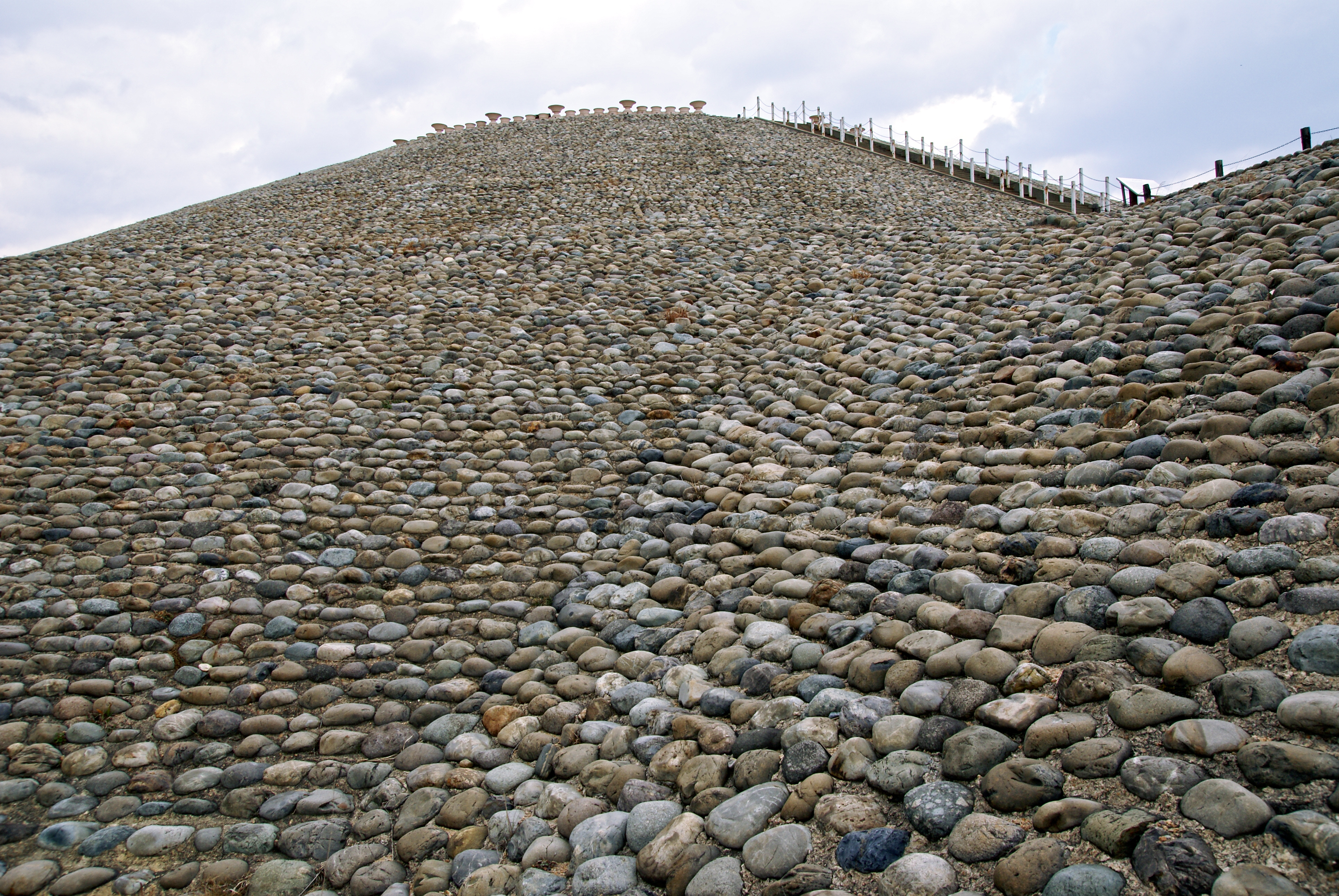
The round end of Goshikizuka Kofun in Kobe covered with restored fukiishi

Fukiishi (葺石 or 葺き石 "roofing stone") were a means of covering burial chambers and burial mounds during the kofun period of Japan (c. 250–538). Stones collected from riverbeds were affixed to the slopes of raised kofun and other burial chambers. They are considered to have descended from forms used in Yayoi-period tumuli. They are common in the early and mid-Kofun periods, but most late Kofun-period tumuli do not have them.

== Origin and ancestry ==
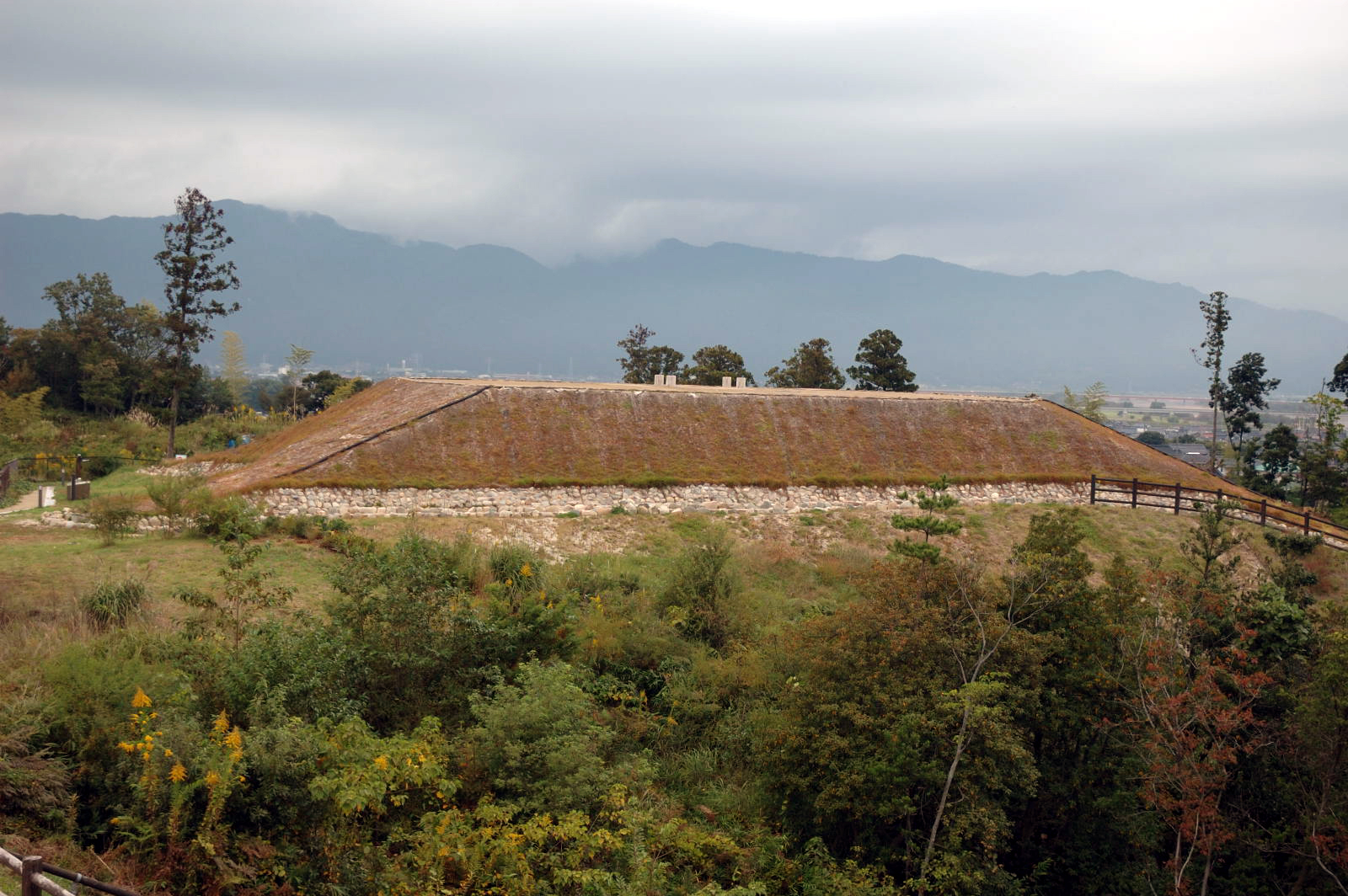
What are thought to be proto-fukiishi at Nishidani kofun No. 3 in Izumo, Shimane

Tombs covered with fukiishi appear sporadically in Western Japan from the mid-Yayoi period and continue into the Kofun period. Fukiishi are thought to be one element of the characteristics of the period of kofun at the time that they were making their first appearance; what are thought of as the oldest examples of what was to lead the generally fixed form are seen at Hashihaka Kofun and the presumed slightly older Hokenoyama Kofun in the city of Sakurai in Nara Prefecture. Neither fukiishi nor haniwa accompany mounds from before regularization such as at the Makimuku keyhole-shaped kofun group.

The hariishi (貼石) seen at the Yosumi Tosshutsu funkyūbo ("four corner projections type grave mound") in the San'in region in Western Japan are often put forth as an ancestor of fukiishi. The perimeter of the foot of kofun No. 3 of Nishidani Tumulus cluster in Izumo in Shimane Prefecture is completely covered with hariishi. The burial mound at the Tatetsuki archaeological site in the city of Sōja in Okayama Prefecture is surrounded with rows of stones; such examples are widely seen in the San'in and the nearby San'yō regions, where examples of burial mounds demarcated by stacks of stone walls are also seen.

== Terminology ==
In his report on an excavation in 1915 on mound No. 21 of Saitobaru kofungun burial mound group in what is now the city of Saito in Miyazaki Prefecture, historian Ryū Imanishi titled an entry hyōmen no fukiishi ("surface roofing stones") (Note: 表面の葺石 hyōmen no fukiishi "surface roofing stones") in which he described the condition of the fukiishi in a ground plan and cross-section.

The term fukiishi came into use as an archaeological term largely due to the influence of Kenji Takahashi's book Kofun to jōbunka ("Kofun and ancient culture", 1922). Via examples of kofun in the Kinai capital region Takashi described the fukiishi there as serving both practical and decorative purposes: in practical terms the use of pebbles provided protection from the wind, rain, and cold, while the stones served to beautify the mound which was after all built above ground to attract public attention and to impress and rouse piety in visiting worshippers.

== Research ==
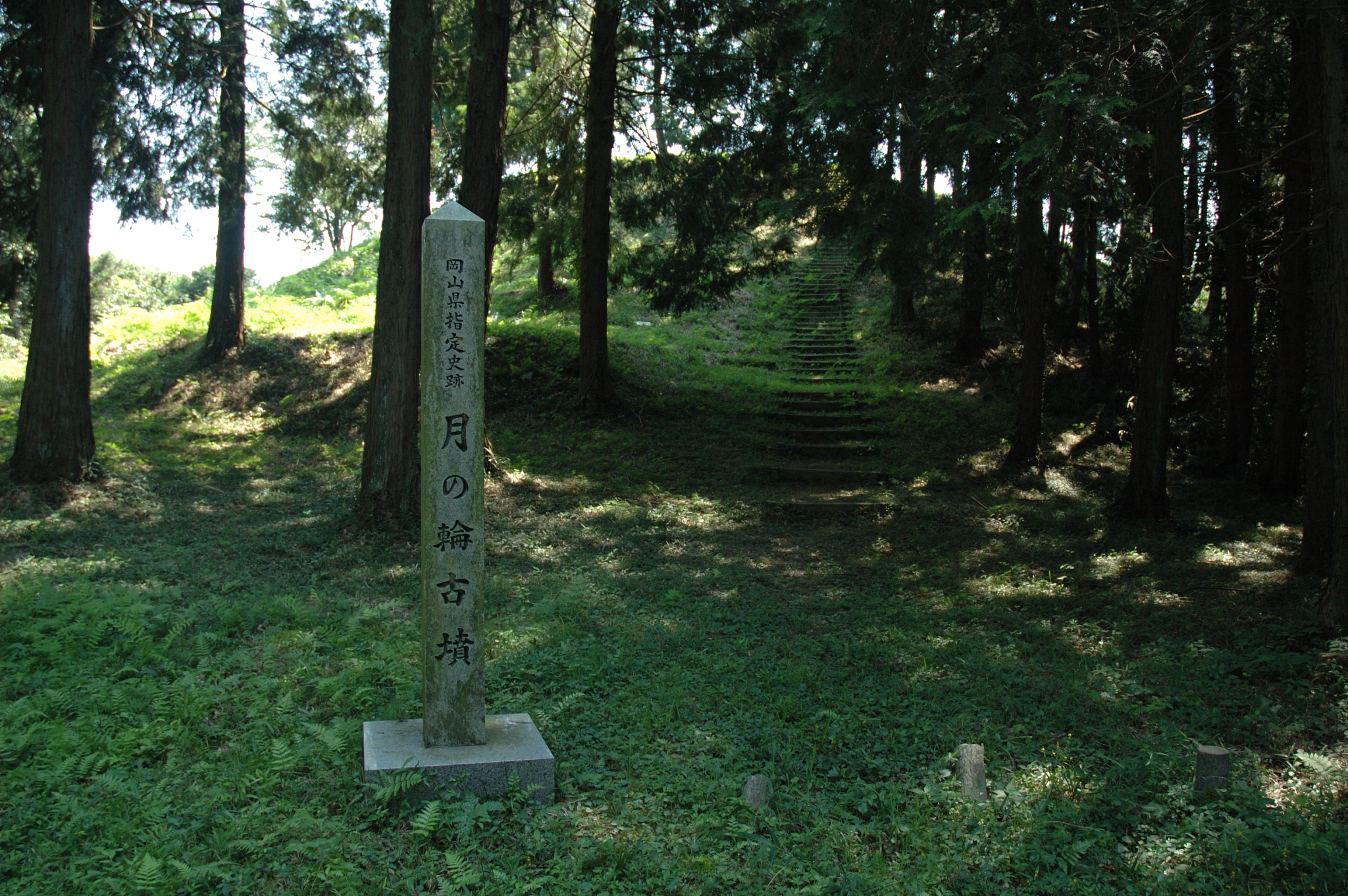
Tsukinowa kofun in Misaki, Okayama Prefecture

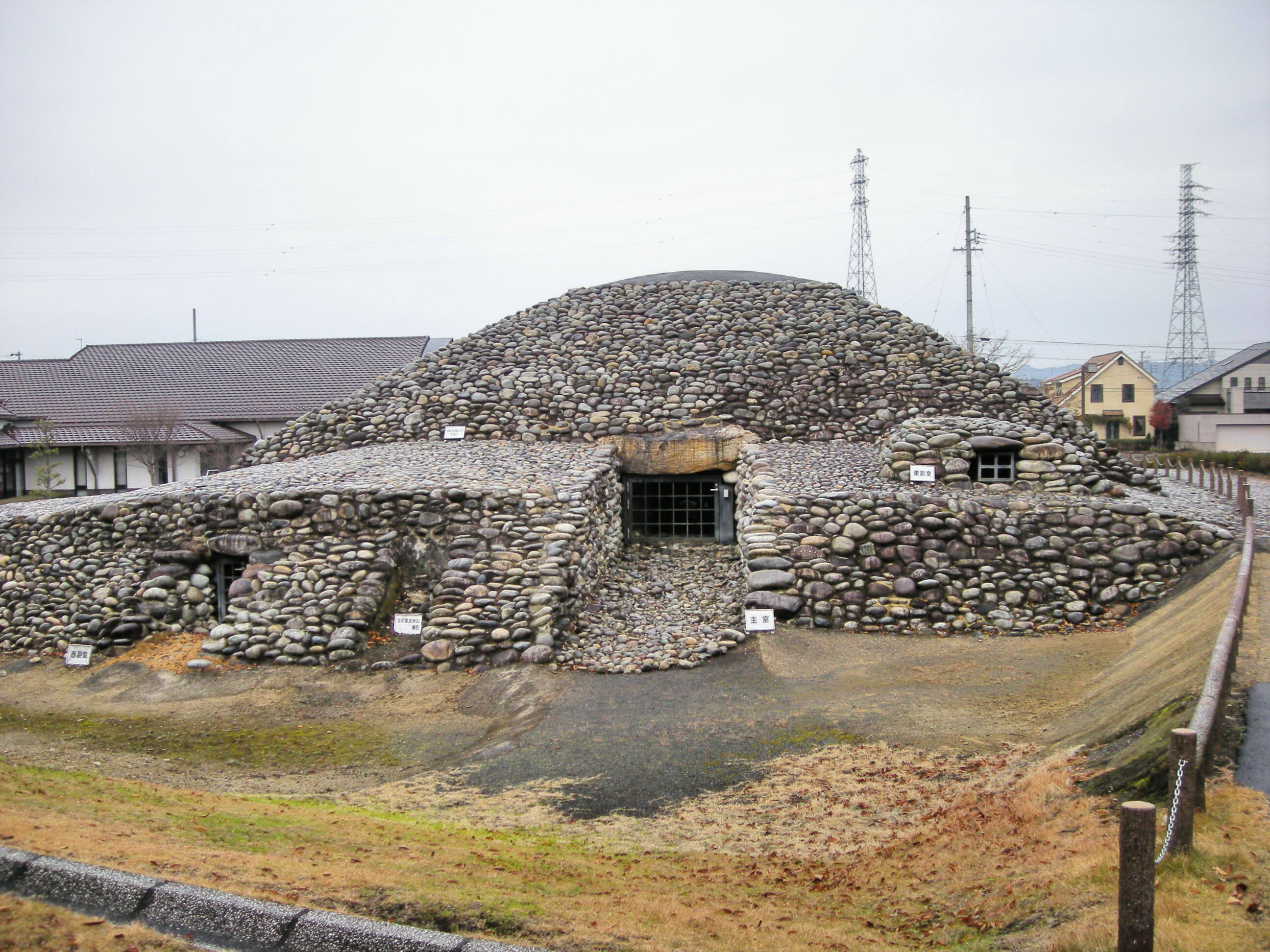
Jirobēzuka mound No. 1 in Kani in Gifu Prefecture is roofed with fukiishi made up of riverbed stones.

Excavation of fukiishi themselves was nearly nonexistent before World War II. It was only after the war that scientific examination, verification, and surveying of the stones took place.

In 1953, Yoshirō Kondō led a group of specialists, locals, and students in an excavation at the Tsukinowa kofun in Misaki (Note: At the time named Yūkason) in Okayama. The group surveyed three quarters of the kofun, with a height of 10 m and a diameter of 60 m. The report published in 1960 gave the extent of distribution, shape and size, petrological analysis, technical analysis of the roofing method, and minute illustration the configuration of the individual stones. The report estimated the number of stones at about 80,000.

In response to the rapid increase in the post-war period of large-scale development that led to in the destruction of historical ruins, urgent excavations were carried out with the goal of thorough examination rather than as the preservation of documentation. As a result of this early research, Shōzō Haraguchi and Tadashi Nishitani published a paper in 1967 on the excavation of tumulus C1 of the Bentenyama kofungun group in Takatsuki in Osaka. The paper notes the results of investigation into the stacking methods, the weight and number of stones per unit area, the collection areas and transportation routes of the stones, and other details. Tadashi Aoki stated that following this report hardly any other resulting from such an accumulation of verifiable details on fukiishi has appeared.

Research into fukiishi has come to require knowledge related to construction technology. To enable the scientific qualification and quantification of research documentation, Hisanori Ishizuka has called for research on:

1. Palaeoecology
2. Soil mechanics
3. Structural engineering
4. Materials
5. Fukiishi construction
6. Structural masonry

== Materials and construction methods ==
The material for fukiishi was often made up of pebbles and stones from dry riverbeds. In the case of pebbles, a variety of stones was used. For example, the late-4th-century Matsuokayama Kofun in Kashiwara in Osaka Prefecture was made with andesite flagstones in vertical or sloped piles. Other sites used chert, sandstone, slate, basalt, or other types of stone.

Embankments were often made with soil transported from other areas. Pollen analysis of the fifth- and sixth-century kofuns of the Kuboizumi-Maruyama Historic Sites in Saga has shown clear disparities in the vegetation in the soil of the mound faces and that of the surrounding environment. This example suggests that the borrow pits for the construction of the mounds were in remote locations.

=== Stone Building Methods ===
Among different methods of stone tomb construction, it was found that there are four different classifications of burial mound structures.

==== Type 1 ====
These buildings include a stacked stone wall with thick backfill and lack a base stone in the construction. The typical examples of burials in this style are Nakayama Otsuka Kofun (Nara Prefecture Tenri City), Hokeno Mountain Burial Mound (Sakurai City, Nara Prefecture), and in the rear section of the former Inari Tomaru, Kyoto, these are the oldest structures still present in Yamato.

==== Type 2 ====
This construction method is characterized by the dual-staged stacking of the stone base. The basal stone is stacked horizontally and the subsequent masonry is stacked on top. These mounds tend to exhibit steep inclines of 30 degrees or more. Prime examples of this type of burial mound are found in Red Tsuchiyama Tumulus in the Tenri City of Nara Prefecture and Xizhiduka Mound and the Miwa Mountain Burial Mound 1 in Tsuyama City Okayama Prefecture.

==== Class 3-1 ====
"Stacking Stone" is the classification of this type of stone, the basement stones are overlapped with the main body of the structure. The Benten Mountain Mound (C1) in Takatsuki City, Osaka Prefecture is a representative example of this style of mound building.

==== Class 3-2 ====
This type of burial mound does not stack stone layers over the foundation. Instead, the stones are embedded in the soil in a method referred to as "pasting stones".

==== Class 3-3 ====
Construction technology changes as current methods fuse with local methods. Examples of this can be found in Kashiwabara City at Mt Tama 1 and Tama 7 (Tamane Mountain Burial Mounds).

==== Class 4 ====
This method of construction follows the "paste stone" method in Class 3–2. Mounds generally displays shallow inclines of 20-25 degrees. The mounds consist mostly of small stones with gravel filled gaps; which is generally found in the Saki Gouzanyama Kofun (Saki Gouran Mountain Burial Mound) in Nara City, Nara Prefecture.

== Purpose and function ==
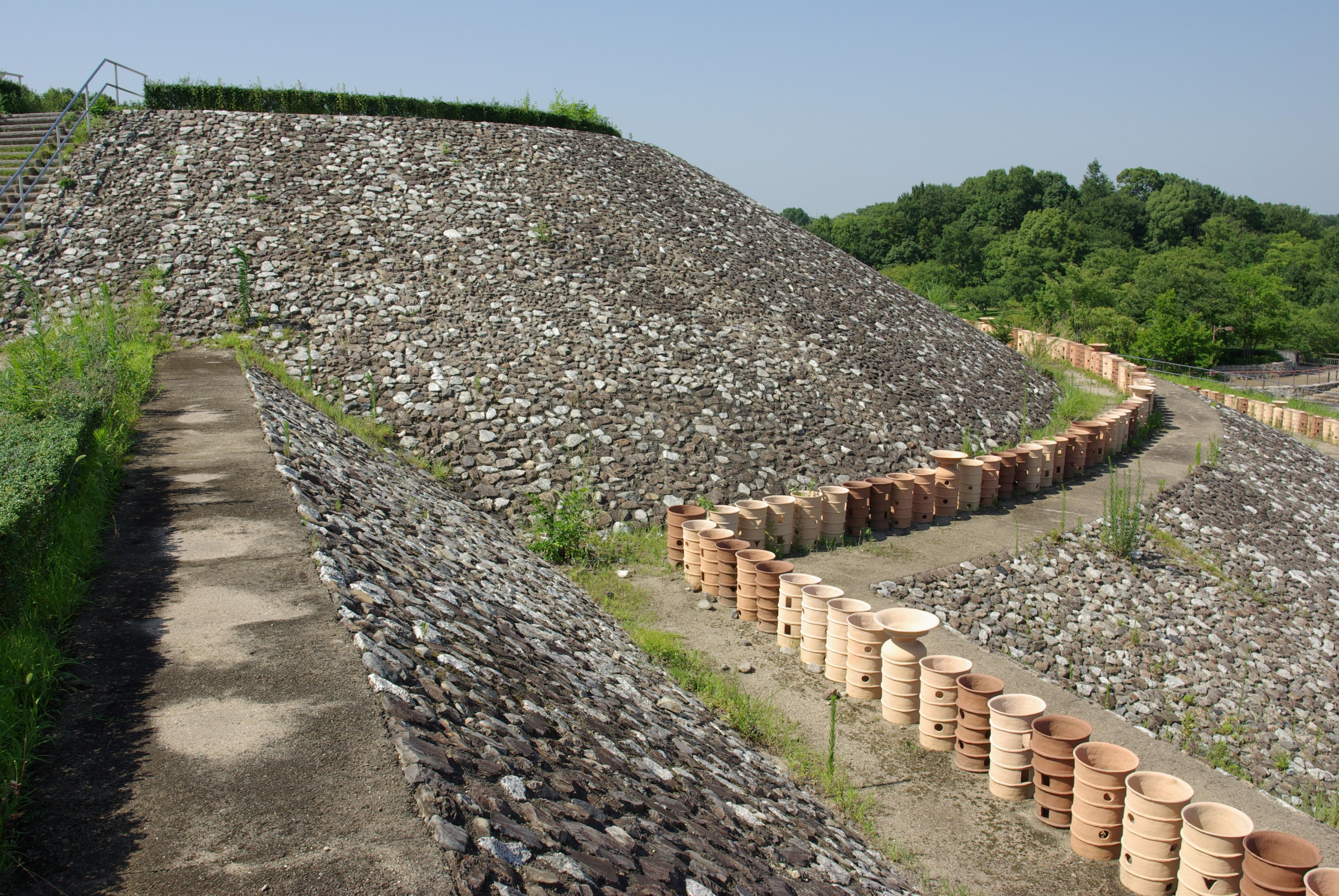
The early 5th-century Nagare-san kofun, of the Umami kofungun group in Kawai in Nara Prefecture Half of the restored mound is covered with fukiishi.

The purpose of fukiishi is seen, as in Kenji Takahashi's account of 1922, to protect the burial mound while projecting its majesty. As they were used primarily on slopes and rarely on flat surfaces it is also thought they may have served to prevent runoff, and may have contributed to waterproofing and drainage. They may also have been used to imply the mound was sacred, holy ground and clearly differentiate it from adjacent areas. Archaeologist Kazuo Hirose notes the use of fukiishi may be related to a desire to make royalty visible and exhibit the people's connection with royalty, a feature he sees as characteristic of Japanese burial mounds in comparison with those of other Asian countries, and in particular in the case of keyhole-shaped kofun.

== Demise ==
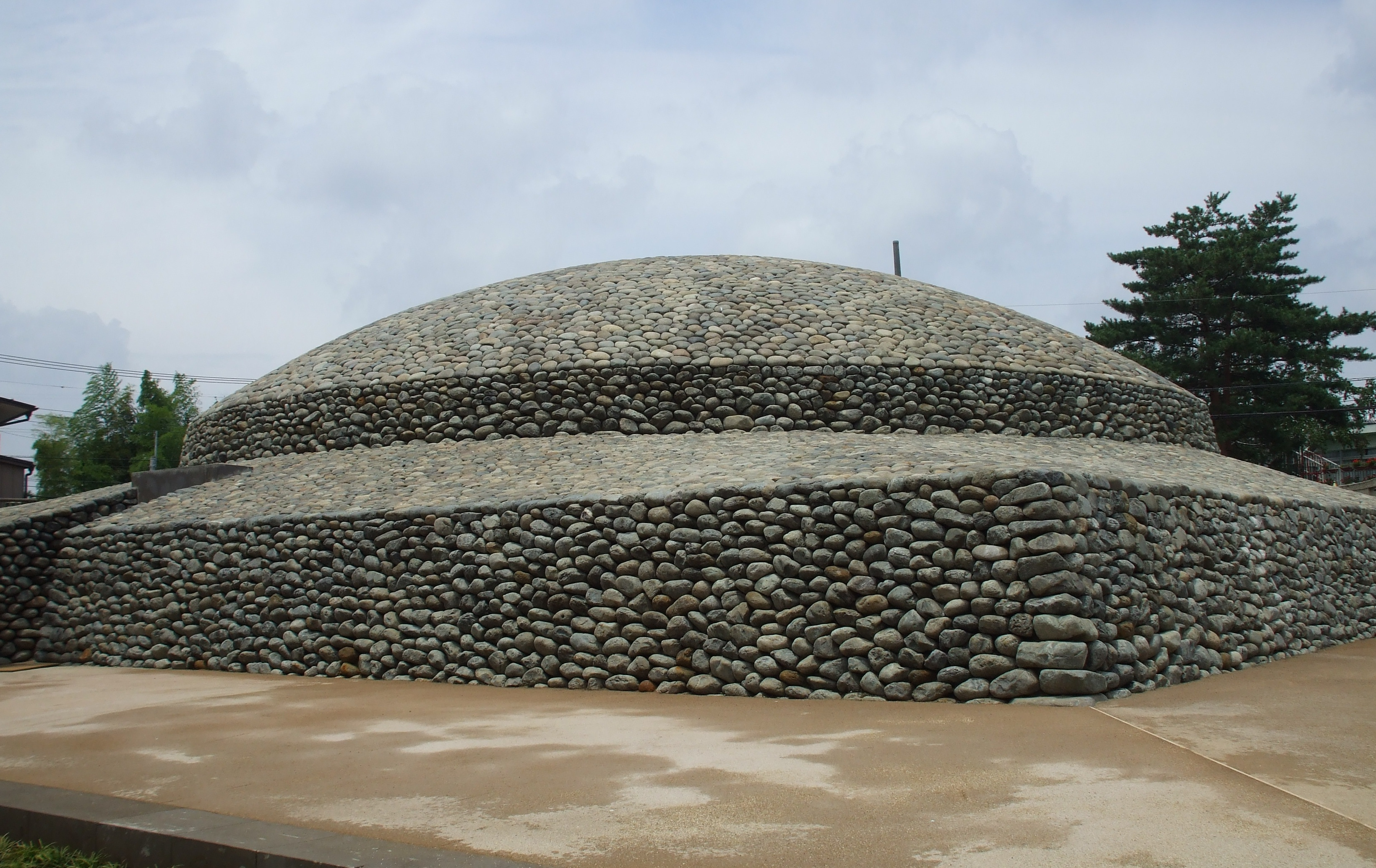
Restored kofun at Kumano shrine in Fuchū in Tokyo

The scale of kofun construction peaked in the middle of the Kofun period in the mid-5th century, reflecting the power and influence of the political structure and the social status of the entombed via the form and scale of the tumuli. Towards the close of the 5th century, the construction of large keyhole-shaped kofun and groups of layered kofun waned.

At the beginning of the 6th century, the scale of most keyhole-shaped kofun west from the Kantō region became smaller, the smaller Baichō ("satellite") tumuli began to disappear, and fukiishi began to be used infrequently. Three-tiered kofun saw a strong decrease in favour of two-tiered ones. Outside of the Kantō region, haniwa stopped being used. From the end of the 6th century to the beginning of the 7th, the tumuli of the monarchs changed from square hōfun tumuli to octagonal hakkaku-fun tumuli. Amongst these, jōenkahōfun dome-shaped grave mounds made with fukiishi, such as Musashi Fuchū Kumano Jinja Kofun in Fuchū in Tokyo, are noteworthy. Nevertheless, during this era kofun were quickly ceding the role of central ritual building to Buddhist temples, and the adoption of rammed earth construction techniques stands out.

With regards to kofun of the final period, gaigo resseki (Note: 外護列石) stones lined up to trace the line of the mound are recognized, and what could be called fukiishi are almost never seen. Gaigo resseki were not piled on the mounds as fukiishi were, nor were the construction techniques of fukiishi applied to them. Aoki has pointed out that this was modeled on the decoration techniques of the foundations of Buddhist temples.

== Gallery ==
Burial mounds with fukiishi

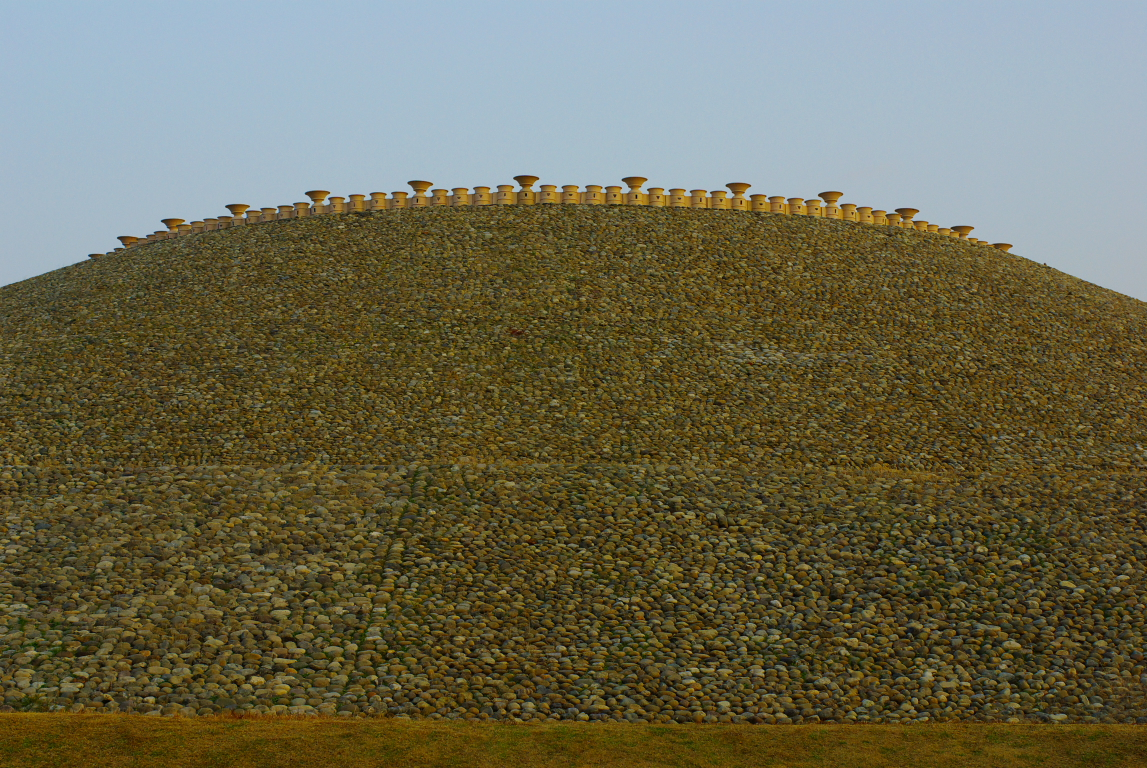
Goshikizuka in the evening

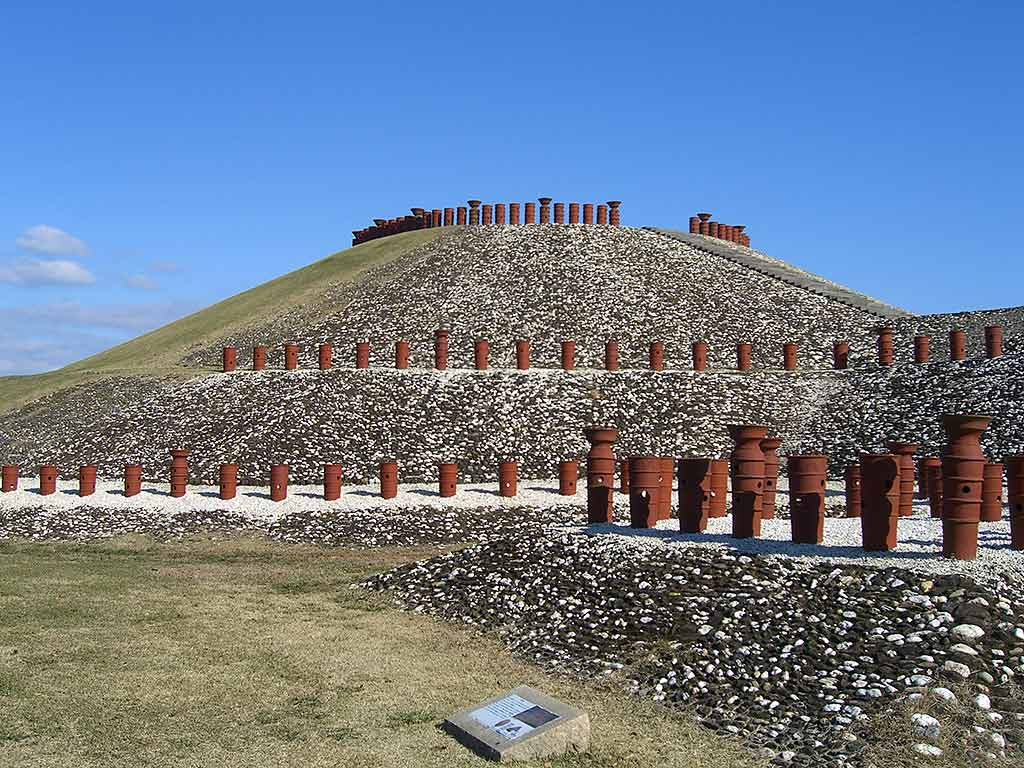
Restored Kamezuka Kofun in Ōita

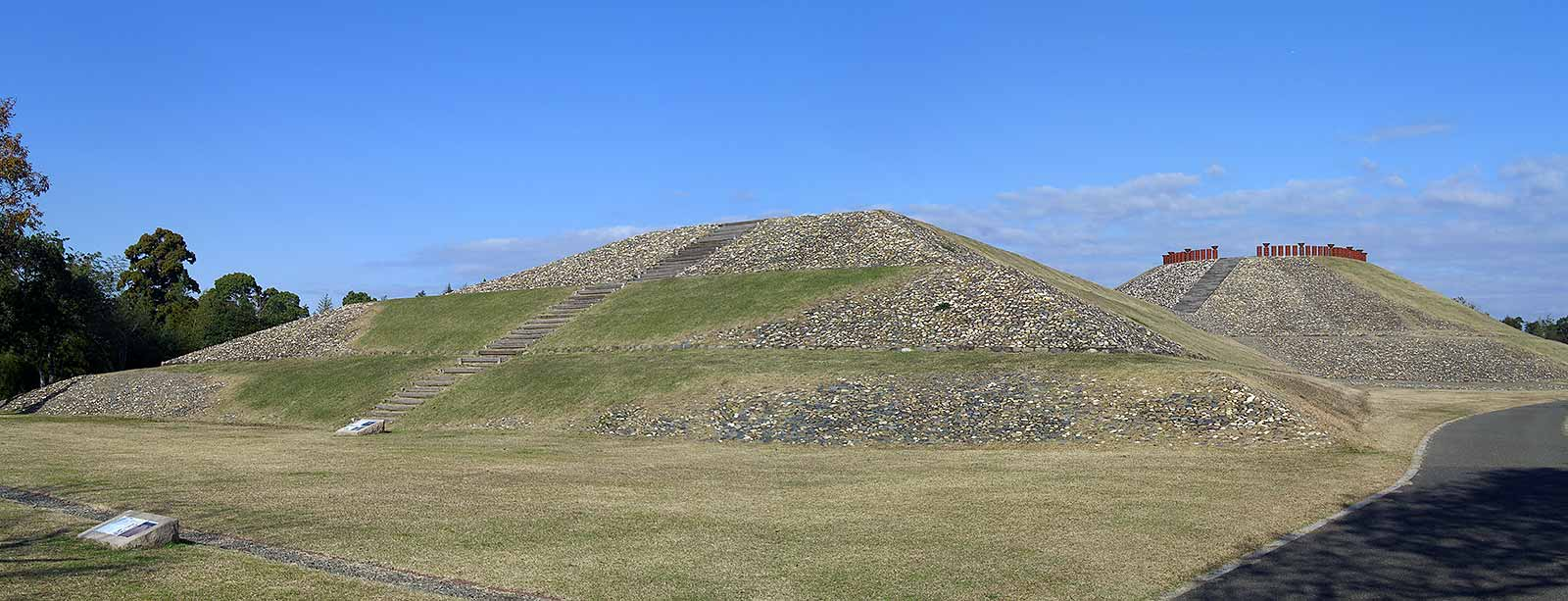
Kamezuka from the south

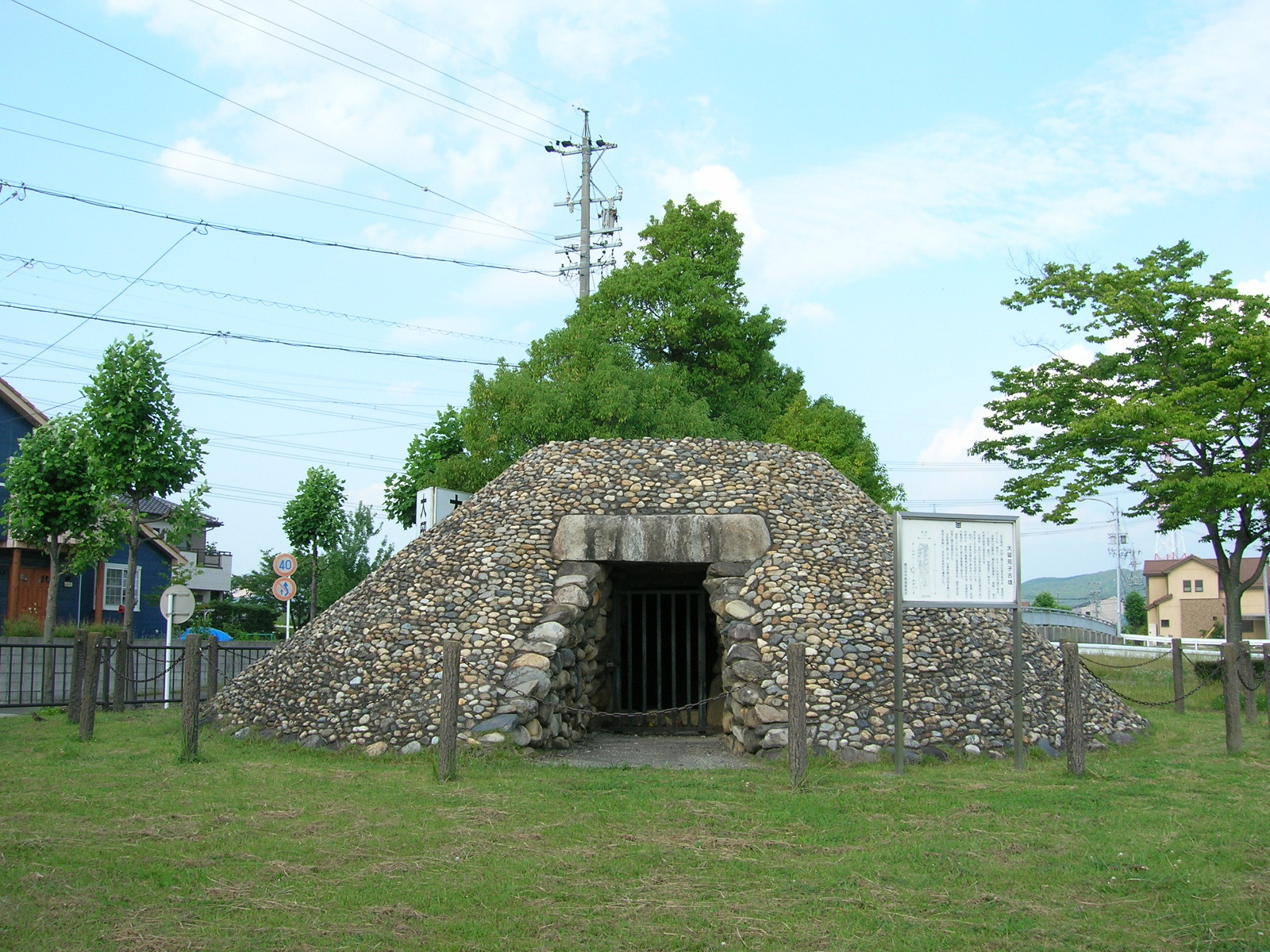
Restored Ōdome Arako Kofun in Kasugai, Aichi

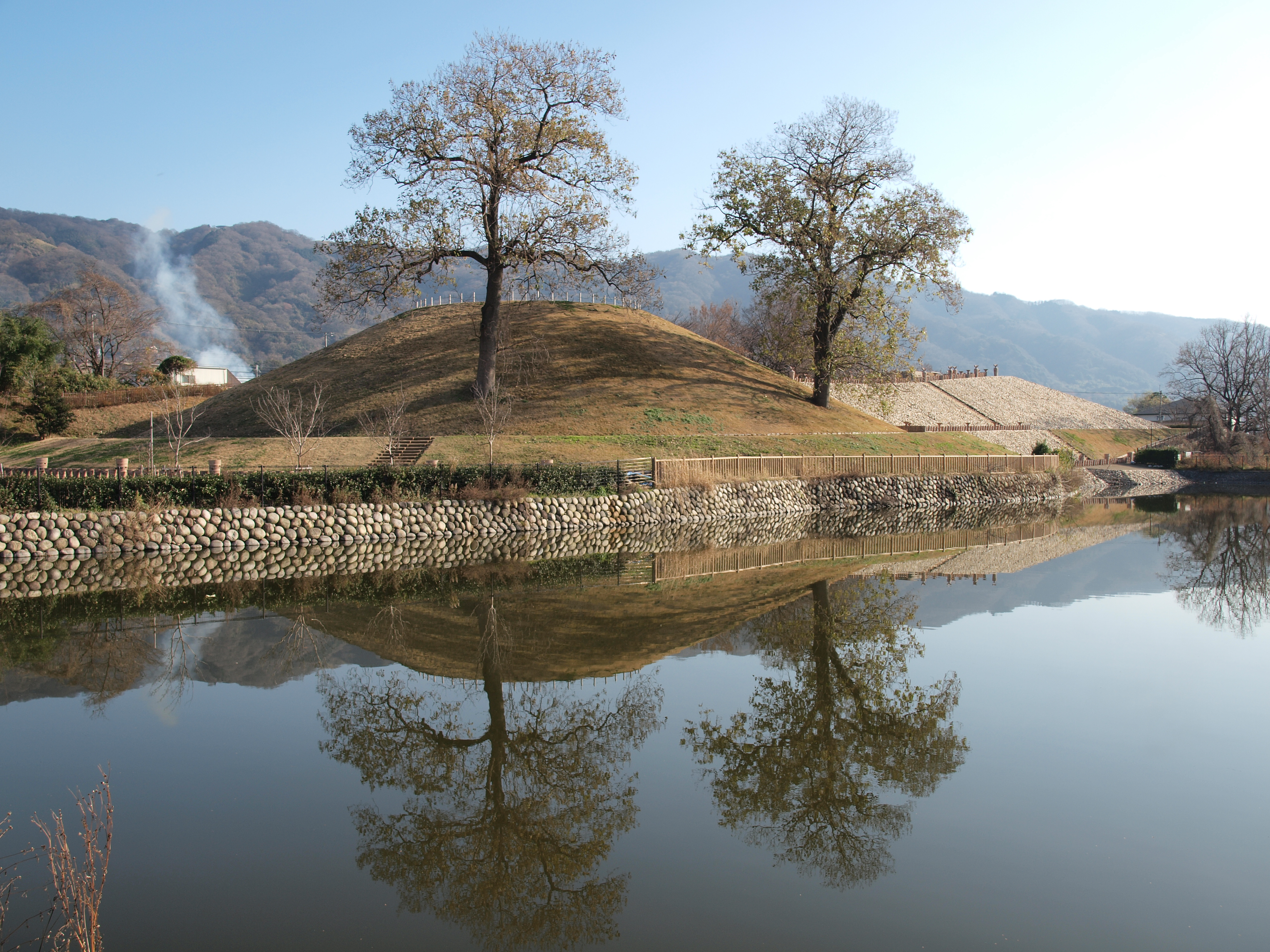
Shionjiyama Kofun in Osaka

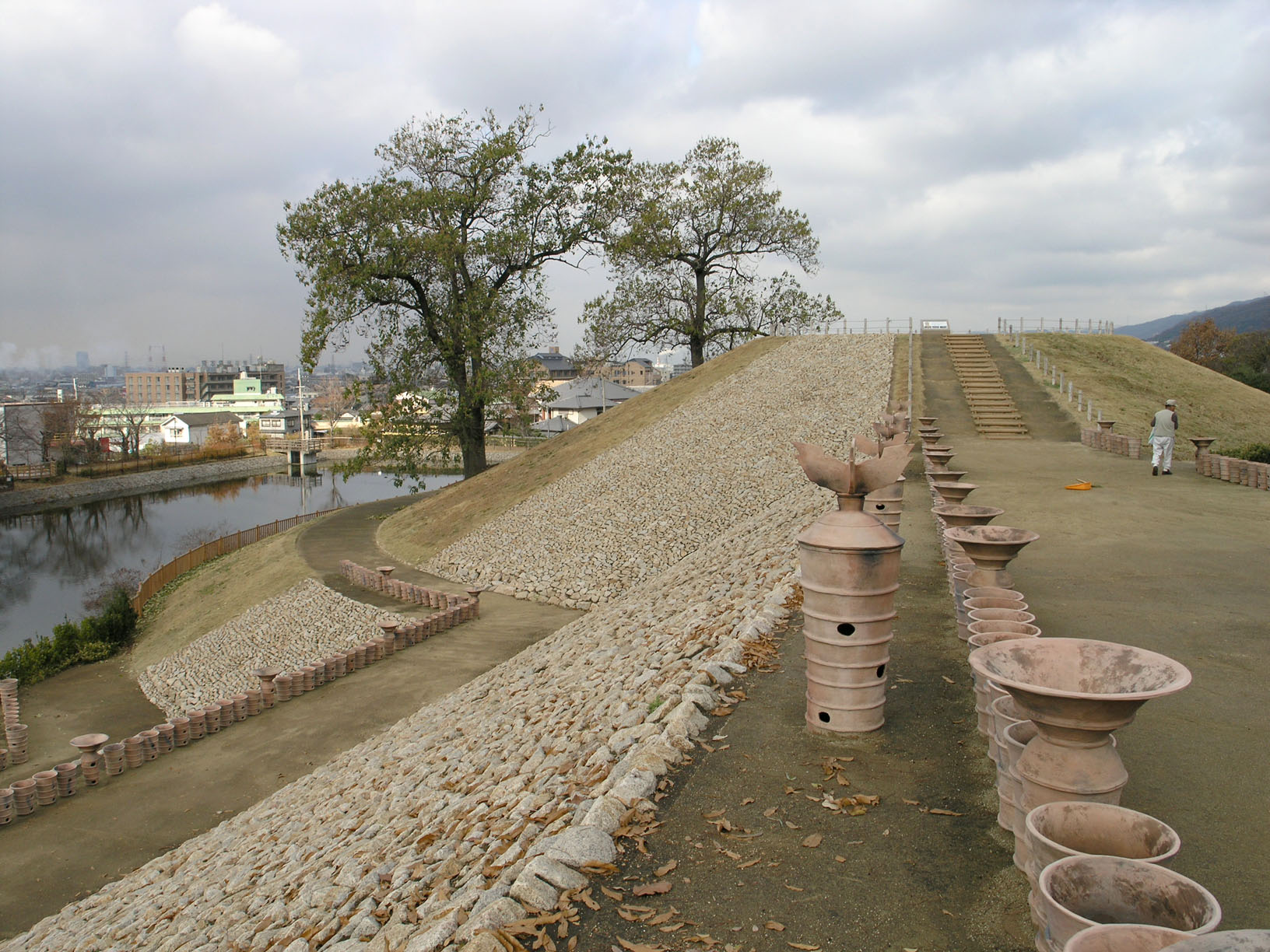
Shionjiyama Kofun

== Works cited ==
- Aoki, Takashi (2003). Kofun chikuzō no kenkyū—funkyū kara mita kofun no chiikisei 古墳築造の研究－墳丘からみた古墳の地域性－ [Research on the construction of kofun]. Rokuichi Shobō. ISBN 4-947743-16-6.
- Haraguchi, Shōzō; Nishitani, Tadashi (1967). "弁天山C1号墳". Bentenyama kofungun no chōsa 弁天山古墳群の調査 [Research on Bentenyama kofungun]. Ōsaka-fu kyōiku iinkai.
- Hirose, Kazuo (2003). Zenpō-kōen-fun kokka 前方後円墳国家 [Keyhole-shaped kifun nation]. Kadokawa Shoten. ISBN 4-04-703355-3.
- Ishino, Hironobu (1990). Kofun Jidai-shi 古墳時代史 [History of the Kofun Period]. Yuzankaku. ISBN 4-639-01888-6.
- Ishino, Hironobu, ed. (1992). Kofun jidai no kenkyū 7 Kofun 1 Funkyū to naibu kōzō 古墳時代の研究7 古墳I 墳丘と内部構造 [Kofun period research 7 Kofun 1 Burial mounds and their inner structure]. Vol. 7. 図版: Yuzankaku. ISBN 4-639-00960-7.
- Ishizuka, Hisanori (1992). "3 外部施設 2 葺石". Kofun jidai no kenkyū 7 Kofun 1 Funkyū to naibu kōzō 古墳時代の研究7 古墳I 墳丘と内部構造 [Kofun period research 7 Kofun 1 Burial mounds and their inner structure]. Yuzankaku. ISBN 4-639-00960-7.
- Iwasaki, Takuya (1992). "1 総論". In Ishino, Hironobu (ed.). Kofun jidai no kenkyū 7 Kofun 1 Funkyū to naibu kōzō 古墳時代の研究7 古墳I 墳丘と内部構造 [Kofun period research 7 Kofun 1 Burial mounds and their inner structure]. Vol. 7. 図版: Yuzankaku. ISBN 4-639-00960-7.
- Kondō, Yoshirō (2001). Zenpō-kōen-fun ni manabu 前方後円墳に学ぶ [Learning from keyhole-shaped kofun]. Yamakawa Shuppansha. ISBN 4-634-60490-6.
- Mori, Kōichi (1985). Kyodai kofun—Zenpō-kōen-fun no nazo wo toku 巨大古墳—前方後円墳の謎を解く [Giant kofun—solving the mystery of the keyhole-shaped kofun]. Sōshisha. ISBN 4-7942-0220-2.
- Mori, Kōichi (1986a). "「ヤマト古墳文化の成立」". In Mori, Kōichi (ed.). Nihon no kodai 5: Zenpō-kōen-fun no seiki 日本の古代5 前方後円墳の世紀 [Ancient Japan 5: The era of keyhole-shaped kofun]. Chūō Kōronsha. pp. 225–274. ISBN 4-12-402538-6.
- Mori, Kōichi (1986b). "「海と陸のあいだの前方後円墳」". In Mori, Kōichi (ed.). Nihon no kodai 5: Zenpō-kōen-fun no seiki 日本の古代5 前方後円墳の世紀 [Ancient Japan 5: The era of keyhole-shaped kofun]. Chūō Kōronsha. pp. 275–300. ISBN 4-12-402538-6.
- Niiro, Izumi (1992). "V古墳時代 2古墳 a前・中期". Zukai Nihon no jinrui iseki 図解･日本の人類遺跡. Tokyo Diagaku Shuppankai. ISBN 4-13-026200-9.
- Ōtsuka, Hatushige; Kobayashi, Saburō (1982). Kofun Jiten 古墳辞典 [Kofun Dictionary]. Tokyo-dō Publishing. ISBN 4-490-10165-1.
- Shiraishi, Taichirō (2002). Nihon no Jidai-shi: Wakoku Tanjō 「倭国誕生」白石編『日本の時代史1 倭国誕生』 [Period History of Japan: Birth of Wakoku]. Vol. 1. Yoshikawa Kōbunkan. ISBN 4-642-00801-2.
