= List of mergers in Shimane Prefecture =

Here is a list of mergers in Shimane Prefecture, Japan, during the Heisei era.

== 2004 to 2011 ==
- On October 1, 2004 - the town of Saigō, and the villages of Fuse, Goka and Tsuma (all from Oki District) were merged to create the town of Okinoshima.
- On October 1, 2004 - the towns of Iwami and Mizuho, and the village of Hasumi (all from Ōchi District) were merged to create the town of Ōnan.
- On October 1, 2004 - the town of Ōchi, and the village of Daiwa (both from Ōchi District) were merged to create the town of Misato.
- On October 1, 2004 - the town of Sakurae (from Ōchi District) was merged into the expanded city of Gōtsu.
- On October 1, 2004 - the old city of Yasugi absorbed the towns of Hakuta and Hirose (both from Nogi District) to create the new and expanded city of Yasugi. Nogi District was dissolved as a result.
- On November 1, 2004 - the towns of Daitō, Kamo and Kisuki (all from Ōhara District), and the towns of Kakeya and Mitoya, and the village of Yoshida (all from Iishi District) were merged to create the city of Unnan. Ōhara District was dissolved as a result of this merger.
- On November 1, 2004 - the towns of Hikimi and Mito (both from Mino District) were merged into the expanded city of Masuda. Mino District was dissolved as a result of this merger.
- On January 1, 2005 - the towns of Akagi and Tonbara (both from Iishi District) were merged to create the town of Iinan.
- On March 22, 2005 - the old city of Izumo absorbed the city of Hirata, and the towns of Koryō, Sada, Taisha and Taki (all from Hikawa District) to create the new and expanded city of Izumo.
- On January 31, 2005 - the towns of Nita and Yokota (both from Nita District) were merged to create the town of Okuizumo.
- On March 31, 2005 - the old city of Matsue absorbed the towns of Kashima, Mihonoseki, Shimane, Shinji, Tamayu and Yatsuka, and the village of Yakumo (all from Yatsuka District) to create the new and expanded city of Matsue.
- On September 25, 2005 - the town of Nichihara (from Kanoashi District) was merged into the expanded town of Tsuwano.
- On October 1, 2005 - the village of Kakinoki, and the town of Muikaichi (both from Kanoashi District) were merged to create the town of Yoshika.
- On October 1, 2005 - the old city of Ōda absorbed the towns of Nima and Yunotsu (both from Nima District) to create the new and expanded city of Ōda. Nima District was dissolved as a result of this merger.
- On October 1, 2005 - the old city of Hamada absorbed the towns of Asahi, Kanagi, Misumi and Yasaka (all from Naka District) to create the new and expanded city of Hamada. Naka District was dissolved as a result of this merger.
- On August 1, 2011 - the town of Higashiizumo (from Yatsuka District) was merged into the expanded city of Matsue. Yatsuka District was dissolved as a result of this merger.
- On October 1, 2011 - the town of Hikawa (from Hikawa District) was merged into the expanded city of Izumo. Hikawa District was dissolved as a result of this merger.
