= Ōbaniwatorizuka Tumulus =

Kofun period burial mound in Matsue, Japan

Ōbaniwatorizuka
- 大庭鶏塚古墳 (Japanese)
- Ōbaniwatorizuka Ōbaniwatorizuka Tumulus (Japan)
- Interactive map of Ōbaniwatorizuka
- 35°26′16″N 133°05′08″E
- Type: Kofun
- Periods: Kofun period
- Location: Matsue, Shimane, Japan
- Region: San'in region

History
- Built: c.6th century

Site notes
- Public access: Yes (no facilities)

Oba Niwatorizuka Kofun in Matsue, Shimane, Japan

The Ōbaniwatorizuka (大庭鶏塚古墳) is a Kofun period burial mound, located on the border of the Ōba-chō neighborhood of the city of Matsue, Shimane in the San'in region of Japan. The tumulus was designated a National Historic Site of Japan in 1924.

== Overview ==
The Ōbaniwatorizuka is a rectangular hōfun (方墳)-style burial mound, approximately 42 meters on each side, and approximately 10 meters in height. It is built in two tiers, like a step pyramid, and has protruding trapezoidal platforms extending on the west and south sides. The tumulus was once surrounded by a moat. The sides of the tumulus have fukiishi, and shards of cylindrical haniwa have been found in the step between the upper and lower tiers. The internal structure is unknown as it has not been excavated; however, from the style and haniwa, it is believed to have been built in the first half of the 6th century. Together with the Yamashiro Futagozuka Kofun and Yamashiro hōfun, it forms the Yamashiro/Ōba Kofun cluster.

The tumulus about 4.8 kilometers (12 minutes by car) southeast from Matsue Station on the JR West San'in Main Line.

== See also ==
- List of Historic Sites of Japan (Shimane)
