= Yatsuka =

Yatsuka may refer to:

- Yatsuka District, Shimane, a former district in Shimane Prefecture, Japan
- Yatsuka, Shimane, a former town in Yatsuka District, Shimane Prefecture, Japan
- Yatsuka, Okayama, a former town in Maniwa District, Okayama Prefecture, Japan
- Yatsuka Station, a railway station in Sōka, Saitama Prefecture, Japan
- 7097 Yatsuka, a main-belt asteroid

== People with the given name ==
- Hozumi Yatsuka (穂積 八束; 1860–1912), Japanese political scientist
