= Sada-Kōbu Shell Mound =

Ancient shell midden in Matsue, Shimane, Japan

- 佐太・講武貝塚 (Japanese)
- Sada-Kōbu Shell Mound Sada-Kōbu Shell Mound (Japan)
- Interactive map of Sada-Kōbu Shell Mound
- 35°31′00″N 133°00′34″E
- Type: shell midden
- Periods: Jōmon period
- Location: Matsue, Shimane, Japan
- Region: San'in region

Site notes
- Public access: Yes (park)

The Sada-Kōbu Shell Mound (佐太・講武貝塚, Sada-Kōbu kaizuka) is an archaeological site in the Kashima-chō neighborhood of the city of Matsue, Shimane Prefecture, in the San'in region of western Japan. It contains a Jōmon period shell midden, and was designated a National Historic Site in 1933.

== Overview ==
During the early to middle Jōmon period (approximately 4000 to 2500 BC), sea levels were five to six meters higher than at present, and the ambient temperature was also 2 deg C higher. During this period the Jōmon people inhabited many coastal settlements. The middens associated with such settlements contain bone, botanical material, mollusc shells, sherds, lithics, and other artifacts and ecofacts associated with the now-vanished inhabitants, and these features, provide a useful source into the diets and habits of Jōmon society. Most of the 2400 known shell middens are found mostly along the Pacific coast of Japan.

The Sada-Kōbu Shell Mound is located about one kilometer upstream from the mouth of the Sada River, which connects Lake Shinji and the Sea of Japan, and extends from the foot of a hill to a lowland area. It has been known since antiquity and is also called the "Unada Shell Midden" (鵜灘貝塚). The shellfish layer, which is mainly made up of shijimi clams, turban shells, abalone, and other shellfish, is located at a low level between zero and three meters above sea level, and is about 20 meters long and one meter thick near the banks of the Sata River, extending up to the top of the hill near the shell midden. The midden is a valuable archaeological site as few shell middens exist in the San'in region. Other artifacts that hint at the diet of the time, such as fish bones, animal bones (wild boar, Sitka deer, Japanese macaques), and tree nuts. Early Jōmon pottery earthenware, some of which had a distinctive striped pattern with a round or slightly pointed bottom, and stone tools such as arrowheads, polished stones, and stone plates have been unearthed, including some objects made from obsidian from the Oki Islands. Based on the excavated items, the midden is estimated to date from the early to middle Jōmon period, or about 7000 to 6000 years ago. Also of interest was a portion of a human frontal cranium, with two holes drilled to form a pendant. Currently, the excavated items are stored and exhibited at the Kashima History and Folklore Museum, located next to Sata Shrine.

The midden is located next to Matsue City Kashima Junior High School, approximately 9.6 kilometers northeast of Matsue Station in the JR West San'in Main Line.

== See also ==
- List of Historic Sites of Japan (Shimane)
