= 美濃 =

美濃 may refer to:

- Meinong District, a district in Kaohsiung, Taiwan
- Mino, Gifu, a city in Gifu Prefecture
- Mino District, Shimane, a former district in Shimane Prefecture
- Mino Province, an old province in the southern part of Gifu Prefecture
