= Ixion Saga DT =

Japanese anime series

- Cover of the Blu-Ray Disc volume 1, featuring Kon Hokaze

イクシオン サーガ DT
- Genre: Action, fantasy comedy
- Anime television series
- Directed by: Shinji Takamatsu
- Written by: Akatsuki Yamatoya
- Music by: Junpei Fujita; Hitoshi Fujima
- Studio: Brain's Base
- Original network: TV Tokyo
- Original run: October 6, 2012 – March 30, 2013
- Episodes: 25
- Manga

Ixion Saga
- Written by: Yūsaku Komiyama
- Published by: Kodansha
- Magazine: Bessatsu Shōnen Magazine
- Original run: November 2012 – June 2013
- Volumes: 1
- Manga

Ixion Saga ED
- Written by: Futaba Hazuki
- Published by: Ichijinsha
- Magazine: Monthly Comic Zero Sum
- Original run: November 2012 – February 2014
- Volumes: 2
- Light novel

Ixion Saga Touzoku no Youheidan
- Written by: Gigiru Akiguchi
- Illustrated by: Kashiwa Miyako
- Published by: Kodansha
- Imprint: Kodansha Ranobe Bunko
- Published: November 2, 2012
- Volumes: 1

Ixion Saga Dimensional Transfer (イクシオン サーガ DT, Ikushion Sāga Dī Tī) is a Japanese anime television series based on the online game Ixion Saga by Capcom. It began airing on October 6, 2012, and ended on March 30, 2013. It also was adapted into two manga series and a light novel series.

== Plot ==
One day as Kon Hokaze is playing an MMORPG, he receives a request from a female character in the game. He thinks that he has lucked out and found a girlfriend online, but suddenly he finds himself transported into the world of Mira where he accidentally saves a young princess, Ecarlate, by landing on her attacker with his swivel chair. With no idea how he got there nor how to get back to his own world, Kon tags along with the princess as part of her honor guard while a militant faction of the princess's own country seeks to capture her before she can complete her arranged marriage.

== Characters ==
=== Kon's Party ===
Kon Hokaze (火風 紺, Hokaze Kon) DT
Voiced by: Takuya Eguchi
A hardcore video gamer who gets transported into the world of the game after accepting a request from a female character. He wields the "Alma Gear" sword, which is capable of transforming into a giant hammer with jet boosters. He also gets stuck with the nickname "DT" by accident (short for "dōtei" in Japanese, or slang for a male virgin). Because of his natural control of Alma energy, he is considered to be a Hyperion. He tries to avoid dangerous fights and uses cheap tactics when he feels like he cannot win; something that is the opposite of "ED."
Ecarlate Juptris Saint Piria (エカルラート・ジュピトリス・セントピリア, Ekarurāto Jupitorisu Sento Piria)
Voiced by: Shiori Mikami
The little princess of St. Piria with a nasty behavior who travels to marry the Prince of a neighboring country and bring peace to both sides. At certain periods of her growing stage, she appears to have a hyperactive appetite and ferocious behavior that is rarely seen.
Mariandale (マリアンデール, Mariandēru)
Voiced by: Jun Fukuyama
A transgender maid who wields pistols akimbo and protects the princess. She admits being jealous of the princess getting married. Occasionally, she will revert to her masculine voice. Later she has Almaflora give her Alma Gear to Erec.
Sainglain (セングレン, Senguren)
Voiced by: Kazuya Nakai
A well-sculpted veteran swordsman who also guards the princess. Graduated at the top of his class from a university, has experience in architecture design and engineering. He also greatly loves cats.
Pet (ペット, Petto)
Voiced by: Yoshimasa Hosoya
A flying squirrel sent by Almaflora that attached itself to Kon's party. Often seen wearing a tiny hat and goggles. Later on, it is revealed that he can talk and is elderly.

=== Incognito Faction ===
Erecpyle Dukakis (エレクパイル・デュカキス, Erekupairu Dukakisu)
Voiced by: Hiroshi Kamiya
The leader of a militant faction named "Incognito" that seeks to stop the Princess Ecarlate before she can be wed and bring peace to the land. Swears vengeance on "DT" after getting hit twice in the testicles so hard that a doctor is forced to remove them early on in the series (his name and character is a comedic reference to "ED", or "Erectile Dysfunction."); because he removed his testicles, this had helped him much later as it completely prevented Erecpyle from falling into the trap set by Limpus and Gabriella Dascas, who wanted to revive their family name. He was given Calibre after losing his Alma Gear. Despite being labeled as the antagonist in the series, he is rather honorable and fights clean, unlike his more opposite, "DT." At the end of the series he receives Mariandale's testicles.
Variation (バリアシオン, Bariashion)
Voiced by: Yuki Kaji
One of ED's lieutenants, accidentally defeated by Kon's swivel chair. He is the youngest of the group, despite being a major sadist; admitted himself when trying to go up against Kon's party solo. He's been intrigued with the idea of nudity, shown when he gladly joined Gustave 's plan to distract Kon by nudity and when he stripped into his underwear during Incognito's karaoke vacation. Variation is as well the most normal one in the group; he answered KT by sharing that he likes a kind girls. He shows distrust with his high rank superiors, the Ulga Sorority. He is very skilled in spying.
KT
Voiced by: Mitsuki Saiga
Another of ED's lieutenants. KT has a crush on ED and is a raging drunk. The "KT" could stand for "kintama," which is slang for "testicles." It is inferred in the anime that KT is male, when he asked ED if the latter liked guys over girls. In episode 23, it revealed that KT is a girl; though everyone except Erec knew that fact.
Gustave Gustaf (ギュスターヴ, Gyusutāvu)
Voiced by: Kenichi Suzumura
Another of ED's lieutenants. He is extremely sensitive when it comes to his divorce, though he likes lustful things. Gustave also has a thing for hostess bars and would always pick fights with KT for that reason.
Leon (レオン, Reon)
Voiced by: Tomokazu Sugita
Another of ED's lieutenants. He is a masochist, despite denying it.

=== Other ===
Almaflora (アルマフローラ, Arumafurōra)
Voiced by: Ryoko Shintani
A mysterious lady who is responsible for Kon being transported into the world of the game for reasons unknown. She is an Ixion. She is also responsible for forging the first Alma Gear Sword given to Erec (now in Kon's possession). She reforges Erec another Alma Gear called the Calibre (based on the Excalibur) and reminds him not to lose another Alma Gear again. She calls herself "mysterious women" and transported Kon so he can save the world. She later turned Kon's friends and Erec's men to Hyperions .
Emilia
Voiced by: Aya Endo
ED's fiancee. Her discussions with ED sometimes turn into uncomfortable situations due to ED losing his testicles in battle; something she is unaware of.
Miranda
Voiced by: Yu Kobayashi
A delusional woman who causes trouble for her entire village. Kon's party runs into her on the way to the capital, and she temporarily becomes infatuated with Kon.
Lord Nabokov Jugglaburk
Voiced by: Koji Yusa
Prince of Jugglaburk that is to be wed with Ecarlate for peace. However, he has an alternate agenda. He is actually a rather bizarre manchild with a fetish for dolls and stuffed animals, and had only agreed to marry Ecarlate because she was young and short enough that he could treat her as a living doll.

== Media ==
=== Anime ===
No.	Title	Original release date
1	"Dimension Transfer" (Japanese: DT(Dimension Transfer))	October 6, 2012
While struggling with a dragon in his MMORPG, Kon Hokaze thinks he's met the woman of his dreams online when a sexy female character comes to him with a request. Suddenly, he appears in a different world and accidentally saves a princess from attackers by landing on their lieutenant (Variation) with his swivel chair. Without knowing how he got into this world or how to return to his own, Kon decides to tag along with the little princess and her two bodyguards to find some answers. Meanwhile, the enemy leader (Erecpyle Dukakis) plans to avenge his lieutenant. He attacks the group, but Kon defeats Erecpyle by kicking him in the groin.
2	"Erecpyle Dukakis" (Japanese: ED(Erecpyle Dukakis))	October 13, 2012
Erecpyle awakens in a hospital to discover that one of his testicles was removed following Kon's cheap shot, and swears vengeance upon him. Back in town, Kon and Sainglain test out their newly acquired "Alma Gear" sword, but are unsure of how to unlock its power. Kon considers leaving the princess's entourage, but his resolve is tested again when Erecpyle reappears, piloting a Chariot (tank) and wrecking the town due to his imbalance caused by losing one of his testicles.
3	"Newcomer vs Kon" (Japanese: NK(Newcomer vs. Kon))	October 20, 2012
Similar to the beginning of the last episode, Erecpyle wakes up in a hospital to receive the news that his other testicle had to be removed following his battle with Kon, and he ends up taking an indefinite leave of absence from his post. Meanwhile, a small, blue-furred pet appears in the path of the princess and her entourage. Kon wants nothing to do with the creature and tries to scare it away, due an event in his past with another pet, but fails. The pet becomes part of the traveling group.
4	"Pretty Kama" (Japanese: PK(Pretty Kama))	October 27, 2012
After arguing over what to call the squirrel-thing that has attached itself to the party, Kon unilaterally names it "Pet." Meanwhile, Erecpyle goes back home with Variation to recover from his injury, when he finds his fiance Emilia waiting for him. Erecpyle can't bring himself to tell anyone the true nature of his injury. Things get even more complicated when Limpus and Gabriella Dascas hatch a plot to revive their family name by seducing Erecpyle, and then later drag him into a rigged duel when that plan fails.
5	"Beautiful Life" (Japanese: BL(Beautiful Life))	November 3, 2012
Kon and the group stop by a beach resort for some fun in the sun. Marian immediately grows popular among the locals, even after Kon exposes her transsexuality. Dumbfounded by this, Kon wonders why Marian is the person she is now, to which Sainglain and Ecarlate explain Marian's origin. Later, Kon tries to talk with a drunken Marian but ends up sleeping with her through the night. The next morning, Kon learns that the backstory Sainglain and Ecarlate told him about Marian was all a lie.
6	"Highness Guardians" (Japanese: HG(Highness Guardians))	November 10, 2012
A shadowy religious group decides to release a serial killer named Georg to deal with Ecarlate. Meanwhile, as the party stops to rest in another town, Mariandale and Sainglain are both shocked by the appearance of a cowlick (ahoge) sprouting on Ecarlate's head. They immediately rent out the entire inn and cater to her every whim, afraid of what will happen if they anger her during her "hyperactive period." Later that night, Georg sneaks into the inn to kill Ecarlate, but gets beaten by each bodyguard and then accidentally awakens Ecarlate's hyperactive form. Georg disappears after that night, but years later tells stories of a "three-haired monster" to scare some children.
7	"Keep On" (Japanese: KO(Keep On))	November 17, 2012
Ecarlate's party stops at the Tamatsukure Hot Springs and relishes the opportunity to relax in luxury. However, Kon finds that the spring is increasing his libido and soon finds his whole body glowing in a way that he can't turn off. To make matters worse, Erecpyle is visiting the same spring in an attempt to regain his own lost virility. The two end up running into each other in one of the hot springs and Kon once again defeats Erecpyle with a cheap shot, forcing the party to leave the area in the middle of the night. [Note: Tamatsukure can be read as a pun (roughly, "ball-making") or as an analog to the real Tamatsukuri Onsen in Japan and its supposed healing powers.]
8	"Shining Master" (Japanese: SM(Shining Master))	November 24, 2012
Unable to stop his glowing power, Kon attempts to cover it up. However, when the party reaches the next village, Kon's new secret is exposed. To his surprise, the village treats his glow as a sign that he is a god, and he plays along by acting as the god "Konpika," delivering them teachings from his knowledge of video games that his party helps to translate. Unfortunately, as Konpika gains a multitude of followers, they threaten to start a violent crusade against the Ulga Religious Sorority, forcing Kon to find a way to end his own legend as it spirals out of control
9	"Incognito Trial" (Japanese: IT(Incognito Trial))	December 1, 2012
Erecpyle tracks down a new Alma Gear weapon with the help of Almaflora. Meanwhile, the members of his "Incognito" unit begin to argue which one of them is Erec's true right-hand man as they await his return.
10	"Home Sick" (Japanese: HS(Home Sick))	December 8, 2012
Kon gets homesick, wishing for the comforts of his former life. When the party reaches a hotel, he crafts a wooden controller replica and pretends to play video games on a wall in his room, refusing to come out. Mariandale attempts to recreate a hamburger meal from "Snackdonalds," which Kon likes until he finds out what ingredients went into the food. Later, Marian brings him an erotic picture book, but that backfires as well. Then Sainglain enters him in an underground fight ring. Kon escapes the ring, later accusing his party of planning to kill him if he didn't snap out of his depression.
11	"Unexpected Victory" (Japanese: UV(Unexpected Victory))	December 15, 2012
After spending a night in an abandoned castle, Kon and the group are ambushed by Erecpyle and his Incognito unit. To make matters worse, Erec has equipped his lieutenants with special "DDOS" weapons that enhance their strength. After the two sides clash, the battle ends with Kon's party falling over a cliff, and each side gaining one hostage from the other party. While Mariandale stalls for time in Erec's camp, Kon manipulates Leon into giving up some secrets about his unit. He then initiates a hostage exchange, handing over Leon in exchange for Marian, but sets up an ambush for Erec's unit at the aforementioned castle. After luring the Incognito unit into several booby traps, Kon attempts to bluff Erec out of attacking him, but Erec calls his bluff and fires a large energy beam from his sword. In the end, Kon's headphones and Ecarlate's flower are all that remain of their respective owners.
12	"Behavioral Examination" (Japanese: BE(Behavioral Examination))	December 22, 2012
After the events of the last episode, Kon and Ecarlate are gone and Erec considers his mission successful, but Gustave is not fully convinced. While Gustave spies on Sainglain and Mariandale to see if they contact "DT" again, KT watches Gustave to make sure he isn't visiting nearby hostess clubs instead. After staking out their hotel for a while, Gustave finally track down the bodyguards meeting on the outskirts of town, only to find that they are at a funeral for Kon and Ecarlate. Gustave reports that "DT" is truly dead as Sainglain and Marian move on.
13	"Accidental Contact" (Japanese: AC(Accidental Contact))	January 6, 2013
Kon and Ecarlate turn out to be alive, as Kon reveals how he used a giant mirror found in the castle to fake their deaths. The group is relieved that Erec and his Incognito unit believe they are dead, and that they can safely get to the capital with no enemy following them. Meanwhile, an eccentric girl named Miranda begins to have incredible delusions about Kon after bumping into him, assaulting him several times for no apparent reason.
14	"Evidence Veiled" (Japanese: EV(Evidence Veiled))	January 12, 2013
With the journey almost over, Kon feels relieved that he may finally find a way to get back home. However, while looking for a spot to relieve himself, he spots Pet talking to someone over a magic radio. After abusing him a bit, Pet tells Kon that he is imbued with Alma magic and that he was sent to watch him. Kon then tries to convince his allies that Pet can talk, but after they don't believe him, he threatens to castrate Pet. Ecarlate notices Pet talking after that, but Kon tries to neuter Pet anyway.
15	"Midnight Trial" (Japanese: MT (Midnight Trial))	January 19, 2013
The group finally makes it to the capital of St. Piria. Kon is glad as he believes he'll finally be able to go home. As Ecarlate prepares for her wedding, Kon is instructed to meet with the astrologer in a tower west of the capital. However, he gets lost and ends up running across several different anti-Empire factions, each represented by a weird costumed character. While the representatives fight each other, Kon and Pet end up stumbling into the astrologer's tower, where a female voice tells Kon to go to Jugglaburk's domain for his next clue to get home.
16	"Hit Back" (Japanese: HB(Hit Back))	January 26, 2013
Word reaches Incognito that the princess is alive and headed to Jugglaburk's domain from the capital. While they are on standby, Variation decides to infiltrate Jugglaburk's airship by himself. Meanwhile, Kon and the others have mixed feelings about the princess's betrothal.
17	"Bridal Service" (Japanese: BS (Bridal Service))	February 2, 2013
The group finally makes it to Jugglaburk's capital. Upon arrival, Kon hears from Pet about an Ixion Experimental Lab and goes to check it out to see if there's any leads about Olvidia. After being experimented on by an effeminate doctor and his sexy assistants, Kon runs back to the party, only for them to include him in their pre-wedding rituals.
18	"Formality and Obstruction" (Japanese: FO(Formality and Obstruction))	February 9, 2013
Kon goes through the 18 trials for the princess's upcoming wedding while Erec and Incognito come up with crazy schemes to sabotage his efforts, which only backfire.
19	"Off Key" (Japanese: OK(Off Key))	February 16, 2013
When the stress of the wedding rituals causes Ecarlate to sprout a cowlick again, the party is forced to endure the "Karaoke from Hell" in order to calm her down. Meanwhile, Incognito happens to be partying in the next room, and each time Erecpyle tries to sing a song someone else cuts in front of him.
20	"Xing Point" (Japanese: XP(Xing Point))	February 23, 2013
Ecarlate's wedding finally commences, however Kon starts to feel upset with the wedding.
21	"Metamorphose at Gate" (Japanese: MG(Metamorphose at Gate))	March 2, 2013
With Kon's group and Incognito now enemies of Jugglaburk, Alma Flora steps in and transports them to a Ixion ruin. She then explain the truth of events, what the Ulga Sorority is planning and the reason why she transported Kon to this world. Then she turns both sides into Hyperions and lets them select Alma Gear weapons from a giant vending machine before sending them back to their original positions.
22	"Before Crisis" (Japanese: BC(Before Crisis))	March 9, 2013
After Variation manages to escape from his predicament, he launches into a brief history of the beginning of Incognito that seems to be more like a movie where Incognito acts as a police vice squad. Not even Variation's driver knows what to make of it as the episode ends.
23	"No Margin" (Japanese: NM(No Margin))	March 16, 2013
Kon believes he sees an omen in the stars that he is about to die while the Ulga Sorority plays the Empire and anti-Empire forces against each other. Meanwhile, Variation barely escapes the Ulbrion troops and KT reveals to her Incognito teammates that she is actually a woman, but only Erecpyle is surprised.
24	"Knighthood" (Japanese: K1(Knighthood))	March 23, 2013
Kon and the group races to stop the war between the two nations that was orchestrated by the Ulga Sorority. In response, the Sorority unleashes their Ulbrions on Kon's party. Fortunately for them, Incognito shows up in time to defeat the Ulbrions and allow them to push through. The two sides strike a truce with each other as they manage to stop the war with Alma Flora's help, but then the Ulga Sorority reveals its last trump card.
25	"Kon of Knack" (Japanese: K2 (Kon of Knack))	March 30, 2013
Archbishop Taulepton and Ulga Sorority unleash their final weapon: the ultra giant Forezo. Kon must defeat it, as even his fellow Hyperions are unable to dent it. He ends up convincing it to be peaceful, as it was really just misguided. A final battle begins between Incognito and Kon's party, but Marian agrees to transfer her balls to E.D. Kon says goodbye to his friends and Erec's group, and is returned to his room, almost convinced that the world was a dream. However, he still feels the last slap from Ecarlate. The episode ends with a joke about a second season 10 years in the future, with a grown up Princess Ecarlate, but no second season is confirmed.
