= Yamashiro Futagozuka Kofun =

Kofun period burial mound in Matsue, Japan

Yamashiro Futagozuka
- 山代二子塚 (Japanese)
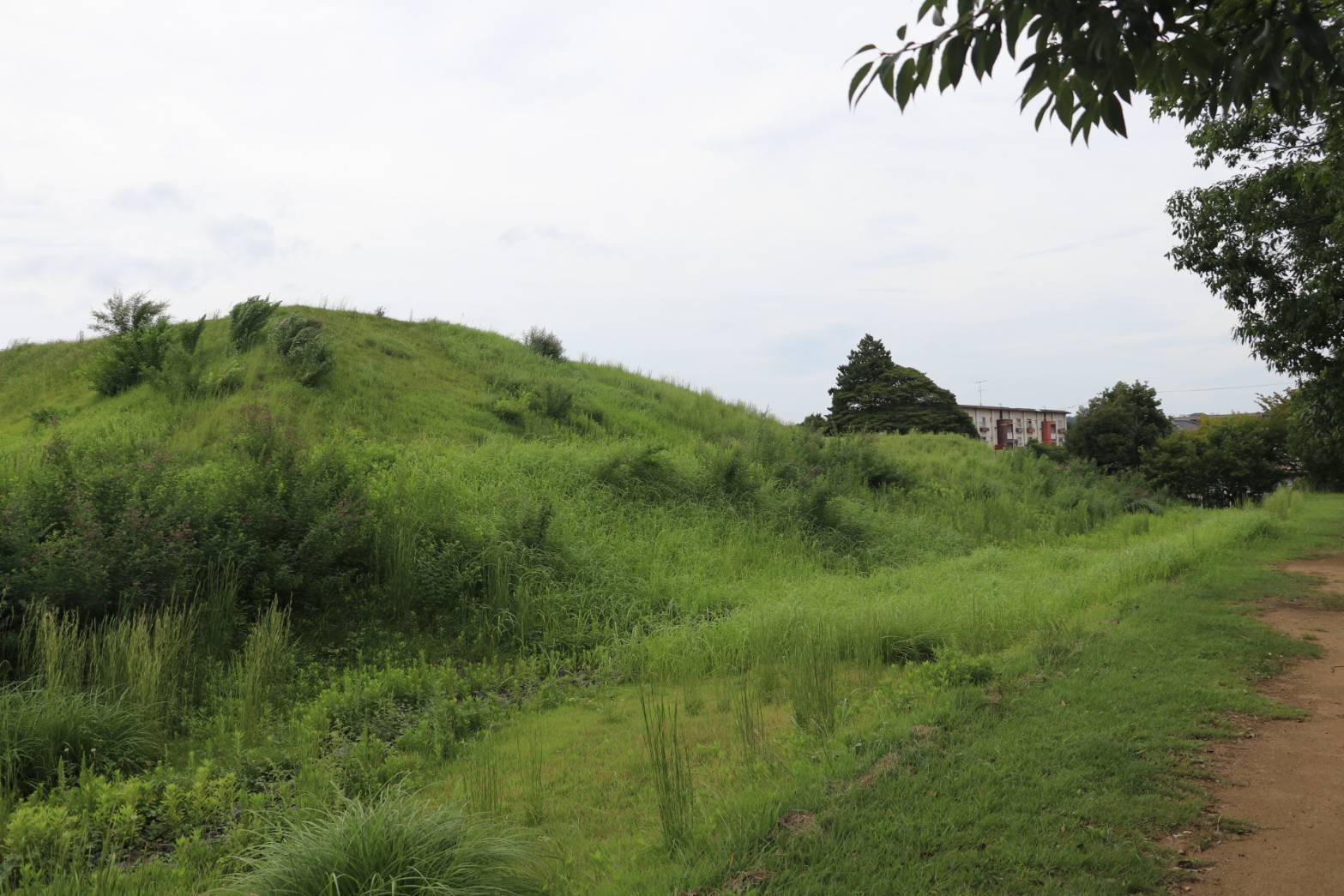
- Yamashiro Futagozuka

- Yamashiro Futagozuka Yamashiro Futagozuka Kofun (Japan)
- Interactive map of Yamashiro Futagozuka
- 35°26′20.8″N 133°05′14.4″E
- Type: Kofun
- Periods: Kofun period
- Location: Matsue, Shimane, Japan
- Region: San'in region

History
- Built: c.6th century

Site notes
- Public access: Yes (no facilities)

Yamashiro Futagozuka (山代二子塚) is a Kofun period burial mound, located in the Yamashiro-chō neighborhood of the city of Matsue, Shimane in the San'in region of Japan. The tumulus was designated a National Historic Site of Japan in 1924.

== Overview ==
The Yamashiro Futagozuka is located on a low plateau at the northwestern foot of Mount Chausu, and is a "two conjoined rectangles" (zenpō-kōhō-fun (前方後方墳))-style burial mound. Although half of the posterior portion of tumulus was destroyed to collect soil, it is believed to be the largest such tumulus in Shimane Prefecture, with a total length of about 90 meters, and over 120 meters including the surrounding moat. The tumulus was built in two stages, and shards of both cylindrical and figurative haniwa have been found in the step between the upper and lower tiers. Other artifacts found include Sue ware pottery. Only the upper tier of the tumulus is covered in fukiishi. The internal structure is unknown because it has not been excavated; however, from the style and haniwa, it is believed to have been built in the first half of the 6th century, or towards the end of the Kofun period. Together with the Ōbaniwatorizuka Kofun and Yamashiro hōfun, it forms the Yamashiro/Ōba Tumulus Group.

The tumulus about 4.3 kilometers (12 minutes by car) southeast from Matsue Station on the JR West San'in Main Line. There is an on-site museum.

== See also ==
- List of Historic Sites of Japan (Shimane)
