= University of Shimane Junior College =

Coordinates: 35°26′19.7″N 133°3′38.7″E

- 島根県立大学短期大学部
- Type: Public
- Established: 1953
- Location: Matsue, Shimane, Japan
- Website: izumo.u-shimane.ac.jp/ja/matsue/

The University of Shimane Junior College (島根県立大学短期大学部, Shimane Kenritsu Daigaku Tanki Daigakubu) is a public junior college in Matsue, Shimane, Japan.

== History ==
It was established in 1953 as a junior college for women. In 2007, the junior college became coeducational.

== See also ==
- List of junior colleges in Japan
- University of Shimane
