= Matsue Vogel Park Station =

Railway station in Matsue, Shimane Prefecture, Japan

Matsue Vogel Park Station 松江フォーゲルパーク駅
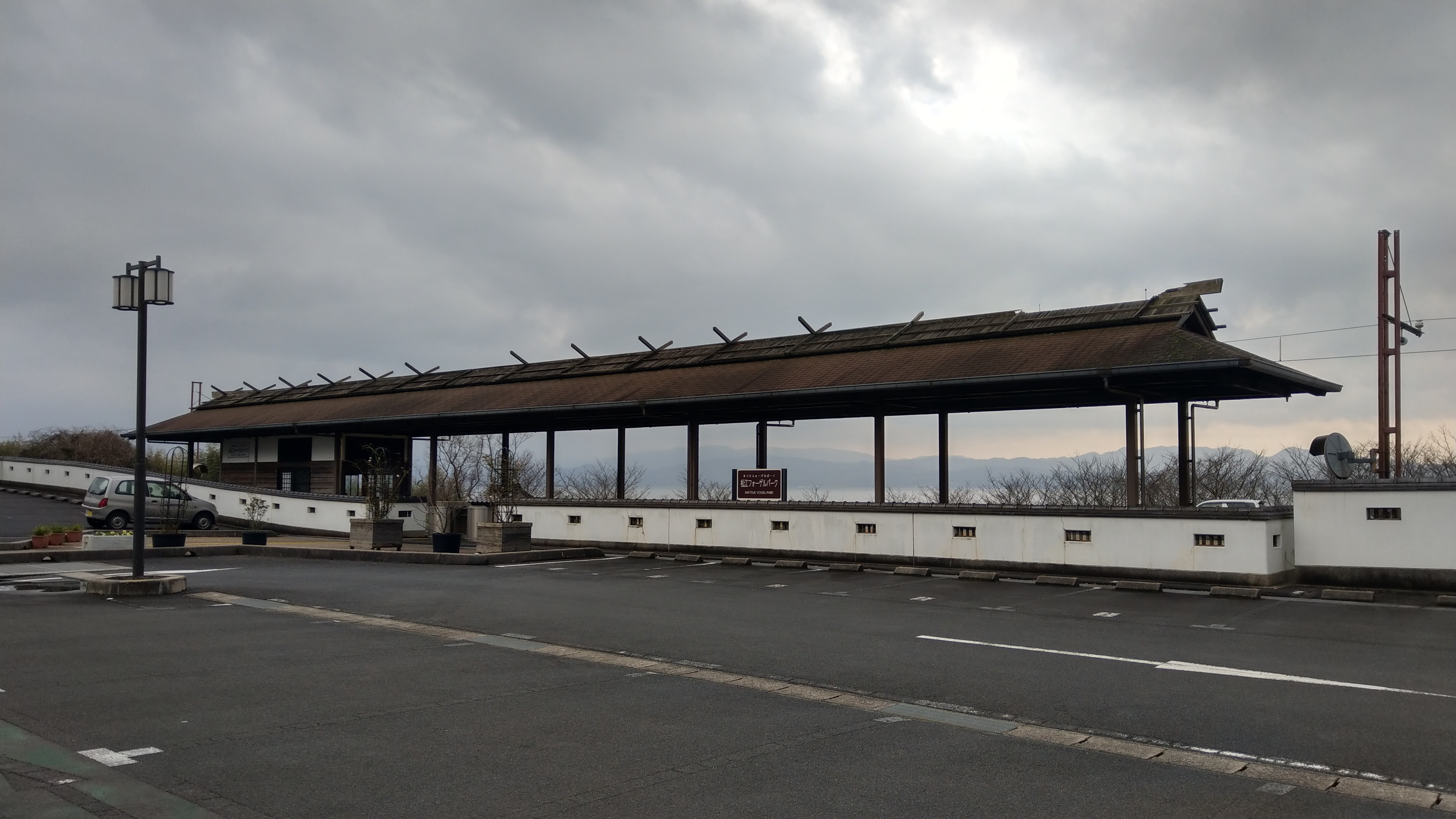
- Matsue Vogel Park Station, January 2020

General information
- Location: Ogaki-cho, Matsue-shi, Shimane-ken 690-0263; Japan
- Coordinates: 35°28′29.89″N 132°56′37.38″E
- Operator: Ichibata Electric Railway
- Line: ■ Kita-Matsue Line
- Distance: 23.8 km (14.8 miles) from Dentetsu-Izumoshi
- Platforms: 1 side platform
- Tracks: 1

Construction
- Structure type: at grade

Other information
- Status: Unstaffed
- Station code: 17
- Website: Official website

History
- Opened: 23 July 2001

Passengers
- FY 2019: 63 daily
Location
- Location within Shimane Prefecture Location within Japan

Matsue Vogel Park Station (松江フォーゲルパーク駅, Matsue-Fōgeru-Pāku-eki) is a passenger railway station located in the city of Matsue, Shimane Prefecture, Japan. It is operated by the private transportation company, Ichibata Electric Railway. This station serves Matsue Vogel Park, an aviary park and greenhouse.

== Lines ==
Matsue Vogel Park Station is served by the Kita-Matsue Line, and is located 23.8 kilometers from the terminus of the line at Dentetsu-Izumoshi. Local services and the express service Izumotaisha stop at this station.

== Station layout ==
The station consists of one side platform serving a single bi-directional track. The platform has a long roof styled after the roof of a Shinto shrine. The station is unattended.

== Adjacent stations ==
«	Service	»
Ichibata Electric Railway
Kita-Matsue Line
Limited Express Superliner: Does not stop at this station
Express: Does not stop at this station
Tsunomori	Express Izumotaisha	Aikamachi
Takanomiya	Local	Aikamachi

== History ==
Matsue Vogel Park Station was opened on 23 July 2001.

== Passenger statistics ==
In fiscal 2019, the station was used by an average of 63 passengers daily.

== Surrounding area ==
- Matsue Vogel Park
- Japan National Route 431
- Lake Shinji

== See also ==
- List of railway stations in Japan
