= Masataka Matsuura =

Japanese politician

- 松浦 正敬
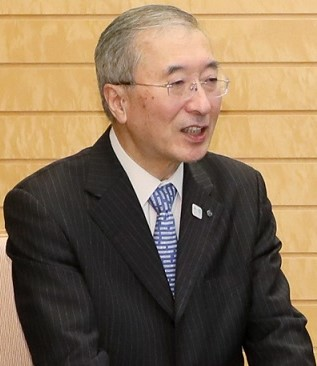

Mayor of Matsue
- In office June 2000 – April 2021
- Preceded by: Toshio Miyaoka
- Succeeded by: Uesada Akihito

Personal details
- Born: 18 March 1948 (age 78) Matsue, Shimane, Japan
- Party: Independent
- Education: University of Tokyo
- Website: www.matsuura-m.jp

Masataka Matsuura (松浦 正敬, Matsuura Masataka) is a Japanese politician who served as mayor of Matsue, the capital city of Shimane Prefecture, Japan from 2000 to 2021.
