= Ama no Fuchigoma =

Mythical horse from Japanese folklore

Ama no Fuchigoma (天乃斑駒; lit. "heavenly spotted horse") is a mythical horse from a collection of Japanese folklore known as the Chronicles of Japan or Nihon-Shoki (日本書紀). In the myth, Ama no Fuchigoma was ridden by the god Susanoo.
