= Takanomiya Station =

Railway station in Matsue, Shimane Prefecture, Japan

Takanomiya Station 高ノ宮駅
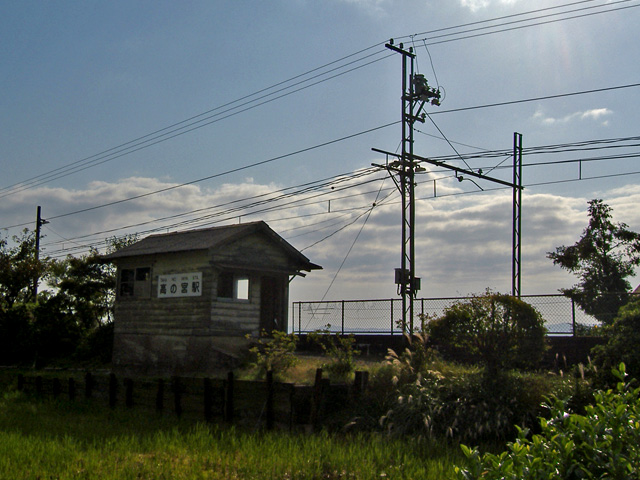
- Takanomiya Station, October 2007

General information
- Location: 1145-3 Ogaki-cho, Matsue-shi, Shimane-ken 690-0263; Japan
- Coordinates: 35°28′18.87″N 132°55′49.7″E
- Operator: Ichibata Electric Railway
- Line: ■ Kita-Matsue Line
- Distance: 22.5 km (14.0 miles) from Dentetsu-Izumoshi
- Platforms: 1 side platform
- Tracks: 1

Construction
- Structure type: at grade

Other information
- Status: Unstaffed
- Station code: 16
- Website: Official website

History
- Opened: 5 April 1928

Passengers
- FY 2019: 24 daily
Location
- Location within Shimane Prefecture Location within Japan

Takanomiya Station (高ノ宮駅, Takanomiya-eki) is a passenger railway station located in the city of Matsue, Shimane Prefecture, Japan. It is operated by the private transportation company, Ichibata Electric Railway.

== Lines ==
Takanomiya Station is served by the Kita-Matsue Line, and is located 22.5 kilometers from the terminus of the line at Dentetsu-Izumoshi. Only local services stop at this station.

== Station layout ==
The station consists of one side platform serving a single bi-directional track. The station is unattended.

== Adjacent stations ==
«	Service	»
Ichibata Electric Railway
Kita-Matsue Line
Limited Express Superliner: Does not stop at this station
Express Izumotaisha: Does not stop at this station
Express: Does not stop at this station
Tsunomori	Local	Matsue Vogel Park

== History ==
Takanomiya Station was opened on 5 April 1928.

== Passenger statistics ==
In fiscal 2019, the station was used by an average of 24 passengers daily.

== Surrounding area ==
- Japan National Route 431
- Lake Shinji

== See also ==
- List of railway stations in Japan
