= Kumano Taisha =

Shinto shrine

- 熊野大社
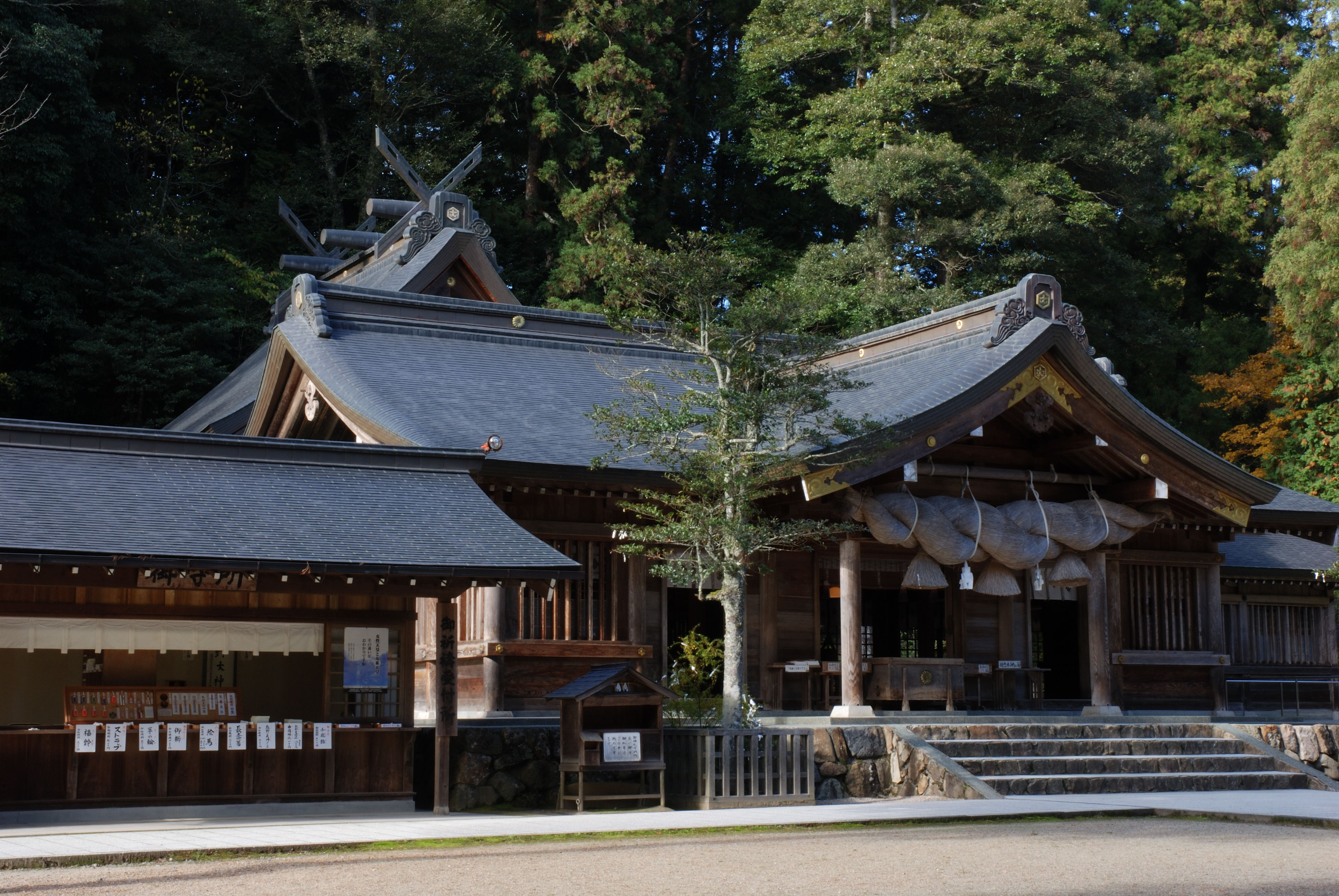

- Location within Japan Location within Shimane Prefecture

Religion
- Affiliation: Shinto
- Deity: Susanoo-no-Mikoto
- Festival: Sankasai Fire Festival
- Type: Kokuhei Taisha

Location
- Location: Matsue, Shimane Prefecture, Japan
- Interactive map of Kumano Taisha
- Coordinates: 35°37′33.2″N 133°07′03.2″E

Architecture
- Style: Shinto shrine style
- Founder: Empress Saimei (some source says)
- Established: 7th century

Kumano Taisha (熊野大社, Kumano-taisha) is a Shinto shrine located in Matsue, Shimane Prefecture. The shrine is dedicated to the god Kaburogi-kumano-okami Kushi-mike-no-mikoto (伊邪那伎日真名子加夫呂伎熊野大神櫛御気野命, "Beloved Child of Izanagi, Divine Ancestor [and] Great Deity of Kumano, Kushimikenu-no-Mikoto'), which is identified with Susanoo-no-Mikoto.

The Kumano Taisha is considered one of the most sacred ichinomiyas in the Izumo Province, along with the Izumo Grand Shrine. It is not to be confused with the Kumano Sanzan shrine complex in Wakayama Prefecture. It is significant in Japanese culture as the origin of fire in Japan. The shrine is also considered in myth to be where the use of fire originated; two ancient fire-making tools, a hand drill (燧杵 hikiri-kine) and a hearthboard (燧臼 hikiri-usu) are kept in the shrine and used in the shrine's Sankasai Fire Festival (鑚火祭 Kiribi-matsuri or Sanka-sai) held every October.

== Location ==
The shrine is situated in a mountainous region about 15 km to the south of Matsue's central district and is accessible by car in approximately 30 minutes. The Yakumo-bashi Bridge, painted in vivid vermillion color, stretches across of Iu River. Before ascending the stone steps to the shrine, visitors can purify their body and mind at the water basin.

== Halls ==
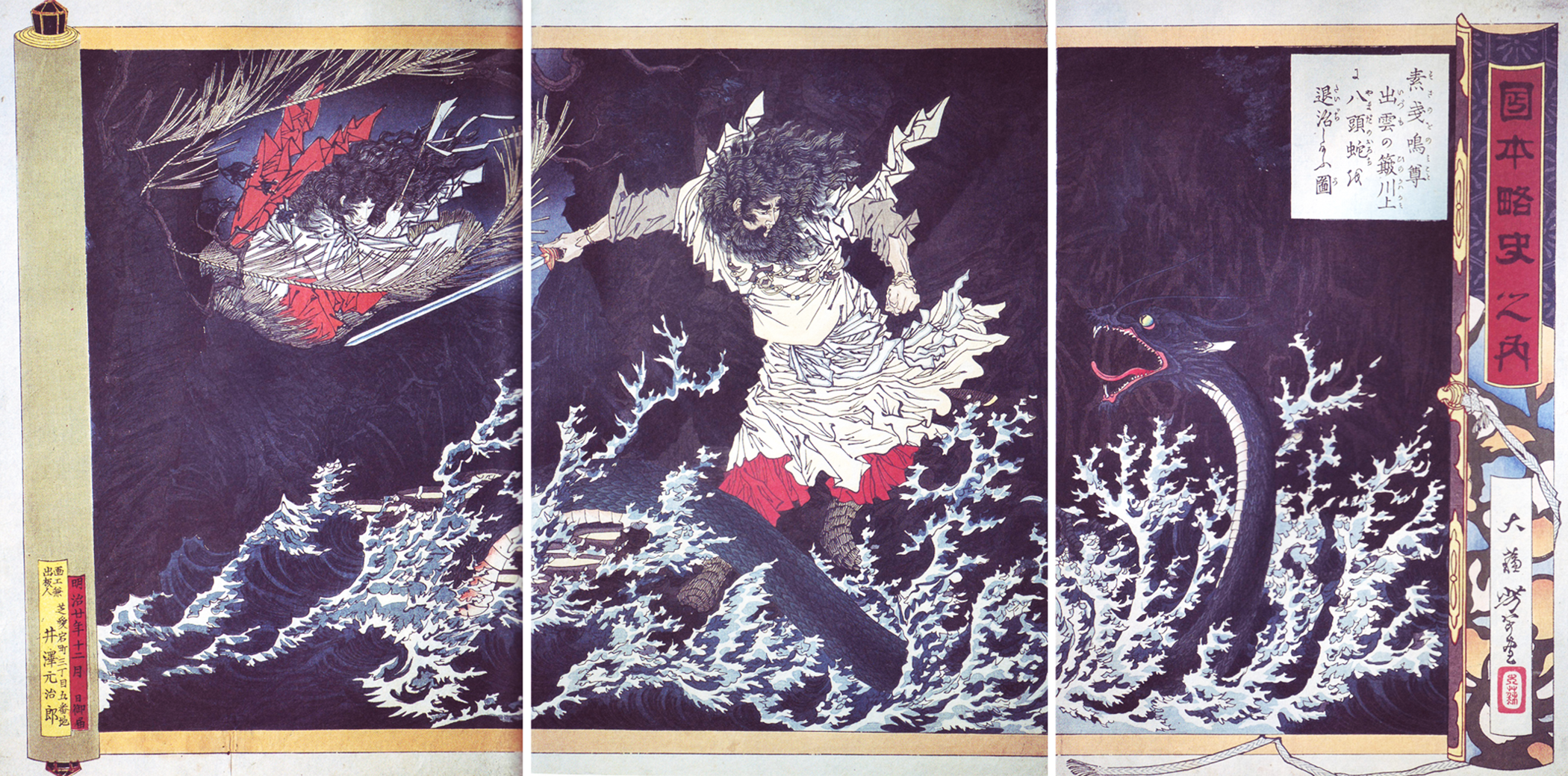
Susanoo and the Yamata no Orochi, by Yoshitoshi

In the center of the grounds lies the main hall, where the deity Susanoo-no-Mikoto is enshrined. On the right-hand side stands the Inada Shrine, which is dedicated to Princess Inadahime, whom Susano-o-no-Mikoto saved from the 8-headed serpent Yamata no Orochi and married, according to Japanese mythology. On the left is Izanami Shrine dedicated to the creation goddess Izanami, who was the mother of Susano.

In addition to the main hall, there are several other structures located in the grounds of Kumano Taisha. These include the Kou Shrine and Inari Shrine, as well as the Zuijin-mon Gate, Sanka-den Hall, the Mai-den spiritual dance hall, and a resting place called Kansui-tei. The comb guard at Kumano Taisha is well-known as a talisman for marriage. A comb-shaped amulet is given as a symbol of Kushinaida Hiyori and Motoen Kodori's successful union. It is believed to increase one's love fortune and bring about marital satisfaction.

== History ==
The Kumano Taisha has a long history dating back to ancient times. The shrine was first recorded in the Chapter 26: Empress Saimei chronicle (659 AD) in the Nihon Shoki (The Chronicles of Japan). According to the ancient chronicles, Izumo no kuni fudoki (733 AD), the shrine was originally located on Mount Kumano (present-day Mount Tengu). The shrine was mentioned as Kumano Nimasu Shrine in the Engishiki Jinmyo-cho Notebook (927 AD) and was also referred to as Hinomoto-hidezome Shrine. Kumano Taisha Shrine has been considered a grand shrine of the Land of Izumo since ancient times, and it has been revered along with Izumo Taisha Shrine. The imperial court of Japan also deeply revered the shrine, and it rose in rank from 3rd in 851 AD to 2nd in 867 AD respectively.

The Kumano Taisha was relocated from Mount Kumano to the foot of the mountain. Subsequently, the shrine was split into an upper and a lower section. Until the end of the Edo period, the upper shrine was called Kumano Sansha Gongen, while the lower shrine was known as Isemiya. In 1871, the shrine was designated as a middle-ranked shrine and was later elevated to the status of a top-ranked Grand National Shrine in 1916. However, during the Meiji period's shrine system reform, its title was downgraded from Taisha (the grand shrine) to Jinja (a regular shrine). It wasn't until 1978 that it was finally reinstated to the rank of Taisha. The same year saw the rebuilding of the shrine during the sengu ceremony, which also involved a reform of the buildings within the shrine grounds. Additionally, the Sukei-kai, an organization of local parishioners and believers from all over the country, was established. Kumano Taisha Shrine shares a strong connection with Izumo Taisha Shrine and the festival of Izumo Taisha begins with receiving the sacred fire, which is the essence of Kumano Taisha's deity, along with the fire-kindling tools from Kumano Taisha. These tools are also utilized in the inauguration ceremony at Izumo Taisha and are presented annually at Kumano Taisha's Sankasai Fire Festival.

== Gallery ==
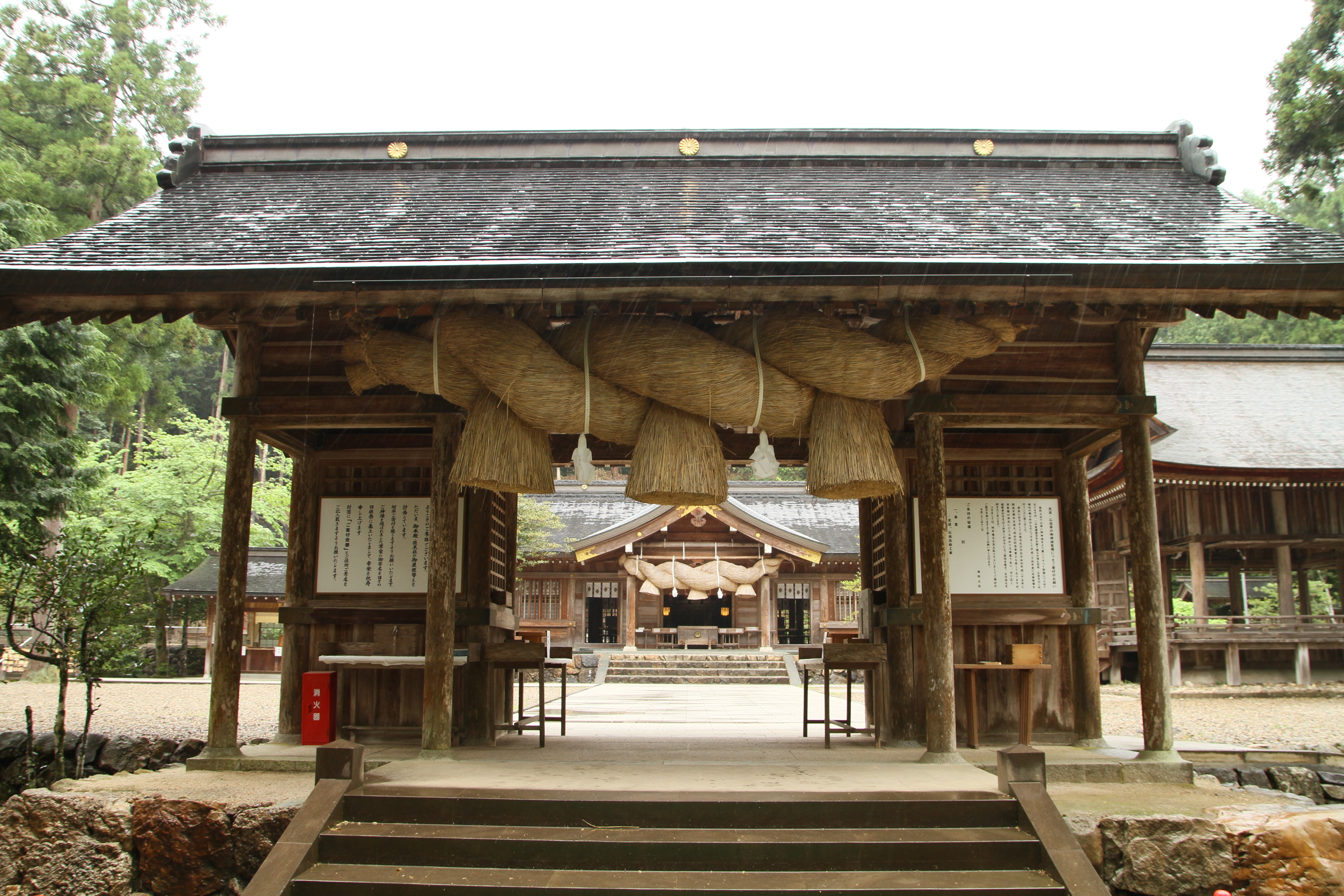
Zuishinmon Gate

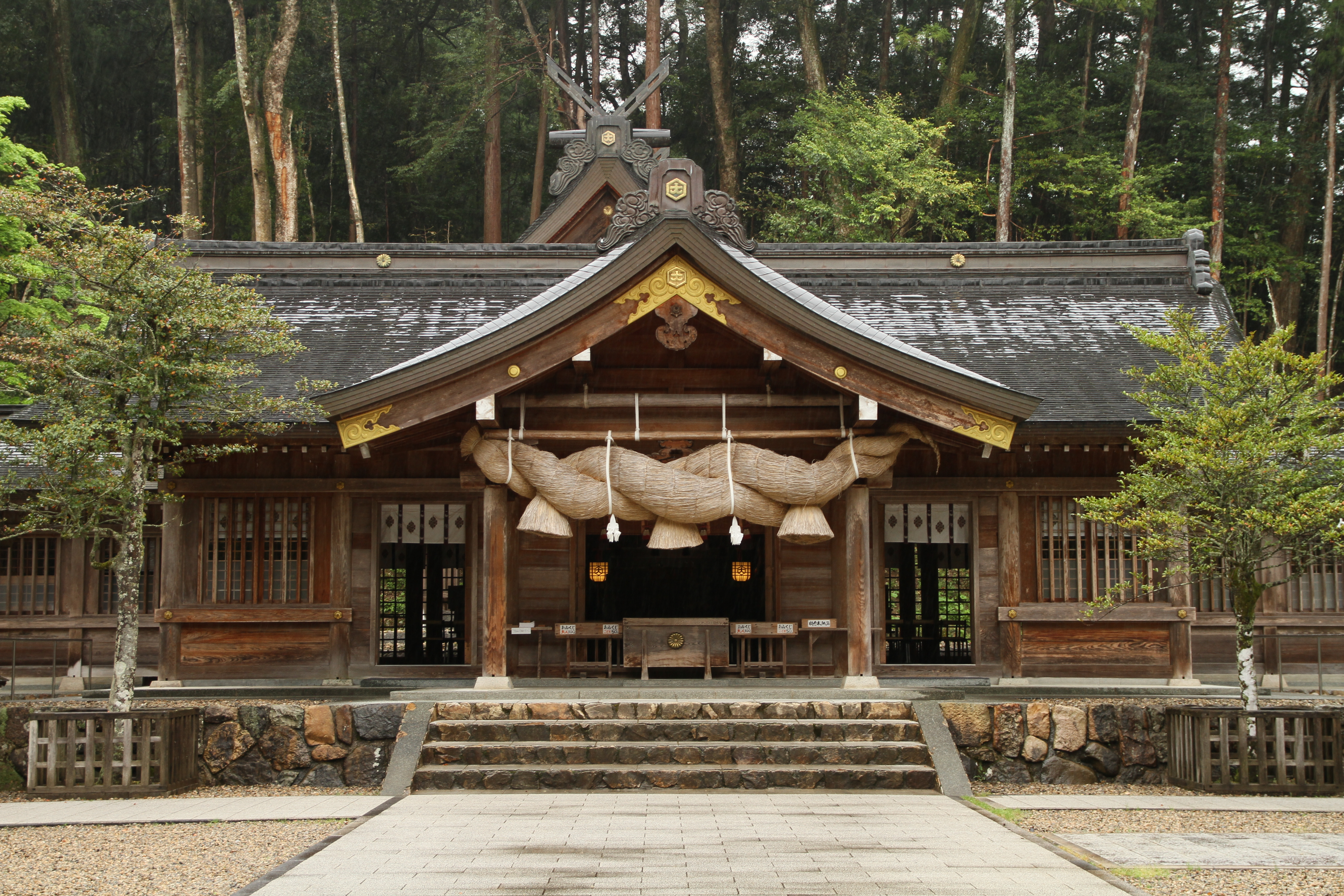
The worship hall

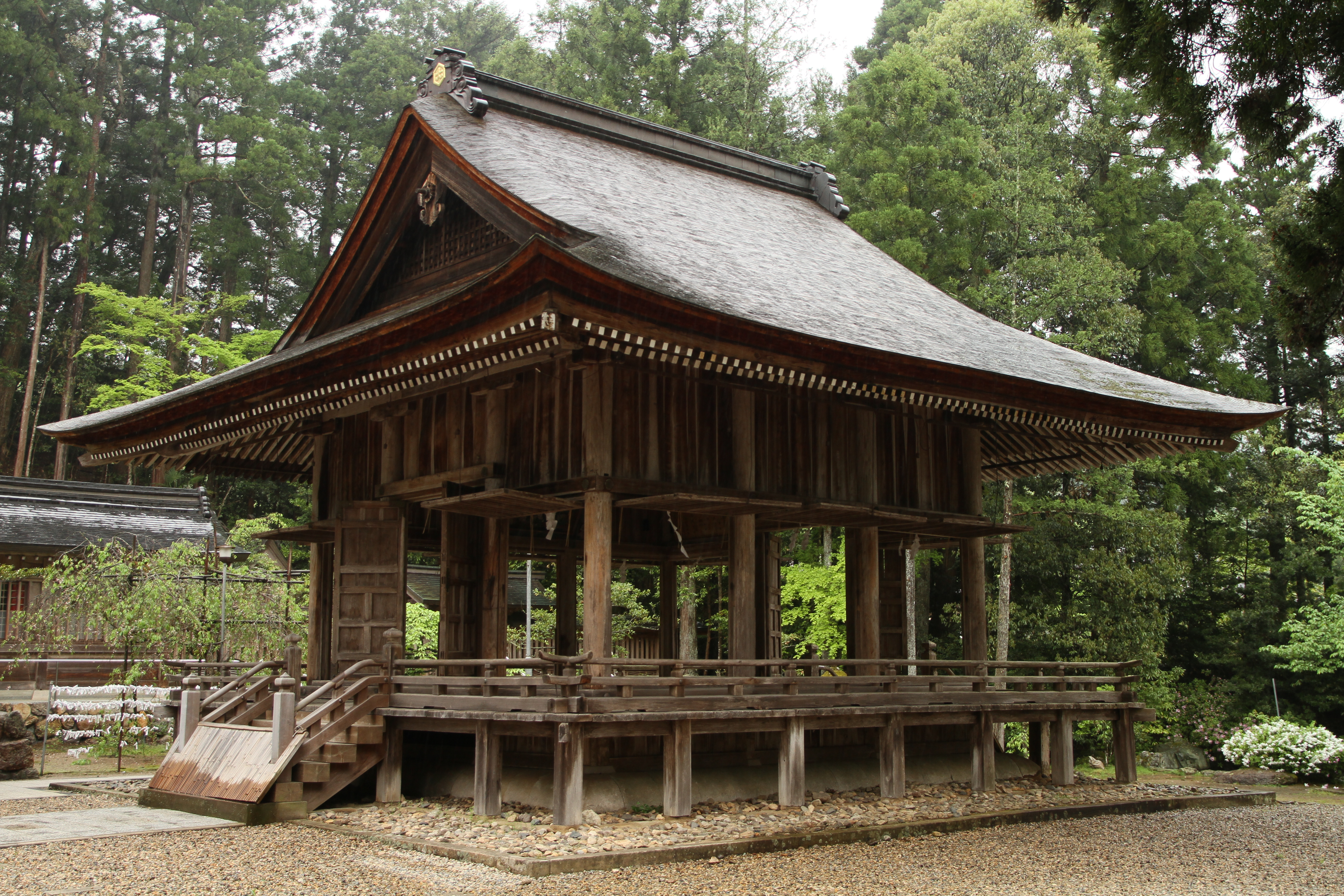
The dance hall

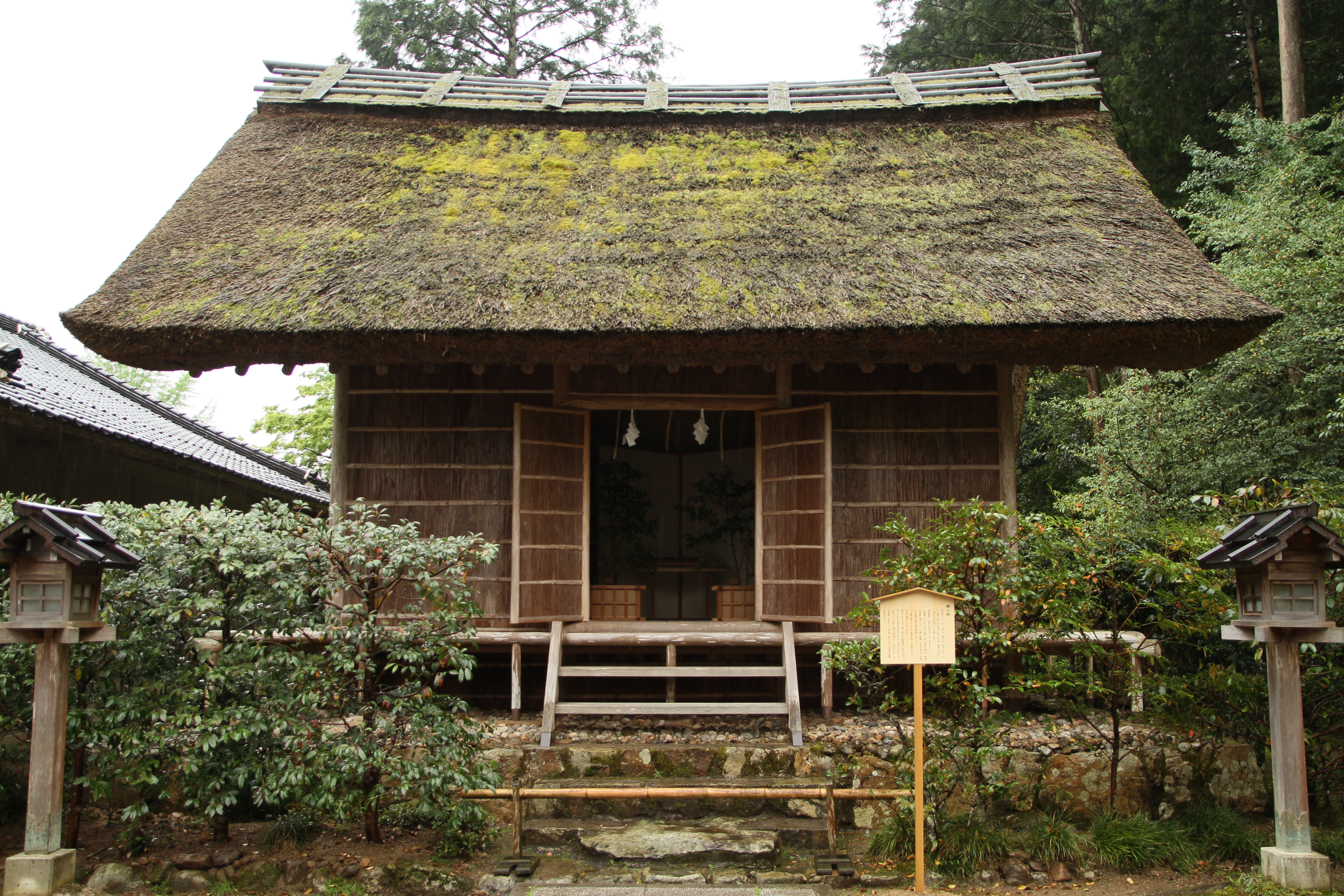
The fire hall
