= Yamashiro hōfun =

Yamashiro Hōfun
- 山代方墳 (Japanese)
- Yamashiro Hōfun Yamashiro hōfun (Japan)
- Interactive map of Yamashiro Hōfun
- 35°26′21″N 133°05′21″E
- Type: Kofun
- Periods: Kofun period
- Location: Matsue, Shimane, Japan
- Region: San'in region

History
- Built: c.6th century

Site notes
- Public access: Yes (no facilities)

The Yamashiro Hōfun (山代方墳) is a Kofun period burial mound, located in the Yamashiro-cho neighborhood of the city of Matsue, Shimane in the San'in region of Japan. The tumulus was designated a National Historic Site of Japan in 1941. It is one of the largest burial mounds in Shimane Prefecture, and one of the last major burial mounds to have been constructed in the Izumo region.

== Overview ==
Yamashiro Hōfun is a large square hōfun (方墳)-style burial mound built in the late Kofun period to the east of Yamashiro Futagozuka Kofun. The two-tiered burial mound is about 43 meters by 45 meters and 7 meters high. There are traces of a moat about six meters wide surrounding it; therefore when taking the width of moats into consideration, the tumulus occupies a 70 x 70 meter area. Inside, there is a tunnel-style stone burial chamber. The ceiling and walls are each made of one monolithic block of cut stone, and the floor is also laid with cut stone. No grave goods remain as the burial chamber has been open since antiquity. The tumulus is thought to date from the end of the late Kofun period (late 6th century to early 7th century) due to its construction.

In 1992, part of the ditch was excavated and surveyed, and many earthenware vessels used for funerals unique to Izumo, called "Izumo-type child-bearing jars", were unearthed.

== See also ==
- List of Historic Sites of Japan (Shimane)
