= Mari Funaki =

Australian sculptor (1950–2010)

- Born: 1950; Matsue, Shimane, Japan
- Died: 13 May 2010 (aged 59–60)
- Occupations: Jeweller designer and sculptor

Mari Funaki (1950 – 13 May 2010) was an Australian contemporary jeweller, designer, metal-smith and sculptor. She was active from 1990 to 2010. Initially a jeweller, she moved towards "purely sculptural forms" from the late 1990s.

== Early life and education ==
Funaki was born in Matsue, Shimane, Japan. She moved to Australia in 1979 and studied painting and gold and silversmithing at the Royal Melbourne Institute of Technology (RMIT).

== Career ==
In 1995, Funaki exhibited containers, containers for candles and gold jewellery in her exhibition Marie Funaki Metalwork in at the Crafts Council for the ACT. Work from this exhibition caught the attention of and was acquired by Jim Logan, the new assistant curator of Australian decorative arts at the National Gallery of Australia.

Funaki was known for her distinctive arthropod-like brooches, rings and bracelets, which later merged into her large scale geometric sculptural works, some up to 6 metres tall. She started Gallery Funaki, Melbourne in 1995. The gallery, now run by previous gallery director Katie Scott, is regarded as one of the "key world jewellery spaces" showcasing the work of leading Australian and international jewellers.

In 2009, the Art Gallery of Western Australia held a solo exhibition Marie Funaki Works 1992–2009. Funaki produced a number of new works for this exhibition. The catalogue description of the exhibition explained:

"There is always a sense of danger in her work, as the spindly legs of her insect-like containers support unlikely, unwieldy torsos, and as her rings and bracelets cultivate miniature monoliths that play with scale and weight in fascinating ways".

In 2010, the National Gallery of Australia commissioned Funaki to create a sculpture for the entrance to the new Stage 1 building which included the Australian indigenous art galleries and the southern entrance. The sculpture Twilight was created in aluminium and finished with black polymer paint. Inspired by the pukumani burial poles of the Tiwi Islands, Funaki said of this work:

"I like to make my forms stir people’s emotions or imagination. As an object maker I have always been interested in the interplay and dialogue between negative and positive, between volume and space, between inside and outside."

During the final stages of creating this sculpture with fabricator Robert Hook, Funaki became unwell and died in May 2010 after a long battle with cancer.

A survey exhibition of her work was held at the National Gallery of Victoria in late 2010 Marie Funaki: Objects. The exhibition followed her work from the late 1990s to 2010, mapping her development from gold and mild steel wearable objects to pure sculpture. The exhibition highlighted Funaki's "brilliant inventiveness with line, mass, volume and space across various sculptural forms." Her geometric sculptures were described as "gravity defying"

Funaki’s jewellery, objects and sculptures are held in private and public collections including the National Gallery of Australia, the Powerhouse Museum, the National Gallery of Victoria and Die Neue Sammlung in Munich.

== Funaki Gallery (1995-present) ==
Funaki Gallery was founded in 1995 by Mari Funaki, since Funaki's death in 2010, the gallery has continued under the directorship of Katie Scott. The Gallery was designed by Melbourne company Workshop Architects and is located in Flinders Lane, Melbourne and hosts contemporary jewellery artists both Australian and international makers.

== Exhibitions ==
- Asialink Asia Gold exhibition, 1993, Royal Melbourne Institute of Technology.
- Mari Funaki - A Selection of Containers, Containers for light and gold jewellery, 5-18 June 1995, Craft Council of the ACT Gallery, Canberra.
- Mari Funaki: Objects, 6 August to 24 October 2010, The Ian Potter Centre: NGV Australia, Federation Square.

== Awards ==
1996: Herbert-Hofmann-Preis

1999: Herbert-Hofmann-Preis

== Legacy ==
In 2014 the Mari Funaki Award for Contemporary Jewellery was founded.

The RMIT holds a collection of over 200 books and art catalogues

A street is named after her in the Canberra suburb of Whitlam.
