= Tamatsukuri Onsen =

Hot spring in Shimane Prefecture, Japan

Coordinates: 35°24′58.6″N 133°0′37.6″E

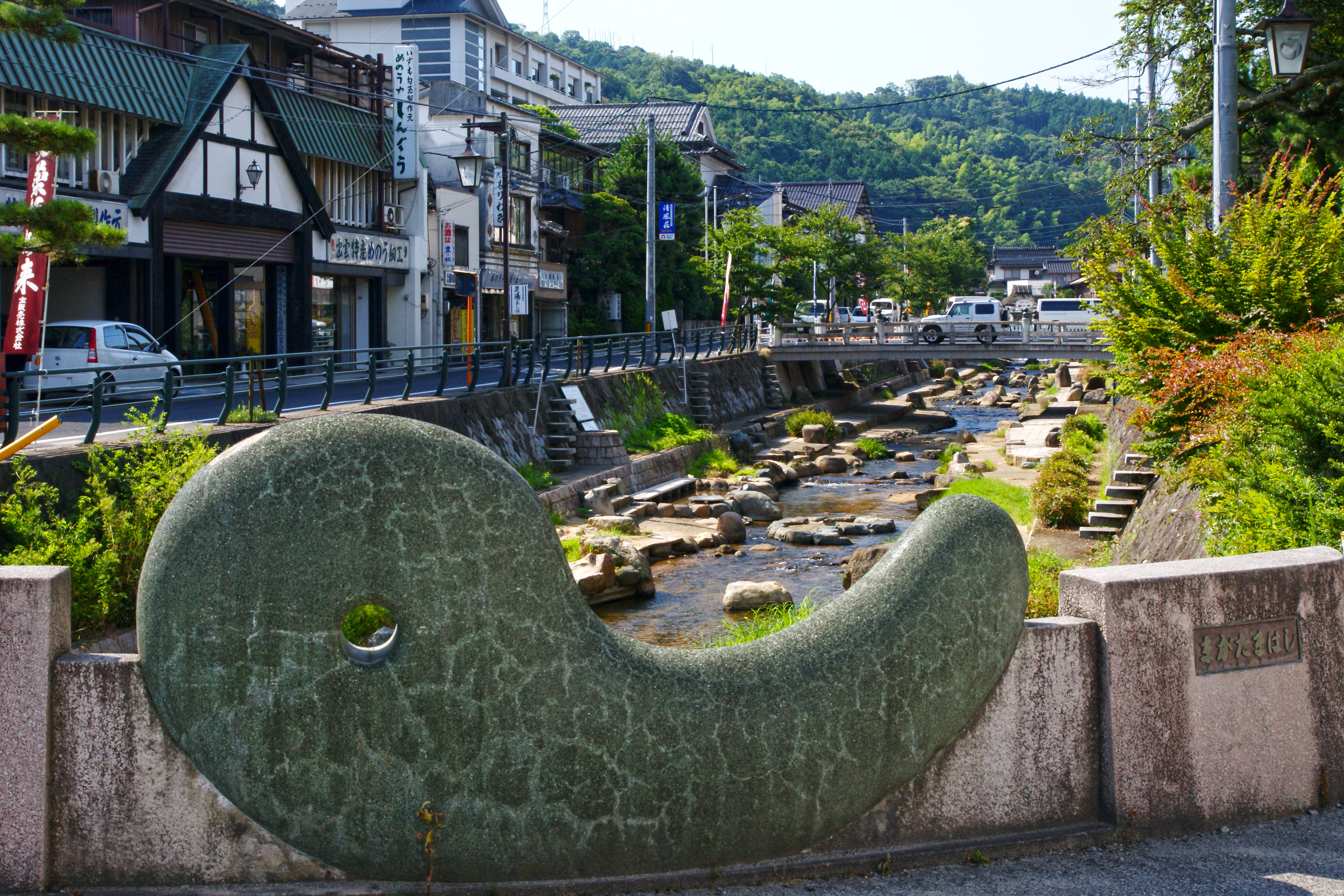
The Magatama bridge of Tamatsukuri Onsen

Tamatsukuri Onsen (玉造温泉) is an onsen hot spring located in Tamayu, Shimane Prefecture. The closest large city to the onsen is Matsue, which can be accessed by car, bus, or rail. Tamatsukuri is a noted sulfate spring with water temperatures between 50–70 °C (122–158 °F).

Tamatsukuri Onsen is an ancient hot spring, dating back to the 8th century where gods are said to bathe once a year since the creation of Japan according to the myth of Izanagi and Izanami. The onsen is mentioned as early as 733 in an entry in the Izumo Fudoki, an ancient record of the culture and geography of Izumo Province.

The waters of Tamatsukuri are said to aid in the recovery from several ailments such as rheumatism, skin conditions, etc. The mineral content of the water is said to be beneficial to the skin, and is a popular destination with those interested in the area's ancient history, and its beauty benefits.

== Images ==
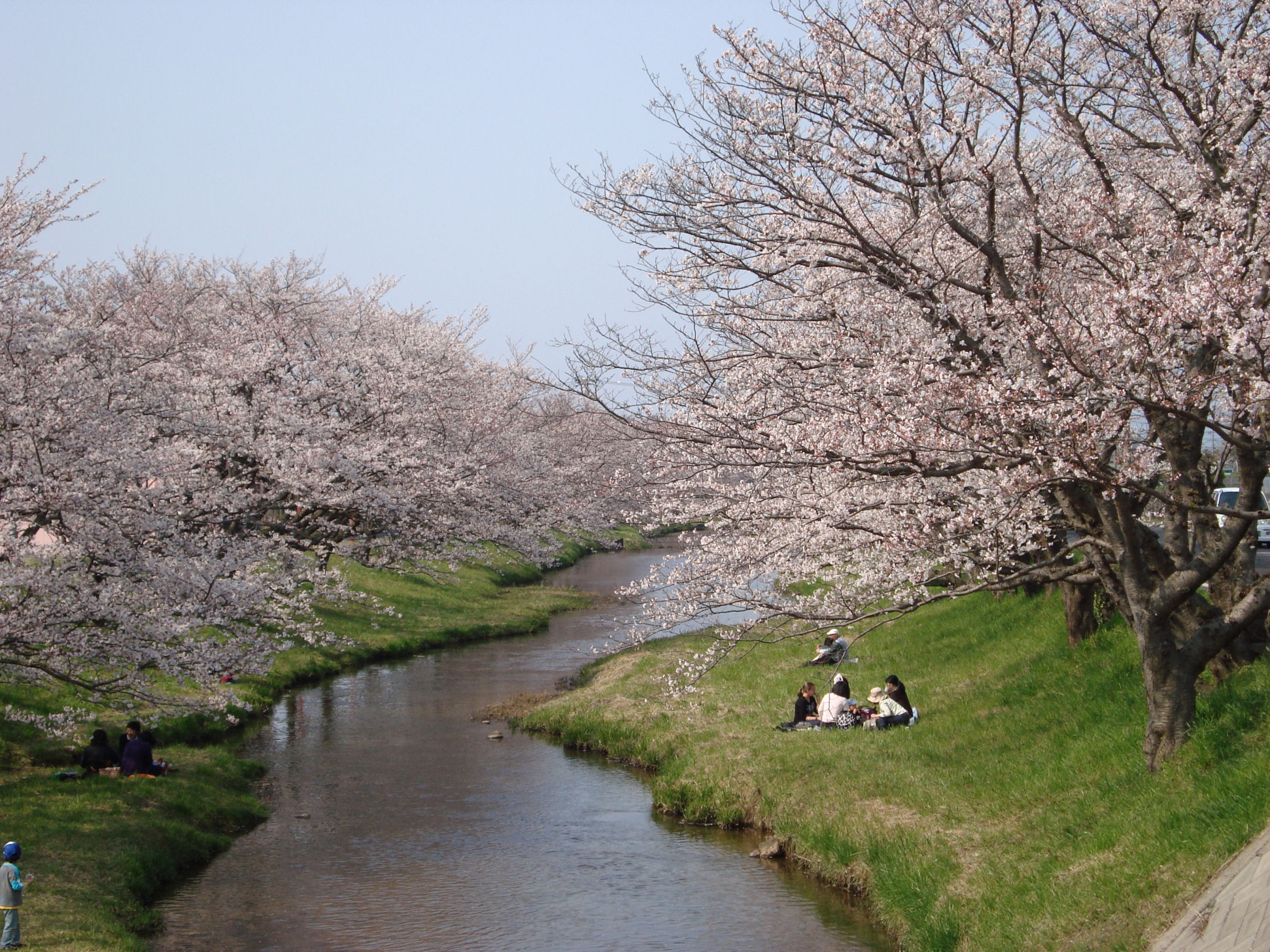
Cherry Blossom by the river

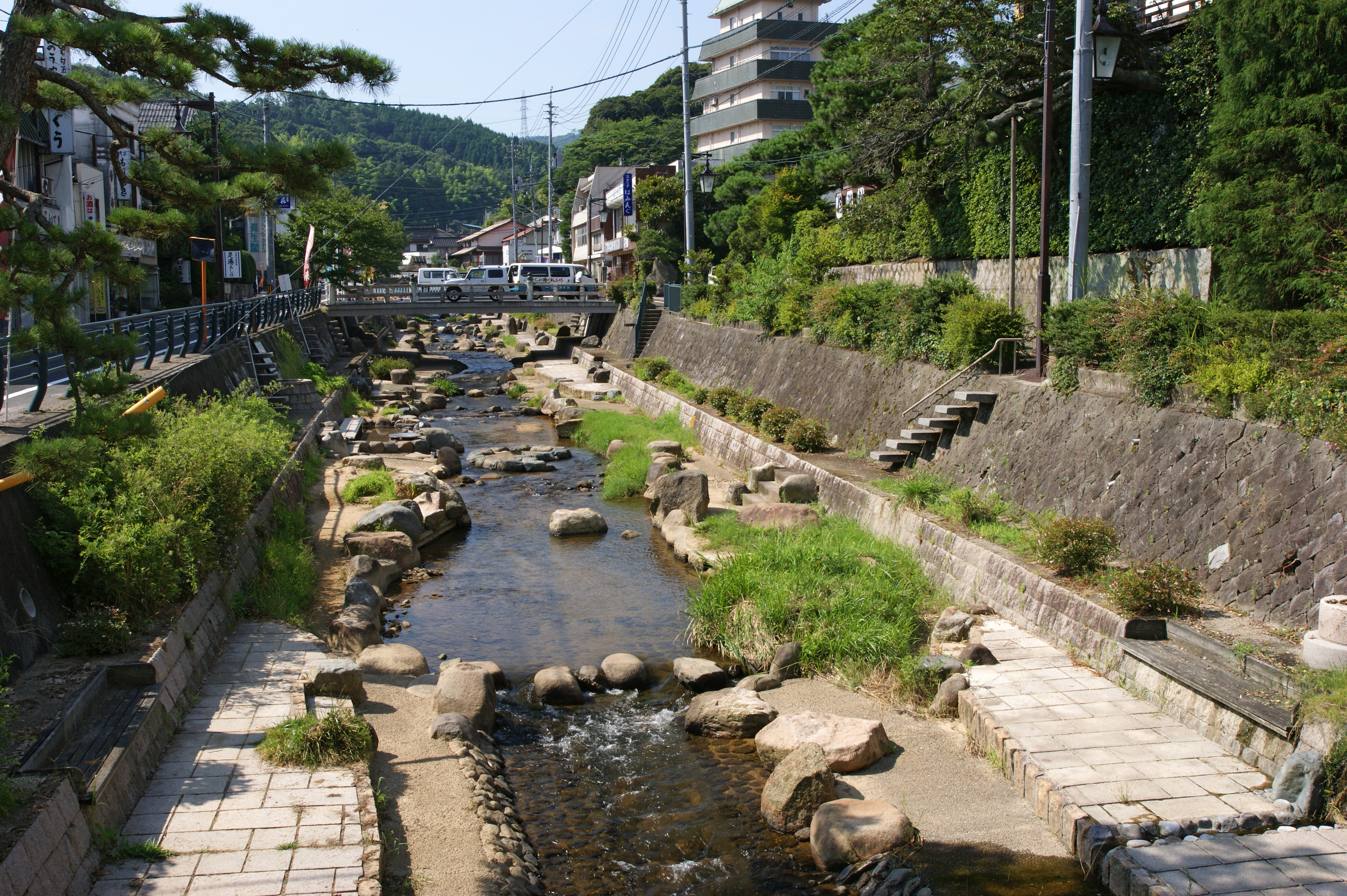
River going through Tamatsukuri Onsen
