= Tsunomori Station =

Railway station in Matsue, Shimane Prefecture, Japan

Tsunomori Station 津ノ森駅
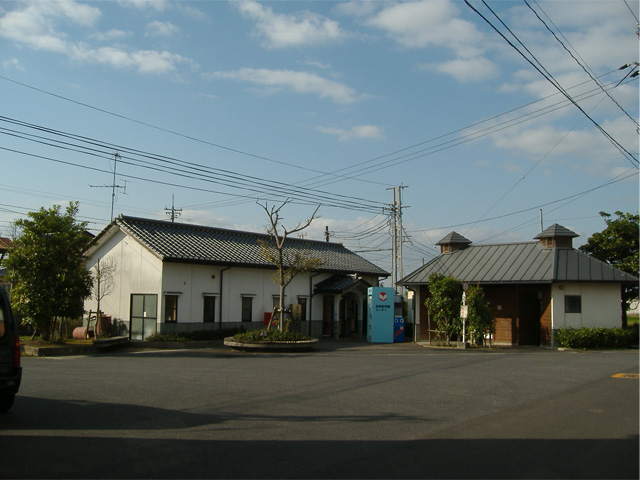
- Tsunomori Station, October 2007

General information
- Location: 117-3 Ono-cho, Matsue-shi, Shimane-ken 690-0264; Japan
- Coordinates: 35°27′59.36″N 132°55′7.52″E
- Operator: Ichibata Electric Railway
- Line: ■ Kita-Matsue Line
- Distance: 21.2 km (13.2 miles) from Dentetsu-Izumoshi
- Platforms: 1 island platform
- Tracks: 2

Construction
- Structure type: at grade

Other information
- Status: Unstaffed
- Station code: 15
- Website: Official website

History
- Opened: 5 April 1928

Passengers
- FY 2019: 194 daily
Location
- Location within Shimane Prefecture Location within Japan

Tsunomori Station (津ノ森駅, Tsunomori-eki) is a passenger railway station located in the city of Matsue, Shimane Prefecture, Japan. It is operated by the private transportation company, Ichibata Electric Railway.

== Lines ==
Tsunomori Station is served by the Kita-Matsue Line, and is located 21.2 kilometers from the terminus of the line at Dentetsu-Izumoshi. Local and express services stop at this station.

== Station layout ==
The station consists of one island platform connected by a level crossing the west side of the platform. The station building was renovated in 1995, and its design resembles a sake brewery. The same design is also used at Aikamachi Station on the same line. The station is unattended.

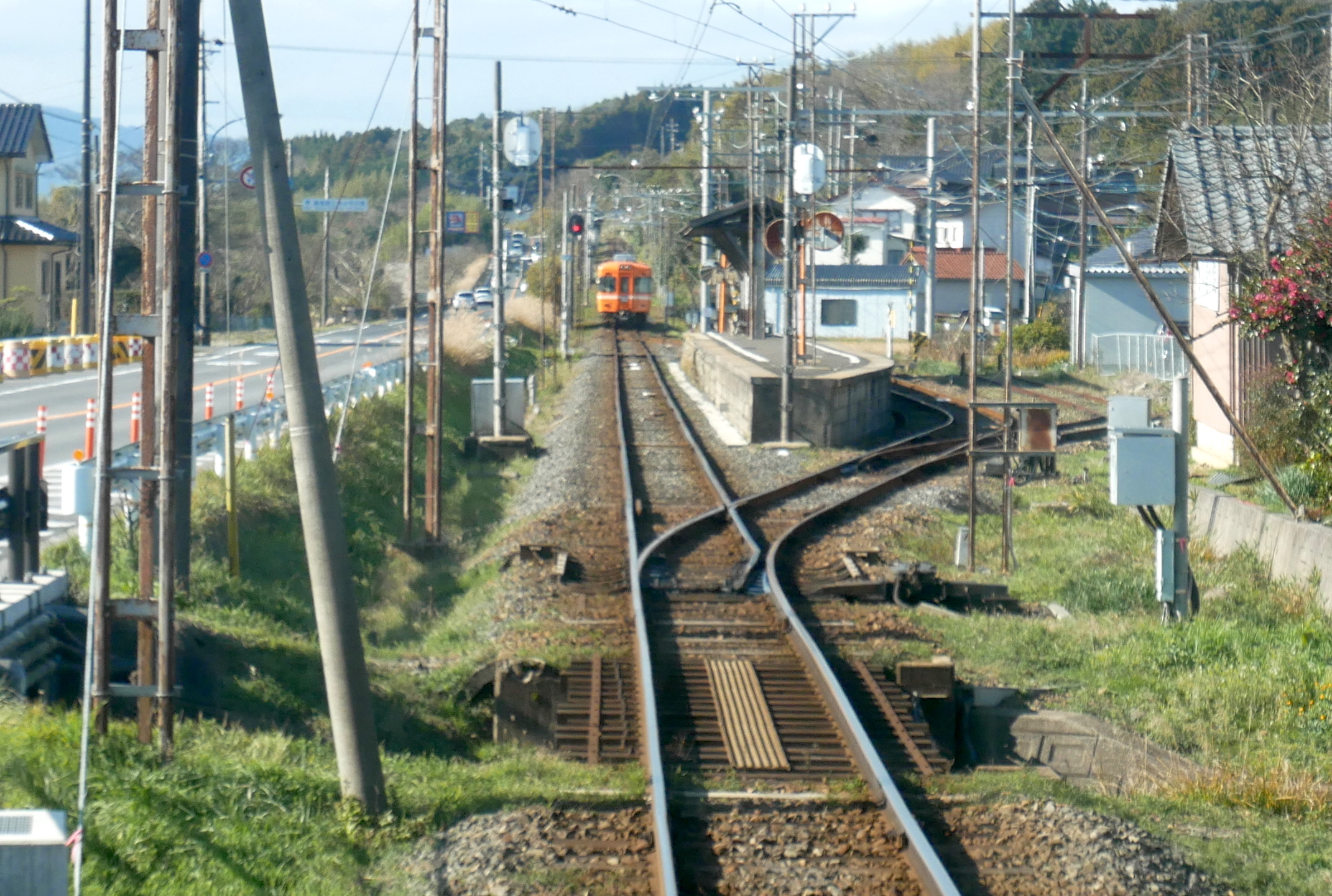
Platforms, 2019

== Adjacent stations ==
«	Service	»
Ichibata Electric Railway
Kita-Matsue Line
Limited Express Superliner: Does not stop at this station
Ichibataguchi	Express Izumotaisha	Matsue Vogel Park
Ichibataguchi	Express	Aikamachi
Inonada	Local	Takanomiya

== History ==
Tsunomori Station was opened on 5 April 1928.

== Passenger statistics ==
In fiscal 2019, the station was used by an average of 194 passengers daily.

== Surrounding area ==
- Matsue Medical Welfare College
- Japan National Route 431
- Lake Shinji

== See also ==
- List of railway stations in Japan
