= Mito, Shimane =

Dissolved municipality in Shimane prefecture, Japan

Mito 美都町
- Former town
- Interactive map of Mito
- Coordinates: 34°41′20″N 131°49′40″E
- Country: Japan
- Prefecture: JP-32
- Merged into: November 1, 2004

Area
  - Total: 132.64 km^{2} (51.21 sq mi)

Population (2003)
  - Total: 2,615
  - Density: 19.72/km^{2} (51.1/sq mi)

Mito (美都町, Mito-chō) was a town located in Mino District, Shimane Prefecture, Japan.

== Population ==
As of 2003, the town had an estimated population of 2,615 and a density of 19.72 persons per km^{2}. The total area was 132.64 km^{2}.

== History ==
On November 1, 2004, Mito, along with the town of Hikimi (also from Mino District), was merged into the expanded city of Masuda.

== Sister cities ==
Mito had a sister city agreement with the town of Wānaka in New Zealand, as both had maze attractions in their towns.
