= Yakumo, Shimane =

Dissolved municipality in Shimane prefecture, Japan

Yakumo (八雲村, Yakumo-mura) was a village located in Yatsuka District, Shimane Prefecture, Japan.

As of 2003, the village had an estimated population of 6,931 and a density of 123.77 persons per km^{2}. The total area was 56.00 km^{2}.

On March 31, 2005, Yakumo, along with the towns of Kashima, Mihonoseki, Shimane, Shinji, Tamayu and Yatsuka (all from Yatsuka District), was merged into the expanded city of Matsue.
