= Hikimi, Shimane =

Dissolved municipality in Shimane prefecture, Japan

Hikimi (匹見町, Hikimi-chō) was a town located in Mino District, Shimane Prefecture, Japan.

As of 2003, the town had an estimated population of 1,700 and a density of 5.67 persons per km^{2}. The total area was 300.08 km^{2}.

On November 1, 2004, Hikimi, along with the town of Mito (also in Mino District), was merged into the expanded city of Masuda.
