= Shimane, Shimane =

Dissolved municipality in Shimane prefecture, Japan

Shimane (島根町, Shimane-chō) was a town located in Yatsuka District, Shimane Prefecture, Japan.

== Population ==
As of 2003, the town had an estimated population of 9,292 and a density of 129.92 persons per km^{2}. The total area was 29.92 km^{2}.

== History ==
On March 31, 2005, Shimane, along with the towns of Kashima, Mihonoseki, Shinji, Tamayu and Yatsuka, and the village of Yakumo (all from Yatsuka District), was merged into the expanded city of Matsue.
