= Shinji, Shimane =

Dissolved municipality in Shimane prefecture, Japan

Shinji (宍道町, Shinji-chō) was a town located in Yatsuka District, Shimane Prefecture, Japan.

As of 2003, the town had an estimated population of 9,483 and a density of 157.60 per km^{2}. The total area was 60.17 km^{2}.

On March 31, 2005, Shinji, along with the towns of Kashima, Mihonoseki, Shimane, Tamayu and Yatsuka, and the village of Yakumo (all from Yatsuka District), was merged into the expanded city of Matsue.
