= Higashiizumo, Shimane =

Dissolved municipality in Shimane prefecture, Japan

Coordinates: 35°26′N 133°9′E

Location of Higashiizumo in Shimane Prefecture

Higashiizumo (東出雲町, Higashiizumo-chō) was a town located in Yatsuka District, Shimane Prefecture, Japan.

As of 2003, the town had an estimated population of 13,817 and a density of 324.04 per km^{2}. The total area was 42.64 km^{2}.

On August 1, 2011, Higashiizumo was merged into the expanded city of Matsue and no longer exists as an independent municipality. Yatsuka District was dissolved as a result of this merger.
