= Yatsuka District, Shimane =

Former district in Shimane prefecture, Japan

Coordinates: 35°27′54″N 133°03′04″E

Yatsuka (八束郡, Yatsuka-gun) was a district located in Shimane Prefecture, Japan.

As of 2003, the district had an estimated population of 59,733 and a density of 169.95 persons per km^{2}. The total area was 351.47 km^{2}.

Yatsuka District is notable for being the birthplace of sumo wrestler Jinmaku, the 12th Yokozuna in 1829. Yatsuka was known as Izumo Province at the time. Jinmaku is renowned for being the only wrestler never to lose a bout as Yokozuna.

== Towns and villages ==
- Higashiizumo
- Kashima
- Mihonoseki
- Shimane
- Shinji
- Tamayu
- Yatsuka
- Yakumo

== Merger ==
- On March 31, 2005 - the towns of Kashima, Mihonoseki, Shimane, Shinji, Tamayu and Yatsuka, and the village of Yakumo were merged into the expanded city of Matsue.
- On August 1, 2011 - the town of Higashiizumo was merged into the expanded city of Matsue. Yatsuka District was dissolved as a result of this merger.
