= Mino District, Shimane =

Former district in Shimane prefecture, Japan

Mino (美濃郡, Mino-gun) was a district located in Shimane Prefecture, Japan.

As of 2004, the population before dissolution was 4,315 with the total area of 432.72 km^{2}.

== Former towns and villages ==
- Hikimi
- Mito

== Merger ==
- On November 1, 2004 - the towns of Hikimi and Mito were merged into the expanded city of Masuda. Therefore, Mino District was dissolved as a result of this merger.

== See also ==
- List of dissolved districts of Japan
