= Kashima, Shimane =

Dissolved municipality in Japan

Kashima (鹿島町, Kashima-chō) was a town located in Yatsuka District, Shimane Prefecture, Japan.

As of 2003, the town had an estimated population of 8,071 and a density of 277.93 persons per km^{2}. The total area was 29.04 km^{2}.

On March 31, 2005, Kashima, along with the towns of Mihonoseki, Shimane, Shinji, Tamayu and Yatsuka, and the village of Yakumo (all from Yatsuka District), was merged into the expanded city of Matsue.
