= Tamayu, Shimane =

Dissolved municipality in Shimane prefecture, Japan

Tamayu (玉湯町, Tamayu-chō) was a Japanese town in Yatsuka District, Shimane Prefecture.

== Population ==
As of 2003, the town had an estimated population of 6,063 and a density of 164.58 per km^{2}. The total area was 36.84 km^{2}.

== History ==
On March 31, 2005, Tamayu, along with the towns of Kashima, Mihonoseki, Shimane, Shinji and Yatsuka, and the village of Yakumo (all from Yatsuka District), was merged into the expanded city of Matsue.
