= Yatsuka, Shimane =

Dissolved municipality in Shimane prefecture, Japan

Yatsuka (八束町, Yatsuka-chō) was a town located in Yatsuka District, Shimane Prefecture, Japan.

As of 2003, the town had an estimated population of 4,535 and a density of 132.87 persons per km^{2}. The total area was 34.13 km^{2}.

On March 31, 2005, Yatsuka, along with the towns of Kashima, Mihonoseki, Shimane, Shinji and Tamayu, and the village of Yakumo (all from Yatsuka District), was merged into the expanded city of Matsue.
