= Matsue =

Matsue 松江市
- Prefecture capital and Core city
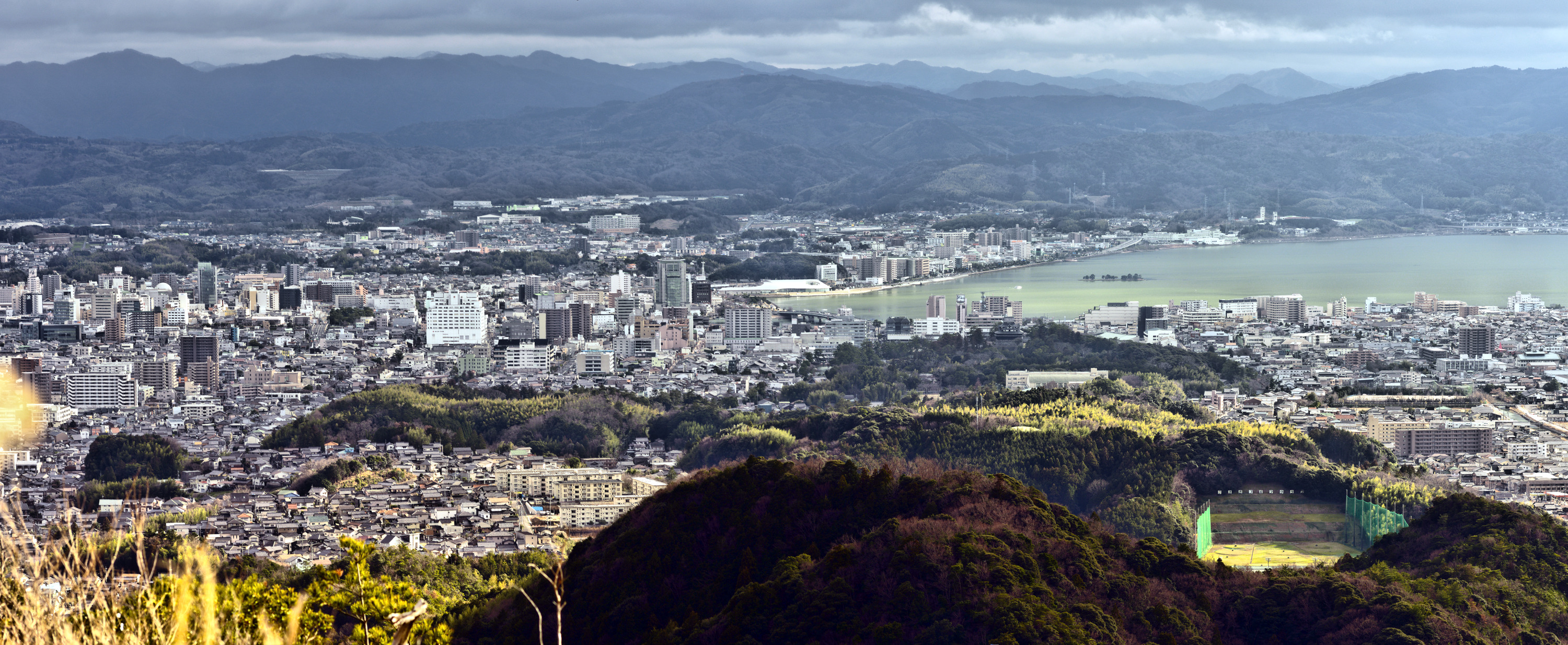
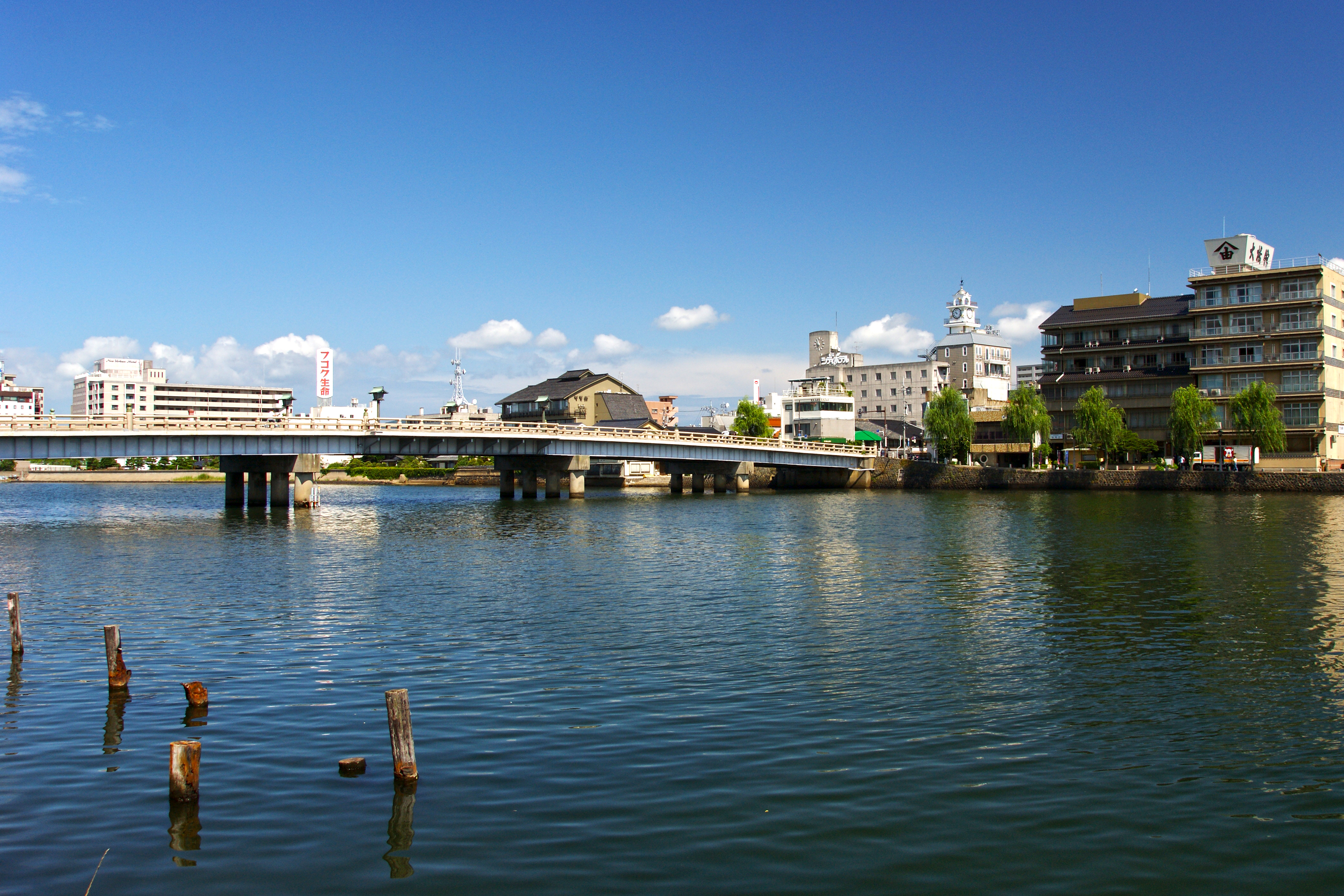
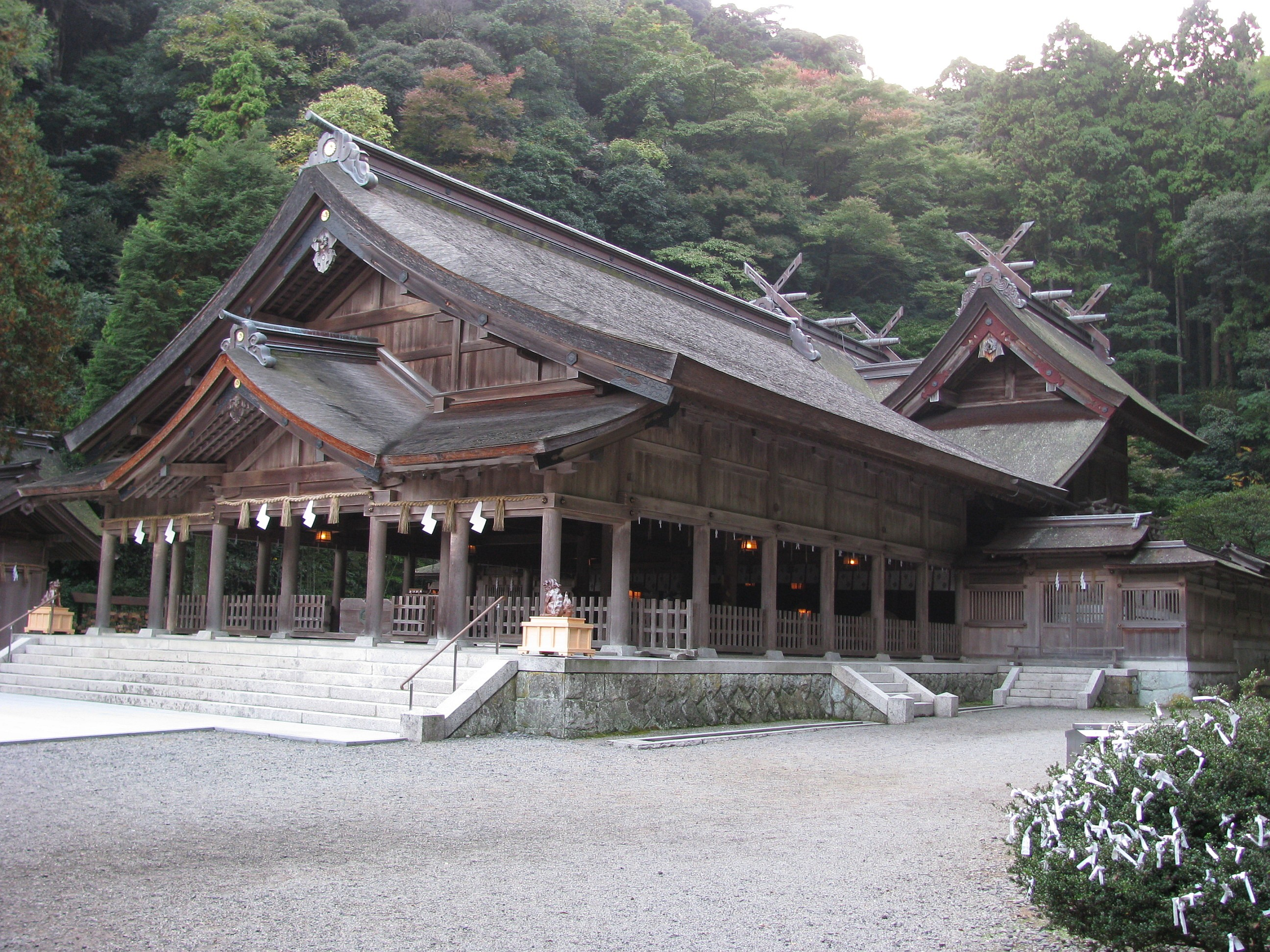
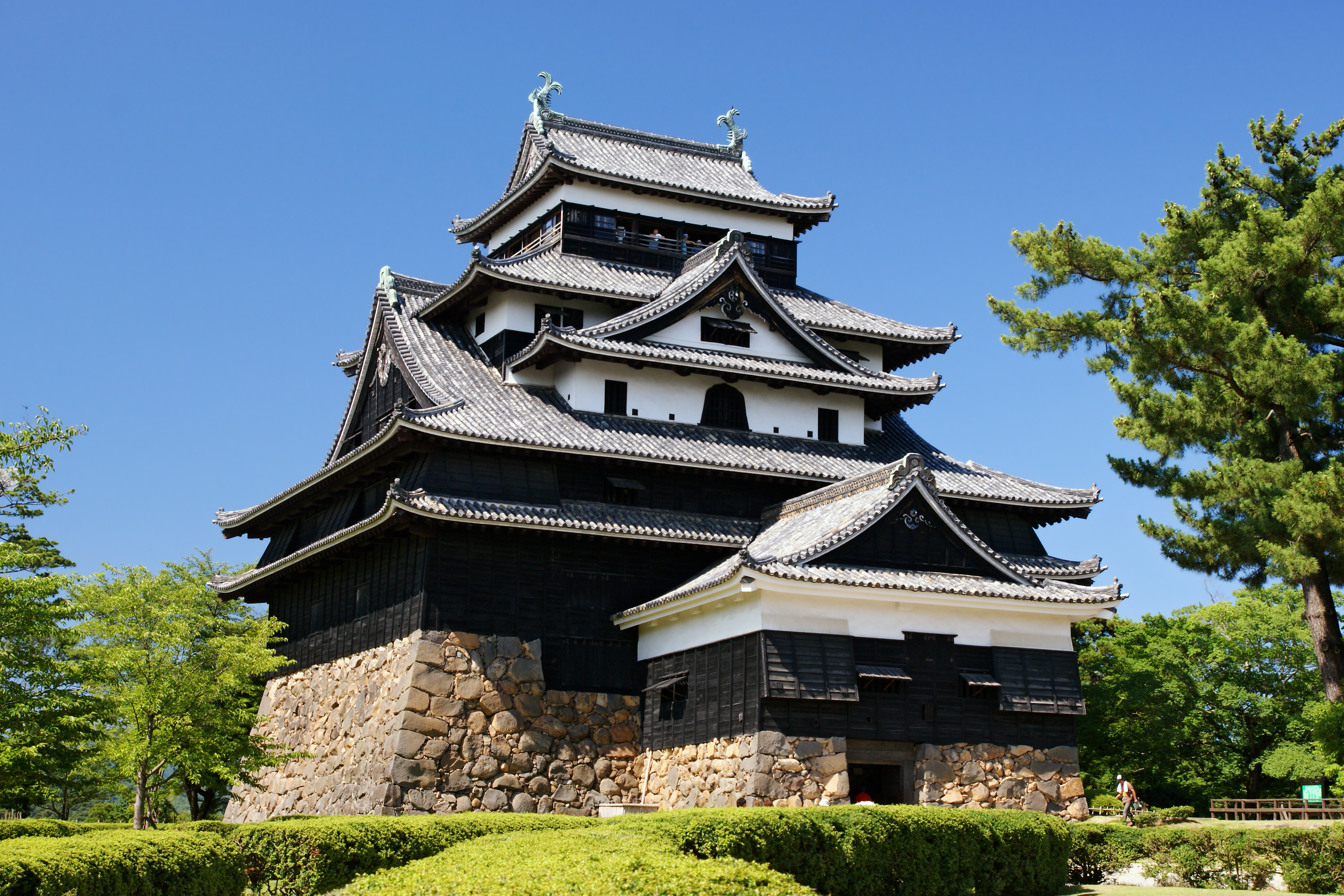
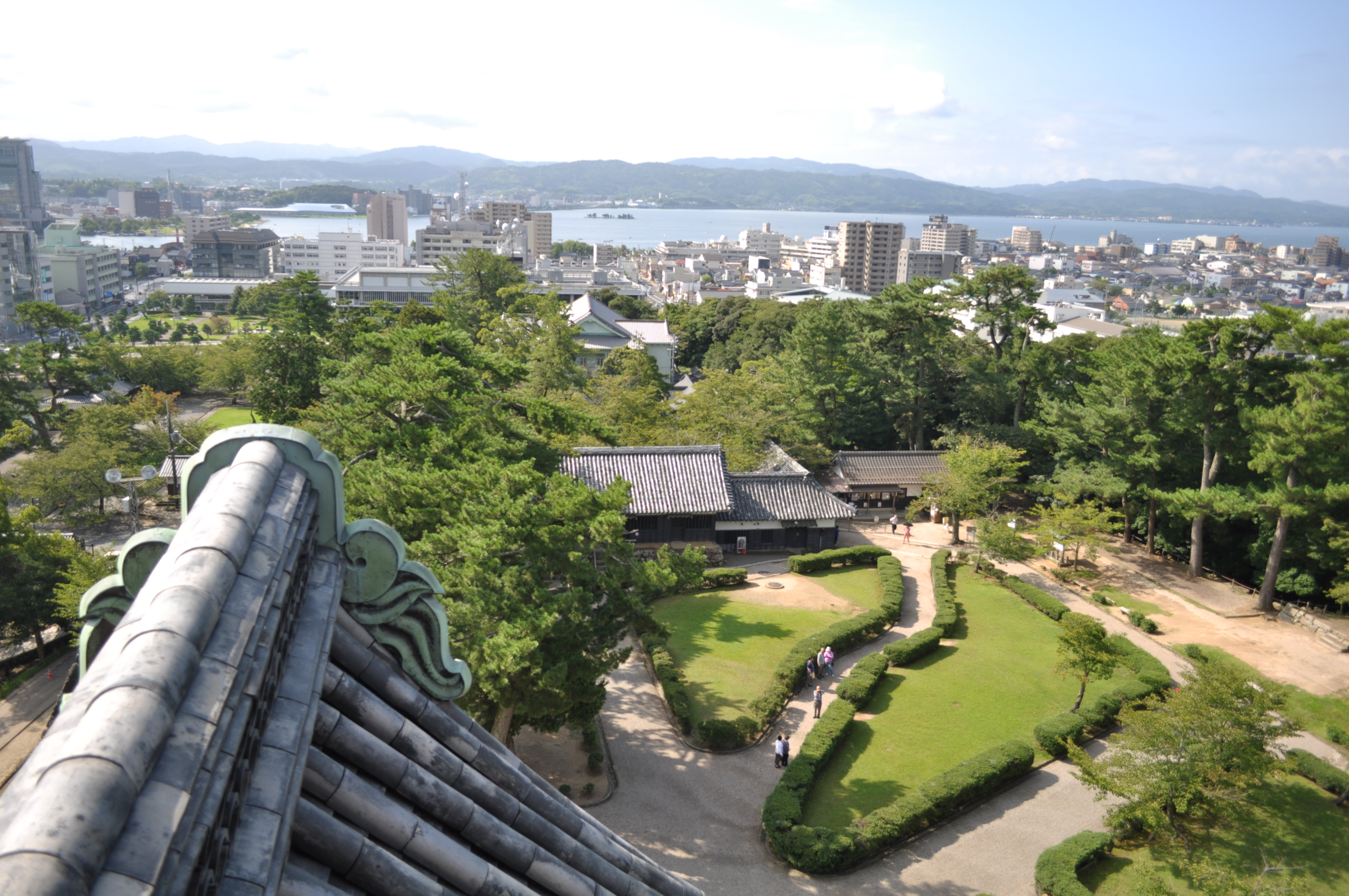
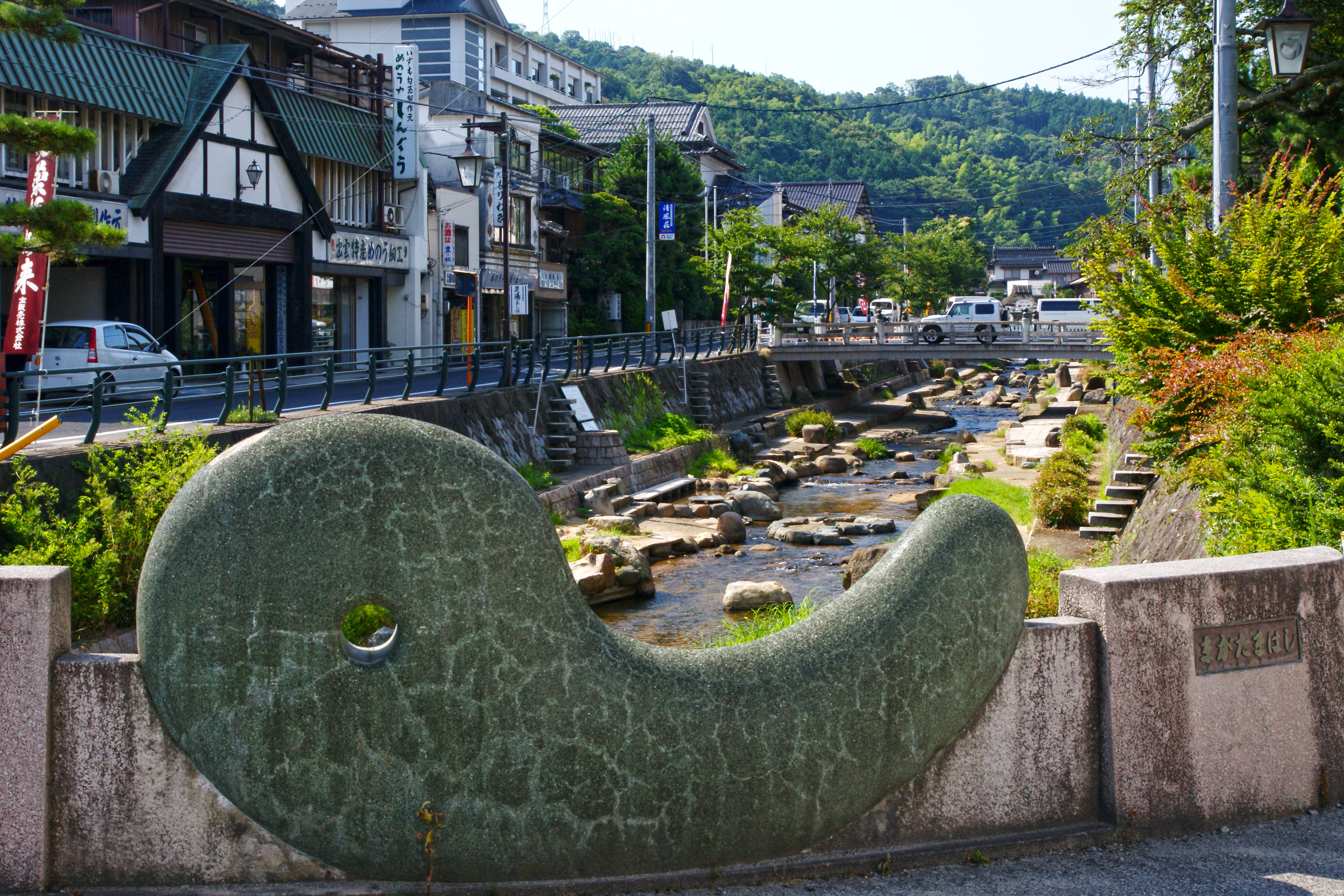
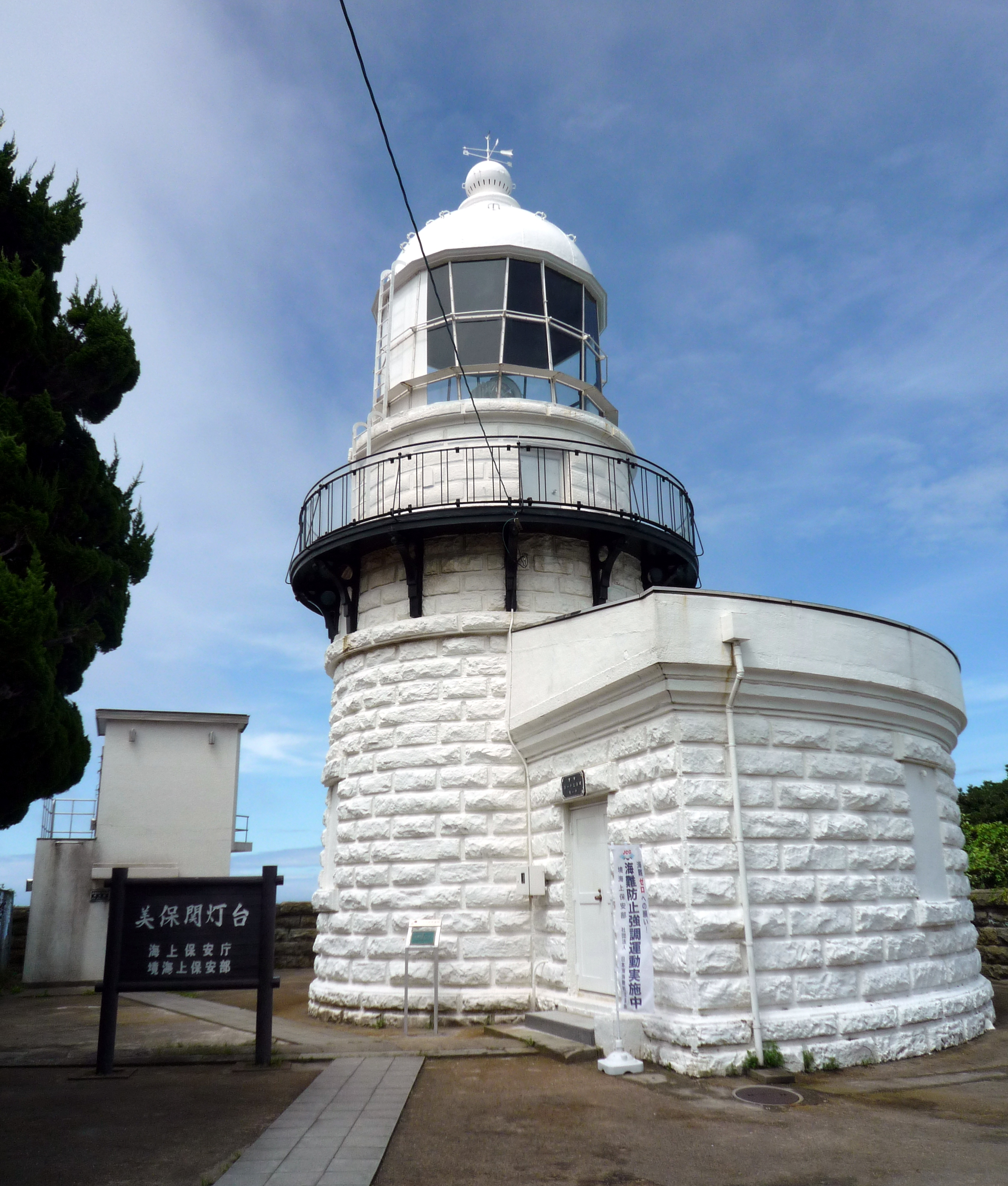
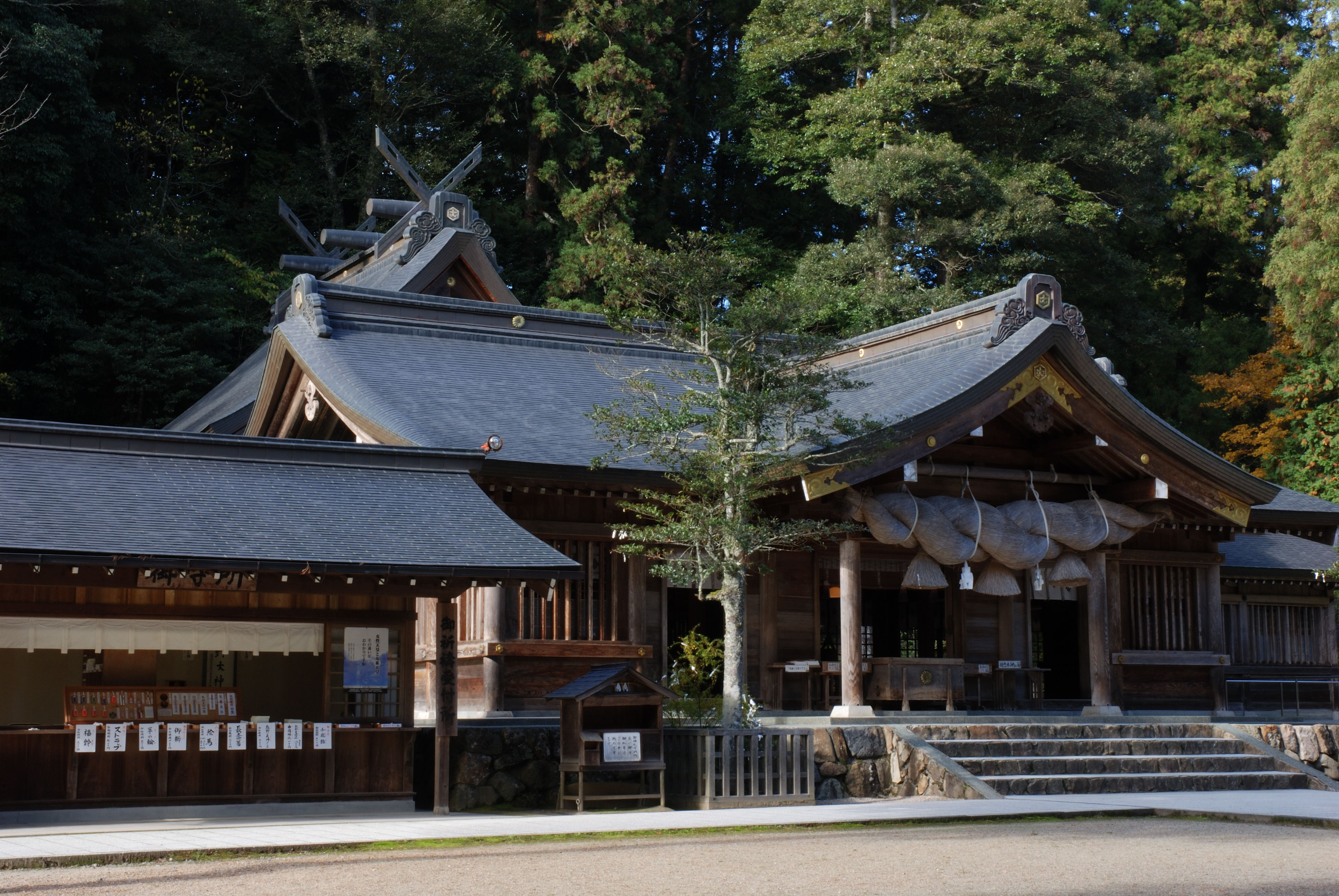
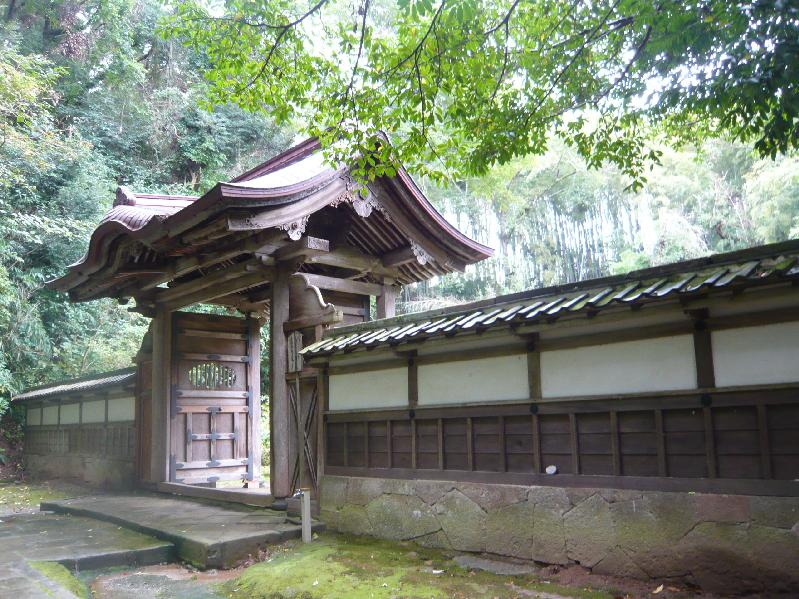
- Skyline of Matsue from Mt. Shinyama Ohashi River Miho Shrine Matsue Castle Lake Shinji Tamatsukuri Onsen Mihonoseki Lighthouse Kumano Taisha Gesshō-ji

- Flag Emblem
- Interactive map of Matsue
- Location in Japan
- Coordinates: 35°28′05″N 133°02′55″E
- Country: Japan
- Region: Chūgoku (San'in)
- Prefecture: Shimane

Government
  - Mayor: Uesada Akihito (since April 2021) (Ind.)

Area
  - Total: 572.99 km^{2} (221.23 sq mi)

Population (March 31, 2023)
  - Total: 196,748
  - Density: 343.37/km^{2} (889.33/sq mi)
- Time zone: UTC+09:00 (JST)
- City hall address: 86 Suetsugu, Matsue-shi, Shimane-ken 690-8540
- Climate: Cfa
- Website: Official website
- Symbols
- Flower: Camellia, Peony
- Tree: Pinus, Cherry blossom

Matsue (松江市, Matsue-shi; Japanese pronunciation: [mä̀.t͡sɨ́.é̞(.ɕì)]) is the capital city of Shimane Prefecture, Japan, located in the Chūgoku region of Honshu. As of 31 March 2023, the city had an estimated population of 196,748 in 91287 households and a population density of 340 persons per km^{2}. The total area of the city is 572.99 square kilometres (221.23 sq mi). Matsue is home to the Tokugawa-era Matsue Castle, one of the last surviving feudal castles in Japan.

== Geography ==
Matsue is located at the northernmost point of Shimane Prefecture, between Lake Shinji and Nakaumi on the banks of the Ohashi River connecting the two lakes, though the city proper reaches the Sea of Japan coast. Matsue is the center of the Lake Shinji-Nakaumi metropolitan area, which has a population of approximately 600,000 in 2020. The Lake Shinji-Nakaumi metropolitan area is the fourth largest on the Sea of Japan coast after Niigata, Greater Kanazawa, and Fukui.

=== Climate ===
Matsue has a humid subtropical climate (Köppen climate classification Cfa) with very warm summers and cool winters. Precipitation is abundant throughout the year, and is somewhat heavier in June, July and September. The average annual temperature in Matsue is 15.2 °C (59.4 °F). The average annual rainfall is 1,791.9 mm (70.55 in) with July as the wettest month. The temperatures are highest on average in August, at around 27.1 °C (80.8 °F), and lowest in January, at around 4.6 °C (40.3 °F). The highest temperature ever recorded in Matsue was 38.5 °C (101.3 °F) on 1 August 1994; the coldest temperature ever recorded was −8.7 °C (16.3 °F) on 19 February 1977.

Climate data for Matsue (1991−2020 normals, extremes 1940−present)
Month	Jan	Feb	Mar	Apr	May	Jun	Jul	Aug	Sep	Oct	Nov	Dec	Year
Record high °C (°F)	20.6 (69.1)	24.7 (76.5)	27.4 (81.3)	30.7 (87.3)	32.9 (91.2)	35.1 (95.2)	37.2 (99.0)	38.5 (101.3)	36.1 (97.0)	32.1 (89.8)	28.1 (82.6)	23.4 (74.1)	38.5 (101.3)
Mean maximum °C (°F)	14.5 (58.1)	17.0 (62.6)	21.6 (70.9)	26.4 (79.5)	29.6 (85.3)	32.0 (89.6)	34.7 (94.5)	35.9 (96.6)	32.7 (90.9)	28.3 (82.9)	22.8 (73.0)	17.1 (62.8)	36.1 (97.0)
Mean daily maximum °C (°F)	8.3 (46.9)	9.4 (48.9)	13.1 (55.6)	18.5 (65.3)	23.2 (73.8)	26.2 (79.2)	29.8 (85.6)	31.6 (88.9)	27.1 (80.8)	22.0 (71.6)	16.5 (61.7)	10.9 (51.6)	19.7 (67.5)
Daily mean °C (°F)	4.6 (40.3)	5.0 (41.0)	8.0 (46.4)	13.1 (55.6)	18.0 (64.4)	21.7 (71.1)	25.8 (78.4)	27.1 (80.8)	22.9 (73.2)	17.4 (63.3)	12.0 (53.6)	7.0 (44.6)	15.2 (59.4)
Mean daily minimum °C (°F)	1.5 (34.7)	1.3 (34.3)	3.6 (38.5)	8.2 (46.8)	13.5 (56.3)	18.2 (64.8)	22.8 (73.0)	23.8 (74.8)	19.6 (67.3)	13.4 (56.1)	8.0 (46.4)	3.6 (38.5)	11.4 (52.5)
Mean minimum °C (°F)	−2.7 (27.1)	−2.7 (27.1)	−1.4 (29.5)	1.9 (35.4)	8.2 (46.8)	13.5 (56.3)	19.1 (66.4)	20.1 (68.2)	14.1 (57.4)	7.8 (46.0)	2.8 (37.0)	−0.7 (30.7)	−3.6 (25.5)
Record low °C (°F)	−6.9 (19.6)	−8.7 (16.3)	−4.7 (23.5)	−2.1 (28.2)	2.4 (36.3)	7.8 (46.0)	12.9 (55.2)	15.3 (59.5)	7.9 (46.2)	1.6 (34.9)	−2.4 (27.7)	−7.5 (18.5)	−8.7 (16.3)
Average precipitation mm (inches)	153.3 (6.04)	118.4 (4.66)	134.0 (5.28)	113.0 (4.45)	130.3 (5.13)	173.0 (6.81)	234.1 (9.22)	129.6 (5.10)	204.1 (8.04)	126.1 (4.96)	121.6 (4.79)	154.5 (6.08)	1,791.9 (70.55)
Average snowfall cm (inches)	28 (11)	25 (9.8)	6 (2.4)	0 (0)	0 (0)	0 (0)	0 (0)	0 (0)	0 (0)	0 (0)	0 (0)	11 (4.3)	68 (27)
Average precipitation days (≥ 0.5 mm)	21.1	16.9	15.0	11.6	10.4	12.0	12.7	10.6	12.6	12.0	14.9	19.8	169.7
Average relative humidity (%)	76	74	72	70	71	78	80	77	79	76	76	76	75
Mean monthly sunshine hours	67.4	88.6	140.5	182.4	206.5	157.1	168.6	201.0	146.2	154.4	113.8	78.8	1,705.2
Source: Japan Meteorological Agency

Climate data for Kashima, Matsue (1991−2020 normals, extremes 1978−present)
Month	Jan	Feb	Mar	Apr	May	Jun	Jul	Aug	Sep	Oct	Nov	Dec	Year
Record high °C (°F)	19.3 (66.7)	22.7 (72.9)	26.8 (80.2)	29.3 (84.7)	31.8 (89.2)	35.1 (95.2)	36.8 (98.2)	37.5 (99.5)	35.8 (96.4)	31.7 (89.1)	27.4 (81.3)	22.2 (72.0)	37.5 (99.5)
Mean daily maximum °C (°F)	8.3 (46.9)	9.1 (48.4)	12.5 (54.5)	17.8 (64.0)	22.5 (72.5)	25.6 (78.1)	29.1 (84.4)	30.7 (87.3)	26.7 (80.1)	21.8 (71.2)	16.5 (61.7)	11.1 (52.0)	19.3 (66.8)
Daily mean °C (°F)	4.8 (40.6)	5.0 (41.0)	7.7 (45.9)	12.5 (54.5)	17.4 (63.3)	21.1 (70.0)	25.1 (77.2)	26.3 (79.3)	22.3 (72.1)	16.9 (62.4)	11.8 (53.2)	7.1 (44.8)	14.8 (58.7)
Mean daily minimum °C (°F)	1.3 (34.3)	0.9 (33.6)	2.6 (36.7)	6.9 (44.4)	12.3 (54.1)	17.3 (63.1)	21.8 (71.2)	22.6 (72.7)	18.4 (65.1)	12.3 (54.1)	7.4 (45.3)	3.4 (38.1)	10.6 (51.1)
Record low °C (°F)	−6.6 (20.1)	−9.9 (14.2)	−4.5 (23.9)	−2.3 (27.9)	2.5 (36.5)	9.1 (48.4)	12.3 (54.1)	14.7 (58.5)	7.3 (45.1)	3.0 (37.4)	−0.8 (30.6)	−3.5 (25.7)	−9.9 (14.2)
Average precipitation mm (inches)	143.7 (5.66)	108.0 (4.25)	124.9 (4.92)	105.6 (4.16)	121.5 (4.78)	166.9 (6.57)	224.8 (8.85)	136.4 (5.37)	198.9 (7.83)	122.6 (4.83)	131.8 (5.19)	157.7 (6.21)	1,742.8 (68.61)
Average precipitation days (≥ 1.0 mm)	18.4	14.4	13.2	9.8	9.1	10.7	11.8	9.5	11.5	10.6	13.4	17.9	150.3
Mean monthly sunshine hours	55.8	81.0	142.1	192.4	215.8	163.8	181.6	214.9	156.9	157.8	105.8	67.1	1,735.1
Source: Japan Meteorological Agency

=== Demographics ===
Per Japanese census data, the population of Matsue in 2020 is 203,616 people. Matsue has been conducting censuses since 1920.

Historical population

Year	Pop.	±%
1920	118,138	—
1925	122,592	+3.8%
1930	129,262	+5.4%
1935	135,250	+4.6%
1940	134,221	−0.8%
1945	154,617	+15.2%
1950	159,374	+3.1%

Year	Pop.	±%
1955	166,907	+4.7%
1960	168,375	+0.9%
1965	169,153	+0.5%
1970	175,399	+3.7%
1975	184,157	+5.0%
1980	194,173	+5.4%
1985	201,026	+3.5%

Year	Pop.	±%
1990	203,298	+1.1%
1995	206,718	+1.7%
2000	211,564	+2.3%
2005	210,796	−0.4%
2010	207,682	−1.5%
2015	206,230	−0.7%
2020	203,616	−1.3%

Matsue population statistics

== History ==
City view from Matsue Castle, 2019

Matsue is located within ancient Izumo Province and there are many archaeological sites from the Yayoi, Kofun and Nara periods within the city borders. The area was also the stronghold of the Amago clan during the Sengoku period. The present-day castle town of Matsue was originally established by Horio Yoshiharu, lord of the Matsue clan, when he built Matsue castle and planned the surrounding town over a five-year period from 1607 to 1611. Matsue continued to be the seat of Matsue Domain under the Tokugawa shogunate until the Meiji restoration. Horio Yoshiharu's son Tadauji died before his father, thus the province was inherited by his grandson Tadaharu. However, Tadaharu died childless so the province was passed on to the Kyōgoku. Kyōgoku Takatsugu served Oda Nobunaga and Toyotomi Hideyoshi. Takatsugu's son Tadataka married the 4th daughter of Hidetada, Hatsu. He served in the Battle of Osaka and reportedly took 300 heads. In 1634, he received the province of Izumo, succeeding the childless Horio Tadaharu. During his rule he was instrumental in engineering projects that helped control the flow of the Hiikawa river.

In 1637, Tadataka also died childless and the domain passed to the Matsudaira clan. Naomasa was the third son of Tokugawa Hideyasu. Hideyasu, daimyō of Echizen Province, himself was the second son of Tokugawa Ieyasu, making Naomasa the grandson of the first Tokugawa Shōgun. Naomasa made a name for himself fighting in the Battle of Osaka at the age of 14. He was daimyō of Ono in Echizen and later Matsumoto in Shinano Province before becoming the ruler of Izumo 1638. Unlike the previous rulers Naomasa had children and his heirs managed to keep Izumo for ten generations until the end of the Edo period. Overall, ten Matsudaira daimyō ruled Matsue. The most famous after the first (Matsudaira Naomasa) is the seventh, Matsudaira Harusato, more commonly referred to as Fumai (不昧公). He revolutionized the administrative system of the Matsue clan which was in financial difficulties and put it back on its feet. He invested in mulberry bushes and promoted special foods like shijimi clams that were a delicacy in Matsue. Harusato was a great enthusiast of Japanese tea ceremony. Because of his influence on wagashi, Japanese sweets for the tea ceremony from Matsue are famous, especially the one called wakakusa.

=== Municipal timeline ===
- April 1, 1889: the city of Matsue was founded with the creation of the modern municipalities system
- March 31, 2005: Matsue absorbed the towns of Kashima, Mihonoseki, Shimane, Shinji, Tamayu and Yatsuka, and the village of Yakumo, all from Yatsuka District, to create the new and expanded city of Matsue.
- August 1, 2011: the town of Higashiizumo (also from Yatsuka District) was merged into Matsue.
- April 1, 2018: Matsue became a Core city with increased local autonomy

== Government ==
Matsue has a mayor-council form of government with a directly elected mayor and a unicameral city council of 34 members. Matsue contributes 11 members to the Shimane Prefectural Assembly. In terms of national politics, the city is part of the Shimane 1st district of the lower house of the Diet of Japan.

== Economy ==
Matsue is a major regional commercial center and as one of the base cities of the San'in region, and along with Yonago, there are many head offices of companies operating in the San'in region. Agriculture, commercial fishing and tourism play major roles in the local economy; however, the city has only a small industrial base.

== Education ==
=== Universities and colleges ===
- Matsue College of Technology
- Shimane University
- University of Shimane Junior College

=== Primary and secondary education ===
Matsue has 33 public elementary school, 17 public junior high schools and one public high school operated by the city government, and seven public high schools operated by the Shimane Prefectural Board of Education. The prefecture operates five special education schools for the handicapped. There are also four private high schools.

== Transportation ==
=== Railway ===
JR West (JR West) - San'in Main Line

- Shinji - Kimachi - Tamatsukuri-Onsen - Nogi - Matsue - Higashi-Matsue - Iya

JR West (JR West) - Kisuki Line

- Shinji - Minami Shinji

Ichibata Electric Railway (Bataden) - Kita-Matsue Line

- Tsunomori - Takanomiya - Matsue Vogel Park - Aikamachi - Nagae - Asahigaoka - Matsue English Garden Mae - Matsue-Shinjiko-Onsen

=== Highways ===
- Hamada Expressway
- Matsue Expressway
- National Route 9
- National Route 54
- National Route 431
- National Route 432
- National Route 485

=== Air ===
Matsue does not have an airport. The nearest airports are:

- Izumo Airport
- Yonago Airport

== International relations ==
Matsue's sister cities are:

=== International friendship cities ===
- New Orleans, Louisiana, United States, 1990 (commenced)/1994 (official agreement)
- Jilin City, Jilin, China, 1995 (commenced)/1999 (official agreement)
- Jinju, South Gyeongsang, South Korea, 1999 (official agreement)
- Hangzhou, Zhejiang, China, 1994 (commenced)/2003 (official agreement)
- Yinchuan, Ningxia, China, 1994 (commenced)/2004 (official agreement)

Although not an official friendship city of Matsue, there has been ongoing exchange with Dublin, Ireland since 1988 when former mayor Nakamura Yoshijirō visited the city.

=== Sister cities ===
- (Japan) Ōguchi, Aichi
- (Japan) Onomichi, Hiroshima
- (Japan) Suzu, Ishikawa
- (Japan) Takarazuka, Hyōgo
- (United States) New Orleans, Louisiana

== Local attractions ==
- Gesshō-ji, a Buddhist temple known for its hydrangeas and large stone turtle.
- Izumo Kokubun-ji ruins, a National Historic Site.
- Kamosu Jinja
- Kumano Taisha, ichinomiya of Izumo Province
- Lafcadio Hearn Memorial Museum, dedicated to the author Lafcadio Hearn, who taught in Matsue from 1890–1891. Throughout the city there are monuments and landmarks honouring Hearn.
- Matsue Castle, one of the 12 remaining original castles in Japan. It is the second largest, the third tallest and the sixth oldest. The castle grounds include a winding path through mixed forests of bamboo, shrubs and trees, many of which are very old and identified by species. Surrounding the grounds and the castle park is the old moat, "horikawa".
- Miho Jinja
- Sada Jinja in Matsue is the home to Sada Shin Noh, a sacred dance comprising a series of purification rituals related to the changing of the rush mats within the shrine. The mats are held by dancers who then offer them to deities to sit upon. Diverse dance forms are performed on a stage in the shrine accompanied by singing, flute and drums. The performance art is transmitted from generation to generation by the community. In November 2011, Sada Shin Noh was inscribed on the UNESCO Representative List of the Intangible Cultural Heritage of Humanity.
- Shimane Art Museum
- Tamatsukuri Onsen
- Tanabe Art Museum
- Yaegaki Jinja

=== Festivals ===
Various traditional festivals are still held, such as Dōgyōretsu, a drum parade held annually on the third Sunday of October, and Hōranenya, one of Japan's top three boat festivals that is held only once every 10 years (most recently in May 2019).

== Notable people ==
- Mari Funaki, Australian jeweller
- Hiroyuki Hosoda, politician
- Masataka Matsuura, former mayor of Matsue
- Jun Mihara (born 1981), football referee
- Takashi Nagai, physician, Catholic writer
- Kei Nishikori (b. 1989), tennis player, was born in Matsue.
- Wakatsuki Reijirō, former Prime Minister
- Shirō Sano, actor
