= Matsue English Garden Mae Station =

Railway station in Matsue, Shimane Prefecture, Japan

Matsue English Garden Mae Station 松江イングリッシュガーデン前駅
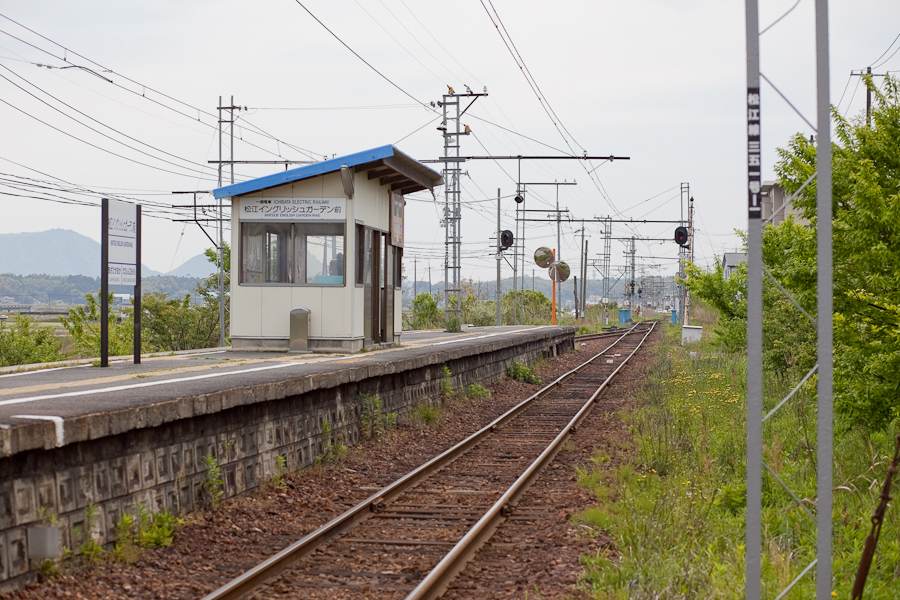
- Station platform

General information
- Location: 264-6 Nishi Hamsada-cho, Matsue-shi, Shimane-ken 690-0122; Japan
- Coordinates: 35°28′38.78″N 133°0′13.83″E
- Operator: Ichibata Electric Railway
- Line: ■ Kita-Matsue Line
- Distance: 29.6 km (18.4 miles) from Dentetsu-Izumoshi
- Platforms: 1 island platform
- Tracks: 2

Construction
- Structure type: at grade

Other information
- Status: Unstaffed
- Station code: 21
- Website: Official website

History
- Opened: 5 April 1928
- Former names: Kososhi (to 1964); Furue (to 2001); Louis C. Tiffany Garden Museum Mae (to 2007)

Passengers
- FY 2019: 109 daily
Location
- Location within Shimane Prefecture Location within Japan

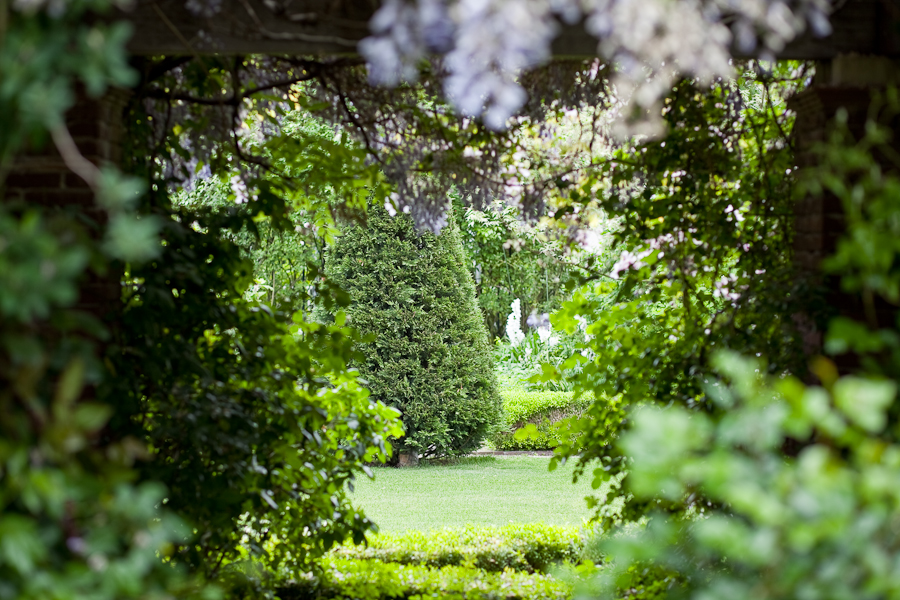
Matsue English Garden

Matsue English Garden Mae Station (松江イングリッシュガーデン前駅, Matsue Ingurisshu Gāden mae-eki) is a passenger railway station located in the city of Matsue, Shimane Prefecture, Japan. It is operated by the private transportation company, Ichibata Electric Railway.

== Lines ==
Matsue English Garden Mae Station is served by the Kita-Matsue Line, and is located 29.6 kilometers from the terminus of the line at Dentetsu-Izumoshi. Local and express services stop at this station.

== Station layout ==
The station consists of one island platform connected to the station building by a level crossing. The station is unattended.

== Adjacent stations ==
«	Service	»
Ichibata Electric Railway
Kita-Matsue Line
Ichibataguchi	Limited Express Superliner	Matsue-Shinjiko-Onsen
Aikamachi	Express Izumotaisha	Matsue-Shinjiko-Onsen
Asahigaoka	Express	Matsue-Shinjiko-Onsen
Asahigaoka	Local	Matsue-Shinjiko-Onsen

== History ==
Matsue English Garden Mae Station was opened on 5 April 1928 as Kososhi Station (許曽志駅). The kanji of the statin name was changed in 1946 to "古曽志駅", retaining the same pronunciation. This was changed again on 1 April 1964 to Furue Station (古江駅). On 2 April 2001, the name was changed to Louis C. Tiffany Garden Museum Mae Station (ルイス・C.ティファニー庭園美術館前駅, Ruisu Shī Tifanī Teien Bijutsukan-mae Eki) which consists of 18 letters and punctuation marks and is written with 23 kana (both countings exclude eki or "Station"), which was the longest station name in Japan. The station was named for a nearby museum for the works of Louis Comfort Tiffany. The station name was changed to its current name on 21 May 2007 as the museum had closed on 31 March 2007.

As of March 2020, the longest station name in Japan is currently a tie between Minamiaso Mizu-no-Umareru-Sato Hakusui-Kōgen Station on the Minami Aso Railway in Kumamoto Prefecture and Chojagahama Shiosai Hamanasu Koenmae Station on the Kashima Rinkai Railway in Ibaraki Prefecture.

== Passenger statistics ==
In fiscal 2019, the station was used by an average of 109 passengers daily.

== Surrounding area ==
- Matsue English Garden
- Shimane Prefectural School for the Blind
- Japan National Route 431
- Lake Shinji

== See also ==
- List of railway stations in Japan
