= Inonada Station =

Railway station in Izumo, Shimane Prefecture, Japan

Inonada Station 伊野灘駅
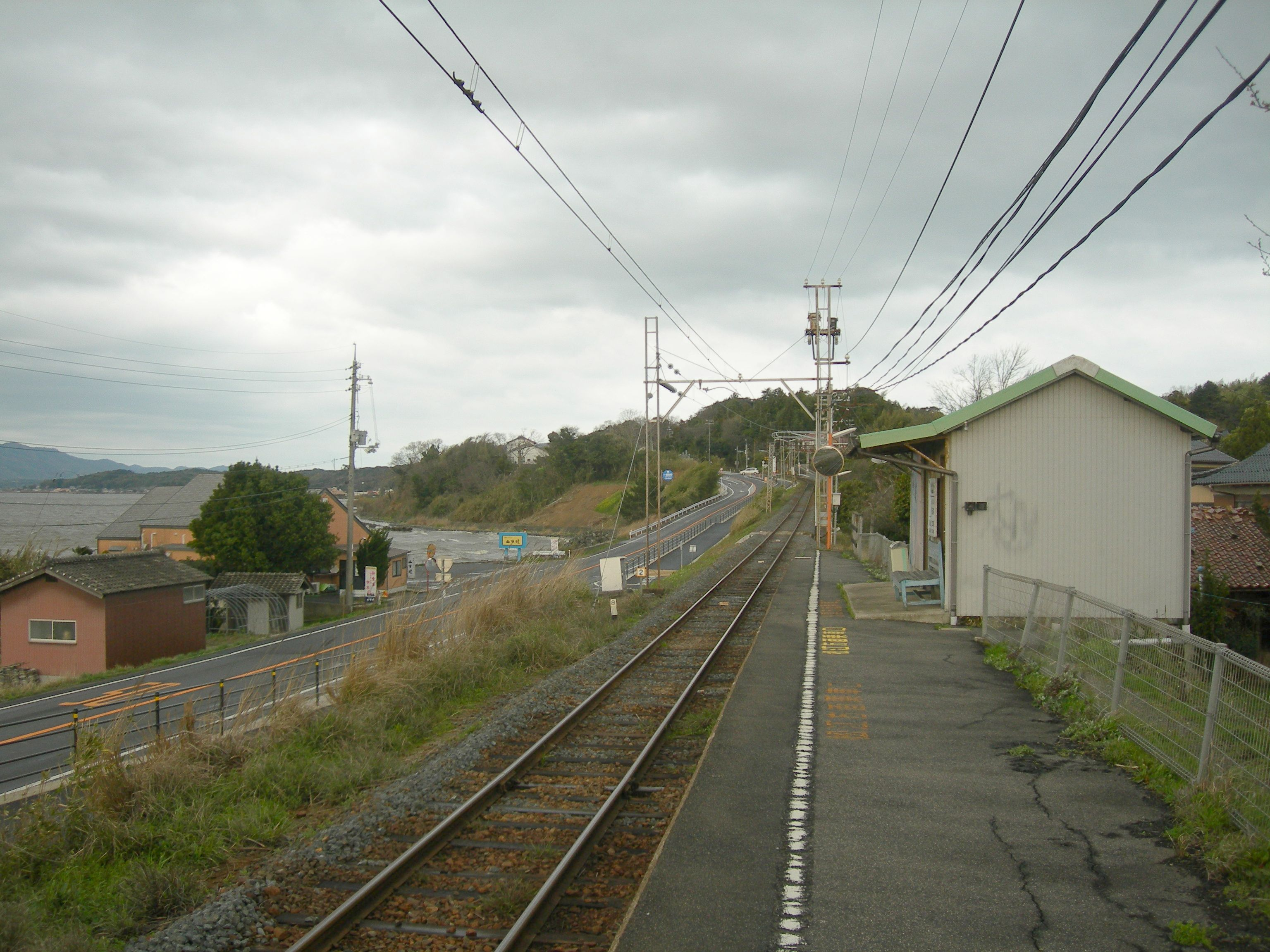
- Inonada Station, March 2009

General information
- Location: 523-4 Yoshino-cho, Izumo-shi, Shimane-ken 691-0073; Japan
- Coordinates: 35°27′40.52″N 132°54′3.25″E
- Operator: Ichibata Electric Railway
- Line: ■ Kita-Matsue Line
- Distance: 194 km (121 miles) from Dentetsu-Izumoshi
- Platforms: 1 side platform
- Tracks: 1

Construction
- Structure type: at grade

Other information
- Status: Unstaffed
- Station code: 14
- Website: Official website

History
- Opened: 5 April 11928

Passengers
- FY 2019: 56 (daily)
Location
- Location within Shimane Prefecture Location within Japan

Inonada Station (伊野灘駅, Inonada-eki) is a passenger railway station located in the city of Izumo, Shimane Prefecture, Japan. It is operated by the private transportation company, Ichibata Electric Railway. The station was one of the main filming locations for the 2010 movie Railways.

== Lines ==
Inonada Station is served by the Kita-Matsue Line, and is located 19.4 kilometers from the terminus of the line at Dentetsu-Izumoshi. Only local trains stop at this station.

== Station layout ==
The station consists of one side platform serving a single bi-directional track. There is no station building, but only a shelter on the platform. The station is unattended.

== Adjacent stations ==
«	Service	»
Ichibata Electric Railway
Kita-Matsue Line
Limited Express Superliner: Does not stop at this station
Express Izumotaisha: Does not stop at this station
Express: Does not stop at this station
Ichibataguchi	Local	Tsunomori

== History ==
Inonada Station was opened on 5 April 1928.

== Passenger statistics ==
In 2019, the station was used by an average of 56 passengers daily.

== Surrounding area ==
- Lake Shinji
- Japan National Route 431

== See also ==
- List of railway stations in Japan
