= Ichibataguchi Station =

Railway station in Izumo, Shimane Prefecture, Japan

Ichibataguchi Station 一畑口駅
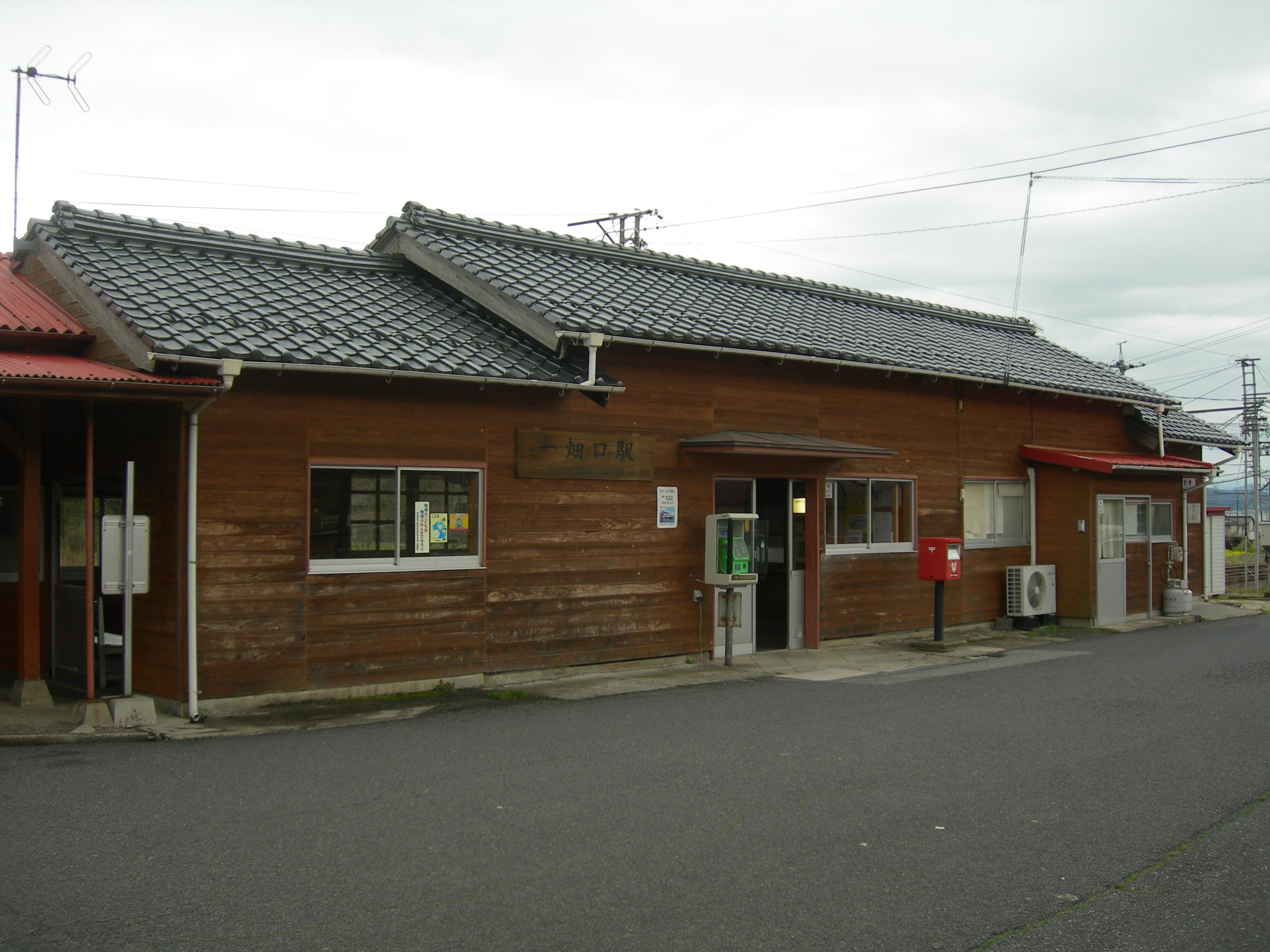
- Ichibataguchi Station, March 2009

General information
- Location: 379-3Kozakai-cho, Izumo-shi, Shimane-ken 691-0074; Japan
- Coordinates: 35°27′52.33″N 132°52′58.23″E
- Operator: Ichibata Electric Railway
- Line: ■ Kita-Matsue Line
- Distance: 17.5 km (10.9 miles) from Dentetsu-Izumoshi
- Platforms: 1 side + 1 island platform
- Tracks: 3

Construction
- Structure type: at grade

Other information
- Status: Unstaffed
- Station code: 13
- Website: Official website

History
- Opened: 4 February 1915
- Former names: Kozakainada (to 1944)

Passengers
- FY 2019: 103 daily
Location
- Location within Shimane Prefecture Location within Japan

Ichibataguchi Station (一畑口駅, Ichibataguchi-eki) is a passenger railway station located in the city of Izumo, Shimane Prefecture, Japan. It is operated by the private transportation company, Ichibata Electric Railway.

== Lines ==
Ichibataguchi Station is served by the Kita-Matsue Line, and is located 17.5 kilometers from the terminus of the line at Dentetsu-Izumoshi. Only local trains stop at this station. The Kita-Matsue Line previously extended northwards to Ichibata Yakushi. However, this section of rail was closed in 1944 and disassembled in 1960 due to it being designated as an "unnecessary railway", making this station a switchback.

== Station layout ==
The station consists of one side platform and one island platform connected by a level crossing. The station is unattended.

== Platforms ==
1	■ Taisha Line	for Matsue-Shinjiko-Onsen
2	■ Kita-Matsue Line	for Unshū-Hirata and Dentetsu-Izumoshi
3	■ Kita-Matsue Line	not normally in use

== Adjacent stations ==
«	Service	»
Ichibata Electric Railway
Kita-Matsue Line
Unshū-Hirata	Limited Express Superliner	Matsue-Shinjiko-Onsen
Nunozaki	Express Izumotaisha	Tsunomori
Nunozaki	Express	Tsunomori
Sono	Local	Inonada
Kita-Matsue Line (defunct)
Terminus	-	Ichibata

== History ==
Ichibataguchi Station was opened on 4 February 1915 as Kozakainada Station (小境灘). It was renamed 10 December 1944 to its present name.

== Passenger statistics ==
In fiscal 2019, the station was used by an average of 103 passengers daily.

== Surrounding area ==
- Lake Shinji
- Izumo City Higashi Elementary School
- Japan National Route 431

== See also ==
- List of railway stations in Japan
