= Nagae Station =

Railway station in Matsue, Shimane Prefecture, Japan

Nagae Station 長江駅
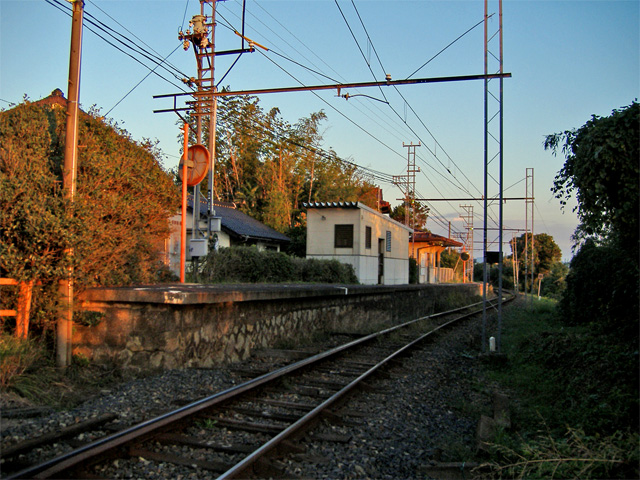
- Nagae Station, October 2007

General information
- Location: 45-11 Higashi Nagae-cho, Matsue-shi, Shimane-ken 690-0133; Japan
- Coordinates: 35°28′48.15″N 132°58′26.47″E
- Operator: Ichibata Electric Railway
- Line: ■ Kita-Matsue Line
- Distance: 26.7 km (16.6 miles) from Dentetsu-Izumoshi
- Platforms: 1 side platform
- Tracks: 1

Construction
- Structure type: at grade

Other information
- Status: Unstaffed
- Station code: 19
- Website: Official website

History
- Opened: 5 April 1928

Passengers
- FY 2019: 49 daily
Location
- Location within Shimane Prefecture Location within Japan

Nagae Station (長江駅, Nagae-eki) is a passenger railway station located in the city of Matsue, Shimane Prefecture, Japan. It is operated by the private transportation company, Ichibata Electric Railway.

== Lines ==
Nagae Station is served by the Kita-Matsue Line, and is located 26.7 kilometers from the terminus of the line at Dentetsu-Izumoshi. Only local services stop at this station.

== Station layout ==
The station consists of one side platform serving a single bi-directional track. The platform is on a sharp curve. The station is unattended.

== Adjacent stations ==
«	Service	»
Ichibata Electric Railway
Kita-Matsue Line
Limited Express Superliner: Does not stop at this station
Express Izumotaisha: Does not stop at this station
Express: Does not stop at this station
Aikamachi	Local	Asahigaoka

== History ==
Nagae Station was opened on 5 April 1928.

== Passenger statistics ==
In fiscal 2019, the station was used by an average of 49 passengers daily.

== Surrounding area ==
- Japan National Route 431
- Lake Shinji

== See also ==
- List of railway stations in Japan
