= Aikamachi Station =

Railway station in Matsue, Shimane Prefecture, Japan

Aikamachi Station 秋鹿町駅
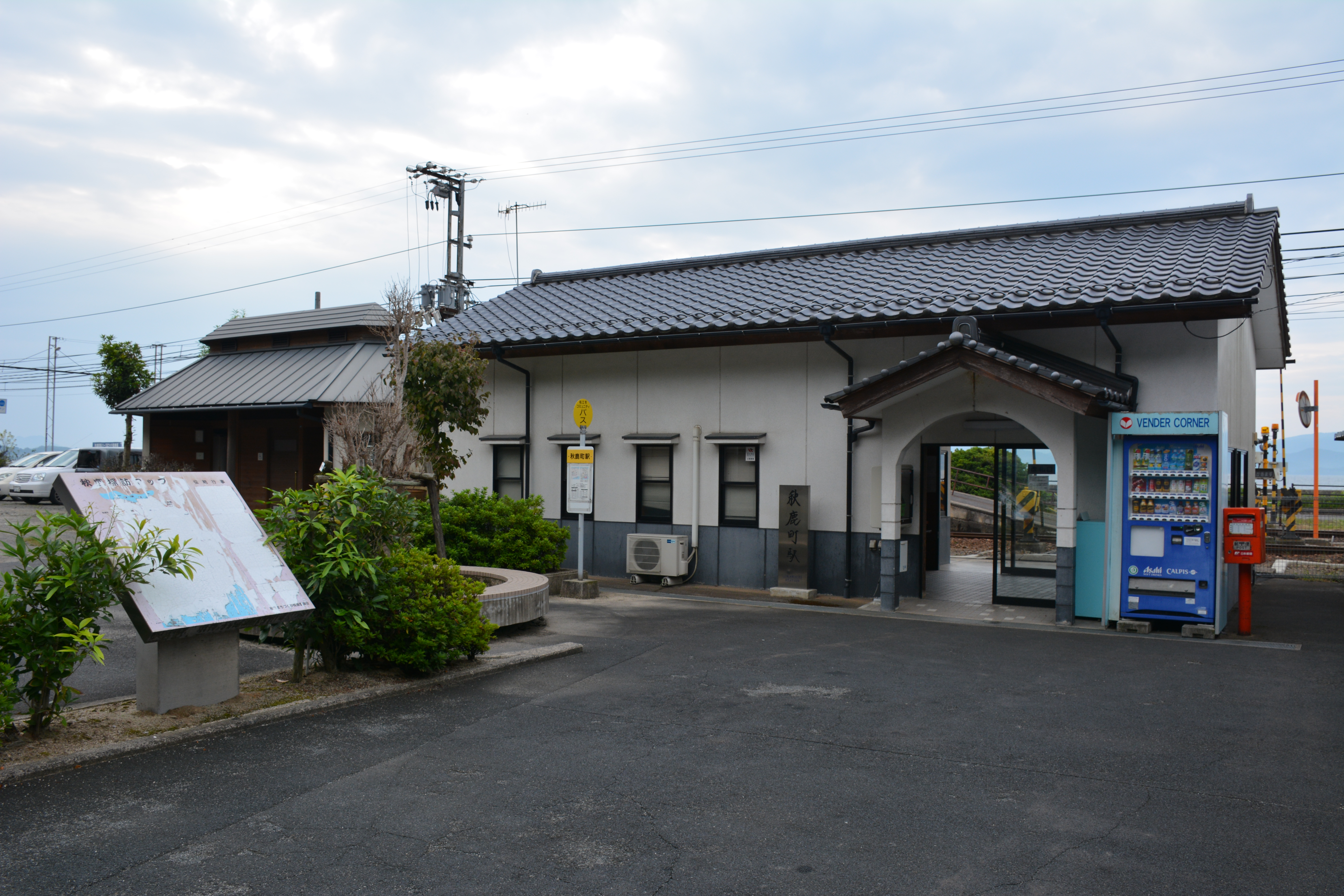
- Station entrance

General information
- Location: 3342-2 Aika-cho, Matsue-shi, Shimane-ken 690-0261; Japan
- Coordinates: 35°28′38.11″N 132°57′23.13″E
- Operator: Ichibata Electric Railway
- Line: ■ Kita-Matsue Line
- Distance: 25.0 km (15.5 miles) from Dentetsu-Izumoshi
- Platforms: 1 island platform
- Tracks: 2

Construction
- Structure type: at grade

Other information
- Status: Unstaffed
- Station code: 18
- Website: Official website

History
- Opened: 5 April 1928

Passengers
- FY 2019: 170 daily
Location
- Location within Shimane Prefecture Location within Japan

Aikamachi Station (秋鹿町駅, Aikamachi-eki) is a passenger railway station located in the city of Matsue, Shimane Prefecture, Japan. It is operated by the private transportation company, Ichibata Electric Railway.

== Lines ==
Aikamachi Station is served by the Kita-Matsue Line, and is located 25.0 kilometers from the terminus of the line at Dentetsu-Izumoshi. Local and express services stop at this station.

== Station layout ==
The station consists of one island platform connected by a level crossing the west side of the platform, which is also connected to the sidewalk along National Route 431. The station building was renovated in 1995, and its design resembles a sake brewery. The same design is also used at Tsunomori Station on the same line. The station is unattended.

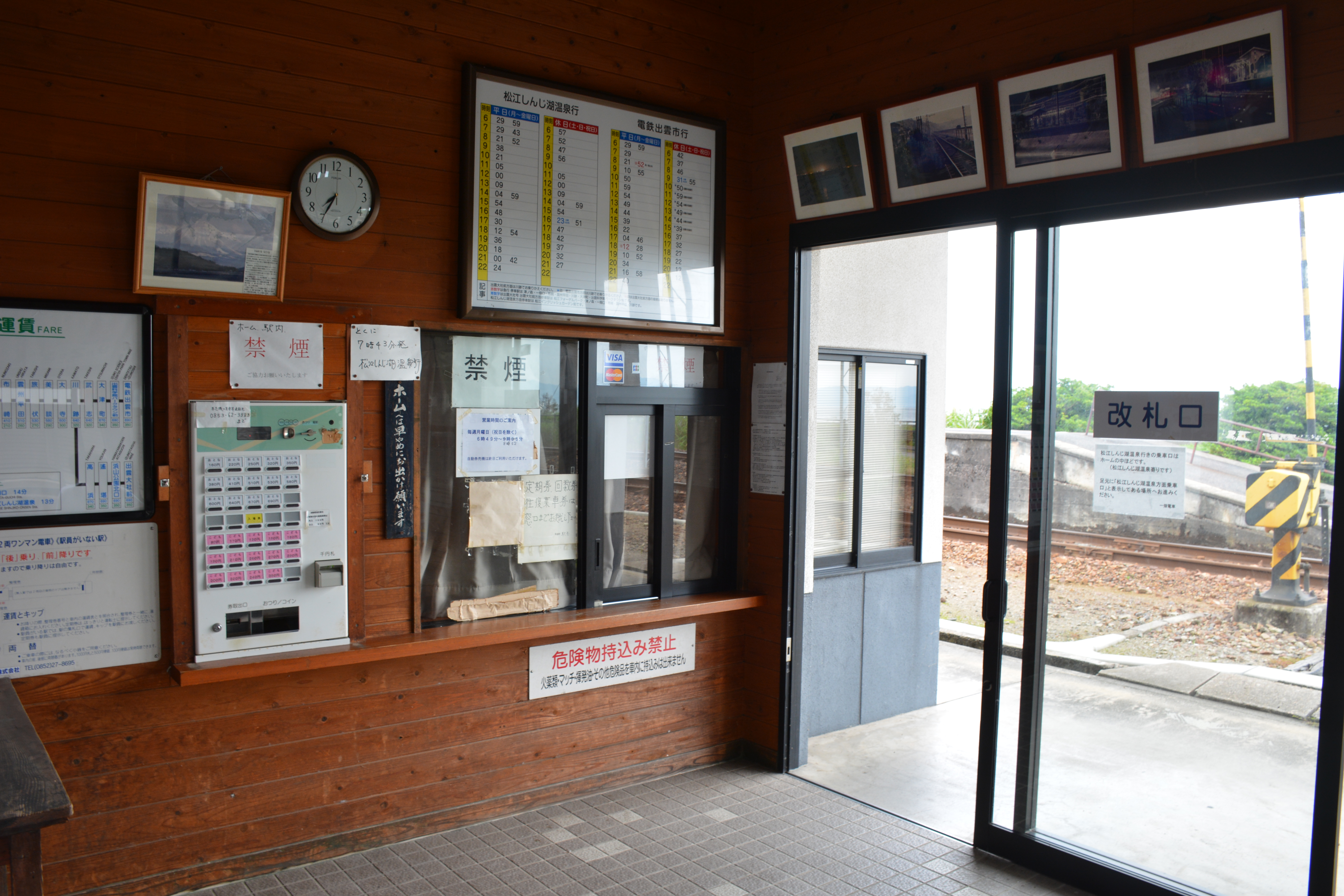
Wicket gate

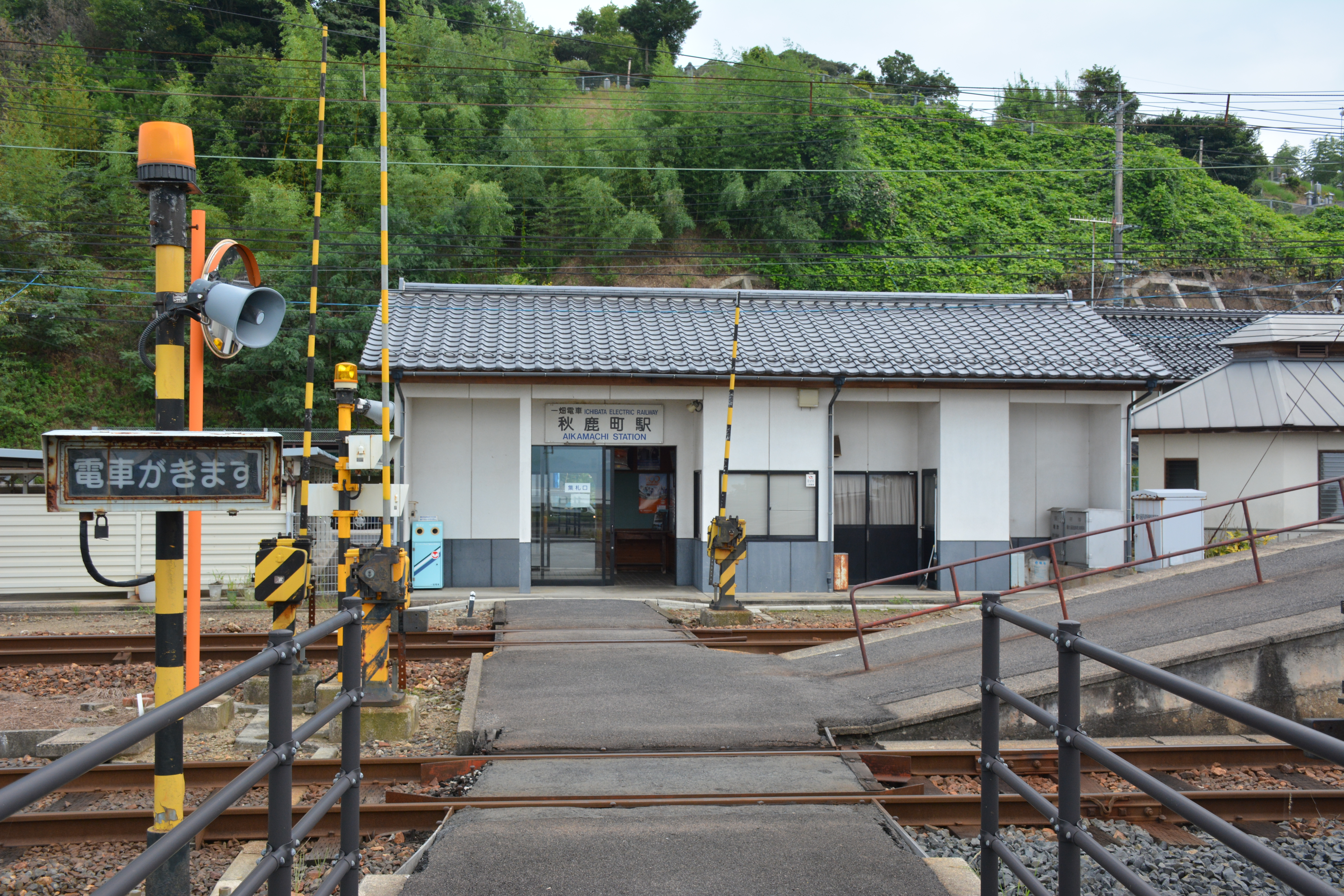
Exterior of station building showing level crossing

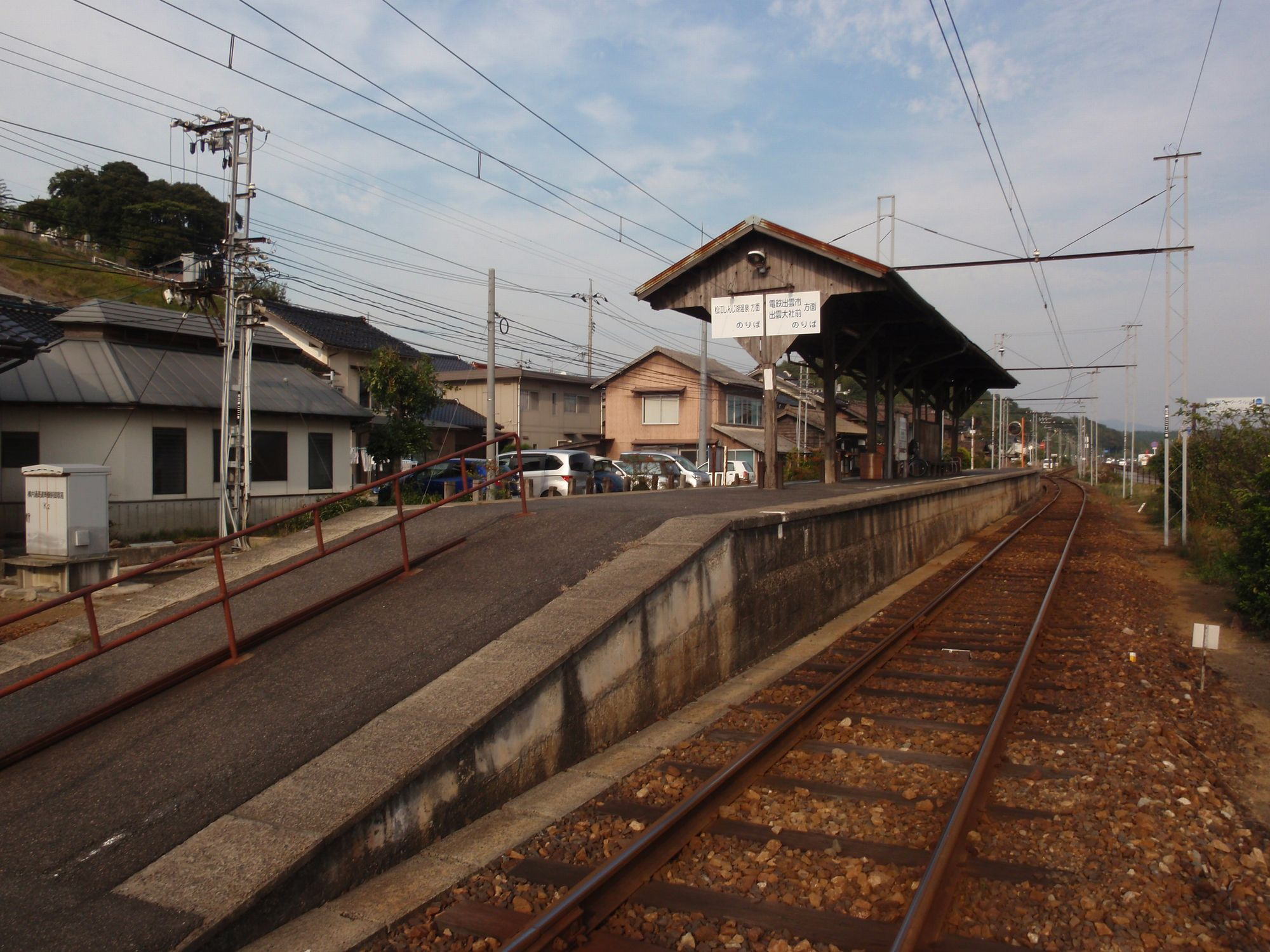
Platform

== Adjacent stations ==
«	Service	»
Ichibata Electric Railway
Kita-Matsue Line
Limited Express Superliner: Does not stop at this station
Matsue Vogel Park	Express Izumotaisha	Matsue English Garden Mae
Tsunomori	Express	Asahigaoka
Matsue Vogel Park	Local	Nagae

== History ==
Aikamachi Station was opened on 5 April 1928.

== Passenger statistics ==
In fiscal 2019, the station was used by an average of 170 passengers daily.

== Surrounding area ==
- Kannon-ji Temple
- Japan National Route 431
- Lake Shinji

== See also ==
- List of railway stations in Japan
