= Takeshi Station =

Railway station in Izumo, Shimane Prefecture, Japan

Takeshi Station 武志駅
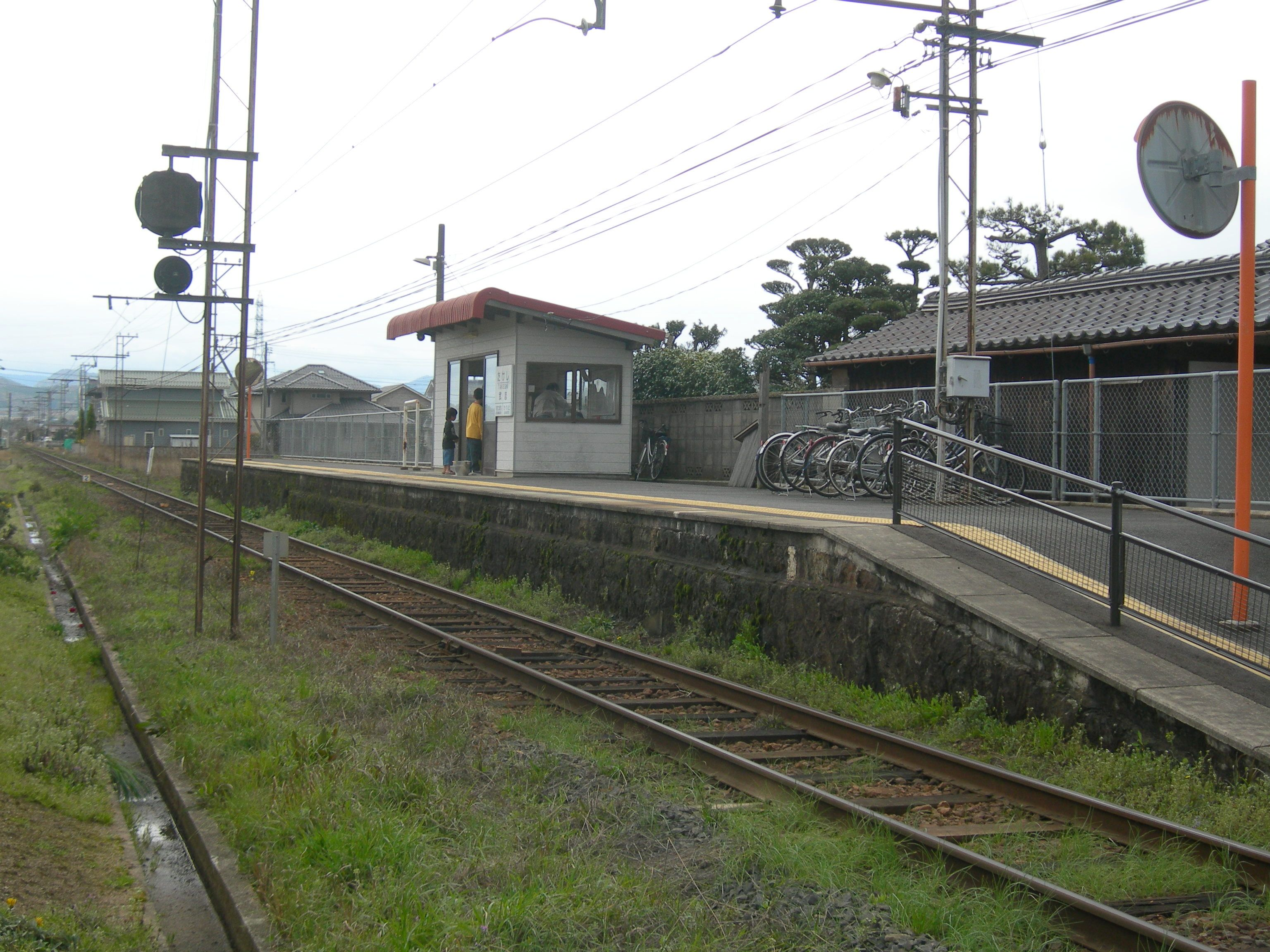
- Takeshi Station, 2009

General information
- Location: 42-2 Takeshi-cho, Izumo-shi, Shimane-ken 693-0014; Japan
- Coordinates: 35°23′17.82″N 132°46′23.55″E
- Operator: Ichibata Electric Railway
- Line: ■ Kita-Matsue Line
- Distance: 4.1 km (2.5 miles) from Dentetsu-Izumoshi
- Platforms: 1 side platforms
- Tracks: 1

Construction
- Structure type: at grade

Other information
- Status: Unstaffed
- Station code: 4
- Website: Official website

History
- Opened: 29 April 1914

Passengers
- FY 2019: 73 daily

Services
Preceding station	Ichibata Electric Railway	Following station
Ōtsumachi towards Dentetsu Izumoshi	Kita-Matsue Line Local	Kawato towards Matsue-Shinjiko-Onsen
Location
- Location within Shimane Prefecture Location within Japan

Takeshi Station (武志駅, Takeshi-eki) is a passenger railway station located in the city of Izumo, Shimane Prefecture, Japan. It is operated by the private transportation company, Ichibata Electric Railway. The station features in the 2010 movie Railways

== Lines ==
Takeshi Station is served by the Kita-Matsue Line, and is located 4.1 kilometers from the terminus of the line at Dentetsu-Izumoshi.

== Station layout ==
The station consists of one side platform serving a single bi-directional track. There is no station building, but only a shelter on the platform. The station is unattended.

== History ==
Takeshi Station was opened on 29 April 1914 with the opening of the Kita-Matsue line.

== Passenger statistics ==
In fiscal 2019, the station was used by an average of 73 passengers daily.

== Surrounding area ==
- Izumo City Hokuyo Elementary School

== See also ==
- List of railway stations in Japan
