= Asahigaoka Station (Shimane) =

Railway station in Matsue, Shimane Prefecture, Japan

Asahigaoka Station 朝日ヶ丘駅
- Asahigaoka Station, October 2007

General information
- Location: 1620-3 Kososhi-cho, Matsue-shi, Shimane-ken 690-0151; Japan
- Coordinates: 35°28′51.2″N 132°59′16.13″E
- Operator: Ichibata Electric Railway
- Line: ■ Kita-Matsue Line
- Distance: 28.0 km (17.4 miles) from Dentetsu-Izumoshi
- Platforms: 1 side platform
- Tracks: 1

Construction
- Structure type: at grade

Other information
- Status: Unstaffed
- Station code: 20
- Website: Official website

History
- Opened: 1 April 1988

Passengers
- FY 2019: 181 daily
Location
- Location within Shimane Prefecture Location within Japan

Asahigaoka Station (朝日ヶ丘駅, Asahigaoka-eki) is a passenger railway station located in the city of Matsue, Shimane Prefecture, Japan. It is operated by the private transportation company, Ichibata Electric Railway.

== Lines ==
Asahigaoka Station is served by the Kita-Matsue Line, and is located 28.0 kilometers from the terminus of the line at Dentetsu-Izumoshi. Local and express services stop at this station.

== Station layout ==
The station consists of one side platform serving a single bi-directional track. The station is unattended.

== Adjacent stations ==
| « | Service | » |
Ichibata Electric Railway
Kita-Matsue Line
Limited Express Superliner: Does not stop at this station
Express Izumotaisha: Does not stop at this station
| Aikamachi | Express | Matsue English Garden Mae |
| Nagae | Local | Matsue English Garden Mae |

== History ==
Asahigaoka Station was opened on 1 April 1988.

== Passenger statistics ==
In fiscal 2019, the station was used by an average of 181 passengers daily.

== Surrounding area ==
- Matsue City Kohoku Junior High School
- Asahigaoka Danchi
- Kofun no Oka Kososhi Park
- Japan National Route 431
- Lake Shinji

== See also ==
- List of railway stations in Japan
