= Sono Station =

Railway station in Izumo, Shimane Prefecture, Japan

Sono Station 園駅
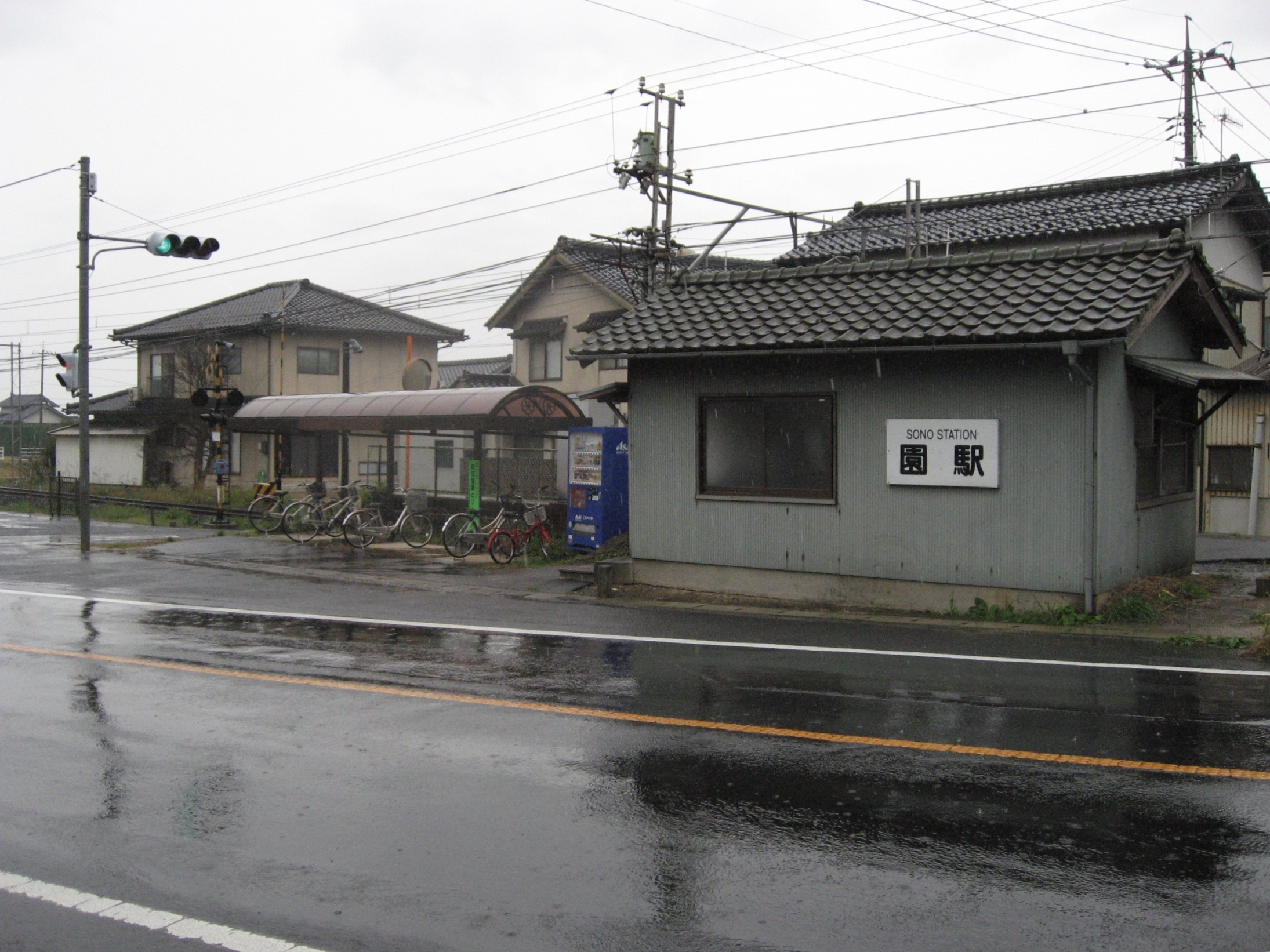
- Sono Station, November 2008

General information
- Location: 168-5 Sono-cho, Izumo-shi, Shimane-ken 691-0076; Japan
- Coordinates: 35°27′22.17″N 132°52′5.29″E
- Operator: Ichibata Electric Railway
- Line: ■ Kita-Matsue Line
- Distance: 15.9 km (9.9 miles) from Dentetsu-Izumoshi
- Platforms: 1 side platform
- Tracks: 1

Construction
- Structure type: at grade

Other information
- Status: Unstaffed
- Station code: 12
- Website: Official website

History
- Opened: 4 February 1915

Passengers
- FY 2019: 60 daily
Location
- Location within Shimane Prefecture Location within Japan

Sono Station (園駅, Sono-eki) is a passenger railway station located in the city of Izumo, Shimane Prefecture, Japan. It is operated by the private transportation company, Ichibata Electric Railway.

== Lines ==
Sono Station is served by the Kita-Matsue Line, and is located 15.9 kilometers from the terminus of the line at Dentetsu-Izumoshi. Only local trains stop at this station.

== Station layout ==
The station consists of one side platform serving a single bi-directional track. The station is unattended.

== Adjacent stations ==
«	Service	»
Ichibata Electric Railway
Kita-Matsue Line
Limited Express Superliner: Does not stop at this station
Express Izumotaisha: Does not stop at this station
Express: Does not stop at this station
Nunozaki	Local	Ichibataguchi

== History ==
Sono Station was opened on 4 February 1915.

== Passenger statistics ==
In fiscal 2019, the station was used by an average of 60 passengers daily.

== Surrounding area ==
- Lake Shinji
- Japan National Route 431

== See also ==
- List of railway stations in Japan
