= Ageshima Kofun =

- 上島古墳 (Japanese)
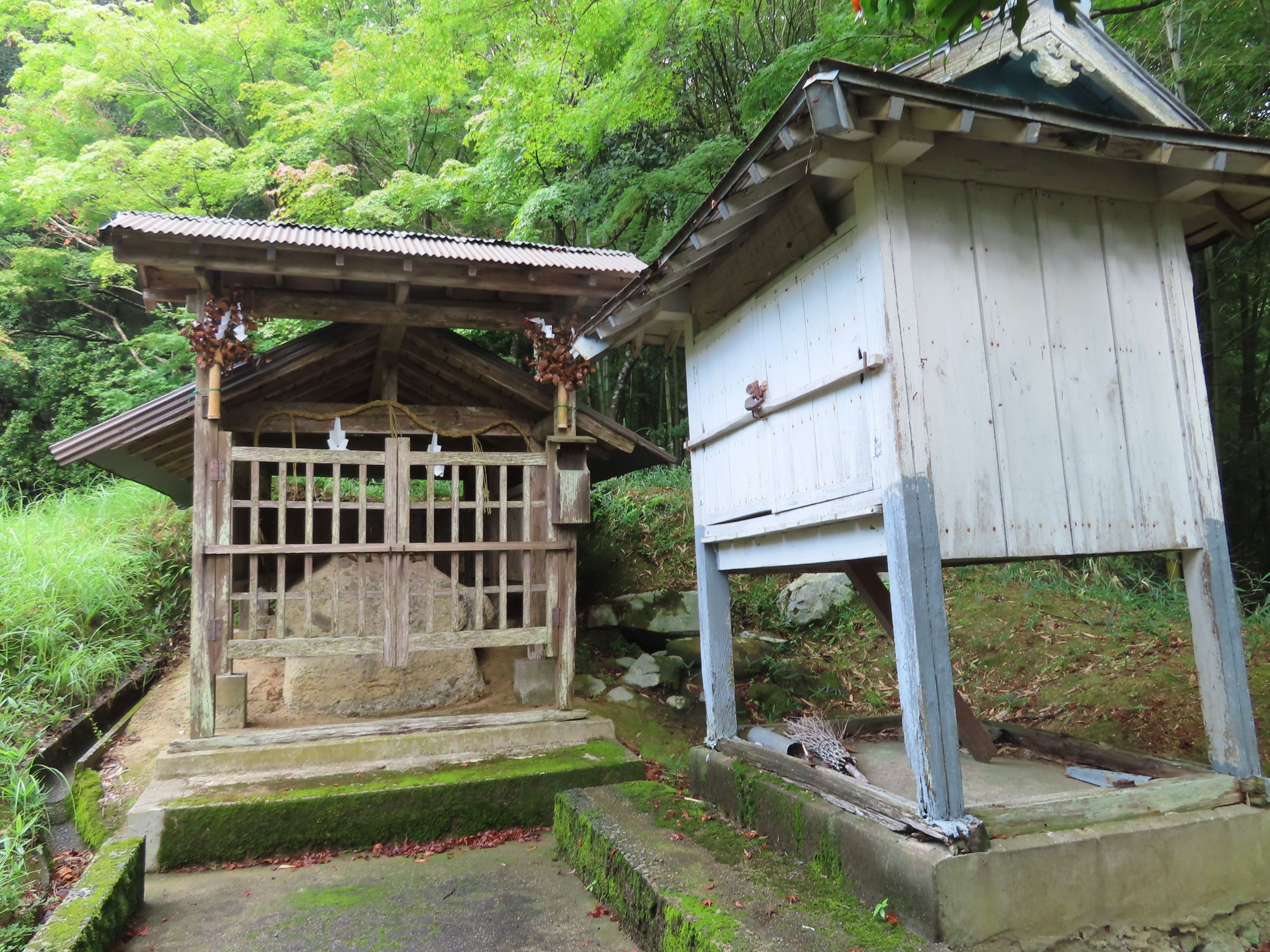
- Ageshima Kofun

- Ageshima Kofun Ageshima Kofun (Japan)
- 35°25′24″N 132°48′00″E
- Type: Kofun
- Periods: Kofun period
- Location: Izumo, Shimane, Japan
- Region: San'in region

History
- Built: c.6th century

Site notes
- Public access: Yes (no facilities)
- National Historic Site of Japan

The Ageshima Kofun (上島古墳) is a Kofun period burial mound in the Kunitomi-chō neighborhood of the city of Izumo, Shimane, San'in region, Japan. The tumulus was designated a National Historic Site of Japan in 1957. It is believed to have been built in the middle of the 6th century, towards the end of the Kofun period.

== Overview ==
Mount Kitayama is a massif that stretches from east to west on the north side of the Izumo Plain. At the western end of this massif is Hinomisaki Shrine, and at the eastern end is Mt. Tabushi, which is 462 meters above sea level. Many burial mounds are located at the eastern foot of Mt. Tabushi, including the Ageshima Kofun. The location overlooks Lake Shinji. This tumulus was discovered in 1949 during land clearance. It is a round enpun (円墳) style burial mound with a diameter of 15 meters and a height of two meters. No haniwa or fukiishi have been found on the surface of the mound. There are two burial chambers, one containing a house-shaped sarcophagus and the other a pit-style stone chamber.

The house-shaped sarcophagus is carved out of tuff, measuring 1.83 meters in length and 0.69 meters in width. In addition to human remains, a large quantity of grave goods was discovered. These included a "five-bell" bronze mirror, a silver ring, 184 beads (10 agate beads, 22 glass round beads, 152 small glass beads), six gilt-bronze guard band decorations, Sue ware pottery and an iron sword. However, many burial goods that were confirmed to exist at the time of the excavation and photographed in situ were subsequently lost and their current whereabouts is unknown. The surviving artifacts are kept at the Ageshima Kofun Hosankai, and some are on display at the Shimane Prefectural Museum of Ancient Izumo History.

The pit stone chamber was constructed from a combination of natural stone and split stone, and is 1.85 meters long, 0.6 to 0.7 meters wide and 0.7 meters high. No human remains were found, and the only grave goods was two complete sets of horse harnesses and fittings, along with 47 arrow heads, a bow fitting and a large amount of Sue ware pottery.

The tumulus is about 15 minutes on foot from Tabushi Station on the Ichibata Electric Railway Kita-Matsue Line.

== See also ==
- List of Historic Sites of Japan (Shimane)
