= Ōtera Station =

Railway station in Izumo, Shimane Prefecture, Japan

Ōtera Station 大寺駅
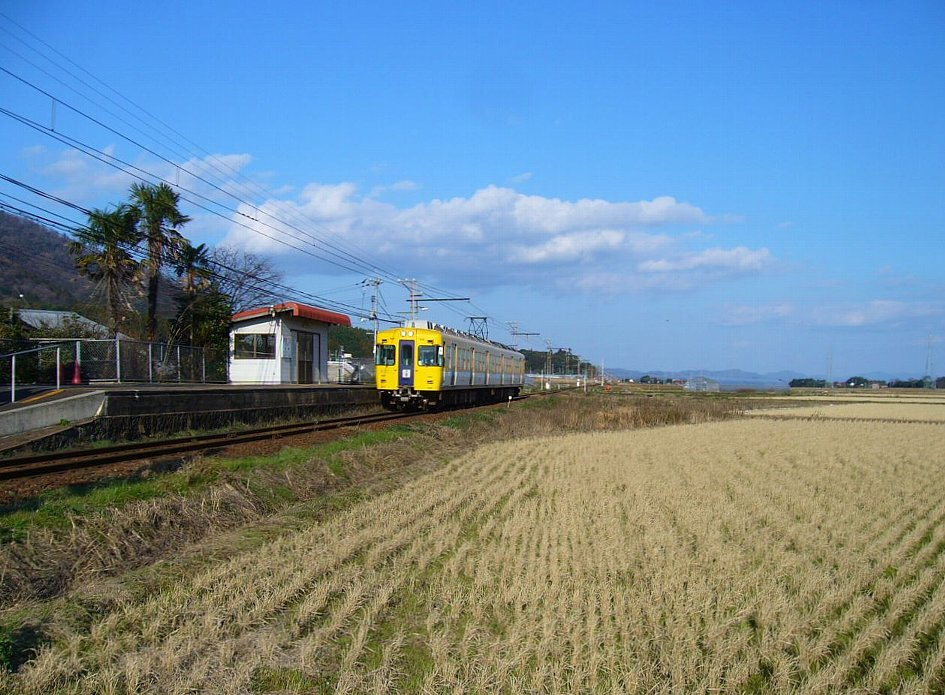
- Ōtera Station, January 2007

General information
- Location: Higashihayashigi-cho, Izumo-shi, Shimane-ken 693-0074; Japan
- Coordinates: 35°24′15.43″N 132°47′13.58″E
- Operator: Ichibata Electric Railway
- Line: ■ Kita-Matsue Line
- Distance: 6.4 km (4.0 miles) from Dentetsu-Izumoshi
- Platforms: 1 side platform
- Tracks: 1

Construction
- Structure type: at grade

Other information
- Status: Unstaffed
- Station code: 6
- Website: Official website

History
- Opened: 1 February 1931

Passengers
- FY 2019: 17 daily

Services
Preceding station	Ichibata Electric Railway	Following station
Kawato towards Dentetsu Izumoshi	Kita-Matsue Line Local	Midami towards Matsue-Shinjiko-Onsen
Location
- Location within Shimane Prefecture Location within Japan

Ōtera Station (大寺駅, Ōtera-eki) is a passenger railway station located in the city of Izumo, Shimane Prefecture, Japan. It is operated by the private transportation company, Ichibata Electric Railway.

== Lines ==
Ōtera Station is served by the Kita-Matsue Line, and is located 6.4 kilometers from the terminus of the line at Dentetsu-Izumoshi.

== Station layout ==
The station consists of one side platform serving a single bi-directional track. There is no station building, but only a shelter on the platform. The station is unattended.

== History ==
Ōtera Station was opened on1 February 1931.

== Passenger statistics ==
In fiscal 2019, the station was used by an average of 17 passengers daily.

== Surrounding area ==
- Ōtera Yakushi temple

== See also ==
- List of railway stations in Japan
