= Midami Station =

Railway station in Izumo, Shimane Prefecture, Japan

Midami Station 美談駅
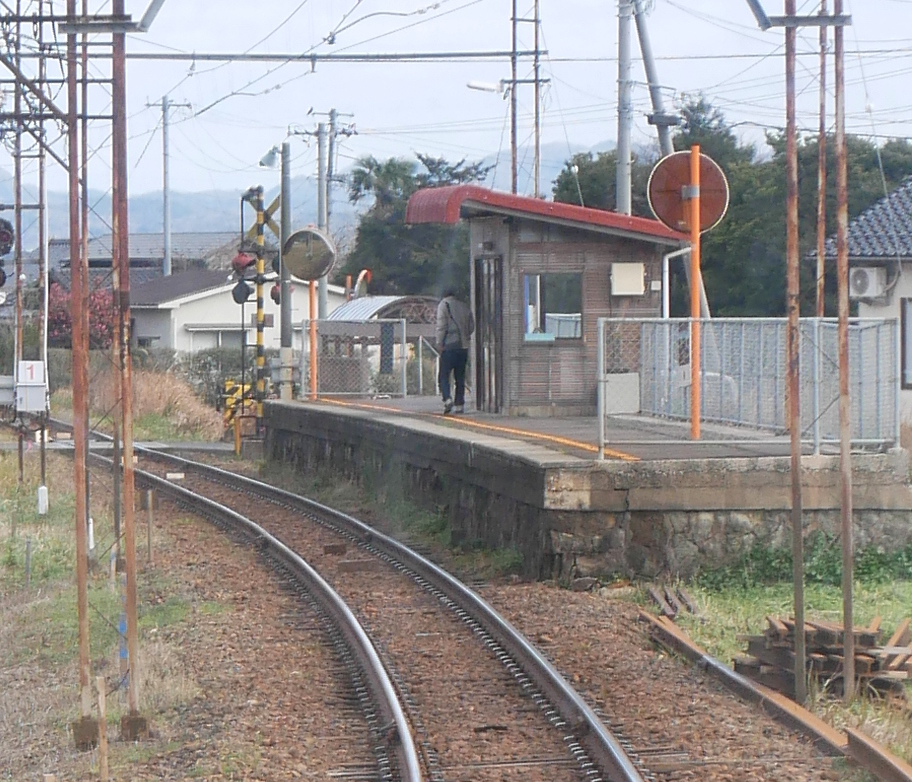
- Midami Station platform, 2019

General information
- Location: Midami-cho, Izumo-shi, Shimane-ken 691-0013; Japan
- Coordinates: 35°24′45.48″N 132°47′53.55″E
- Operator: Ichibata Electric Railway
- Line: ■ Kita-Matsue Line
- Distance: 7.7 km (4.8 miles) from Dentetsu-Izumoshi
- Platforms: 1 side platform
- Tracks: 1

Construction
- Structure type: at grade

Other information
- Status: Unstaffed
- Station code: 7
- Website: Official website

History
- Opened: 15 January 1952

Passengers
- FY 2019: 73 daily
Location
- Location within Shimane Prefecture Location within Japan

Midami Station (美談駅, Midami--eki) is a passenger railway station located in the city of Izumo, Shimane Prefecture, Japan. It is operated by the private transportation company, Ichibata Electric Railway.

== Lines ==
Midami Station is served by the Kita-Matsue Line, and is located 7.7 kilometers from the terminus of the line at Dentetsu-Izumoshi. Only local services stop at this station.

== Station layout ==
The station consists of one side platform serving a single bi-directional track. There is no station building, but only a shelter on the platform. The station is unattended.

== Adjacent stations ==
«	Service	»
Ichibata Electric Railway
Kita-Matsue Line
Limited Express Superliner: Does not stop at this station
Express Izumotaisha: Does not stop at this station
Express: Does not stop at this station
Ōtera	Local	Tabushi

== History ==
Midami Station was opened on 15 January 1952.

== Passenger statistics ==
In fiscal 2019, the station was used by an average of 34 passengers daily.

== Surrounding area ==
- Hii River
- Japan National Route 431

== See also ==
- List of railway stations in Japan
