= Ōtsumachi Station =

Railway station in Izumo, Shimane Prefecture, Japan

Ōtsumachi Station 大津町駅
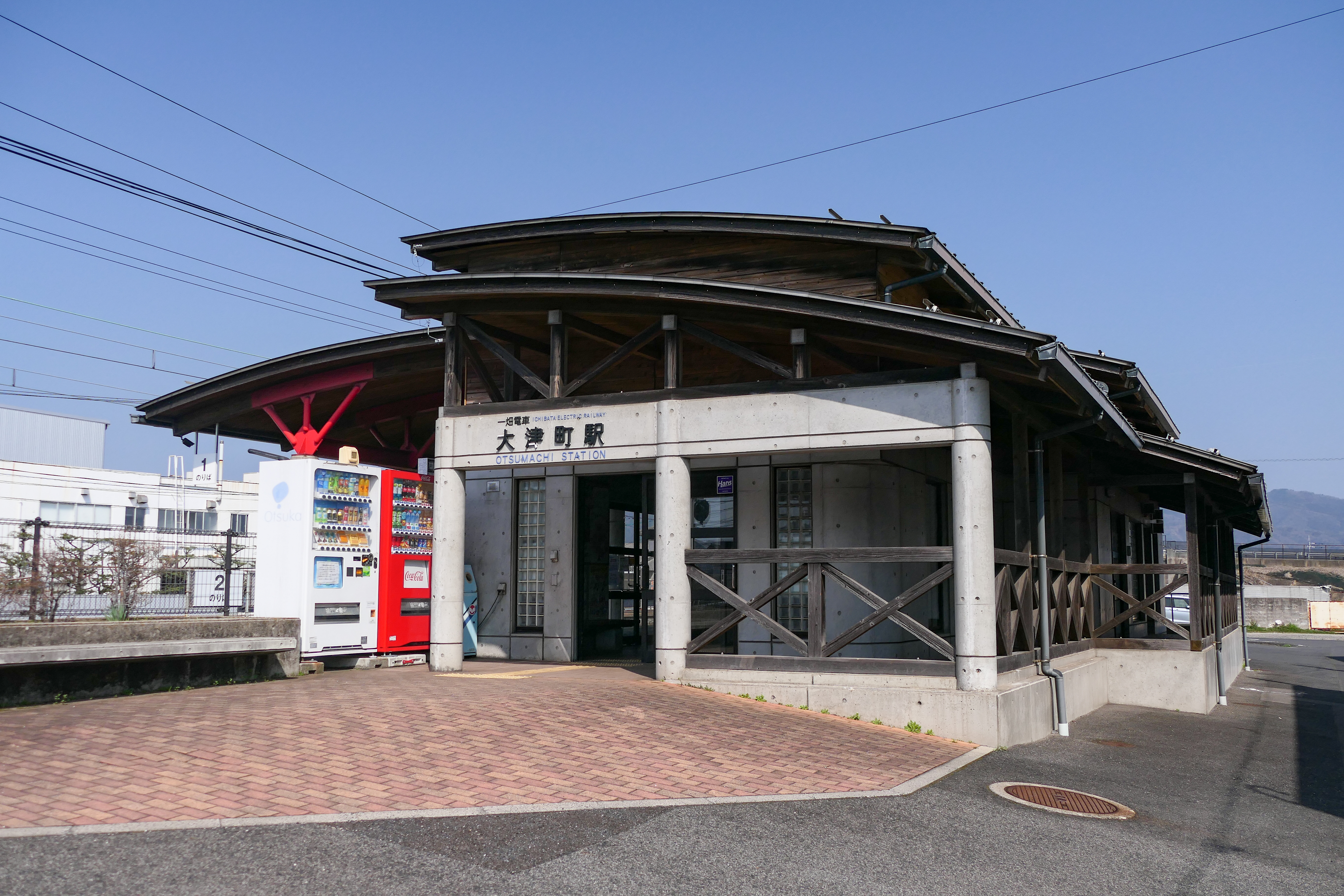
- Ōtsumachi Station, 2024

General information
- Location: 1398-6 Ōtsucho, Izumo-shi, Shimane-ken 693-0011; Japan
- Coordinates: 35°22′9.04″N 132°46′28.1″E
- Operator: Ichibata Electric Railway
- Line: ■ Kita-Matsue Line
- Distance: 2.0 km (1.2 miles) from Dentetsu-Izumoshi
- Platforms: 2 side platforms
- Tracks: 2

Construction
- Structure type: at grade

Other information
- Status: Unstaffed
- Station code: 3
- Website: Official website

History
- Opened: 29 April 1914

Passengers
- FY 2019: 397 daily

Services
Preceding station	Ichibata Electric Railway	Following station
Dentetsu Izumoshi Terminus	Kita-Matsue Line Superliner Limited Express	Kawato towards Matsue-Shinjiko-Onsen
Izumo Science Center Park Town Mae towards Dentetsu Izumoshi	Kita-Matsue Line Express	Kawato towards Matsue-Shinjiko-Onsen
Izumo Science Center Park Town Mae towards Dentetsu Izumoshi	Kita-Matsue Line Local	Takeshi towards Matsue-Shinjiko-Onsen
Location
- Location within Shimane Prefecture Location within Japan

Ōtsumachi Station (大津町駅, Ōtsumachi-eki) is a passenger railway station located in the city of Izumo, Shimane Prefecture, Japan. It is operated by the private transportation company, Ichibata Electric Railway. The station features in the 2010 movie Railways.

== Lines ==
Ōtsumachi Station is served by the Kita-Matsue Line, and is located 2.0 kilometers from the terminus of the line at Dentetsu-Izumoshi.

== Station layout ==
The station consists of two opposed side platforms connected by a level crossing. A wooden station building was once built, but it was demolished due to its age, and a new station building was completed in 2003. The station is unattended.

== History ==
Ōtsumachi Station was opened on 29 April 1914 with the opening of the Kita-Matsue line.

== Passenger statistics ==
In fiscal 2019, the station was used by an average of 397 passengers daily.

== Surrounding area ==
- Izumo City Otsu Elementary School
- Shimane Prefectural Izumo Commercial High School
- Isao Hirano Memorial Museum

== See also ==
- List of railway stations in Japan
