= Izumo Science Center =

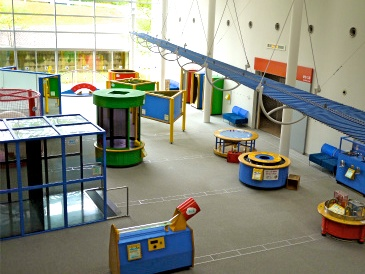
- Established: July 20, 2002
- Location: 1900-2 Imaichi-cho, Izumo-shi, Shimane-ken
- Coordinates: 35.3619°N 132.7661°E
- Type: Science education, experiment, handicraft, woodwork
- Website: Izumo Science Center

The Izumo Science Center (出雲科学館, Izumo Kagakukan) is a science center located in Izumo-shi, Shimane Prefecture, Japan that operates both as a school and as a center for public education. The pupils in Izumo-shi, from third grade through junior high school, take lessons in natural science. On weekends, the center hosts events about science and manufacturing for the general public. About 150,000 people, as many as the population of Izumo-shi, visit there every year.

The Izumo Science Center Park Town Mae Station, on the Kita-Matsue Line, serves the museum.

== Facilities ==
=== Main building ===
The main building was built to take advantage of green energy systems, such as photovoltaics and rainwater harvesting. In the Experience Exhibition Plaza, there are hands-on science exhibits that can be touched and moved around. The Latest Information Corner contains information about scientific developments in the 21st century. The Information Station has movies and books about science, and computers that can be used to learn about subjects such as weather. The Science Hall primarily holds large-scale equipment and is used for lectures and science shows. Laboratories and practice rooms provide space for science and manufacturing activities. In the Creation Workshop, there are facilities for woodwork and metalwork, used for groups such as the Boys and Girls Invention Club. The Planetarium has 15 programs, such as animations of the night sky.

- Planetarium (15 programs such as "Tonight stars" or animations)

== Related items ==
- Izumo-shi
