= Tabushi Station =

Railway station in Izumo, Shimane Prefecture, Japan

Tabushi Station 旅伏駅
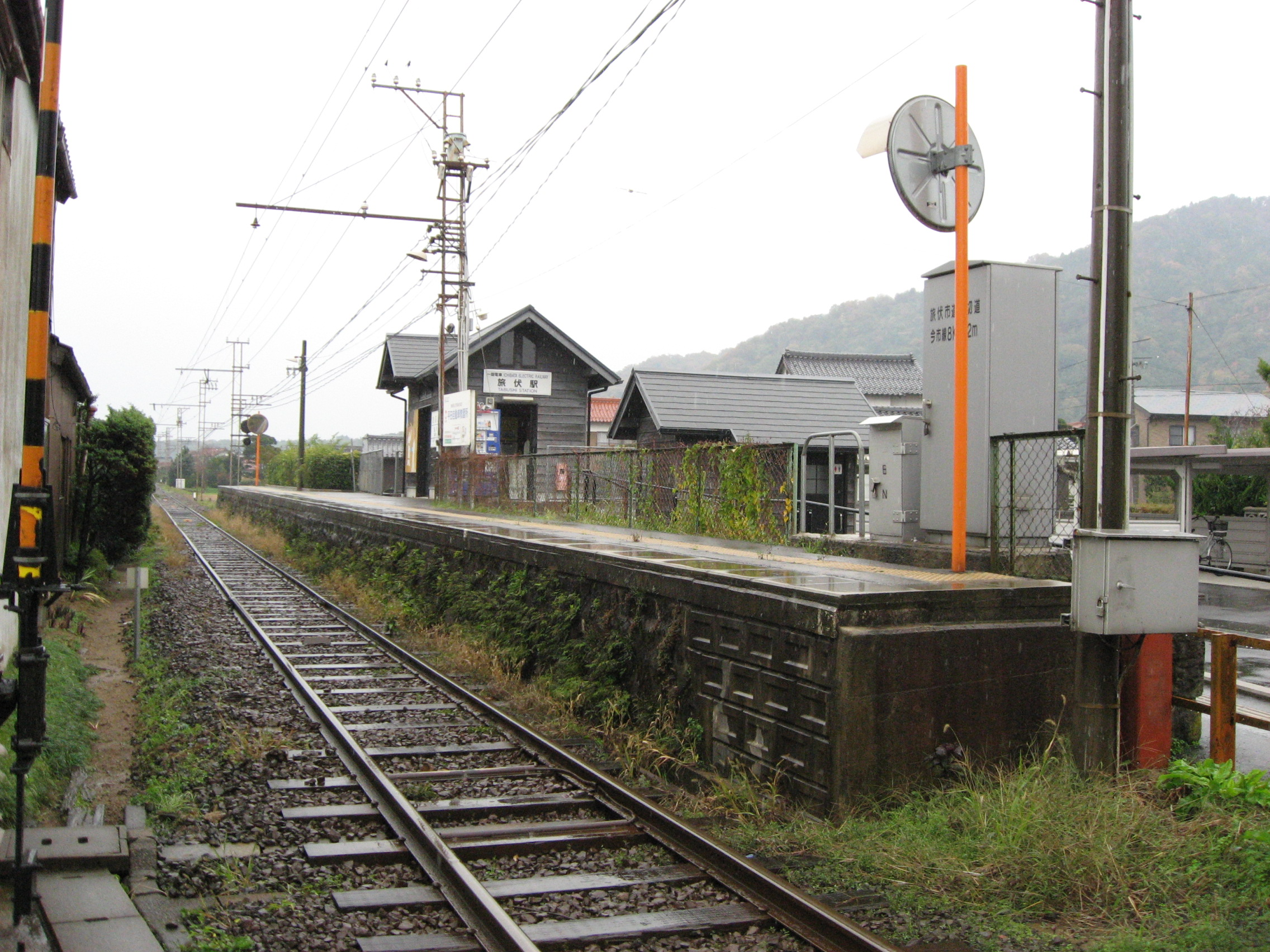
- Tabushi Station, October 2008

General information
- Location: Nishidaicho, Izumo-shi, Shimane-ken 691-0012; Japan
- Coordinates: 35°25′16.72″N 132°48′24.87″E
- Operator: Ichibata Electric Railway
- Line: ■ Kita-Matsue Line
- Distance: 9.0 km (5.6 miles) from Dentetsu-Izumoshi
- Platforms: 1 side platform
- Tracks: 1

Construction
- Structure type: at grade

Other information
- Status: Unstaffed
- Station code: 8
- Website: Official website

History
- Opened: 29 April 1914

Passengers
- FY 2019: 144 daily
Location
- Location within Shimane Prefecture Location within Japan

Tabushi Station (旅伏駅, Tabushi-eki) is a passenger railway station located in the city of Izumo, Shimane Prefecture, Japan. It is operated by the private transportation company, Ichibata Electric Railway.

== Lines ==
Tabushi Station is served by the Kita-Matsue Line, and is located 9.0 kilometers from the terminus of the line at Dentetsu-Izumoshi. Only local trains stop at this station.

== Station layout ==
The station consists of one side platform serving a single bi-directional track. There is no station building, but only a shelter on the platform. The station is unattended.

== Adjacent stations ==
«	Service	»
Ichibata Electric Railway
Kita-Matsue Line
Limited Express Superliner: Does not stop at this station
Express Izumotaisha: Does not stop at this station
Express: Does not stop at this station
Midami	Local	Unshū-Hirata

== History ==
Tabushi Station was opened on 29 April 1914 with the opening of the Kita-Matsue line.

== Passenger statistics ==
In fiscal 2019, the station was used by an average of 144 passengers daily.

== Surrounding area ==
- Izumo City Kunitomi Elementary School
- Ageshima Kofun

== See also ==
- List of railway stations in Japan
