= Unshū-Hirata Station =

Railway station in Izumo, Shimane Prefecture, Japan

Unshū-Hirata Station 雲州平田駅
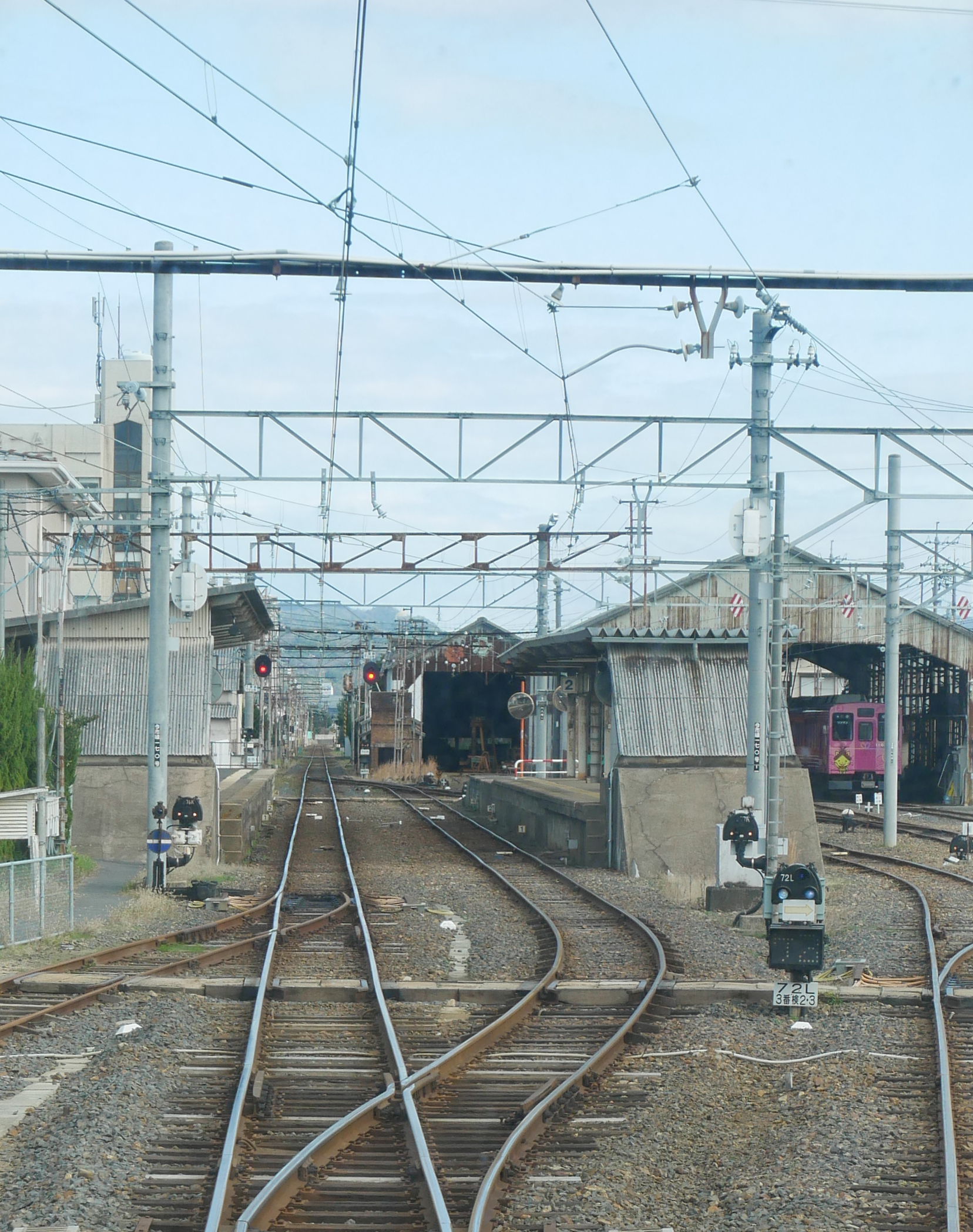
- Station platforms, 2019

General information
- Location: 2226 Hirata-cho, Izumo-shi, Shimane-ken 691-0001; Japan
- Coordinates: 35°25′56.31″N 132°49′25.12″E
- Operator: Ichibata Electric Railway
- Line: ■ Kita-Matsue Line
- Distance: 10.9 km (6.8 miles) from Dentetsu-Izumoshi
- Platforms: 1 side + 1 island platform
- Tracks: 3

Construction
- Structure type: at grade

Other information
- Status: Staffed
- Station code: 9
- Website: Official website

History
- Opened: 29 April 1914
- Former names: Hirata (1970-2005)

Passengers
- FY 2019: 1184 daily
Location
- Location within Shimane Prefecture Location within Japan

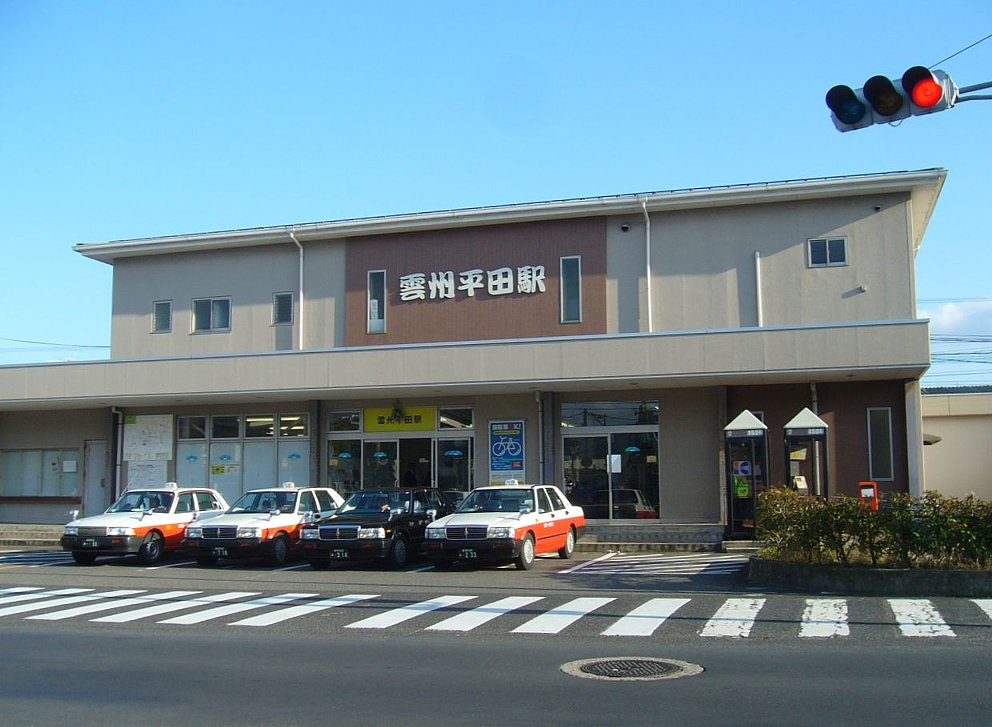
Unshū-Hirata Station, 2007

Unshū-Hirata Station (雲州平田駅, Unshū-Hirata-eki) is a passenger railway station located in the city of Izumo, Shimane Prefecture, Japan. It is operated by the private transportation company, Ichibata Electric Railway. It is located adjacent to the main depot and railyard for the Ichibata Electric Railway.

== Lines ==
Unshū-Hirata Station is served by the Kita-Matsue Line, and is located 10.9 kilometers from the terminus of the line at Dentetsu-Izumoshi. All services stop at this station.

== Station layout ==
The station consists of one side platform and one island platform connected by a level crossing; however, normally all trains use the side platform (Platform 1), which is adjacent to the station building. The station is staffed.

== Adjacent stations ==
«	Service	»
Ichibata Electric Railway
Kita-Matsue Line
Kawato	Limited Express Superliner	Ichibataguchi
Kawato	Express Izumotaisha	Nunozaki
Kawato	Express	Nunozaki
Tabushi	Local	Nunozaki

== History ==
Unshū-Hirata Station was opened on 29 April 1914 with the opening of the Kita-Matsue line. The station name was changed on 1 October 1970 to Hirata Station (平田駅, Hirata-eki), but reverted to its original name on 22 March 2005.

== Passenger statistics ==
In fiscal 2019, the station was used by an average of 1184 passengers daily.

== Surrounding area ==
- Izumo City Hall Hirata Administration Center (formerly Hirata City Hall)
- Izumo City Hirata Elementary School
- Izumo City General Medical Center

== See also ==
- List of railway stations in Japan
