= Izumo Science Center Park Town Mae Station =

Railway station in Izumo, Shimane Prefecture, Japan

Izumo Science Center Park Town Mae Station 出雲科学館パークタウン前駅
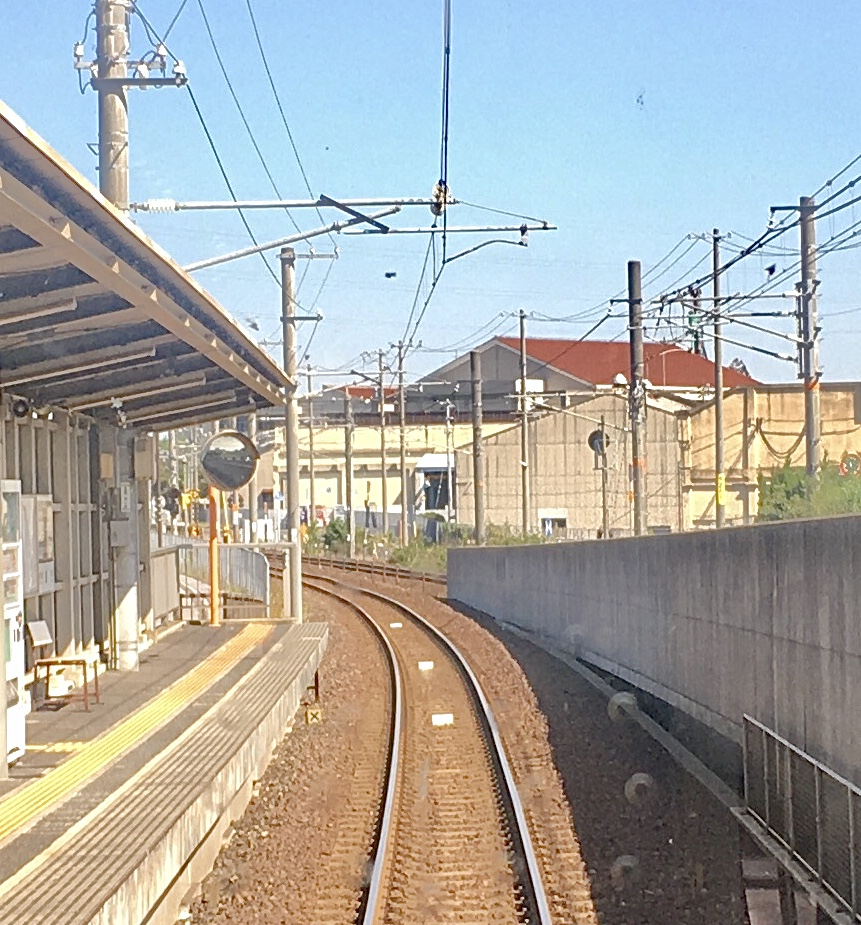
- Station platform, 2022

General information
- Location: Imaichicho, Izumo-shi, Shimane-ken 693-0001; Japan
- Coordinates: 35°21′46.29″N 132°45′58.08″E
- Operator: Ichibata Electric Railway
- Line: ■ Kita-Matsue Line
- Distance: 0.8 km (0.50 miles) from Dentetsu-Izumoshi
- Platforms: 1 side platform
- Tracks: 1

Construction
- Structure type: Elevated

Other information
- Status: Unstaffed
- Station code: 2
- Website: Official website

History
- Opened: 15 September 1928
- Former names: Imaichi-Kamimachi (to 1941); Daiwabo-mae (to 2002)

Passengers
- FY 2019: 43 daily

Services
Preceding station	Ichibata Electric Railway	Following station
Dentetsu Izumoshi Terminus	Kita-Matsue Line Express Local	Ōtsumachi towards Matsue-Shinjiko-Onsen
Location
- Location within Shimane Prefecture Location within Japan

Izumo Science Center Park Town Mae Station (出雲科学館パークタウン前駅, Izumo-Kagakukan-Pākutaun-mae-eki) is a passenger railway station located in the city of Izumo, Shimane Prefecture, Japan. It is operated by the private transportation company, Ichibata Electric Railway.

== Lines ==
Izumo Science Center Park Town Mae Station is served by the Kita-Matsue Line, and is located 0.8 kilometers from the terminus of the line at Dentetsu-Izumoshi.

== Station layout ==
The station consists of one semi-elevated side platform serving a single bi-directional track. There is no station building and the station is unattended.

== History ==
Izumo Science Center Park Town Mae Station was opened on 15 September 1928 as Imaichi-Kamimachi Station (今市上町駅). Around 1941, it was renamed Daiwabo-mae Station (大和紡前駅) after a nearby textile mill. It was renamed to its present name form 20 July 2002.

== Passenger statistics ==
In fiscal 2019, the station was used by an average of 43 passengers daily.

== Surrounding area ==
- Izumo Science Center
- Daiwabo (Daiwabo Izumo Factory)
- Izumo City Daiichi Junior High School
- Shimane Prefectural Izumo High School
- Imaichi Dainenji Kofun

== See also ==
- List of railway stations in Japan
