= Japan National Route 430 =

Road in Okayama prefecture, Japan

National Route 430
- 国道430号
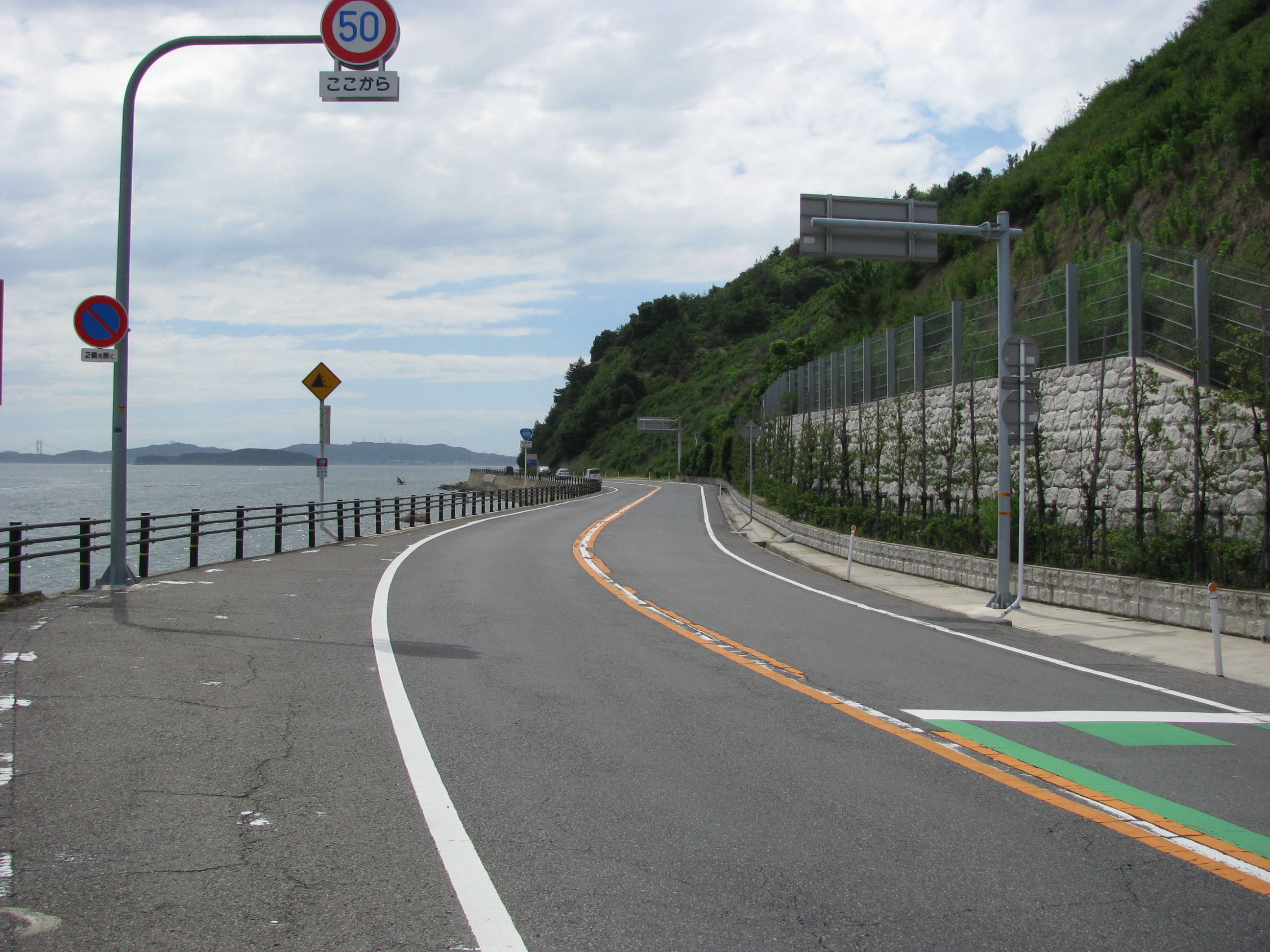

Route information
- Length: 38.9 km (24.2 mi)

Location
- Country: Japan

Highway system
- National highways of Japan; Expressways of Japan
← National Route 429	→ National Route 431

National Route 430 is a national highway of Japan connecting Kurashiki, Okayama and Tamano, Okayama in Japan, with a total length of 38.9 km (24.17 mi).
