= Kita-Matsue Line =

Railway line in Izumo, Shimane

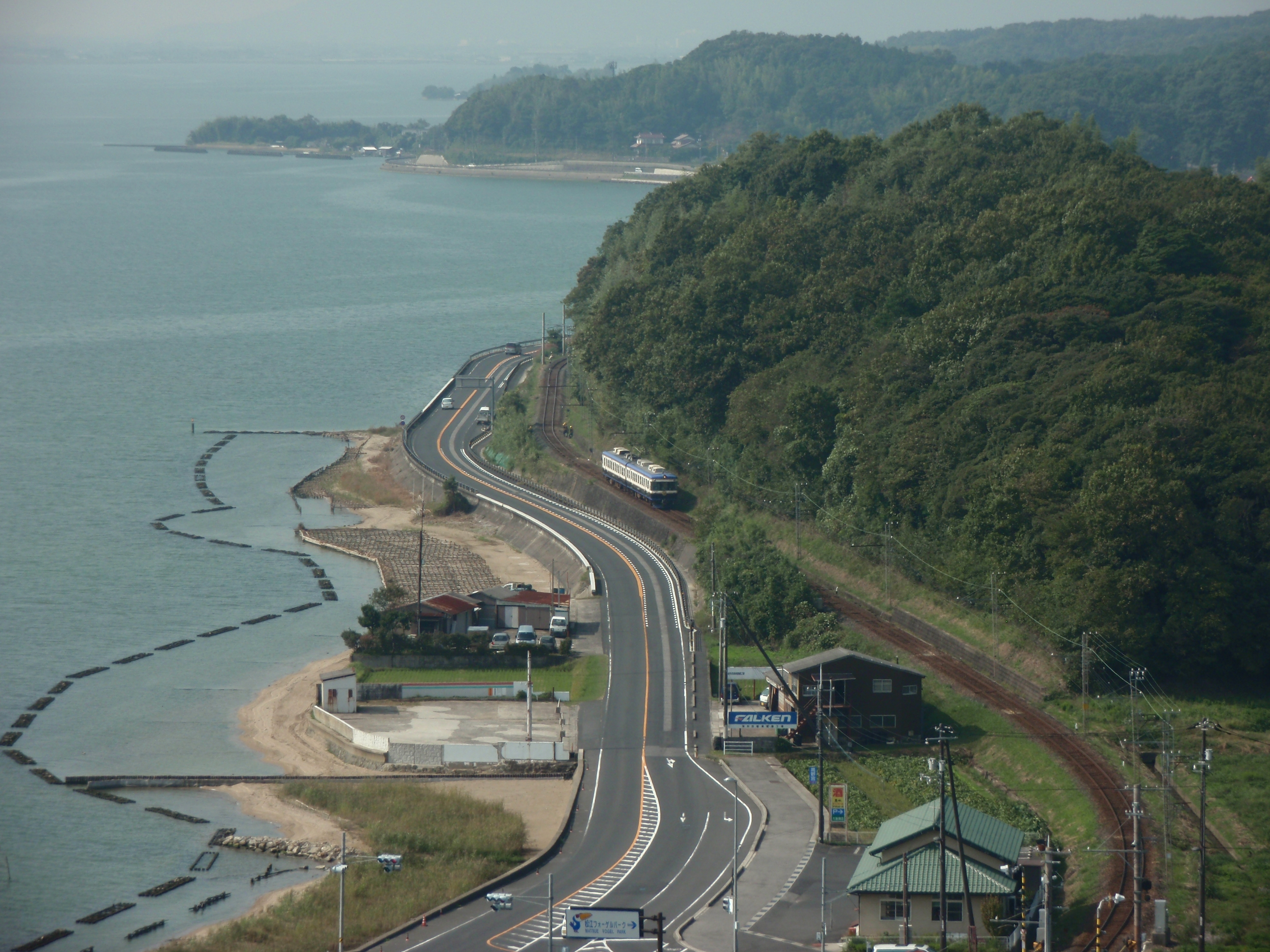
- A 5000-series passenger train on the Kita-Matsue Line along Lake Shinji

Overview
- Native name: 北松江線
- Owner: Ichibata Electric Railway
- Locale: Shimane Prefecture
- Termini: Dentetsu-Izumoshi; Matsue-Shinjiko-Onsen
- Stations: 22
- Website: http://www.ichibata.co.jp

Service
- Type: Heavy rail

History
- Opened: 29 April 1914; 112 years ago

Technical
- Line length: 33.9 km (21.1 mi)
- Track gauge: 1,067 mm (3 ft 6 in)
- Electrification: Overhead line, DC 1,500 V
- Operating speed: 85 km/h (53 mph)
Route map

The Kita-Matsue Line (北松江線, Kita-matsue-sen) is a 22.9 km railway line owned by the Ichibata Electric Railway. The line connects Dentetsu-Izumoshi Station in Izumo with Matsue-Shinjiko-Onsen Station in Matsue, all within Shimane Prefecture, Japan. Tracks run parallel to JR West's San'in Main Line on the north of Lake Shinji.

== History ==
The line was first built to transport worshippers between Izumo and Ichibata Yakushi, a shrine to the east of the city. An extension to Matsue was completed in 1928. Before World War II, the line connected directly to Ichibata Yakushi, where a station named Ichibata Station was located nearby. However, during the war, the line was designated as an "unnecessary line", and in 1944 the section between Ichibata and Ichibataguchi Station was closed. This section would later be disassembled in 1960 and parts were offered to the Nagoya Railroad. Because of this, there is still a switchback at Ichibataguchi Station.

Centralized traffic control was introduced to the line in 1966.

== Operations ==
The line is electrified with overhead lines and is single-tracked for the entire line.

Some services branch off the line at Kawato Station and continue along the Taisha Line to Izumo Taisha-mae Station. There are local, express, and limited express services that run along on the line, along with the Izumotaisha express service and the Superliner limited express.

== Stations ==
All stations are within Shimane Prefecture.

Code	Name		Distance (km)	Connections	Location
1	Dentetsu-Izumoshi	電鉄出雲市	0.0	JR West: San'in Main Line (via Izumoshi Station)	Izumo
2	Izumo Science Center; Park Town Mae Station	出雲科学館 パークタウン前	0.8		Izumo
3	Ōtsumachi	大津町駅	2.0		Izumo
4	Takeshi	武志	4.1		Izumo
5	Kawato	川跡	4.9	Taisha Line	Izumo
6	Ōtera	大寺	6.4		Izumo
7	Midami	美談	7.7		Izumo
8	Tabushi	旅伏	9.0		Izumo
9	Unshū-Hirata	雲州平田	10.9		Izumo
10	Nunozaki	布崎	14.5		Izumo
11	Koyūkan-Shineki	湖遊館新駅	15.2		Izumo
12	Sono	園	15.9		Izumo
13	Ichibataguchi	一畑口	17.5		Izumo
14	Inonada	伊野灘	19.4		Izumo
15	Tsunomori	津ノ森	21.2		Matsue
16	Takanomiya	高ノ宮駅	22.5		Matsue
17	Matsue Vogel Park	松江フォーゲルパーク	23.8		Matsue
18	Aikamachi	秋鹿町	25.0		Matsue
19	Nagae	長江	26.7		Matsue
20	Asahigaoka	朝日ヶ丘	28.0		Matsue
21	Matsue English Garden Mae	松江イングリッシュ ガーデン前	29.6		Matsue
22	Matsue-Shinjiko-Onsen	松江しんじ湖温泉	33.9		Matsue
