= Social education in Japan =

Social education (shakaikyôiku 社会教育) is the Japanese word for nondegree-oriented education.

Modern Japan is unquestionably a society that values education highly (see Education in Japan). Diverse institutions, such as the miscellaneous schools, provide social education services. Large newspaper companies and local governments sponsor cultural centers that offer ongoing programs of informal education, and department stores organize curricula covering everything from cooking classes to music, English conversation (eikaiwa), and Japanese poetry.

"Lifelong learning," another term for social education, was also a key phrase in the education reforms of the late 1980s. The responsibility for social education is shared by all levels of government, but especially by local government. Local governments also are largely responsible for such public facilities as libraries and museums--basic resources in social education. The ministry of education is interested in increasing the use of public school facilities for lifelong learning activities, increasing the number of social education facilities, training staff, and disseminating information about lifelong learning opportunities.

The Japanese are voracious readers. Popular bookstores are full from the moment they open their doors each day with readers seeking books from a staggering range of foreign as well as Japanese titles. The top four national newspapers (Asahi Shimbun, Mainichi Shimbun, Yomiuri Shimbun, Nihon Keizai Shimbun) alone have a combined daily circulation (with two editions each day) of more than 35 million, and there are four daily English-language papers as well.
