= Railways (film) =

- Film poster advertising Railways in Japan
- Directed by: Yoshinari Nishikori
- Screenplay by: Yoshinari Nishikori; Brazily Anne Yamada; Hirotoshi Kobayashi
- Produced by: Shūji Abe; Masaki Koide; Kazuyoshi Ishida; Hiroaki Kitayama; Yushi Ueda
- Starring: Kiichi Nakai; Reiko Takashima; Takahiro Miura; Yuika Motokariya; Tomoko Naraoka
- Cinematography: Hiro'o Yanagida
- Edited by: Mototaka Kusakabe
- Music by: Ryuta Yoshimura
- Production companies: Robot Communications; Hakuhodo DY Media Partners; TV Asahi; Shogakukan; Nihonkai Telecasting; Eisei Gekijo; Keio Agency; Yomiuri Shimbun Company; Imagica
- Distributed by: Shochiku
- Release date: 29 May 2010 (Japan)
- Running time: 130 minutes
- Country: Japan
- Language: Japanese

Railways (Japanese: RAILWAYS 49歳で電車の運転士になった男の物語, Hepburn: Railways 49-sai de Densha no Untenshi ni Natta Otoko no Monogatari) is a Japanese drama film released on 29 May 2010. The film was produced by Shūji Abe, directed by Yoshinari Nishikōri, and stars Kiichi Nakai and Reiko Takashima. This is the first movie in the Railways trilogy of films.

== Plot ==
The movie tells the story of a 49-year-old office worker, who quits his job in Tokyo to become a train driver on the rural Ichibata Electric Railway in Shimane Prefecture.

== Cast ==
- Kiichi Nakai as Hajime Tsutsui
- Yuika Motokariya as Sachi, Hajime's daughter
- Reiko Takashima as Yukiko, Hajime's wife
- Tomoko Naraoka as Kinyo, Hajime's mother
- Takahiro Miura as Miyata Daigo
- Isao Hashizume as the Ichibata Railway chief
- Shiro Sano as the Ichibata Railway deputy
- Yoshiko Miyazaki as Moriyama, a nurse
- Kenichi Endō as Kawahira
- Ken Nakamoto as Nishida
- Masahiro Komoto as Fukushima, the chief instructor
- Tetsu Watanabe as Takahashi, a veteran train mechanic
- Kanta Ogata as Yabuuchi, the train driver trainer
- Masanori Ishii as Takubo, the railway controller
- Matsunosuke Shofukutei as Toyo, the gardener

== Film series overview ==
Railways stands as a prelude to the subsequent pair of films within this cinematic series:

=== Crossroads (2011) ===
Known as RAILWAYS 愛を伝えられない大人たちへ (Railways: Ai wo Tsutaerare Nai Otonatachi e) in Japanese and directed by Masatoshi Kurakata, this film focuses on Toru Takishima, a railway driver approaching his mandatory retirement at 59. When his wife Sawako decides to reenter the nursing profession, their relationship faces challenges and transformations.

=== Our Departures (2018) ===
Directed by Yasuhiro Yoshida and known as かぞくいろ―RAILWAYS わたしたちの出発― (Kazokuiro) in Japanese, this film follows Akira Okuzono (Kasumi Arimura) as she copes with the loss of her husband. Alongside her stepson Shunya, she relocates to her late husband's hometown and forms an unexpected family connection with her father-in-law, Setsuo (Jun Kunimura). Inspired by Setsuo's career as a railway driver and her late husband's dreams, Akira embarks on a new path by pursuing the same profession.
