= Matsue-Shinjiko-Onsen Station =

Railway station in Matsue, Shimane Prefecture, Japan

Matsue-Shinjiko Onsen Station 松江しんじ湖温泉駅
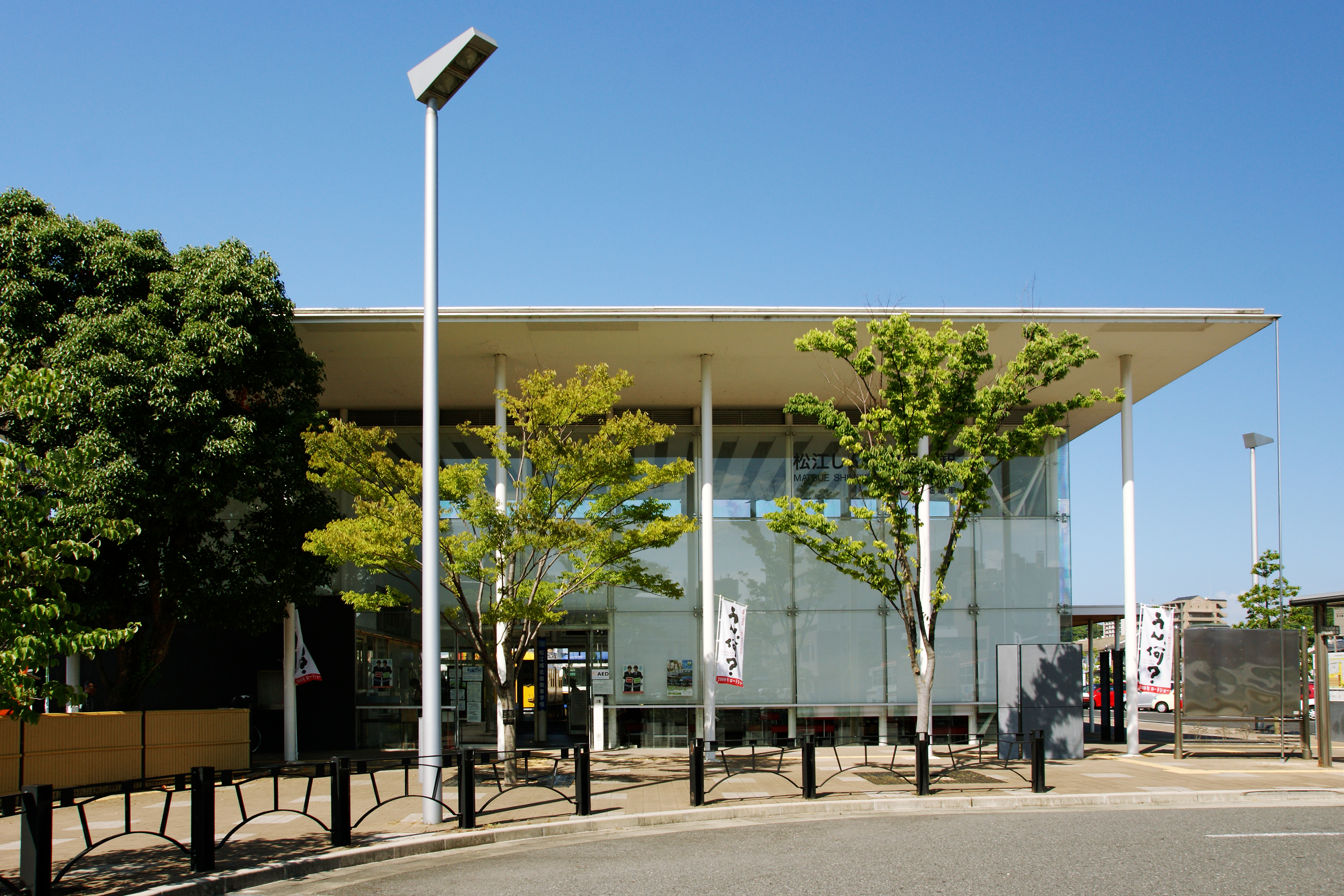
- Matsue-Shinjiko Onsen Station, July 2008

General information
- Location: 30-2 Nakabara-cho, Matsue-shi, Shimane-ken 690-0874; Japan
- Coordinates: 35°28′2.38″N 133°2′45.75″E
- Operator: Ichibata Electric Railway
- Line: ■ Kita-Matsue Line
- Distance: 33.9 km (21.1 miles) from Dentetsu-Izumoshi
- Platforms: 2 bay platforms
- Tracks: 2

Construction
- Structure type: at grade

Other information
- Status: Unstaffed
- Station code: 22
- Website: Official website

History
- Opened: 5 April 1928
- Former names: Kita-Matsue (to 1970); Matsue-Onsen (to 2002)

Passengers
- FY 2019: 1843 daily
Location
- Location within Shimane Prefecture Location within Japan

Matsue-Shinjiko Onsen Station (松江しんじ湖温泉駅, Matsue-Shinjiko-Onsen-eki) is a passenger railway station located in the city of Matsue, Shimane Prefecture, Japan. It is operated by the private transportation company, Ichibata Electric Railway.

== Lines ==
Matsue-Shinjiko Onsen Station is the terminus of the Kita-Matsue Line, and is located 33.9 kilometers from the opposing terminus of the line at Dentetsu-Izumoshi. Local and express services stop at this station.

== Station layout ==
The station consists of two bay platforms. The station is staffed.

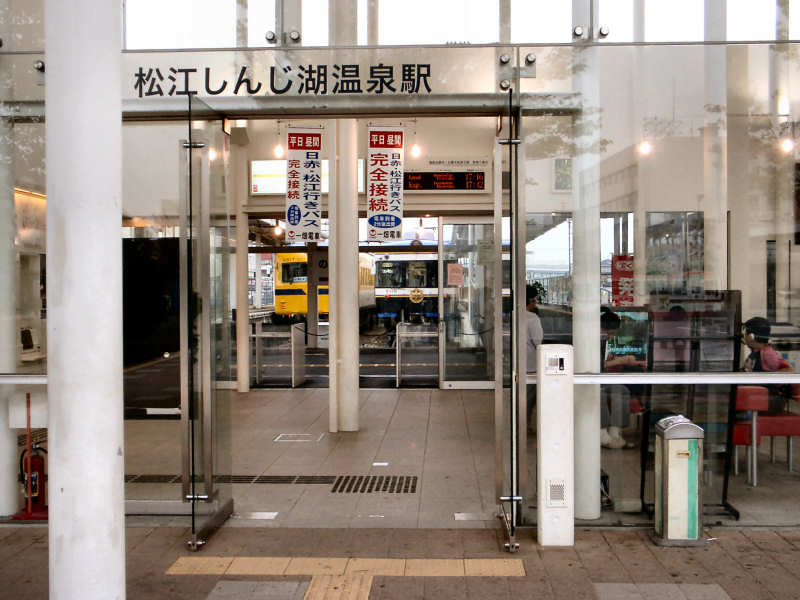
Entrance

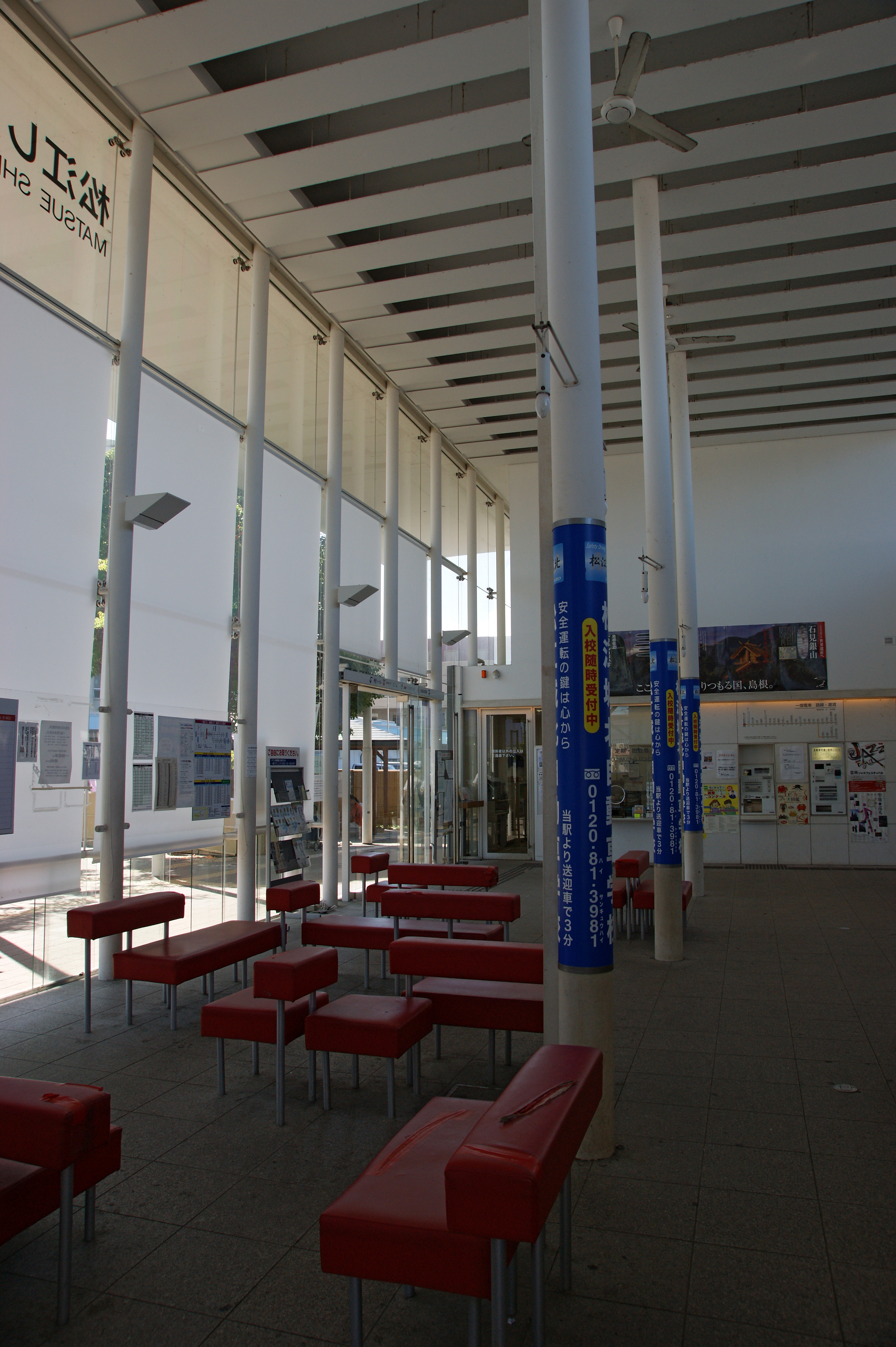
Inside the station building

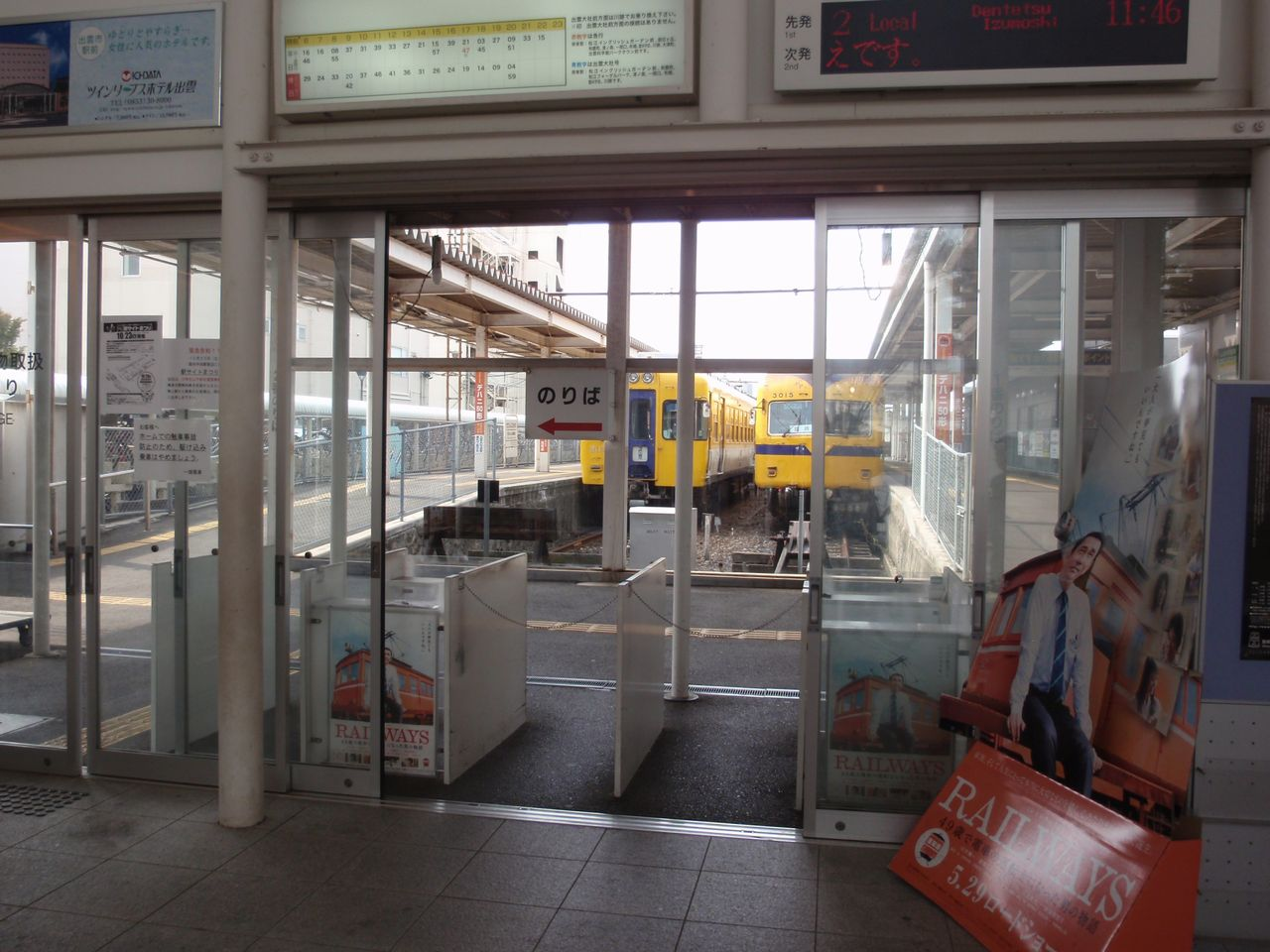
Wicket gates

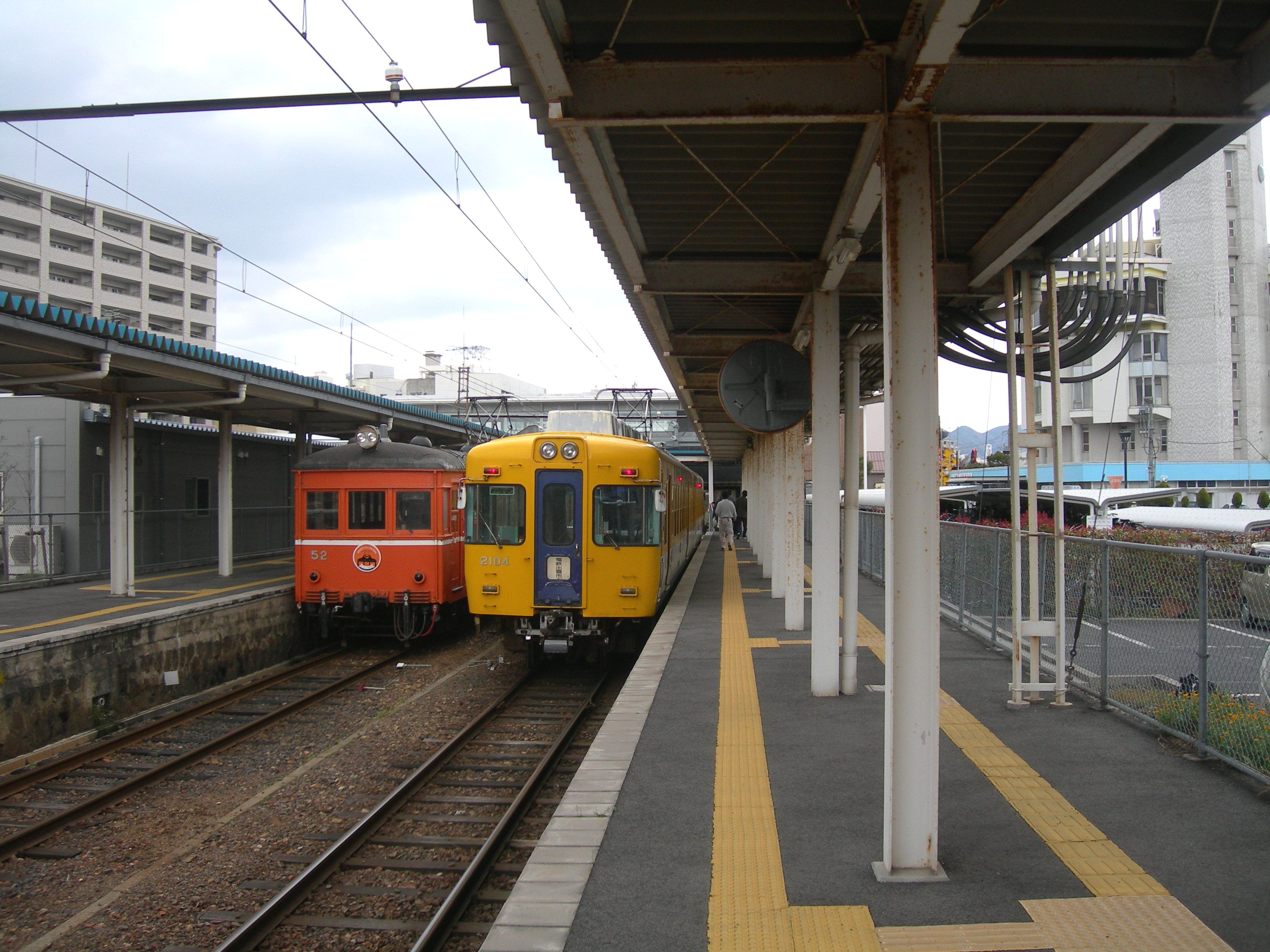
Platform

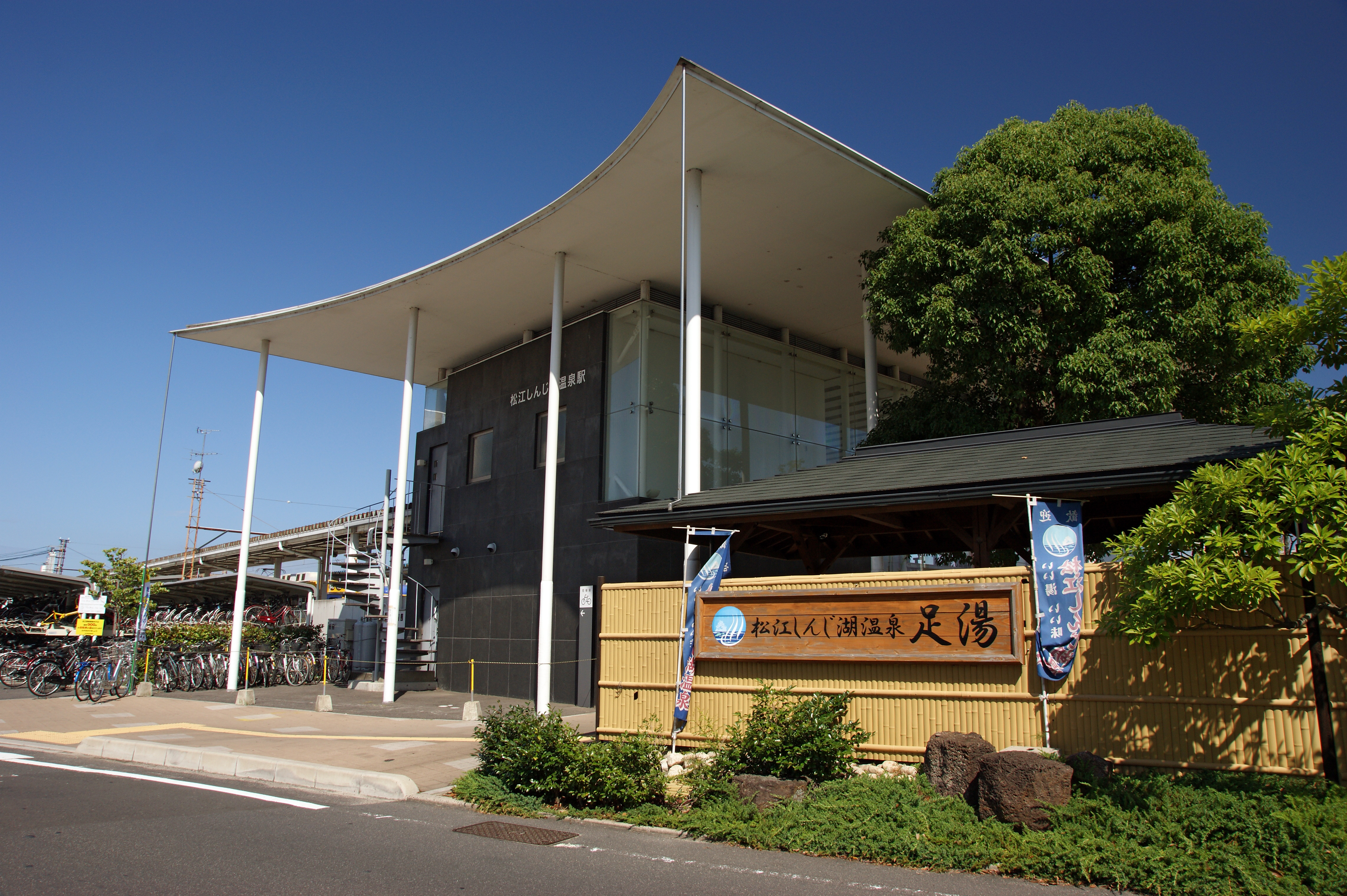
Foot bath

== Adjacent stations ==
«	Service	»
Ichibata Electric Railway
Kita-Matsue Line
Matsue English Garden Mae	Limited Express Superliner	Terminus
Matsue English Garden Mae	Express Izumotaisha	Terminus
Matsue English Garden Mae	Express	Terminus
Matsue English Garden Mae	Local	Terminus

== History ==
Matsue-Shinjiko-Onsen Station was opened on 5 April 1928 as Kita-Matsue Station (北松江駅). It was renamed Matsue-Onsen Station (松江温泉駅) on 1 October 1970. The name was changed to its present name on 1 April 2002.

== Passenger statistics ==
In fiscal 2019, the station was used by an average of 1843 passengers daily.

== Surrounding area ==
- Ichibata Electric Railway Head Office
- Matsue Shinjiko Hot Spring
- Shimane Prefectural Office
- Matsue City Hall - approximately 200m east.

== See also ==
- List of railway stations in Japan
