= Japan National Route 431 =

Road in Japan

National Route 431
- 国道431号
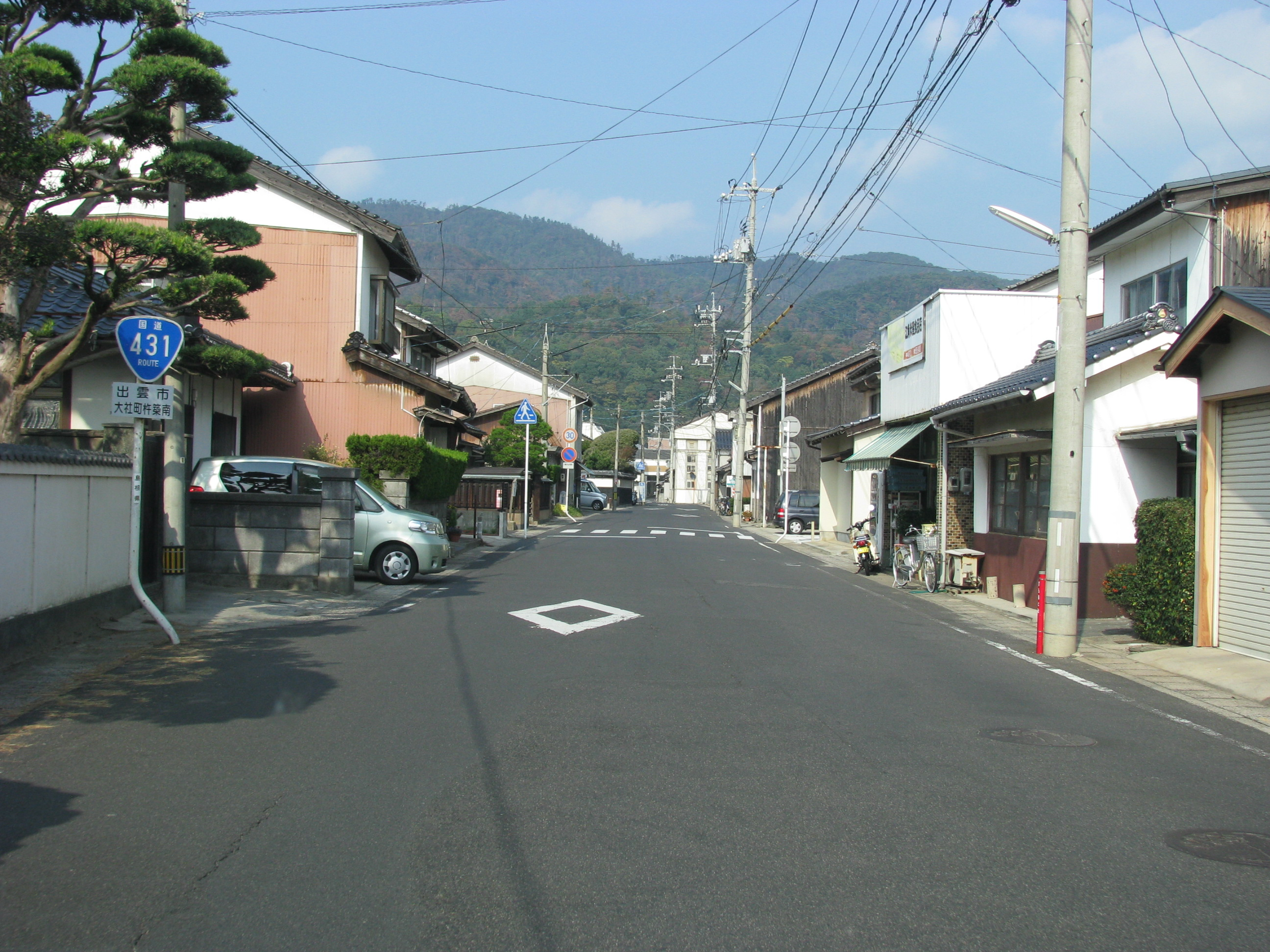

Route information
- Length: 93.5 km (58.1 mi)

Location
- Country: Japan

Highway system
- National highways of Japan; Expressways of Japan
| ← National Route 430 | → National Route 432 |

National Route 431 is a national highway of Japan connecting Izumo, Shimane and Yonago, Tottori in Japan, with a total length of 93.5 km (58.1 mi).
