= Lake Shinji =

Lake in Shimane Prefecture, Chūgoku region, Japan

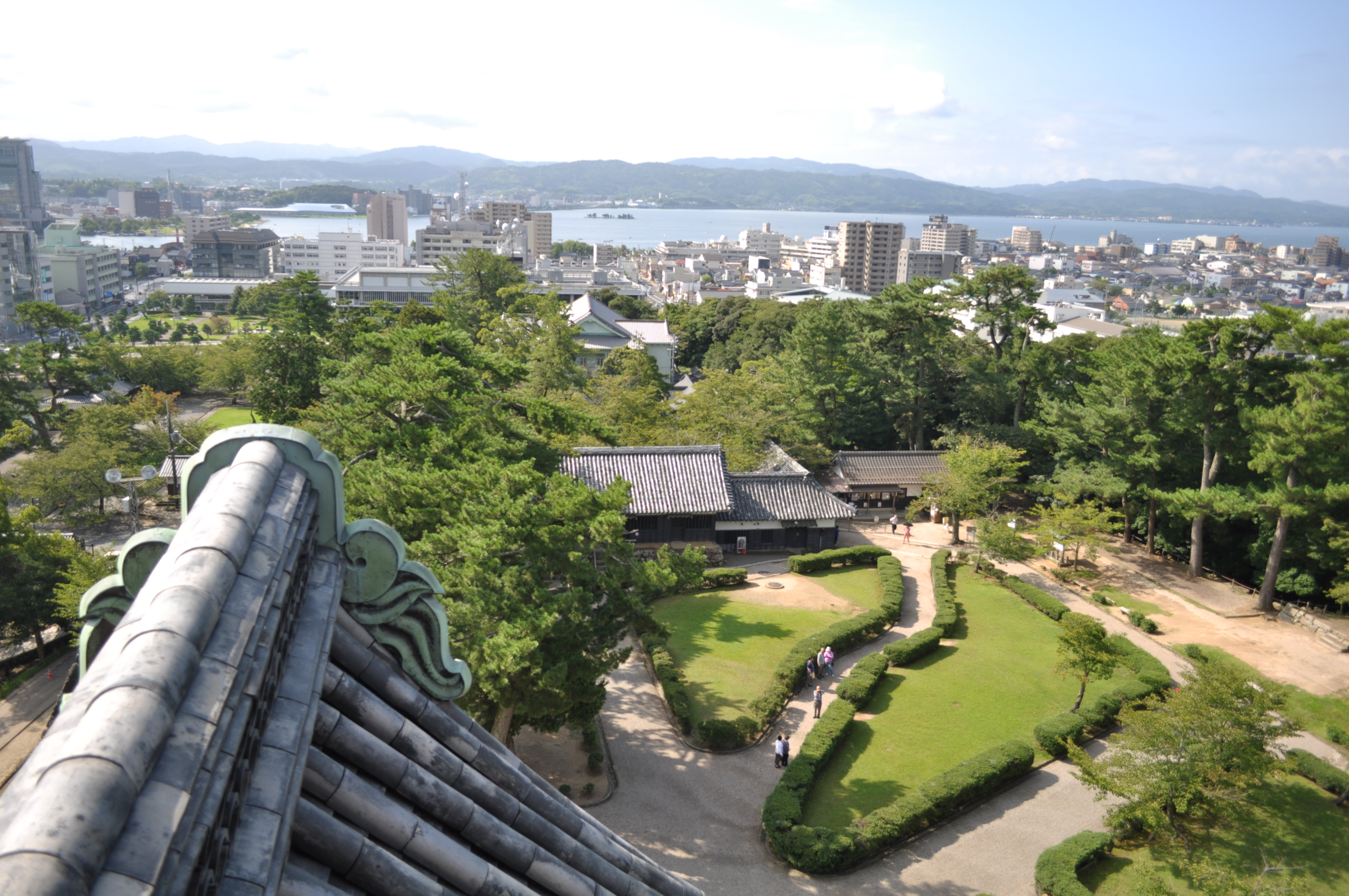
- View from Matsue Castle

- Location within Japan
- Location: Shimane Prefecture
- Coordinates: 35°27′N 132°58′E
- Type: Brackish, lagoon
- Basin countries: Japan

Ramsar Wetland
- Official name: Shinji-ko
- Designated: 8 November 2005
- Reference no.: 1556

Lake Shinji (宍道湖, Shinji-ko) is a brackish coastal lagoon in the northeast area of the Shimane Prefecture in Japan. It is considered to be the seventh largest lake in Japan, with a circumference of 48 kilometres (30 mi). It is enclosed by the Shimane Peninsula to the north, and the Izumo and Matsue plains to the west and east respectively. 7,652 ha (18,910 acres) of wetland are a Ramsar Site.

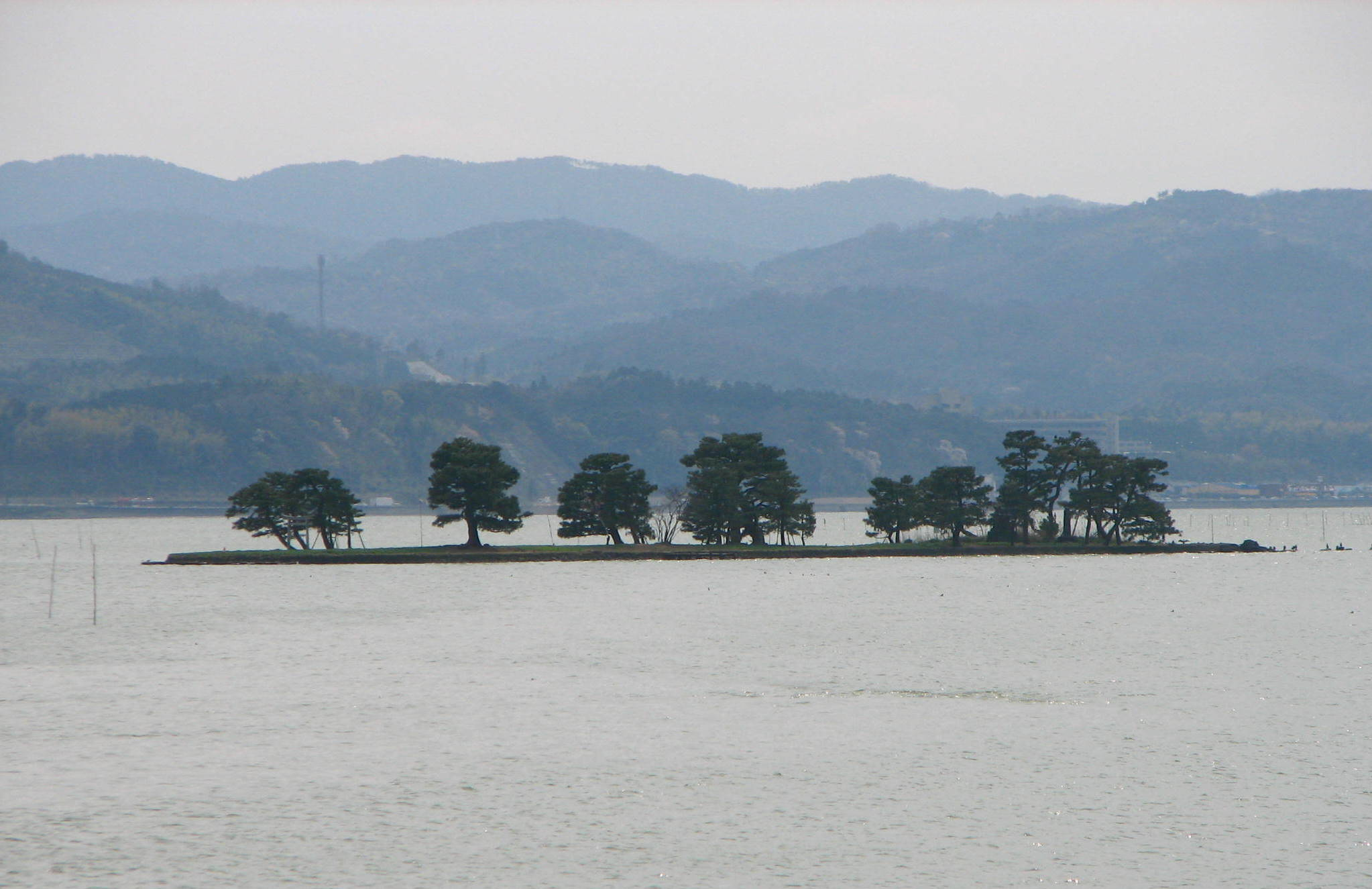
Yomegashima Island on Lake Shinji

Lake Shinji on a sunny day
