= Dentetsu Izumoshi Station =

Railway station in Izumo, Shimane Prefecture, Japan

Dentetsu Izumoshi Station 電鉄出雲市駅
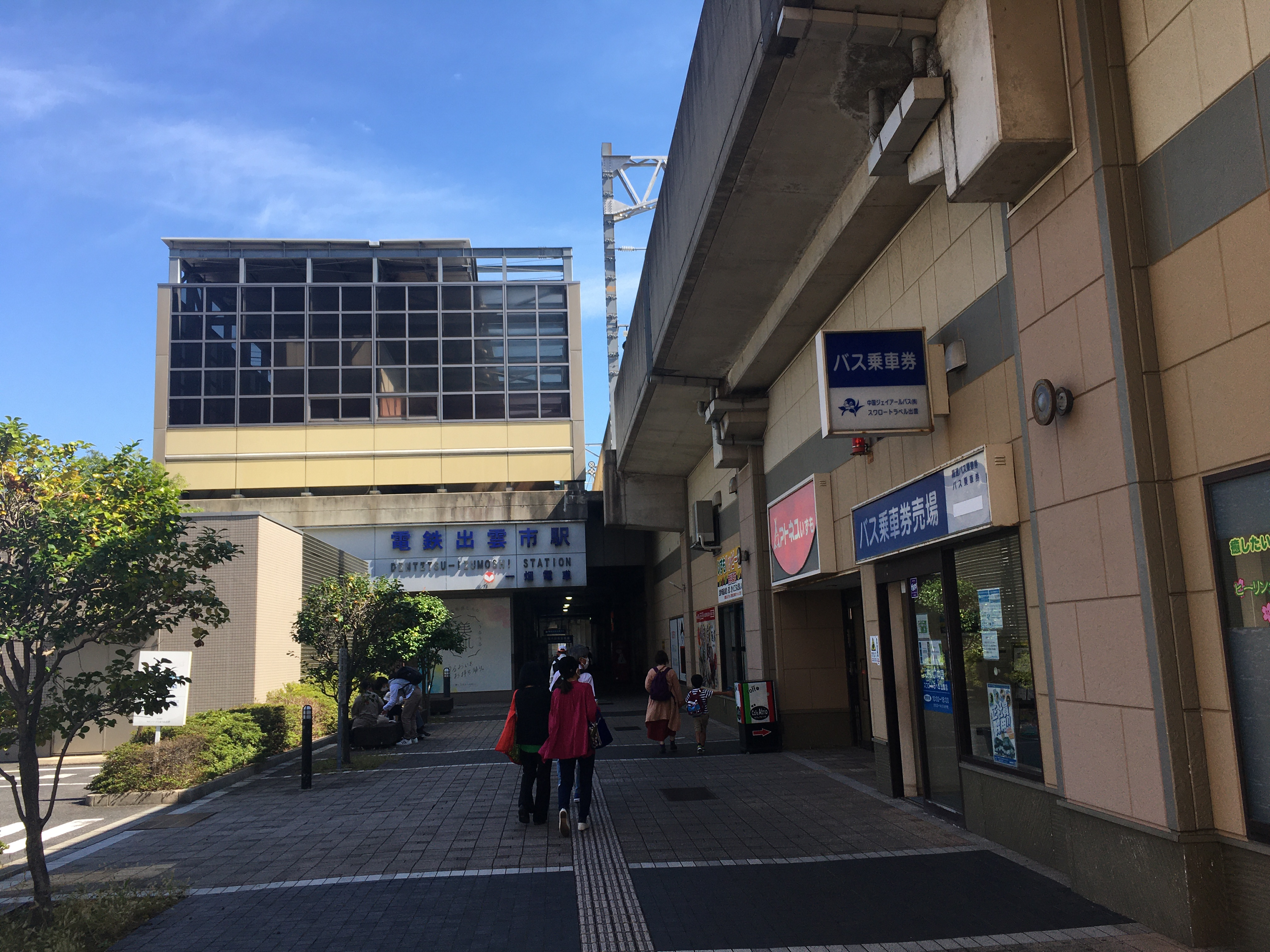
- Dentetsu Izumoshi Station, August 2019

General information
- Location: 10-1 Ekikitamachi, Izumo-shi, Shimane-ken 693-0007; Japan
- Coordinates: 35°21′40.1″N 132°45′29.56″E
- Operator: Ichibata Electric Railway
- Line: ■ Kita-Matsue Line
- Distance: 33.9 km (21.1 miles) from Matsue-Shinjiko-Onsen
- Platforms: 1 island platform
- Tracks: 2

Construction
- Structure type: at grade

Other information
- Status: Staffed
- Station code: 5
- Website: Official website

History
- Opened: 29 April 1914
- Former names: Izumo Imaichi (to 1957); Izumoshi (to 1964)

Passengers
- FY 2019: 1526 daily

Services
Preceding station	Ichibata Electric Railway	Following station
Terminus	Kita-Matsue Line Superliner Limited Express	Ōtsumachi towards Matsue-Shinjiko-Onsen
Terminus	Kita-Matsue Line Express Local	Izumo Science Center Park Town Mae towards Matsue-Shinjiko-Onsen
Location
- Location within Shimane Prefecture Location within Japan

Dentetsu Izumoshi Station (電鉄出雲市駅, Dentetsu Izumoshi-eki) is a passenger railway station located in the city of Izumo, Shimane Prefecture, Japan. It is operated by the private transportation company, Ichibata Electric Railway. Dentetsu Izumoshi Station is located 100 meters east of the JR West Izumoshi Station and there is no direct connection between buildings. Passengers wishing to change lines must exit the ticket gate to transfer between the two stations.

== Lines ==
Dentetsu Izumoshi Station is the terminus of the Kita-Matsue Line, and is located 33.9 kilometers from the opposing terminus of the line at Matsue-Shinjiko-Onsen. This station is served by local and express services.

== Station layout ==
The station consists of one elevated island platform. Regular trains generally use platform 2. The station is staffed.

== History ==
Dentetsu Izumoshi Station was opened on 29 April 1914 as Izumo Imaichi Station (出雲今市駅) on the Ichibata Light Railway Company, the predecessor of the current Ichibata Electric Railway. The station was merged into the Japan National Railway Izumoshi Station on 1 April 1957, but was rebuilt as an independent station of 1 April 1964, assuming its present name at that time.

== Passenger statistics ==
In fiscal 2019, the station was used by an average of 1526 passengers daily.

== Surrounding area ==
- Izumoshi Station
- Izumo Municipal Hospital
- Izumo City Second Junior High School

== See also ==
- List of railway stations in Japan
