= Taisha Line (disambiguation) =

The Taisha Line (大社線) is the name of two railway lines in Izumo, Shimane:

- Taisha Line (Bataden)
- Taisha Line (JR West)
