= Yōkan Station =

Railway station in Izumo, Shimane Prefecture, Japan

Yōkan Station 遙堪駅
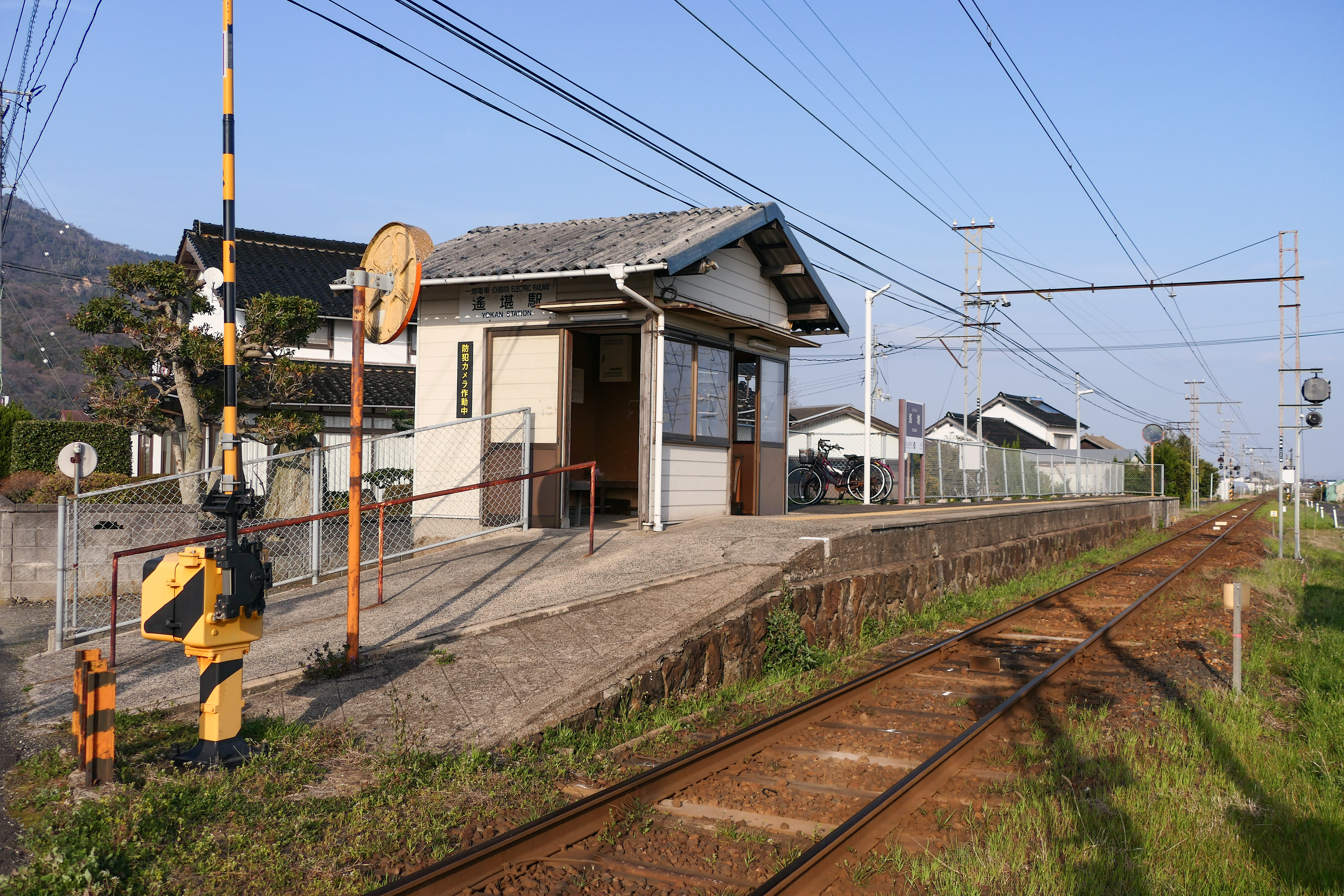
- Yōkan Station, 2024

General information
- Location: Tsunematsu-cho, Izumo-shi, Shimane-ken 693-0057; Japan
- Coordinates: 35°23′21.56″N 132°43′32.61″E
- Operator: Ichibata Electric Railway
- Line: ■ Taisha Line
- Distance: 4.8 km (3.0 miles) from Kawato
- Platforms: 1 side platform
- Tracks: 1

Construction
- Structure type: at grade

Other information
- Status: Unstaffed
- Station code: 24
- Website: Official website

History
- Opened: 2 February 1930

Passengers
- FY 2019: 43 daily
Location
- Location within Shimane Prefecture Location within Japan

Yōkan Station (遙堪駅, Yōkan-eki) is a passenger railway station located in the city of Izumo, Shimane Prefecture, Japan. It is operated by the private transportation company, Ichibata Electric Railway.

== Lines ==
Yōkan Station is served by the Taisha Line, and is located 4.8 kilometers from the terminus of the line at Kawato. This station is only served by local services.

== Station layout ==
The station consists of one side platform serving a single bi-directional track. There is no station building, but only a shelter on the platform. The station is unattended.

== Adjacent stations ==
«	Service	»
Ichibata Electric Railway
Taisha Line
Express: Does not stop at this station
Takahama	Local	Hamayamakōen-Kitaguchi

== History ==
Yōkan Station was opened on 2 February 1930.

== Passenger statistics ==
In fiscal 2019, the station was used by an average of 43 passengers daily.

== Surrounding area ==
- Izumo City Harutan Elementary School
- Asao Textile Industrial Factory

== See also ==
- List of railway stations in Japan
