= Hamayamakōen-Kitaguchi Station =

Railway station in Izumo, Shimane Prefecture, Japan

Hamayamakōen-mae Station 浜山公園北口駅
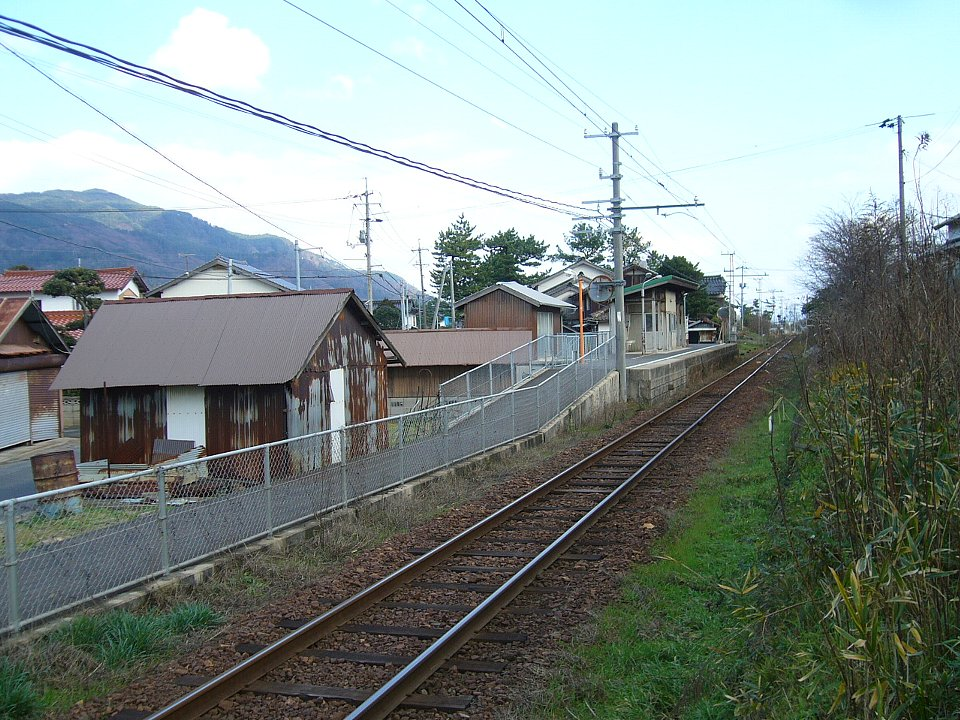
- Hamayamakōen-mae Station, January 2007

General information
- Location: Taisha-cho Nyunan, Izumo-shi, Shimane-ken 699-0732; Japan
- Coordinates: 35°23′21.13″N 132°42′29.76″E
- Operator: Ichibata Electric Railway
- Line: ■ Taisha Line
- Distance: 6.4 km (4.0 miles) from Kawato
- Platforms: 1 side platform
- Tracks: 1

Construction
- Structure type: at grade

Other information
- Status: Unstaffed
- Station code: 25
- Website: Official website

History
- Opened: 2 February 1930
- Former names: Yarigasaki (to 1977)

Passengers
- FY 2019: 193 daily
Location
- Location within Shimane Prefecture Location within Japan

Hamayamakōen-mae Station (浜山公園北口駅, Hamayamakōen-mae-eki) is a passenger railway station located in the city of Izumo, Shimane Prefecture, Japan. It is operated by the private transportation company, Ichibata Electric Railway.

== Lines ==
Hamayamakōen-mae Station is served by the Taisha Line, and is located 6.4 kilometers from the terminus of the line at Kawato. This station is served by local and express services.

== Station layout ==
The station consists of one side platform serving a single bi-directional track. The station is unattended.

== Adjacent stations ==
«	Service	»
Ichibata Electric Railway
Taisha Line
Express Izumotaisha: Does not stop at this station
Kawato	Express	Izumo Taisha-mae
Yōkan	Local	Izumo Taisha-mae

== History ==
Hamayamakōen-Kitaguchi Station was opened on 2 February 1930 as Yarigasaki Station (鑓ヶ崎駅). It was renamed to its present name on 24 June 1977.

== Passenger statistics ==
In fiscal 2019, the station was used by an average of 193 passengers daily.

== Surrounding area ==
- Shimane Prefectural Hamayama Park
- Izumo Cultural Tradition Museum
- Shimane Winery
- Shimane Prefectural Taisha High School

== See also ==
- List of railway stations in Japan
