= Takahama Station =

Takahama Station is a name for several railroad stations in Japan.

- Takahama Station (Ibaraki) - in Ibaraki Prefecture
- Takahama Station (Shimane) - in Shimane Prefecture
- Takahama Station (Ehime) - in Ehime Prefecture
