= Takahama Station (Shimane) =

Railway station in Izumo, Shimane Prefecture, Japan

Takahama Station 高浜駅
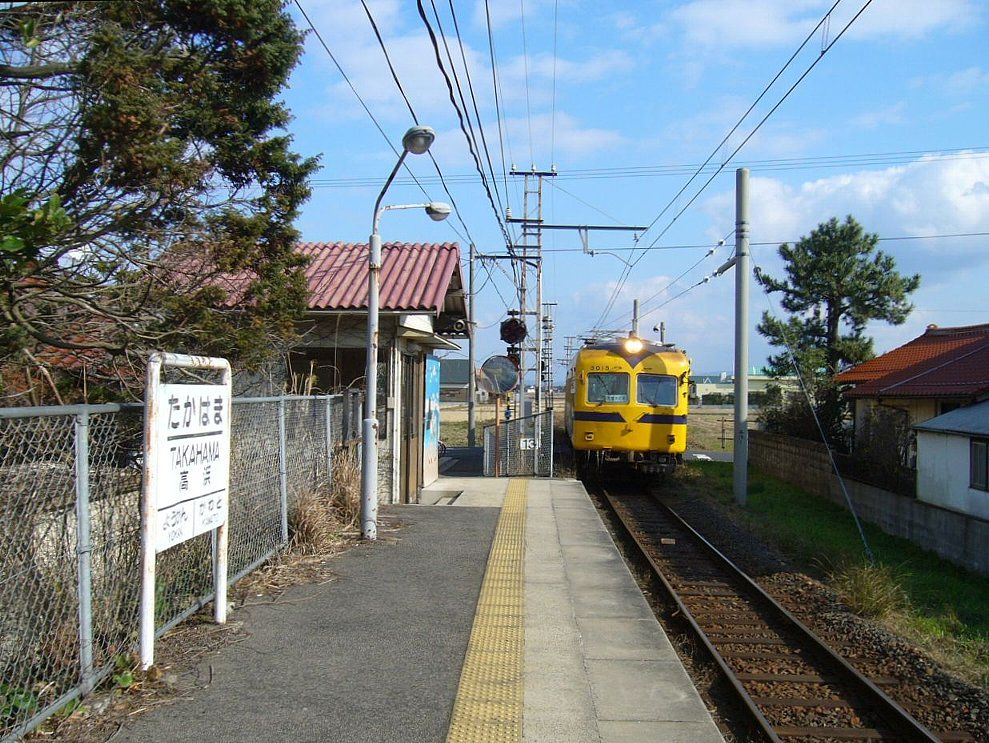
- Takahama Station, January 2007

General information
- Location: 793-3 Satogatacho, Izumo-shi, Shimane-ken 693-0064; Japan
- Coordinates: 35°23′27.16″N 132°44′49.1″E
- Operator: Ichibata Electric Railway
- Line: ■ Taisha Line
- Distance: 2.8 km (1.7 miles) from Kawato
- Platforms: 1 side platform
- Tracks: 1

Construction
- Structure type: at grade

Other information
- Status: Unstaffed
- Station code: 23
- Website: Official website

History
- Opened: 2 February 1930

Passengers
- FY 2019: 125 daily
Location
- Location within Shimane Prefecture Location within Japan

Takahama Station (高浜駅, Takahama-eki) is a passenger railway station located in the city of Izumo, Shimane Prefecture, Japan. It is operated by the private transportation company, Ichibata Electric Railway.

== Lines ==
Takahama Station is served by the Taisha Line, and is located 2.8 kilometers from the terminus of the line at Kawato. This station is only served by local services.

== Station layout ==
The station consists of one side platform serving a single bi-directional track. There is no station building, but only a shelter on the platform. The station is unattended.

== Adjacent stations ==
«	Service	»
Ichibata Electric Railway
Taisha Line
Express: Does not stop at this station
Kawato	Local	Yōkan

== History ==
Takahama Station was opened on 2 February 1930.

== Passenger statistics ==
In fiscal 2019, the station was used by an average of 125 passengers daily.

== Surrounding area ==
- Japan National Route 431
- Izumo Dome
- Izumo City Takahama Elementary School
- Satogata Kindergarten has preserved a Deha 3 and Deha 6 carriages, which are original vehicles of the Ichibata Electric Railway. It is located 300 meters east of Takahama Station next to the railroad tracks, and can be seen from the south side of the train window.

== See also ==
- List of railway stations in Japan
