= Taisha Line (Bataden) =

Railway line in Izumo, Shimane

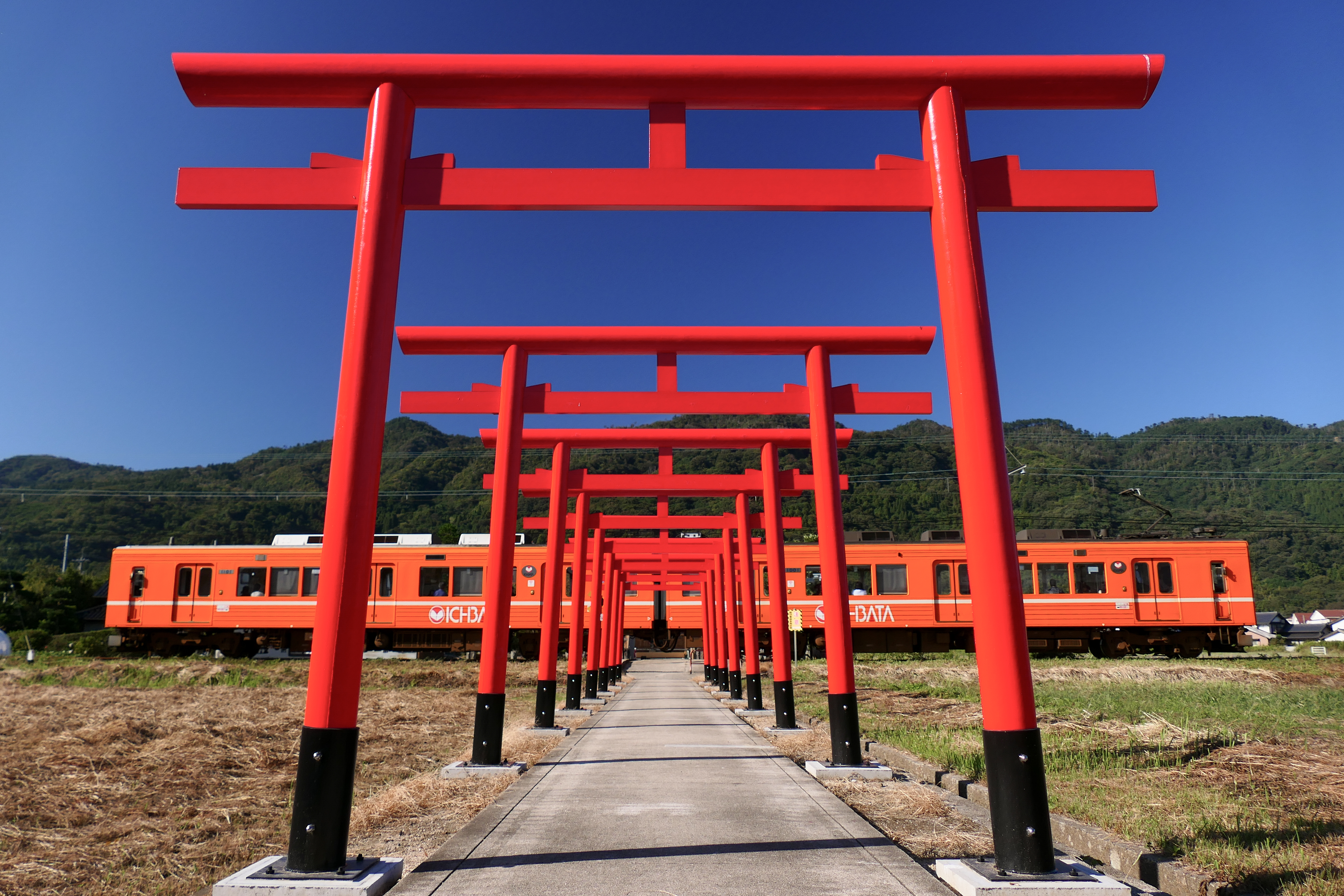
- A 1000-series passenger train on the Taisha Line with the Awazu Ino Shrine

Overview
- Native name: 大社線
- Owner: Ichibata Electric Railway
- Locale: Shimane Prefecture
- Termini: Kawato; Izumo Taisha-mae
- Stations: 5
- Website: http://www.ichibata.co.jp

Service
- Type: Heavy rail

History
- Opened: 2 February 1930; 96 years ago

Technical
- Line length: 8.3 km (5.2 mi)
- Track gauge: 1,067 mm (3 ft 6 in)
- Electrification: Overhead line, DC 1,500 V
Route map

The Taisha Line (大社線, Taisha-sen) is a 8.3 km railway line owned by the Ichibata Electric Railway. The line connects Kawato Station with Izumo Taisha-mae Station, all within Izumo, Shimane Prefecture, Japan.

With the closure of JR West's Taisha Line in 1990, this line became the only line connecting passengers to the Izumo-taisha.

== Operations ==
The line is electrified with overhead lines and is single-tracked for the entire line. No passing loops exist on the line.

Though the line terminates at Kawato Station, some services continue along the Kita-Matsue Line to Matsue Shinjiko-Onsen Station. There are local, express, and limited express services that run along on the line, along with the Izumotaisha express service.

== Stations ==
All stations are within Izumo, Shimane.

Code	Name		Distance (km)	Connections
5	Kawato	川跡	0.0	Kita-Matsue Line
23	Takahama	高浜	2.8	
24	Yōkan	遙堪	4.8	
25	Hamayamakōen-Kitaguchi	浜山公園北口	6.4	
26	Izumo Taisha-mae	出雲大社前	8.3	
