= Taisha Station =

Former Japanese railway station

Taisha Station 大社駅
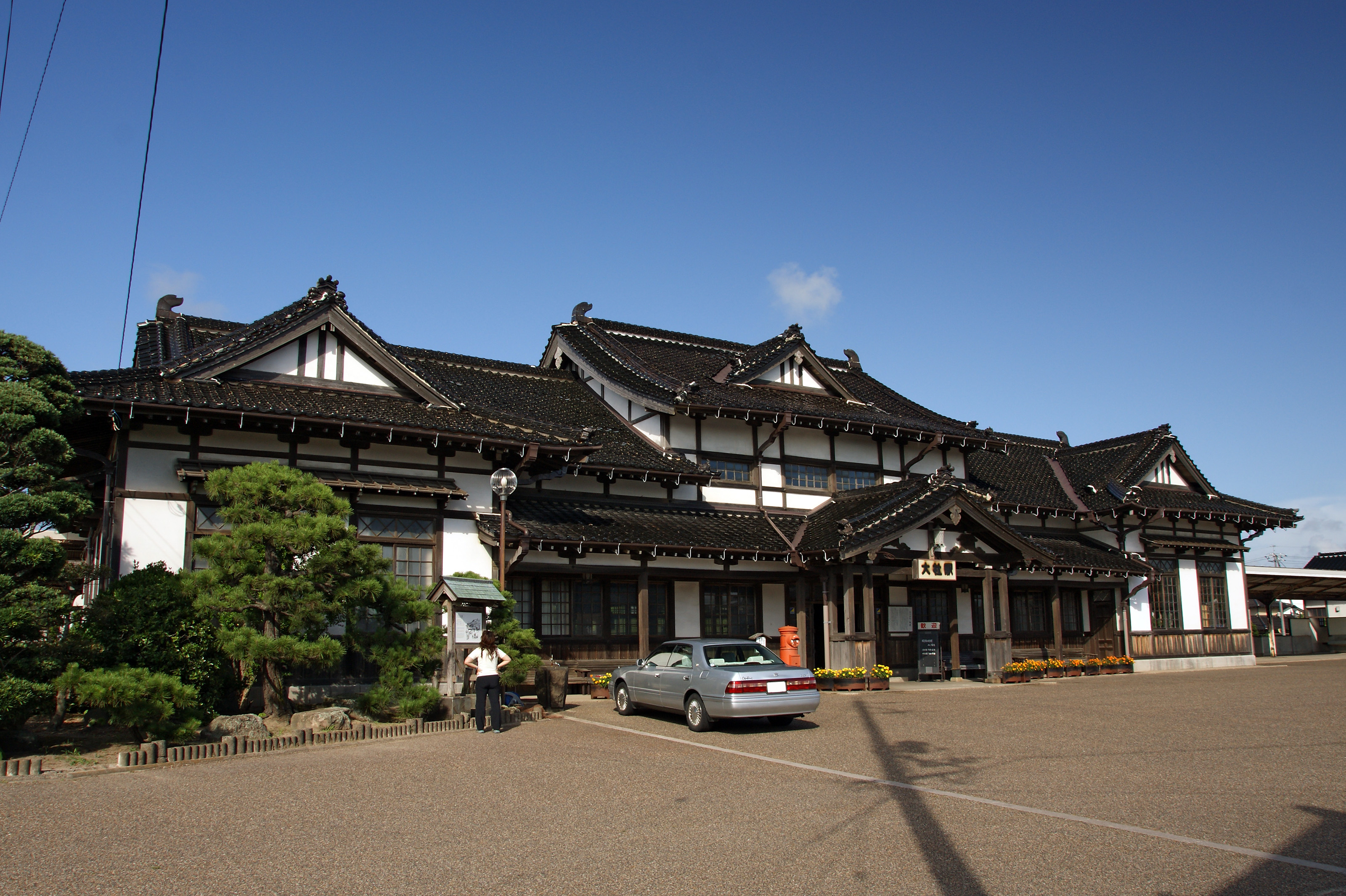
- Taisha Station (2008)

General information
- Location: Hikawa District, Taisha-cho kita-araki, Shimane-ken; Japan
- Operator: JR West
- Line: Taisha Line (JR West)
- Distance: 7.5 kilometers from Izumoshi
- Platforms: 2 platforms

Other information
- Status: Unstaffed

History
- Opened: June 1, 1912
- Closed: April 1, 1990

Passengers
- FY1989: 383 daily
Location

Taisha Station (大社駅, Taisha-eki) was a railway station in the city of Izumo, Shimane, Japan, operated by West Japan Railway Company. The station opened on June 1, 1912 and closed on April 1, 1990 due to lack of ridership along with the entire line. The station building was designated as Important Cultural Property in 2004 and a Heritage of Industrial Modernization in 2009.

== History ==
The station was opened in 1912 following the opening of the Taisha Line. The station was closed in 1990 following the closure of Taisha Line. However, unlike the other 2 stations in the line that were demolished, only leaving a platform after the closure, the station building was designated as Important Cultural Property in 2004, and Heritage of Industrial Modernization in 2009 and were left mostly intact. In 2021, the works to preserve the building began which is set to end by 2025, and the station is currently temporarily closed.

== Adjacent stations ==
JR West
Taisha Line

Arakaya Station - Taisha Station

== Station building ==
The station had a side platform and an island platform, and was built on the ground. The 3 tracks merged into 1 track at the end of the line where the buffer stop is located. The distance between the station and the buffer stop were extremely long, and even had a level crossing. The platforms were large enough to fit longer trains as several express train services from Tokyo, Osaka, and Nagoya used to make a stop in the station.

The current remaining station building were made in 1924, resembling Izumo-taisha. There were ticket gates for group visitors, which remains as how it was when the station was closed. There are 3 Important Cultural Properties in Japan that are station buildings, but only Taisha Station is made of wood.

== Passenger statistics ==
The station had a total of 383 boardings daily.

== Surrounding area ==
- Izumo-taisha
- Grave of Izumo no Okuni
- Hinomisaki Shrine

== Gallery ==
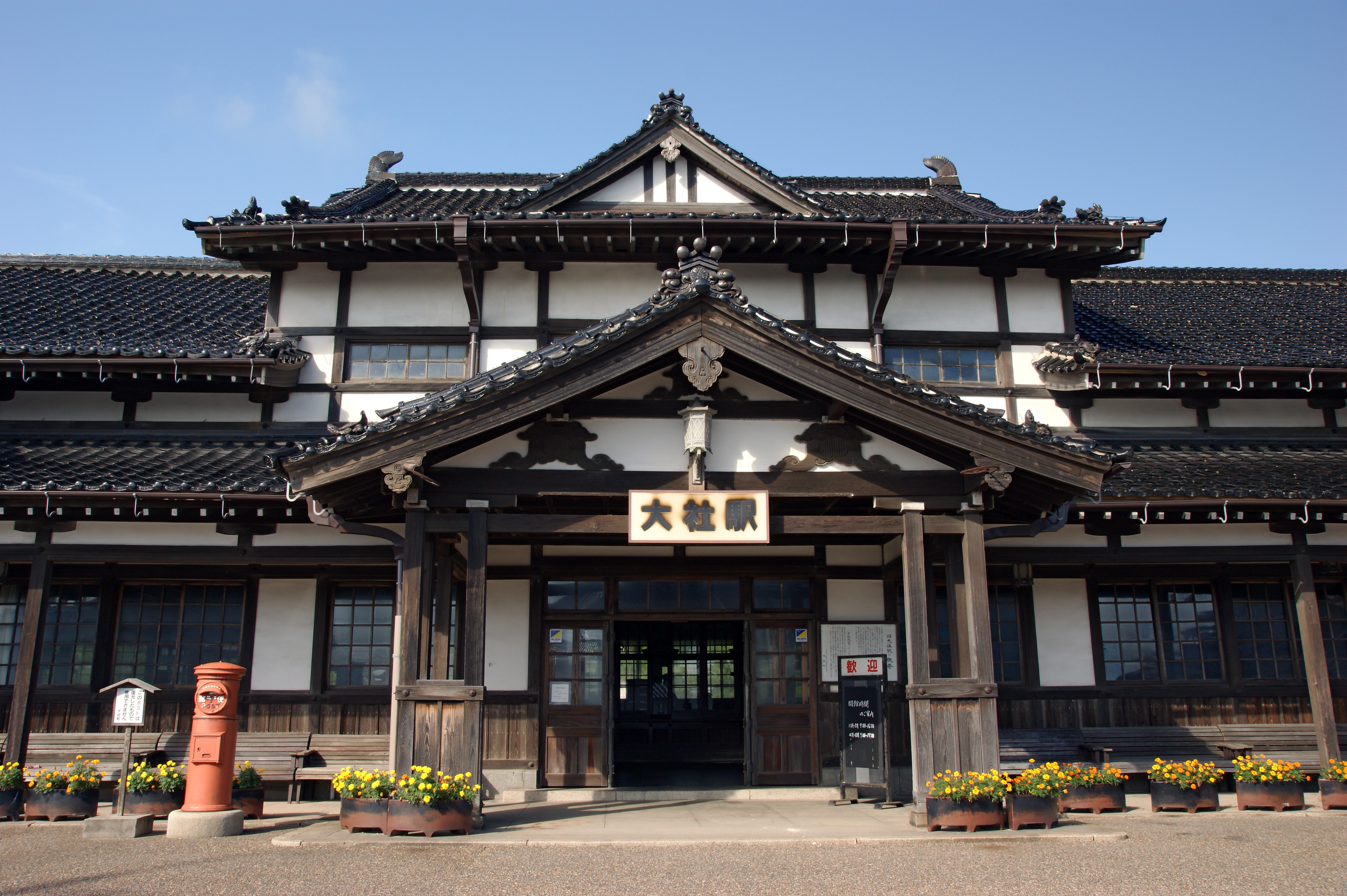
The entrance

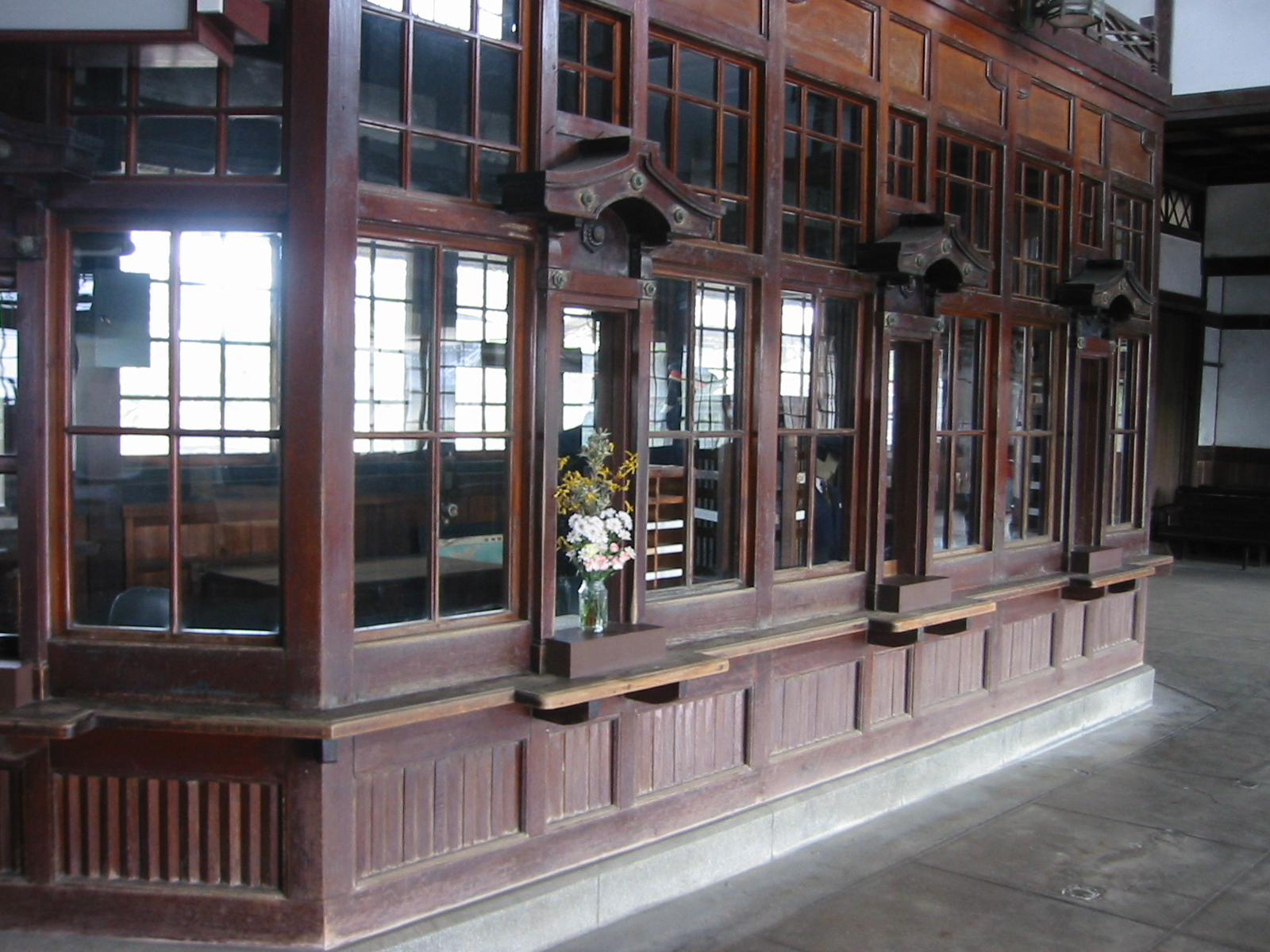
Information center inside the building

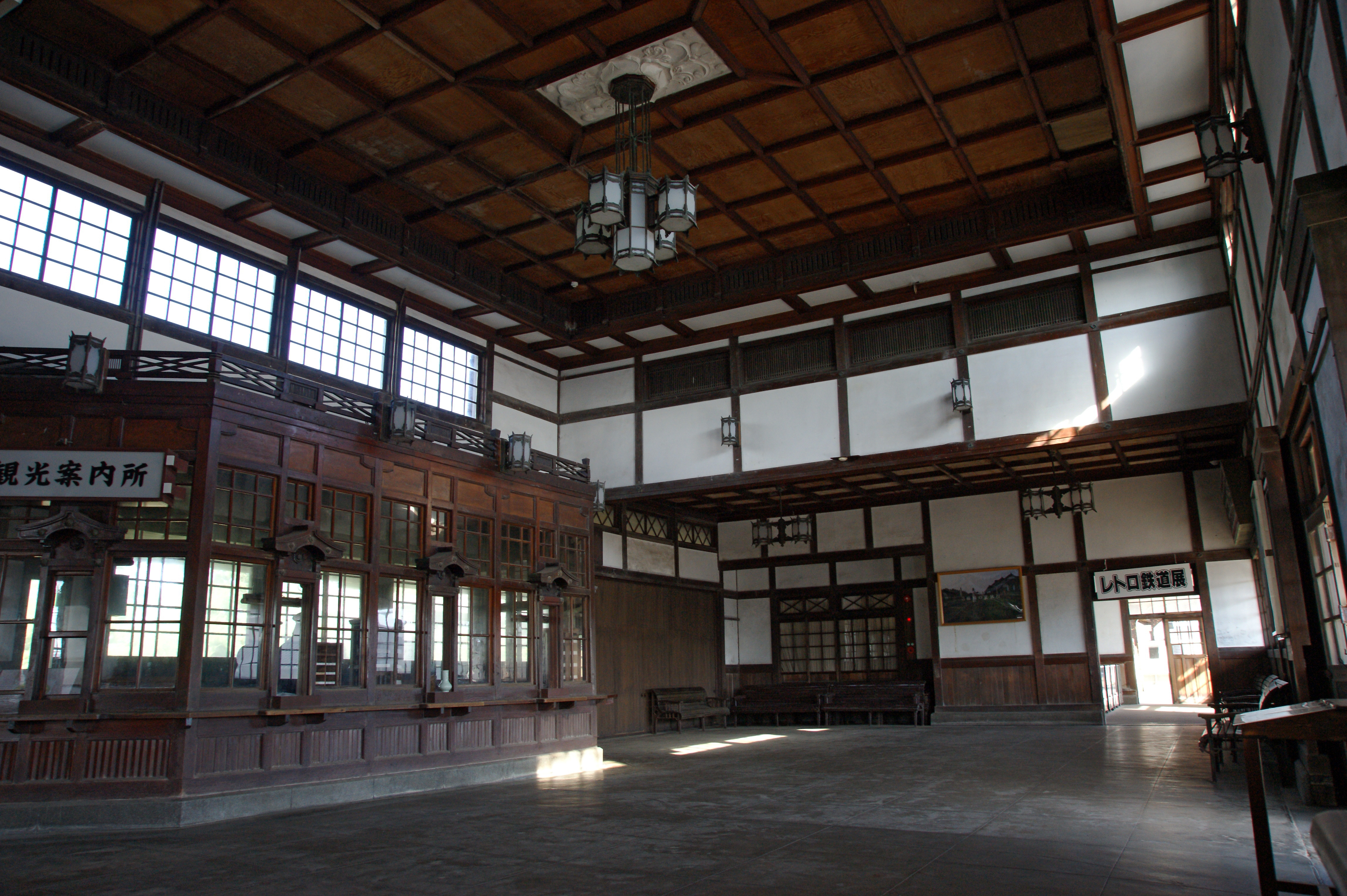
Interiors of the station

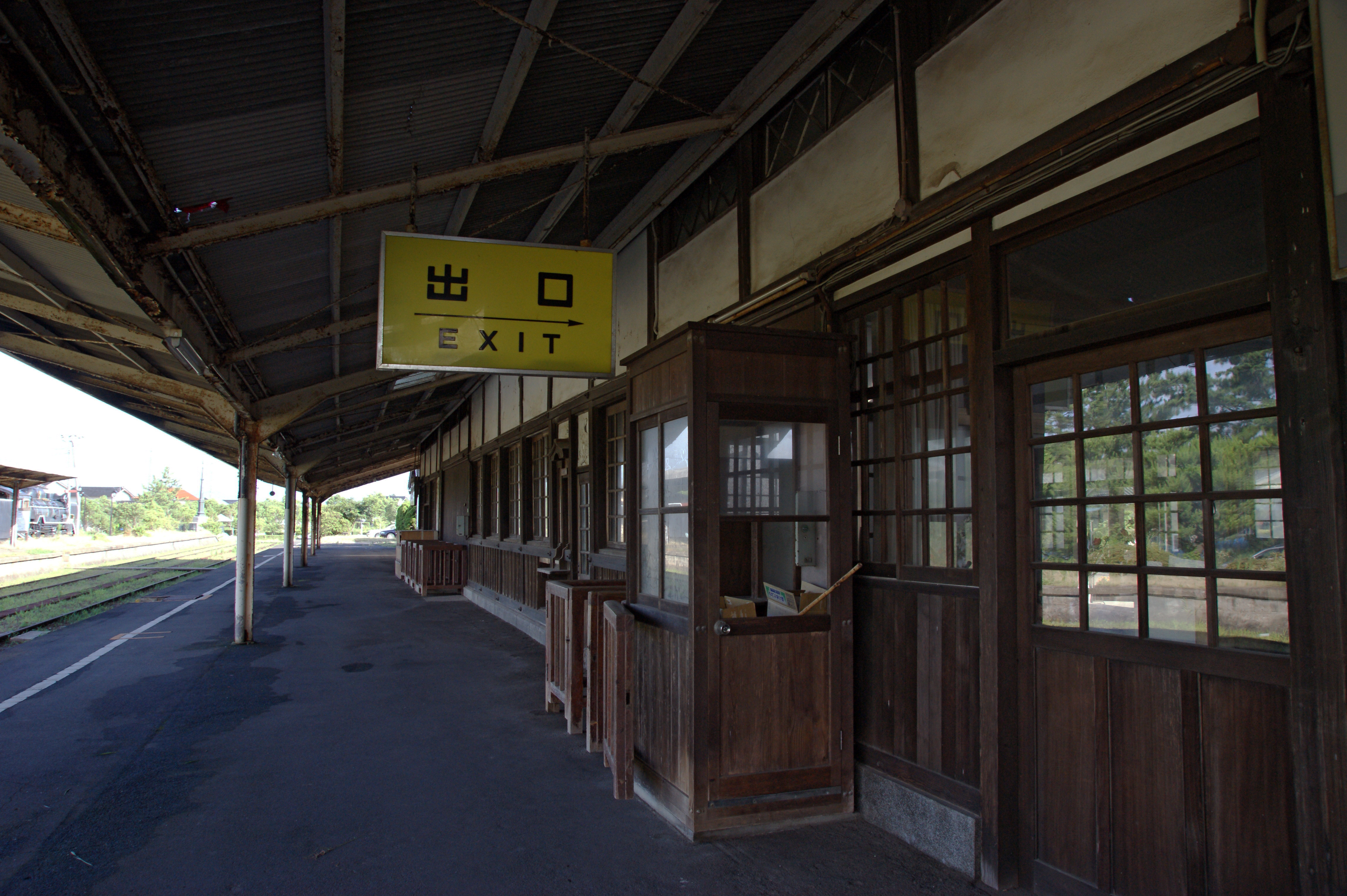
Platform

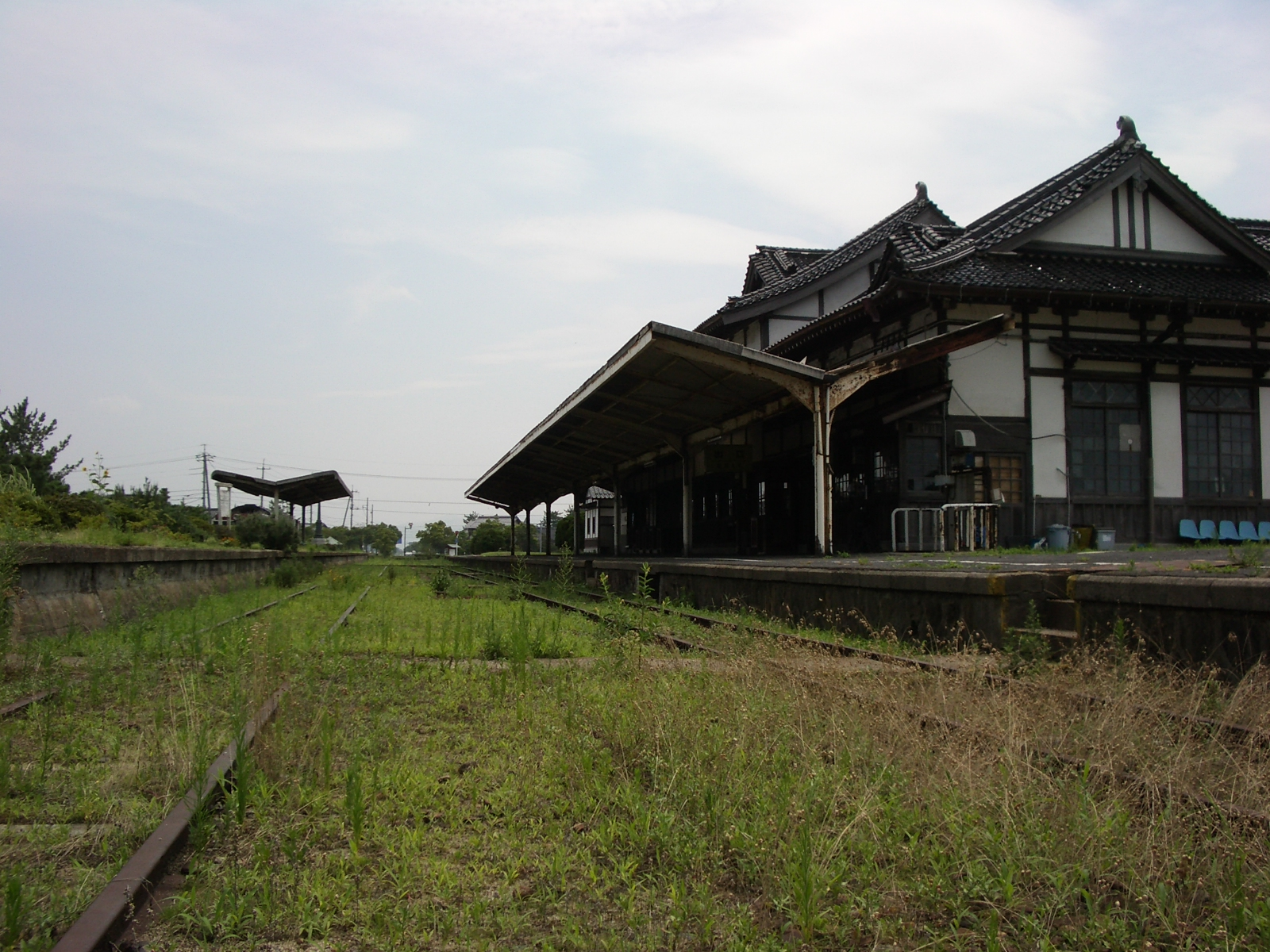
Remains of the tracks

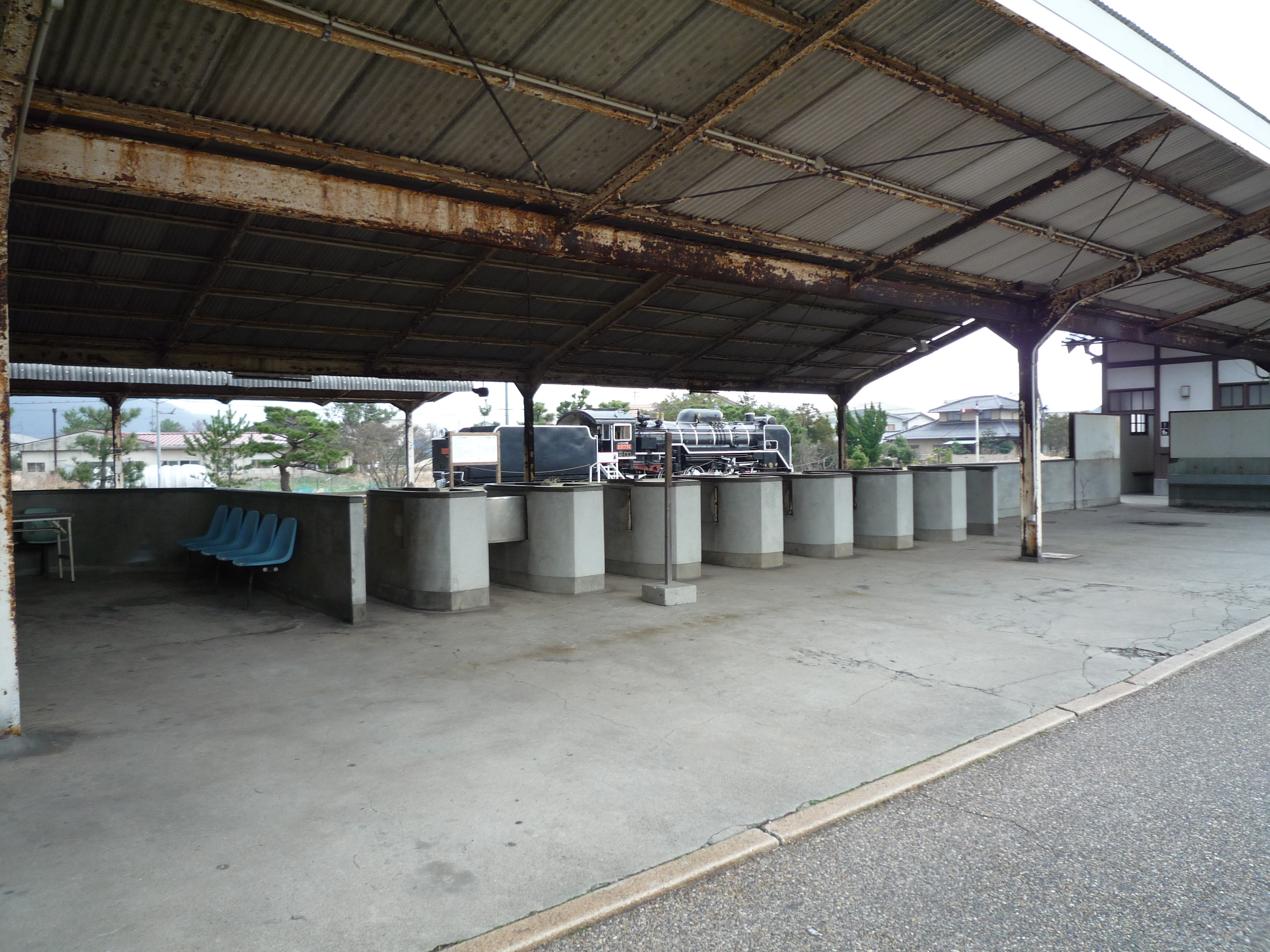
Ticket gate

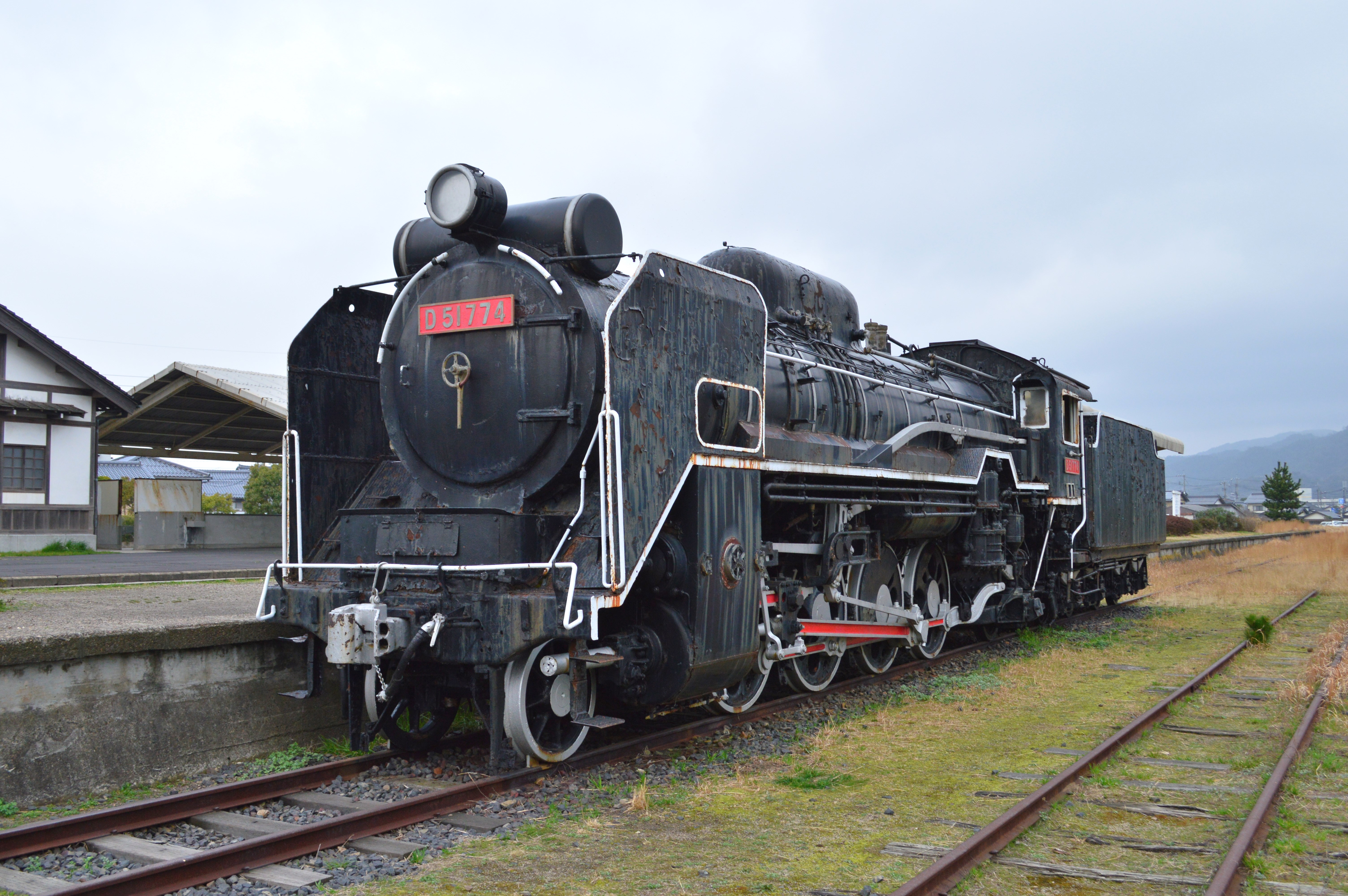
D51774Steam Locomotive which is preserved in the station

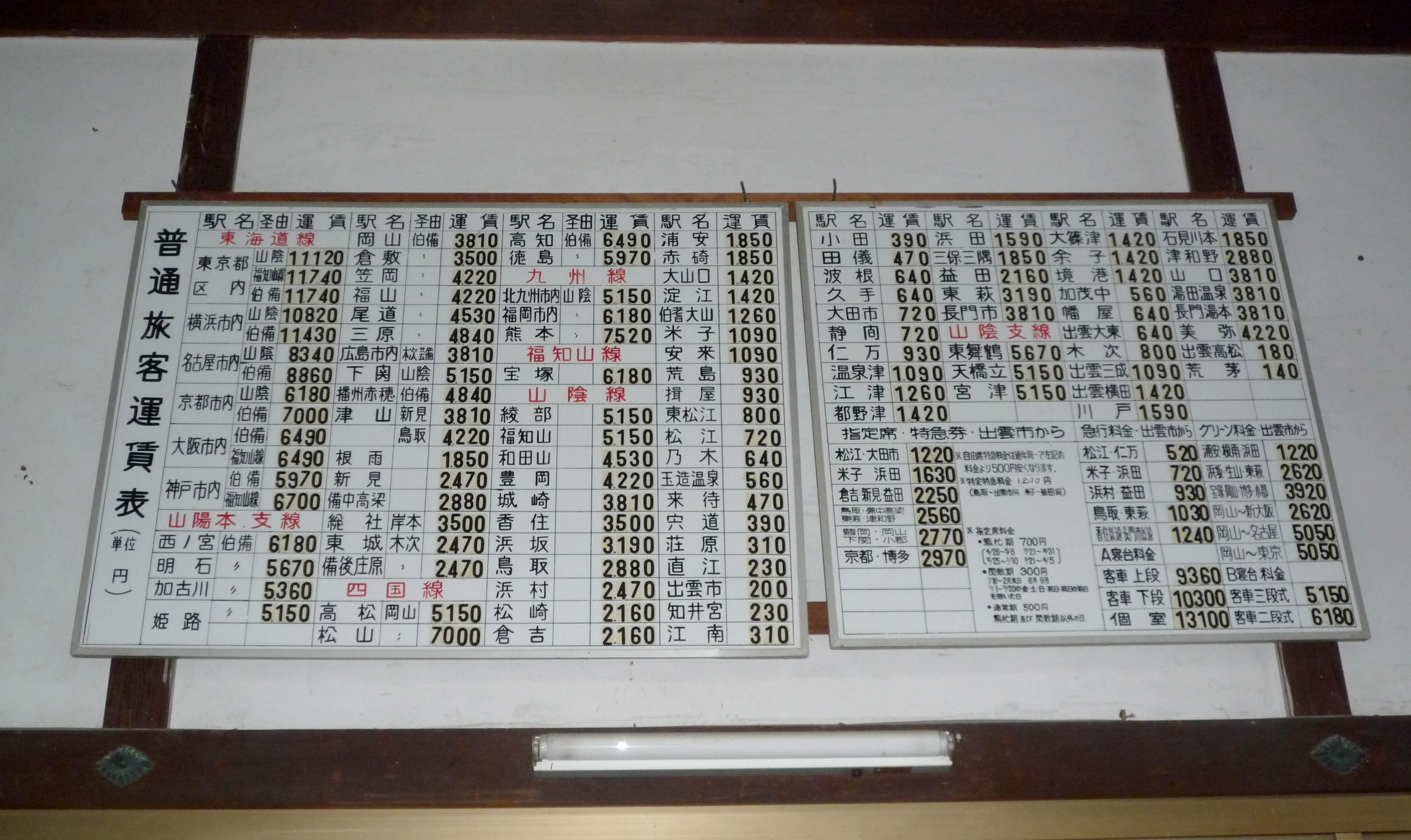
The passenger fare table at the time of closure

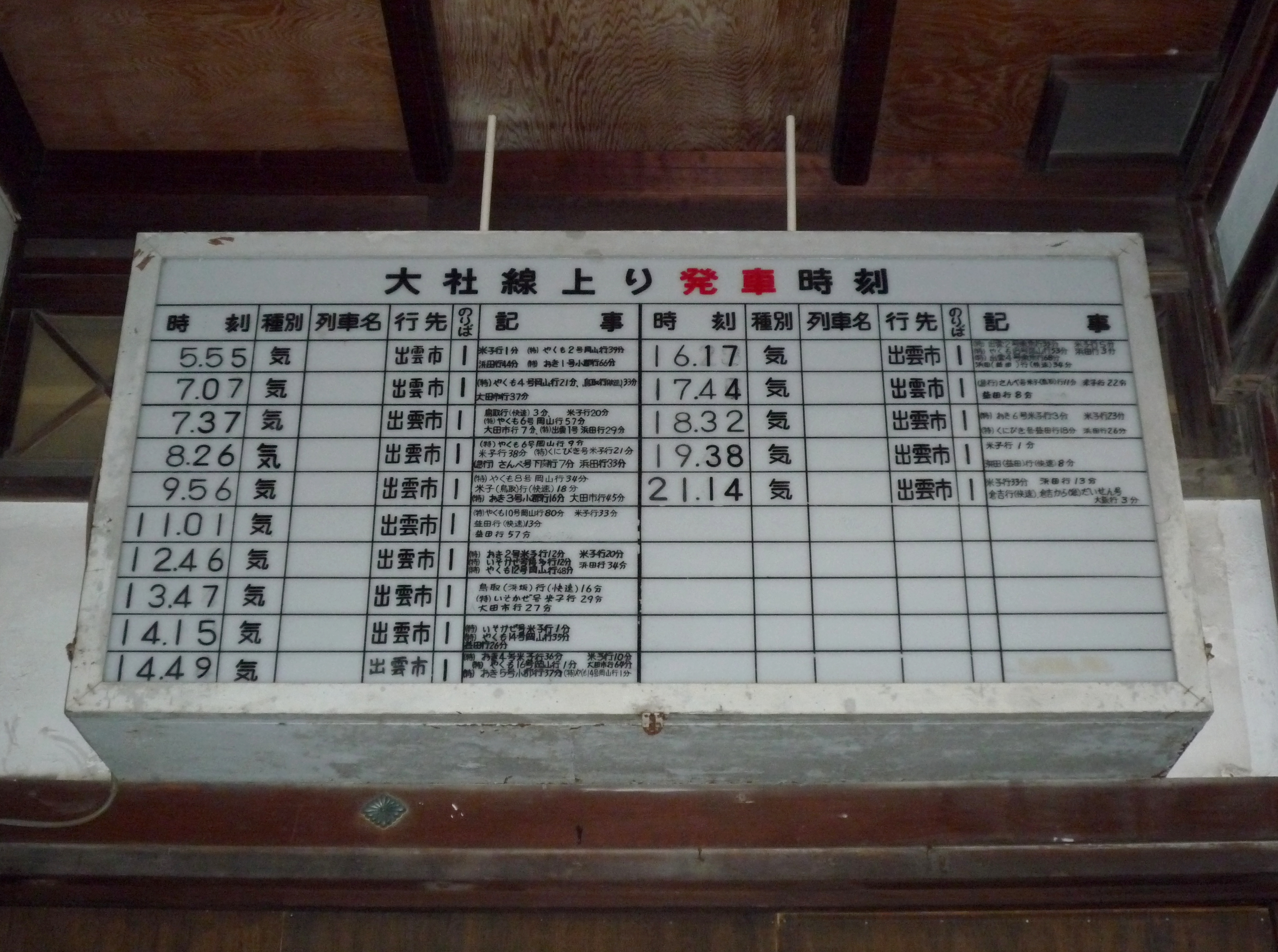
The timeable of the station at the time of closure

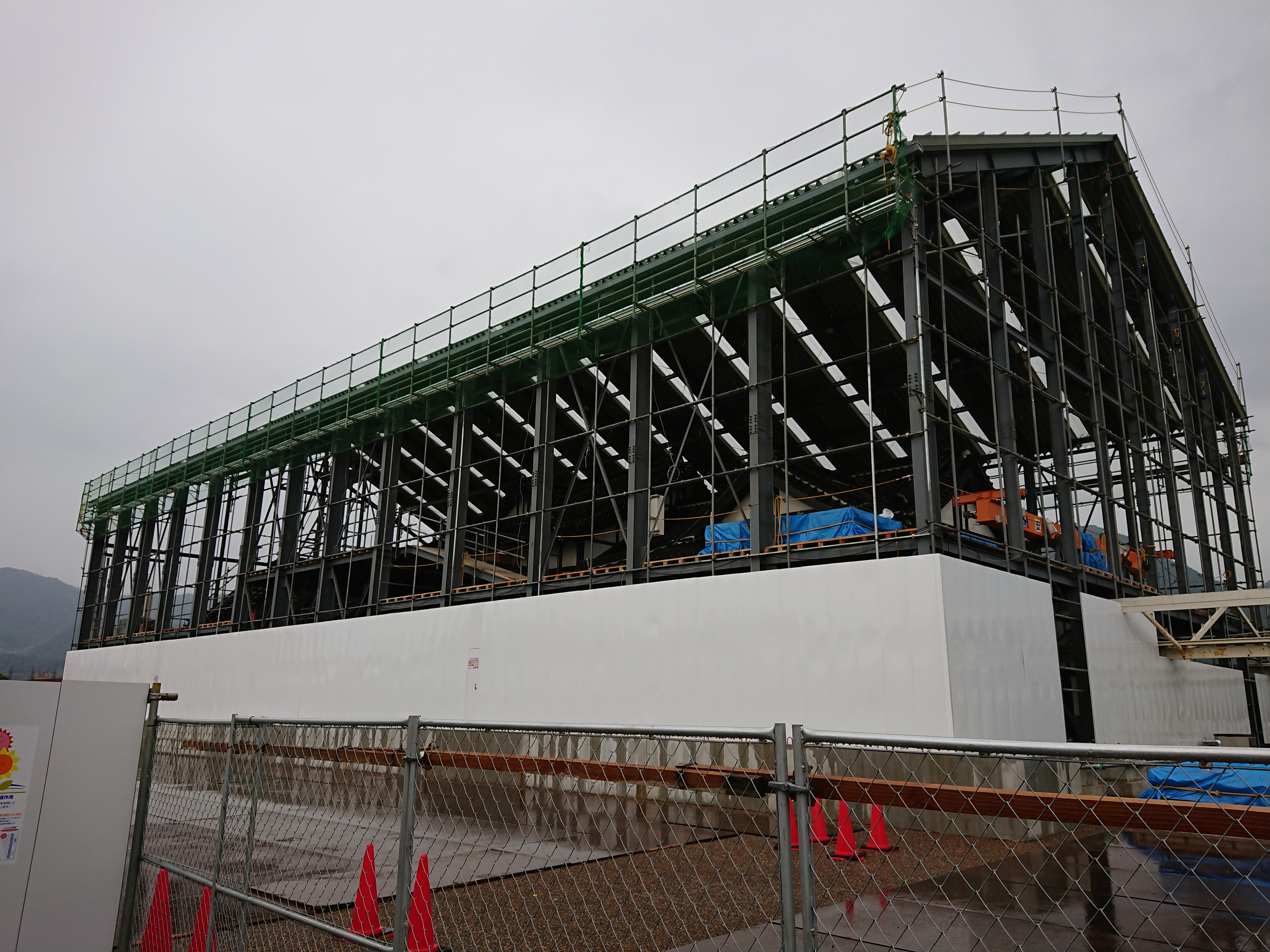
Former Taisha Station undergoing construction (June 2021)
