= Izumo Dome =

Sporting arena in Izumo, Shimane, Japan

Coordinates: 35°22′58.50″N 132°44′25.80″E

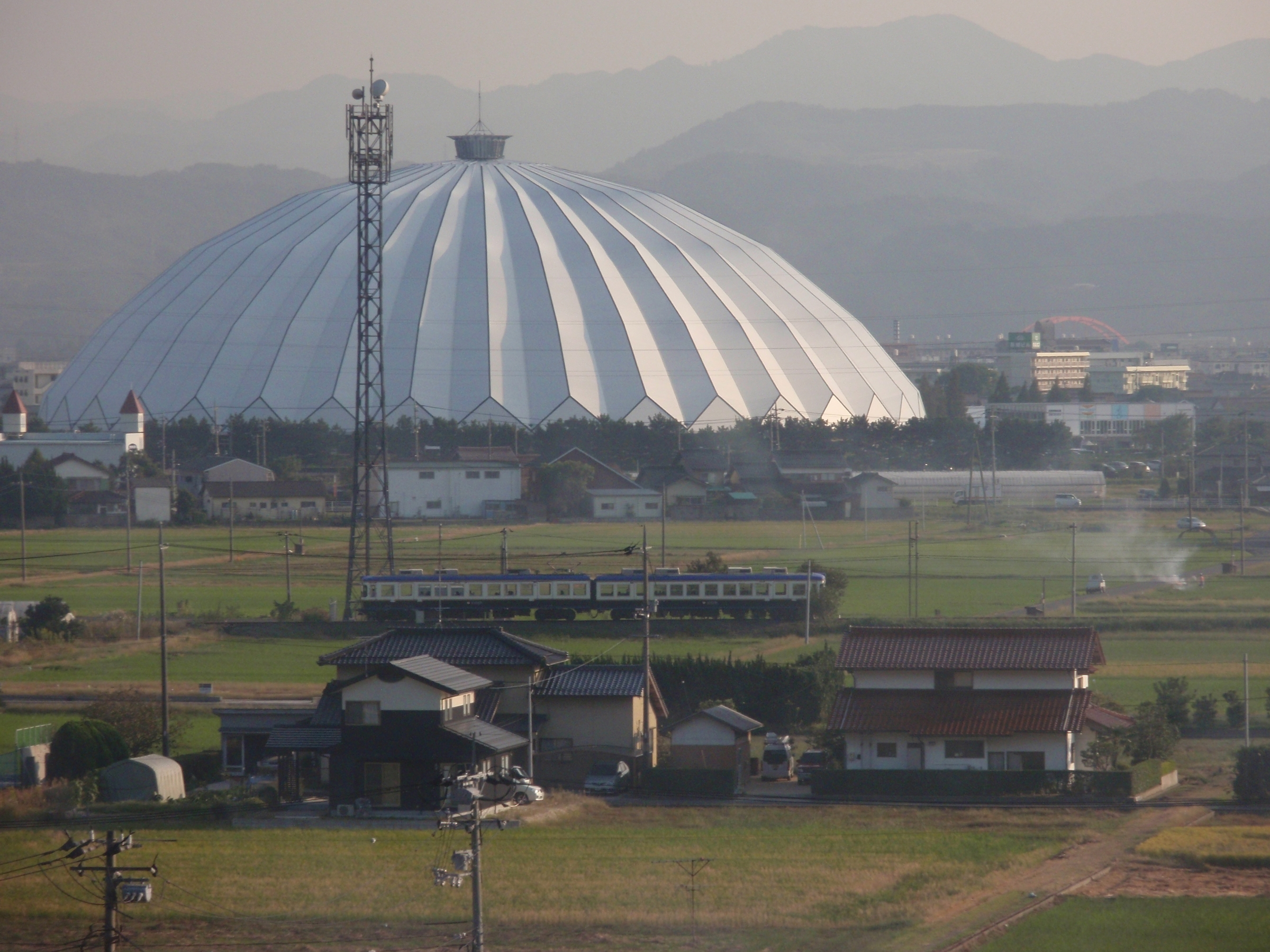
Izumo Dome and Ichibata Electric Railway

Izumo Dome (出雲ドーム, Izumo Dōmu) is an indoor sporting arena located in Izumo, Shimane, Japan. The capacity of the arena is 2,500 people and was opened in 1992 (34 years ago).

It has the distinction of being Japan's largest wooden building at 49 metres (161 ft) high and 143 metres (469 ft) in diameter.

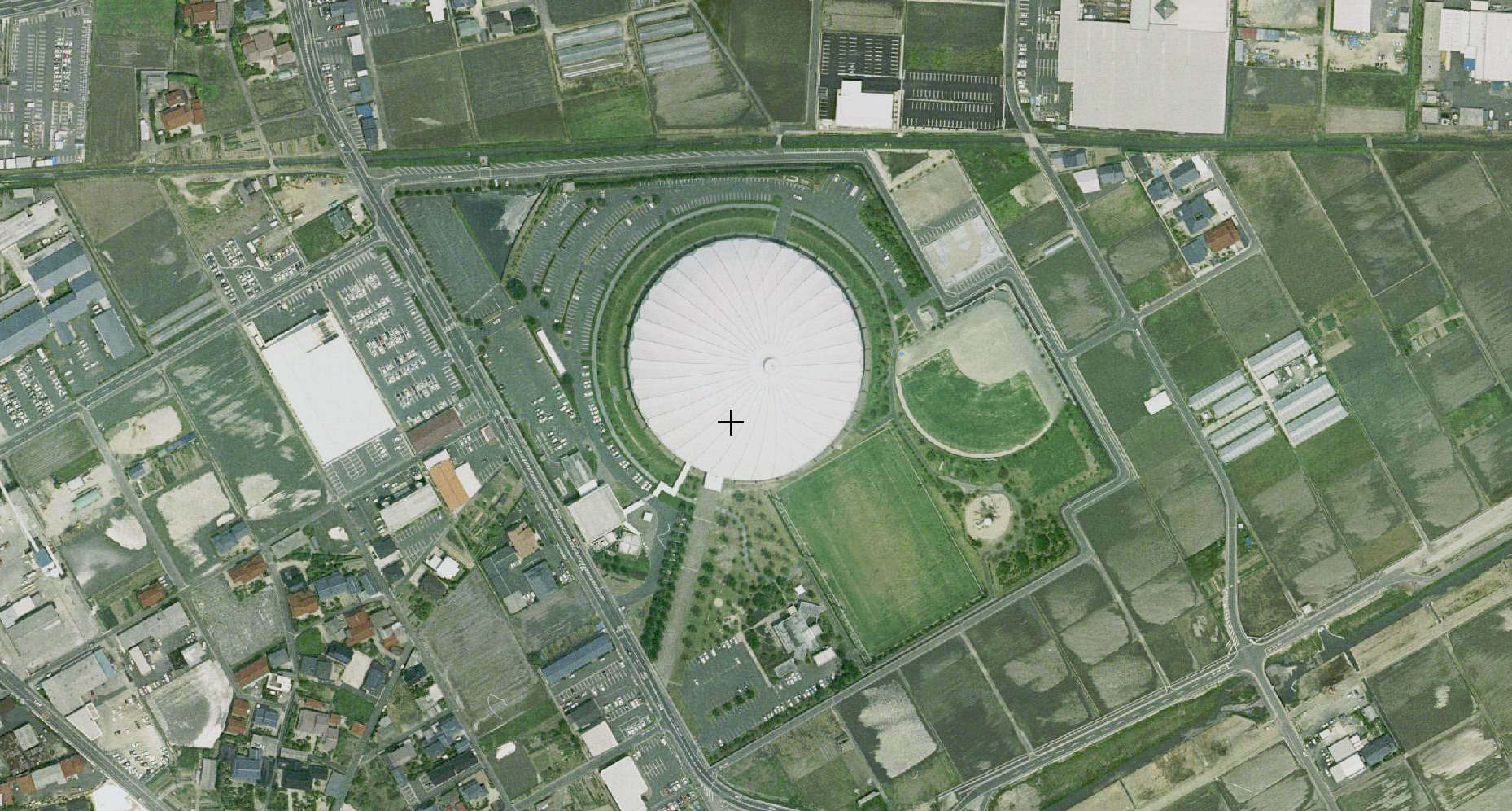
Satellite view
