= Izumo Taisha-mae Station =

Railway station in Izumo, Shimane Prefecture, Japan

Coordinates: 35°23′36.85″N 132°41′13.59″E

Izumo Taisha-mae Station 出雲大社前駅
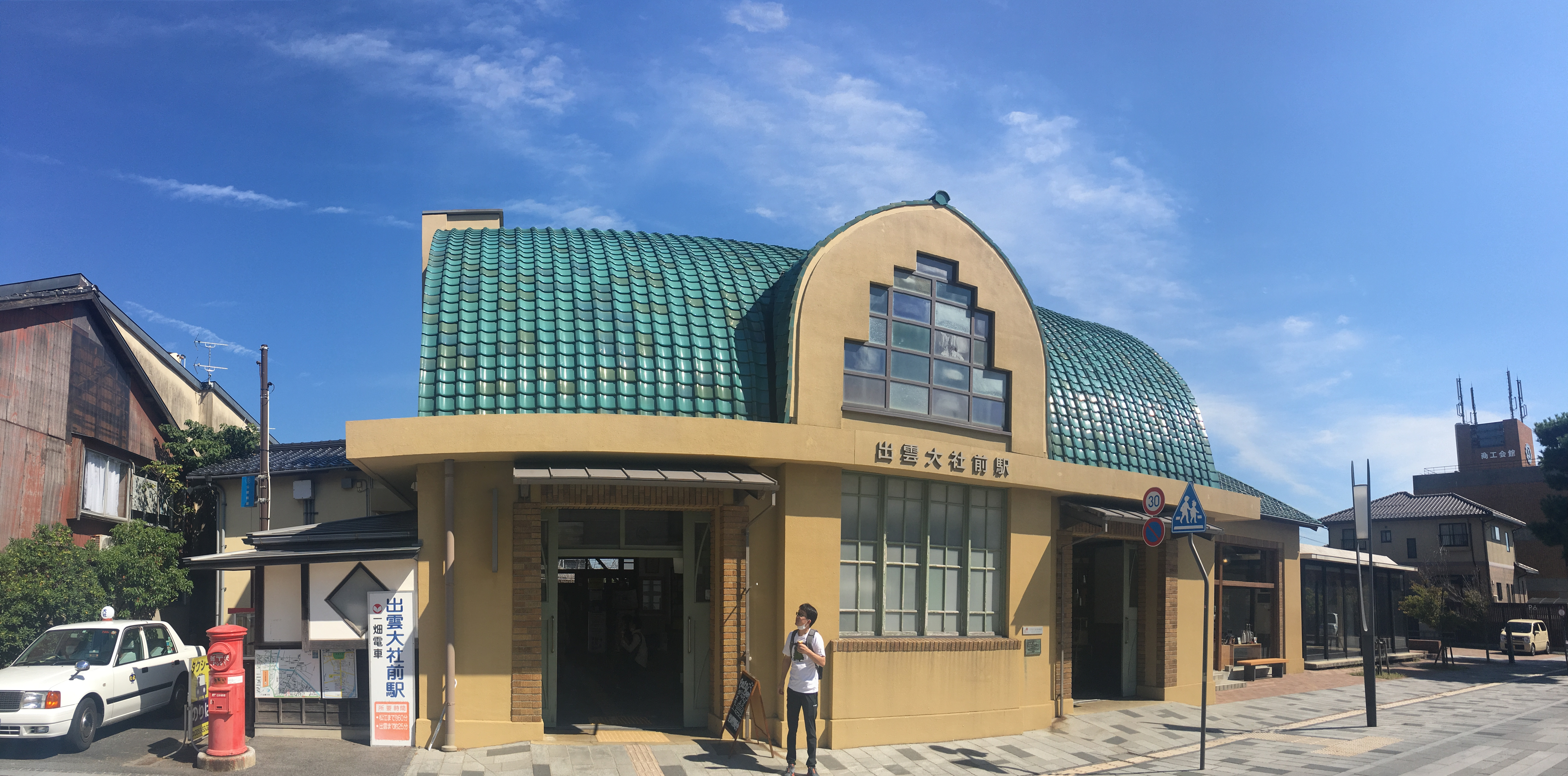
- Izumo Taisha-mae Station, October 2022

General information
- Location: Taishacho Kizukiminami, Izumo-shi, Shimane-ken 699-0711; Japan
- Operator: Ichibata Electric Railway
- Line: ■ Taisha Line
- Distance: 8.3 km (5.2 miles) from Kawato
- Platforms: 1 bay platform
- Tracks: 1

Construction
- Structure type: at grade

Other information
- Status: Unstaffed
- Station code: 23
- Website: Official website

History
- Opened: 2 February 1930
- Former names: Taisha-mae (to 1970)

Passengers
- FY 2019: 803 daily
Location
- Location within Shimane Prefecture Location within Japan

Izumo Taisha-mae Station (出雲大社前駅, Izumo Taisha-mae-eki) is a passenger railway station located in the city of Izumo, Shimane Prefecture, Japan. It is operated by the private transportation company, Ichibata Electric Railway and is the closest train station to the Izumo Taisha Shrine. The station featured as a location setting in the 2008 NHK drama series Dandan (だんだん) and Railways, a film set on the Ichibata Electric Railway line.

== Lines ==
Izumo Taisha-mae Station is the terminus of the Taisha Line, and is located 8.3 kilometers from the opposing terminus of the line at Kawato on the Kita-Matsue Line. This station is served by local and express services. The station is the only rail link between Taisha and Izumo since the closure of the JR Taisha Station and the Taisha Line in 1990.

== Station layout ==
The station consists of one bay platform. The station building was designed in a Western architectural style with striking stained glass windows as a feature. Formerly there was a tower as part of the central building, this has since been removed. The station building was designated as a Registered Tangible Cultural Property in 1996. In 2009, it was certified by the Ministry of Economy, Trade and Industry as an important Heritage of Industrial Modernisation site for its value to the promotion of tourism. The station is staffed.

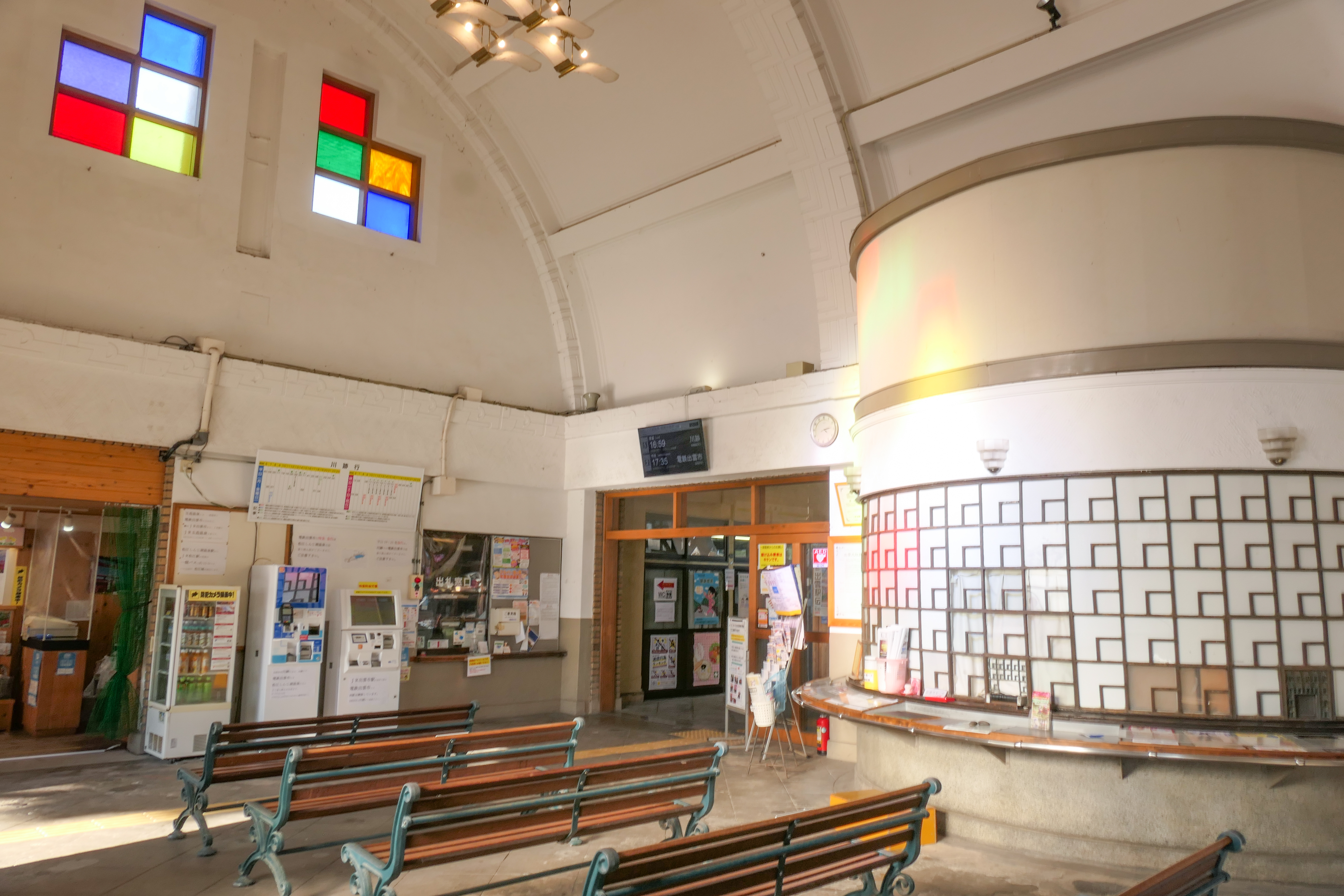
Inside the station building

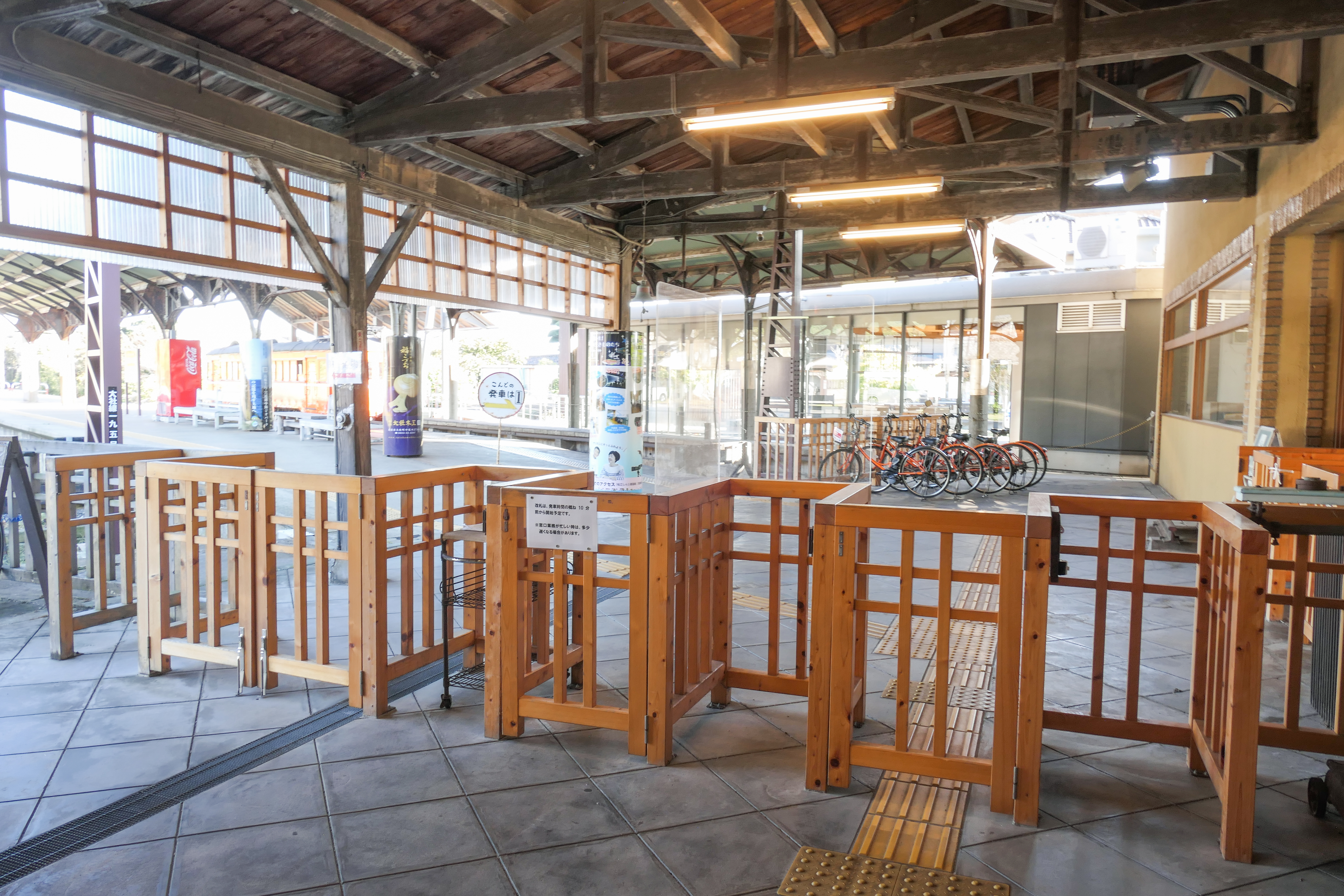
wicket gates

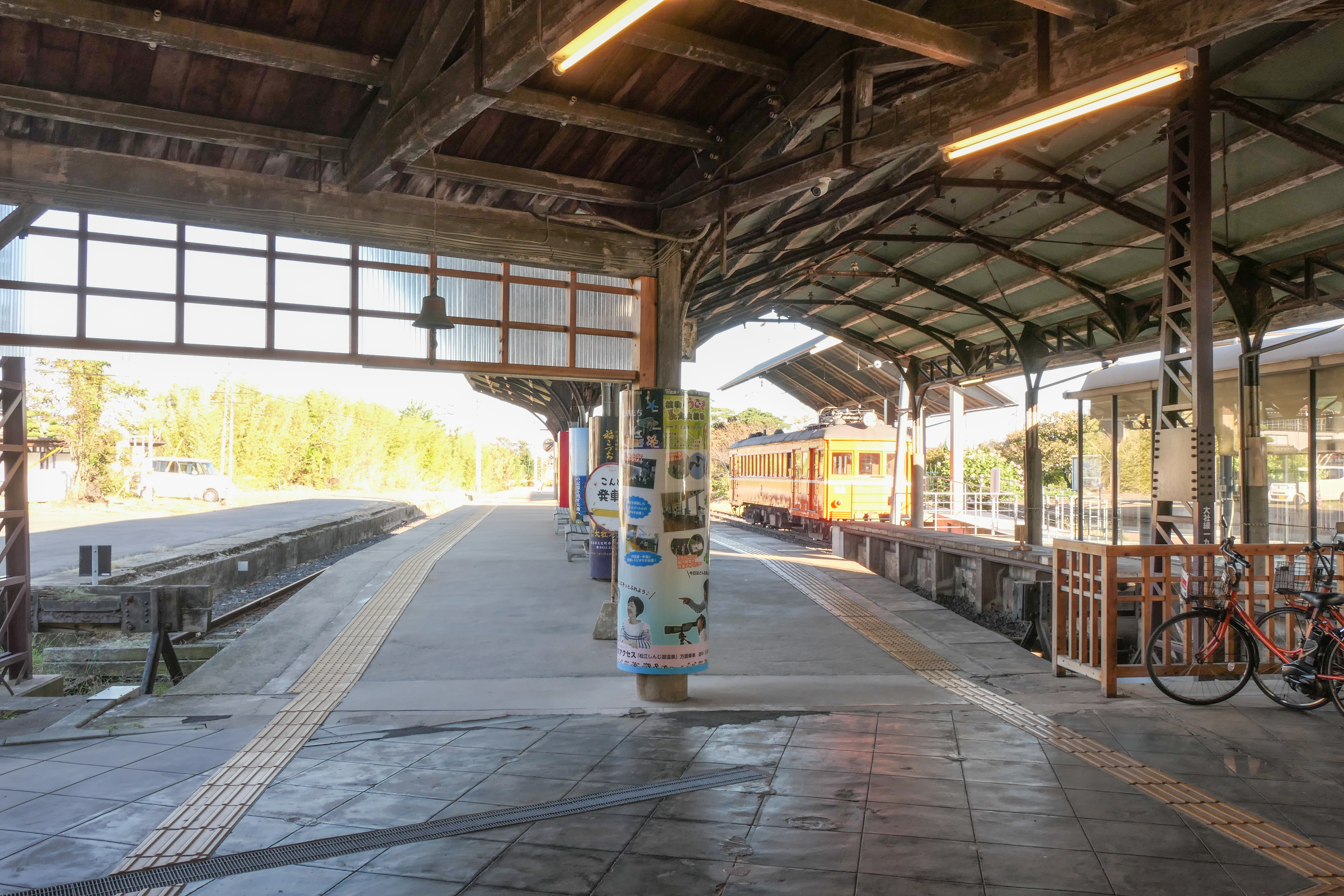
Platforms

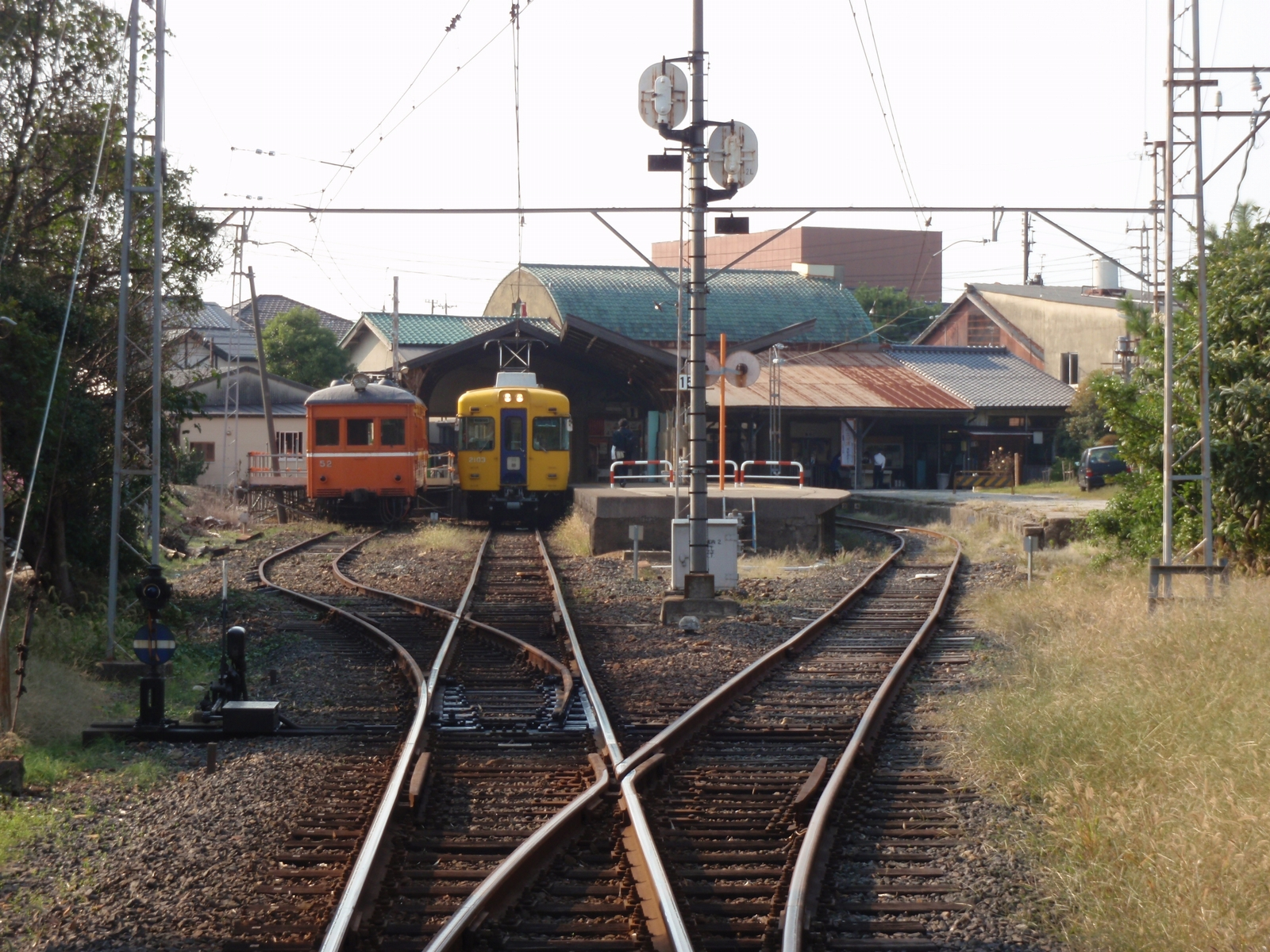
Approach to Izumo Taisha-mae

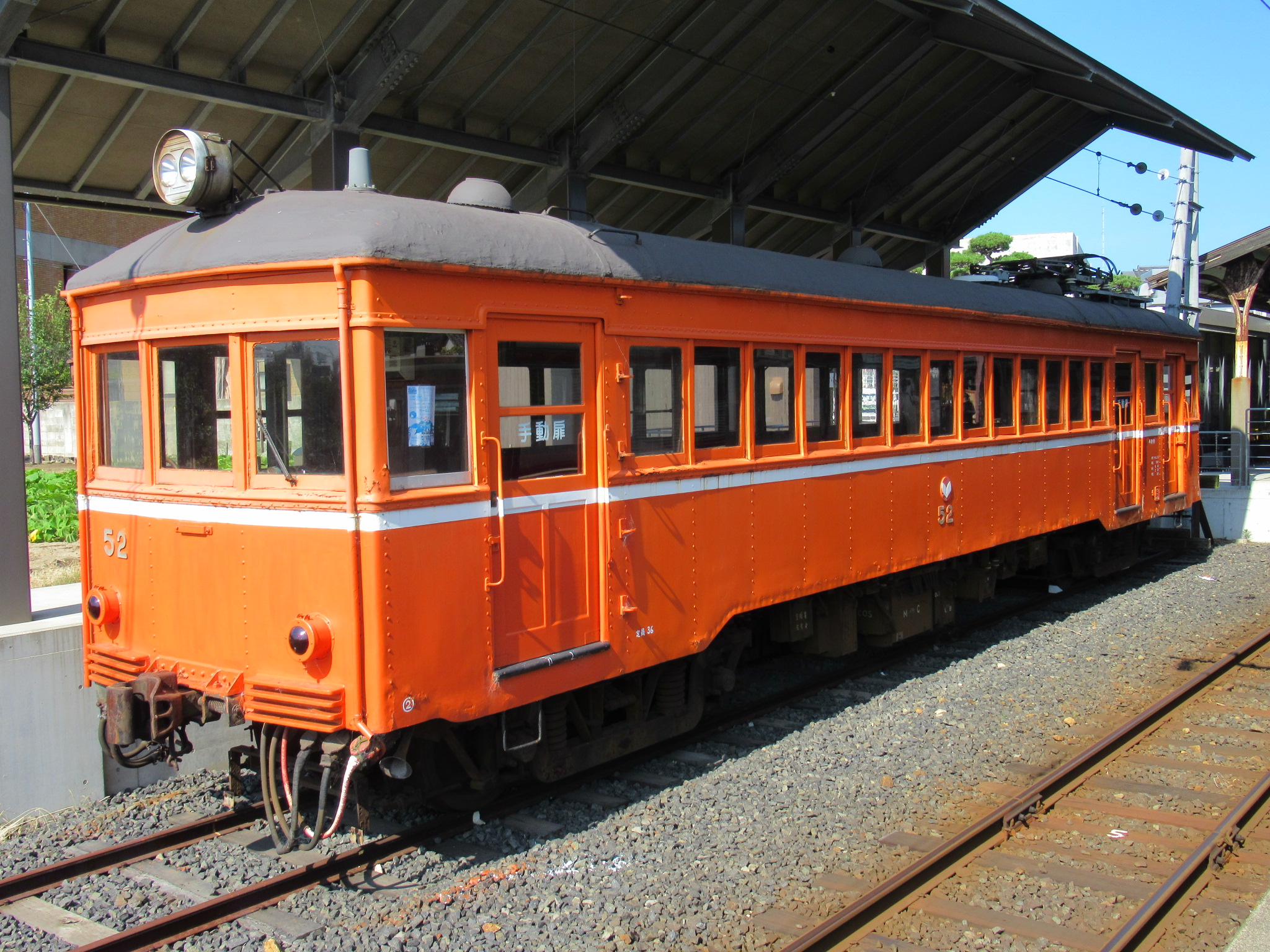
Preserved Dahani 52 carriage

== Adjacent stations ==
«	Service	»
Ichibata Electric Railway
Taisha Line
Hamayamakōen-Kitaguchi	Express	Terminus
Hamayamakōen-Kitaguchi	Local	Terminus

== History ==
Izumo Taisha-mae Station opened on 2 February 1930 as Taisha-mae Station (大社前駅). It was renamed Izumo Taisha-mae in October 1, 1970 (55 years ago).

== Passenger statistics ==
In fiscal 2019, the station was used by an average of 803 passengers daily.

== Surrounding area ==
- Izumo Taisha Shrine
- Takenoya Ryokan, founded in 1877,
- Shimane Museum of Ancient Izumo
- Izumo City Taisha Junior High School

== See also ==
- List of railway stations in Japan
