= Kawato Station =

Railway station in Izumo, Shimane Prefecture, Japan

Kawato Station 川跡駅
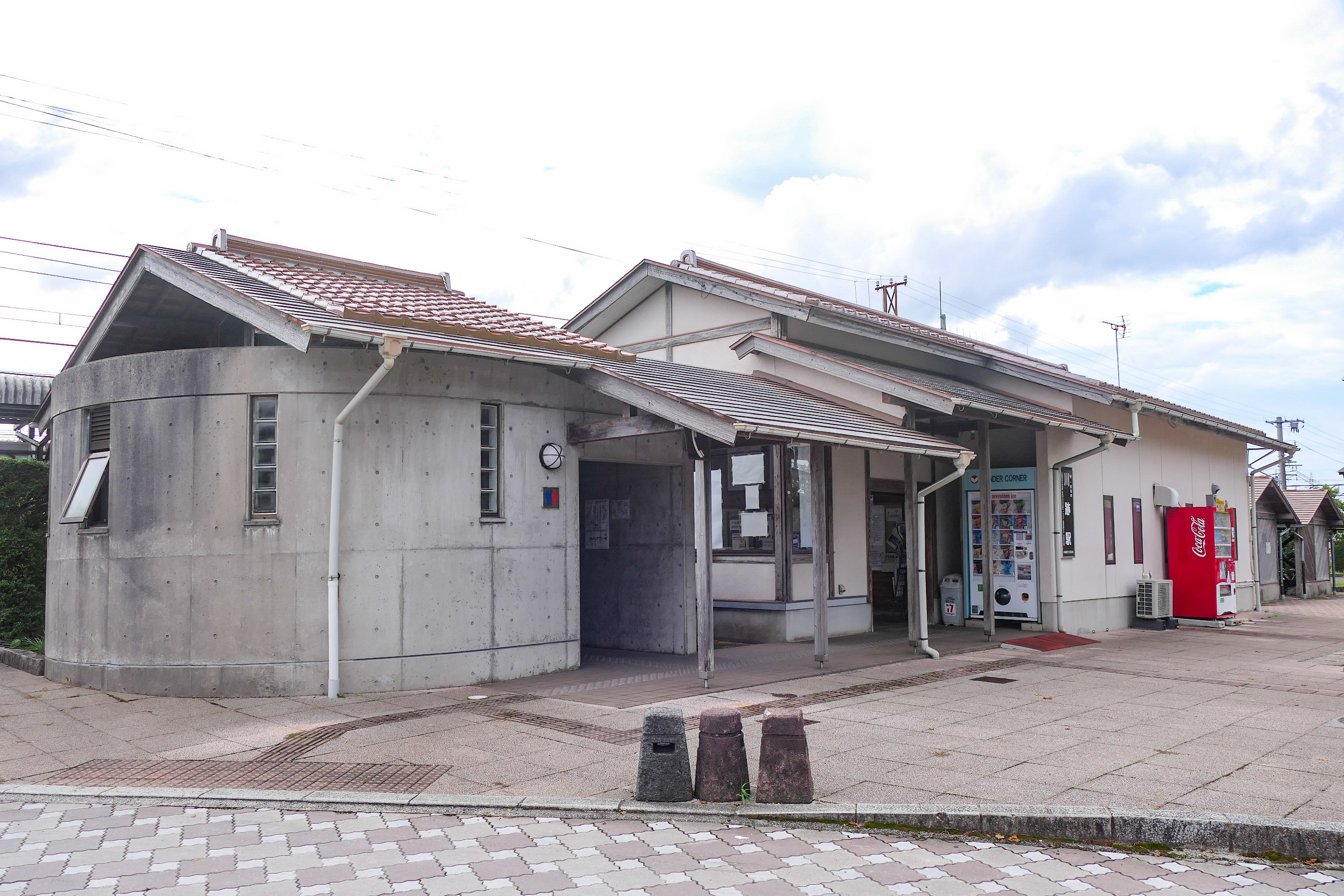
- Kawato Station, September 2025

General information
- Location: 1027-1Takeshi-cho, Izumo-shi, Shimane-ken 693-0014; Japan
- Coordinates: 35°23′42.31″N 132°46′33.69″E
- Operator: Ichibata Electric Railway
- Lines: ■ Kita-Matsue Line; ■ Taisha Line
- Distance: 4.9 km (3.0 miles) from Dentetsu-Izumoshi
- Platforms: 2 island platforms
- Tracks: 4

Construction
- Structure type: at grade

Other information
- Status: Staffed
- Station code: 5
- Website: Official website

History
- Opened: 2 February 1930

Passengers
- FY 2019: 343 daily
Services
Preceding station	Ichibata Electric Railway	Following station
Ōtsumachi towards Dentetsu Izumoshi	Kita-Matsue Line Superliner Express	Unshū-Hirata towards Matsue-Shinjiko-Onsen
Ōtsumachi towards Dentetsu Izumoshi	Kita-Matsue Line Limited Express	through to Taisha Line
through to Taisha Line	Kita-Matsue Line Izumotaisha	Unshū-Hirata towards Matsue-Shinjiko-Onsen
Takeshi towards Dentetsu Izumoshi	Kita-Matsue Line Local	Ōtera towards Matsue-Shinjiko-Onsen
through to Kita-Matsue Line	Taisha Line Limited Express Izumotaisha	Izumo Taisha-mae Terminus
Terminus	Taisha Line Express	Hamayamakōen-Kitaguchi towards Izumo Taisha-mae
Terminus	Taisha Line Local	Takahama towards Izumo Taisha-mae
Location
- Location within Shimane Prefecture Location within Japan

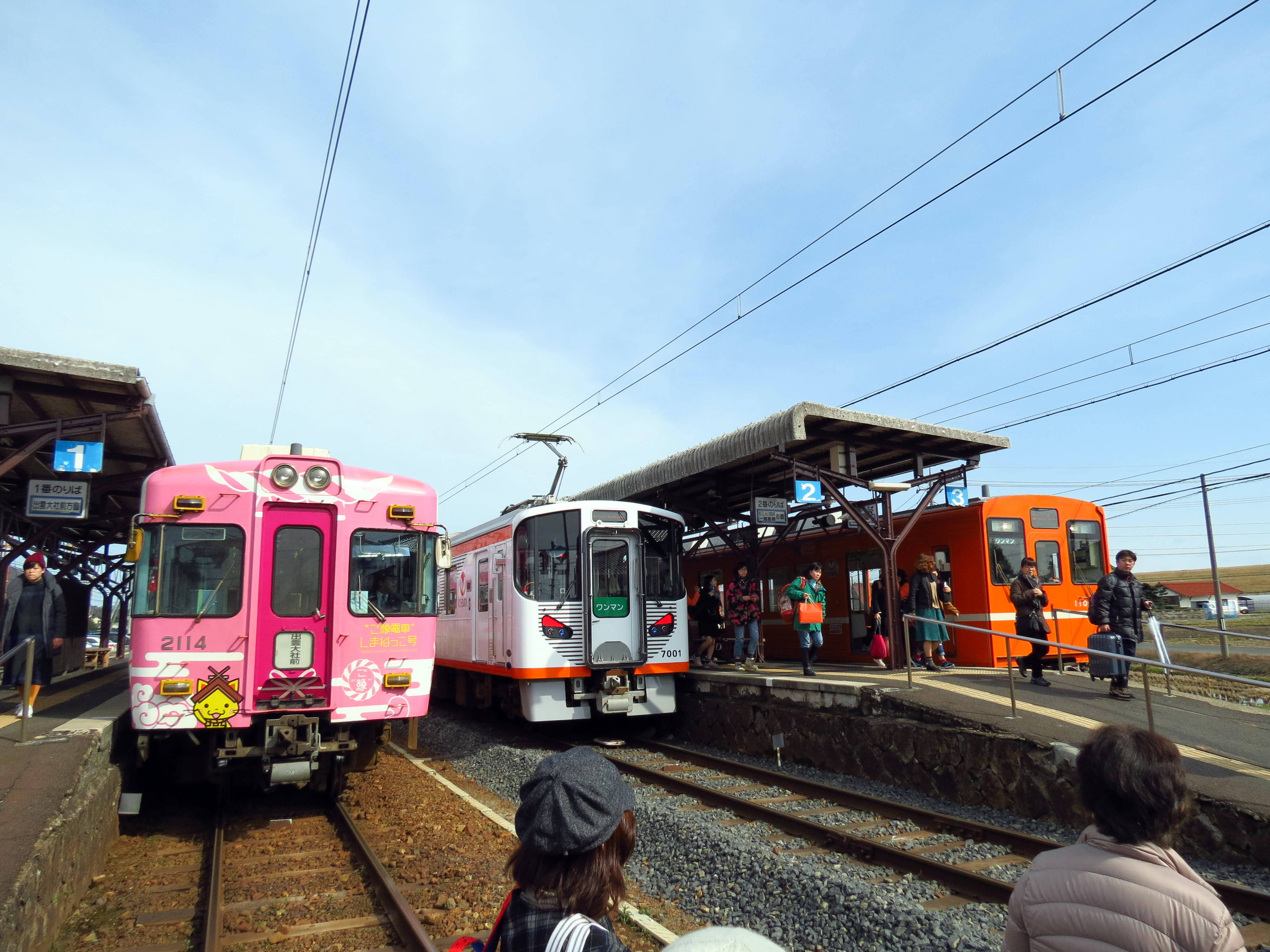
Three trains stopped at Kawato Station

Kawato Station (川跡駅, Kawato-eki) is a junction passenger railway station located in the city of Izumo, Shimane Prefecture, Japan. It is operated by the private transportation company, Ichibata Electric Railway.

== Lines ==
Kawato Station is served by the Kita-Matsue Line, and is located 4.9 kilometers from the terminus of the line at Dentetsu-Izumoshi. It is also the terminus of the 8.3 kilometer Taisha Line to Izumo Taisha-mae. All rail services stop at this station.

== Station layout ==
The station consists of two island platforms connected by level crossings. The old wooden station building was replaced in 1995. The station is staffed.

== Platforms ==
4	■ Taisha Line	not normally in use
1	■ Taisha Line	for Izumo Taisha-mae
2	■ Kita-Matsue Line	for Dentetsu-Izumoshi
3	■ Kita-Matsue Line	for Unshū-Hirata and Matsue-Shinjiko-Onsen

== History ==
Kawato Station was opened on 2 February 1930 with the opening of the Taisha line.

== Passenger statistics ==
In fiscal 2019, the station was used by an average of 434 passengers daily.

== Surrounding area ==
- Shimane Prefectural University Izumo Campus
- Izumo Hokuryo Junior and Senior High School
- Izumo City Hokuyo Elementary School

== See also ==
- List of railway stations in Japan
