= Taisha Line (JR West) =

Former railway line in Shimane, Japan

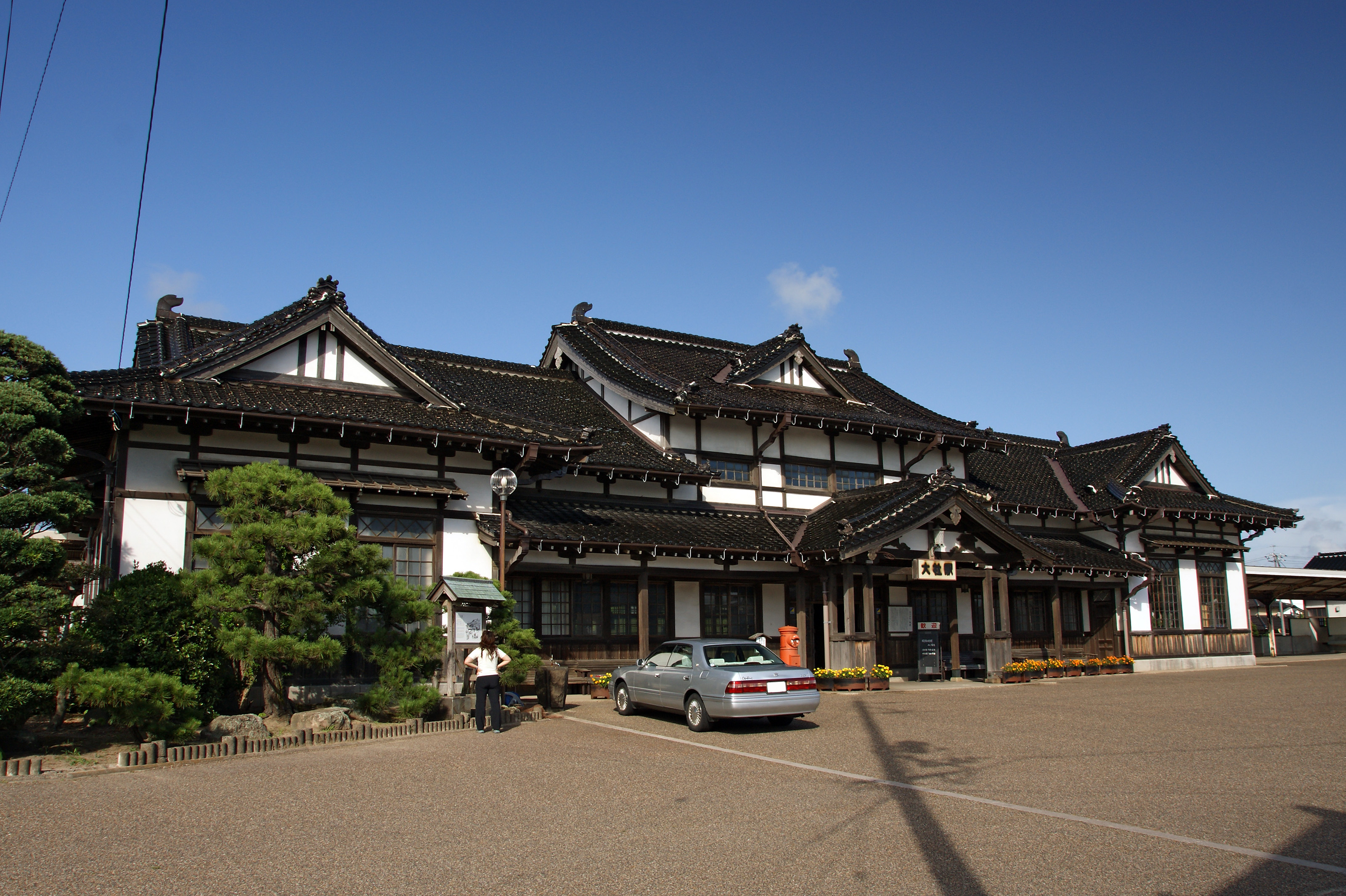
- Preserved Taisha Station building

Overview
- Native name: 大社線
- Status: Ceased operation
- Owner: JR West
- Locale: Shimane
- Termini: Izumoshi; Taisha
- Stations: 4

Service
- Type: Commuter rail line
- Operator(s): JR West

History
- Opened: 28 April 1915; 111 years ago
- Closed: 1 April 1990

Technical
- Line length: 7.5 km (4.7 mi)
- Number of tracks: Entirely Single-tracked
- Character: Rural and urban
- Track gauge: 1,067 mm (3 ft 6 in)
- Electrification: None

The Taisha Line (大社線, Taisha-sen) was a railway line of West Japan Railway Company (JR West) within Izumo, Shimane, Japan. The line closed on April 1, 1990.

== History ==
The line was opened by the Japanese Government Railways in 1912. Freight services ceased in 1974, and the line was closed in 1990, being replaced by a bus service by Ichibata bus. This line, along with Miyazu Line, Kajiya Line being transferred/closed marked the end of all lines in specified local lines.

The former Taisha Station has been preserved and now serves as a museum. It was certified as an Important Cultural Property in 2004. It is the only remaining station of the former JR Taisha Line, the other two having been demolished and built over since the closure of the line. The section between Izumoshi and Arakaya has been turned into a cycling road.

== Stations ==
| Name | | Distance (km) | Connections | Location |
|---|---|---|---|---|
| Izumoshi | 出雲市 | 0.0 | Sanin Main Line | Izumo, Shimane |
| Izumo-Takamatsu | 出雲高松 | 3.5 | | Izumo, Shimane |
| Arakaya | 荒茅 | 5.0 | | Izumo, Shimane |
| Taisha | 大社 | 7.5 | | Izumo, Shimane |

- Tachikue Line operated by Ichibata Electric Railway used to be connected to the line by Izumoshi Station until 1965.

== See also ==
- Izumo Taisha-mae Station
- List of railway lines in Japan
