= Ichibata Electric Railway =

Ichibata Electric Railway Co., Ltd. is the name of two related, yet different companies in Shimane Prefecture, Japan. Ichibata Denki Tetsudō Kabushiki-gaisha (一畑電気鉄道株式会社) was a railway operator until 2006, when it became a holding company of the Ichibata Group, spinning off its railway division to its newly founded Ichibata Densha Kabushiki-gaisha (一畑電車株式会社). Although the two companies have different names in Japanese, in English they are referred to by the English name of their parent holding company.

The company name is often shortened to Bataden.

== Lines ==
- Kita-Matsue Line: 33.9 km (21.1 mi) line between Dentetsu Izumoshi Station and Matsue Shinjiko-Onsen Station
- Taisha Line: 8.3 km (5.2 mi) line between Kawato Station (on Kita-Matsue Line) and Izumo Taisha-mae Station

== Rolling stock ==
- 1000 series: 2-car EMUs converted from former Tokyu 1000 series cars
- 2100 series: 2-car EMUs converted from former Keio 5000 series cars
- 5000 series: 2-car EMUs converted from former Keio 5000 series cars
- 7000 series: Single-car EMUs introduced on 11 December 2016
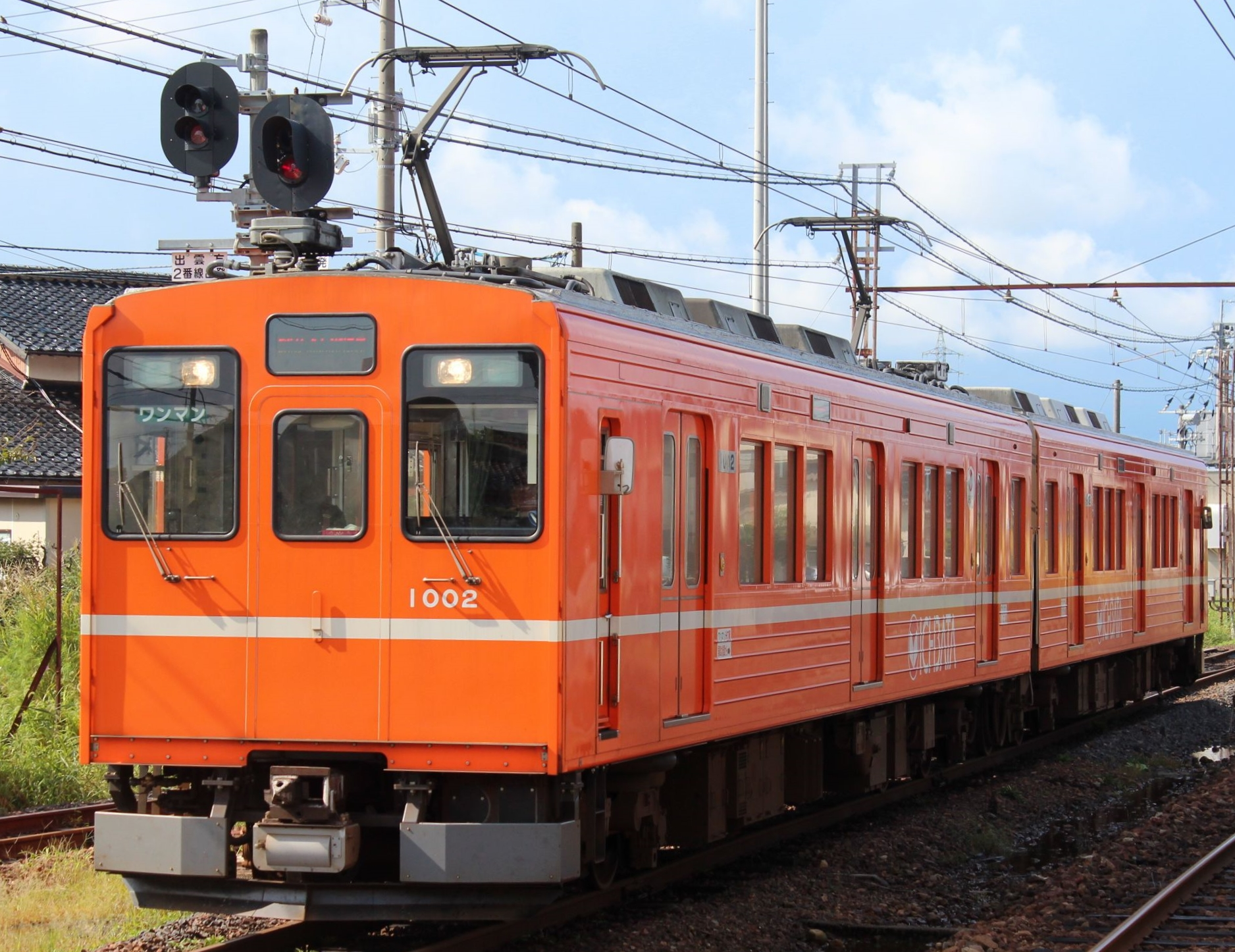
1000 series

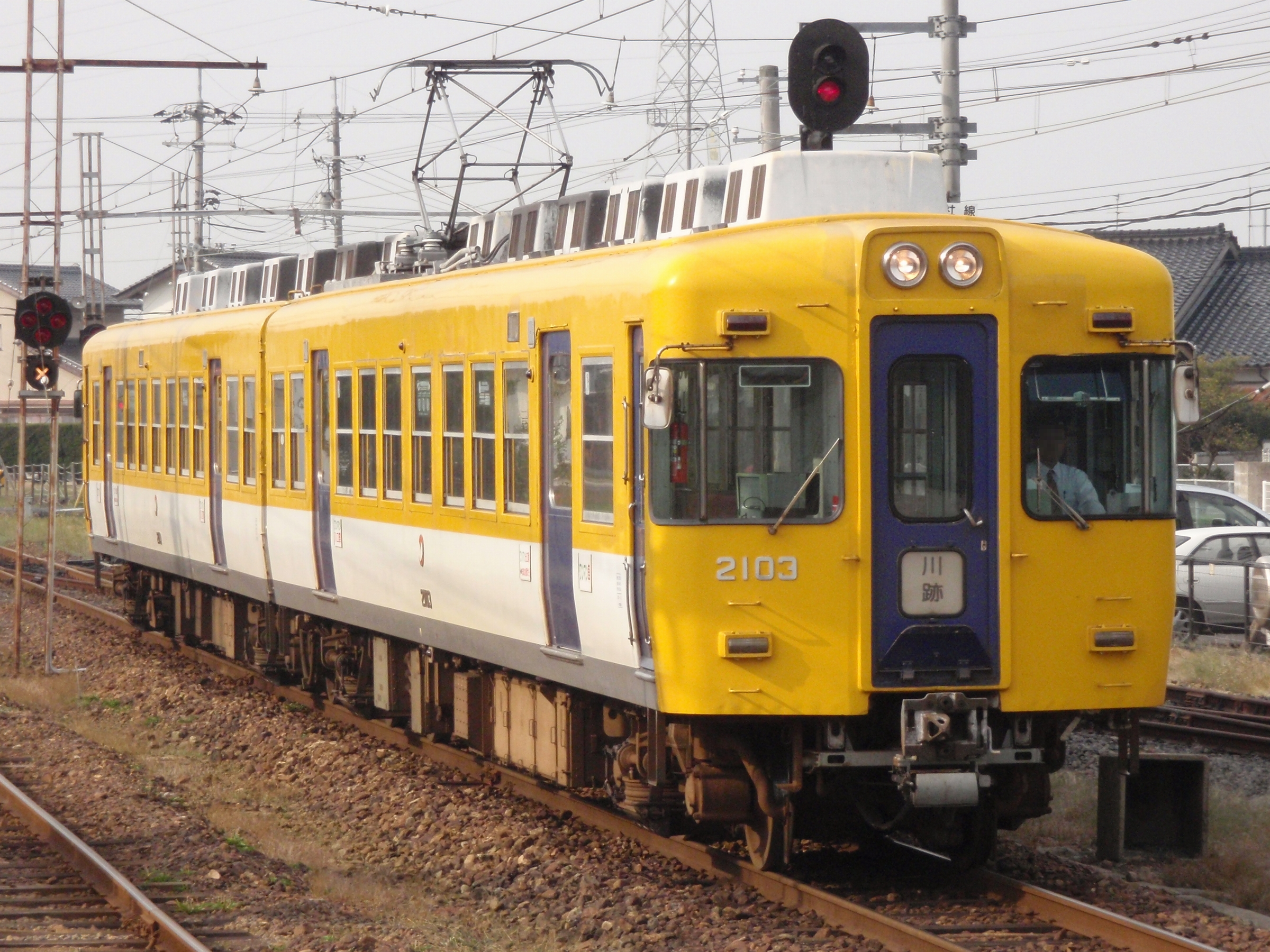
2100 series

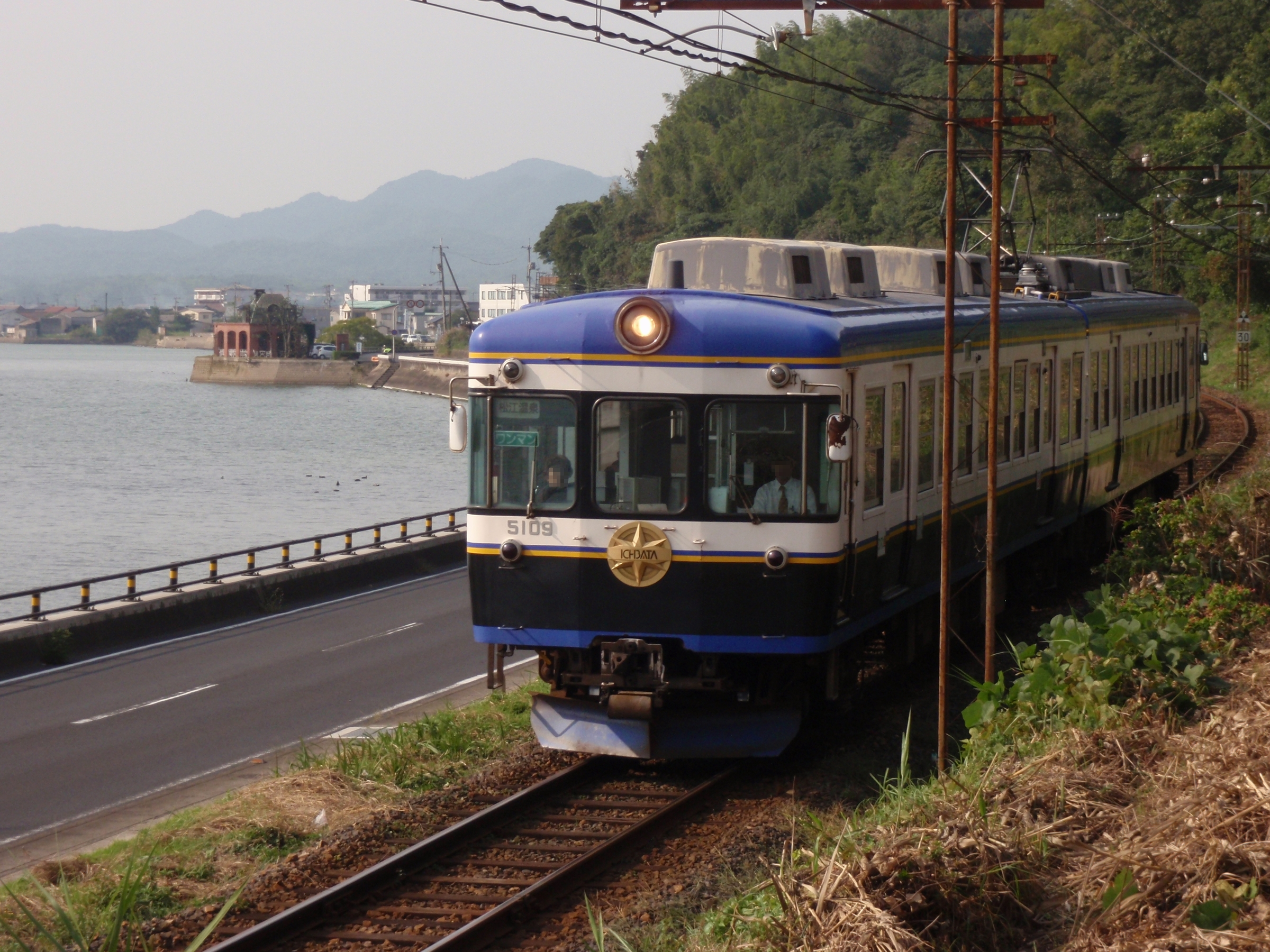
5000 series

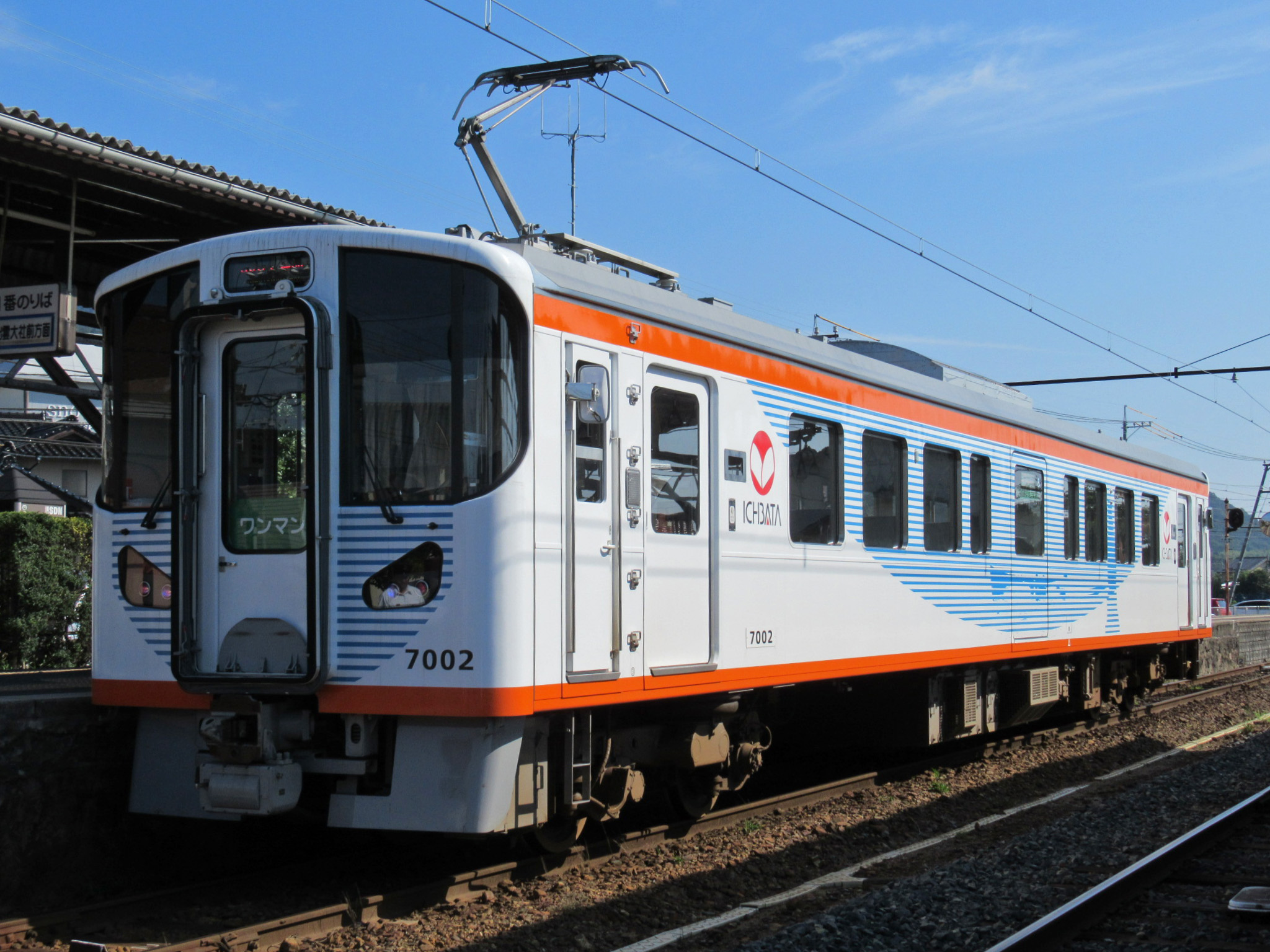
7000 series car 7002 in August 2017

=== 1000 series ===
In 2014, four former Tokyu 1000 series intermediate cars (1453, 1403, 1455, and 1405) were resold to the Ichibata Electric Railway, and reformed as two 2-car 1000 series sets with the addition of new cab ends. These entered service on 9 February 2015.

==== Formations ====
| Designation | Mc | Tc |
| Numbering | DeHa 100x | KuHa 110x |

==== Car identities ====
The former identities of the fleet are as shown below.

| Set No. | Car No. | Tokyu numbering |
|---|---|---|
| 1001 | DeHa 1001 | DeHa 1405 |
| 1001 | KuHa 1101 | DeHa 1455 |
| 1002 | DeHa 1002 | DeHa 1403 |
| 1002 | KuHa 1102 | DeHa 1453 |

=== 7000 series ===
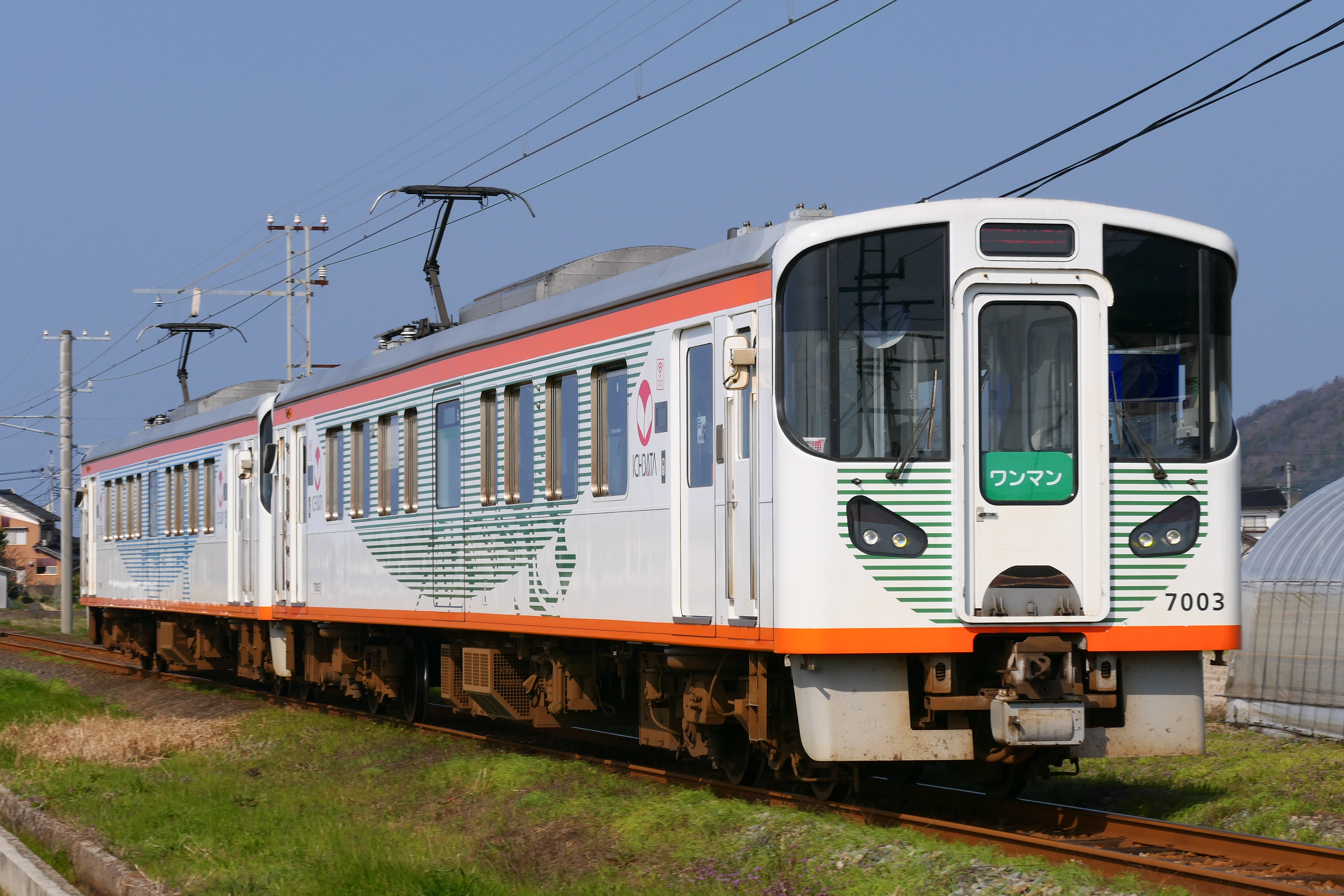
7000 series car 7003 in August 2024

As of 1 April 2017, two 7000 series cars (7001 and 7002) were in operation. While all cars carry the same basic livery of white with orange stripes on the upper and lower body, each car has a different theme and colouring on the ends and body sides.

==== Fleet details ====
| Car No. | Date delivered | Service entry | Theme | Colour |
|---|---|---|---|---|
| 7001 | 23 August 2016 | 11 December 2016 | Izumo Taisha | Black |
| 7002 | 6 February 2017 | 2017 | Lake Shinji | Blue |
| 7003 | 2017 | 14 October 2017 | Rice terraces | Green |
| 7004 | 2018 | 4 March 2018 | Mount Sanbe | Red |

=== Former rolling stock ===
- 3000 series: 2-car EMUs converted from former Nankai 21000 series cars

The last 3000 series set was withdrawn following its final run on 22 January 2017, and scrapped in February 2017.

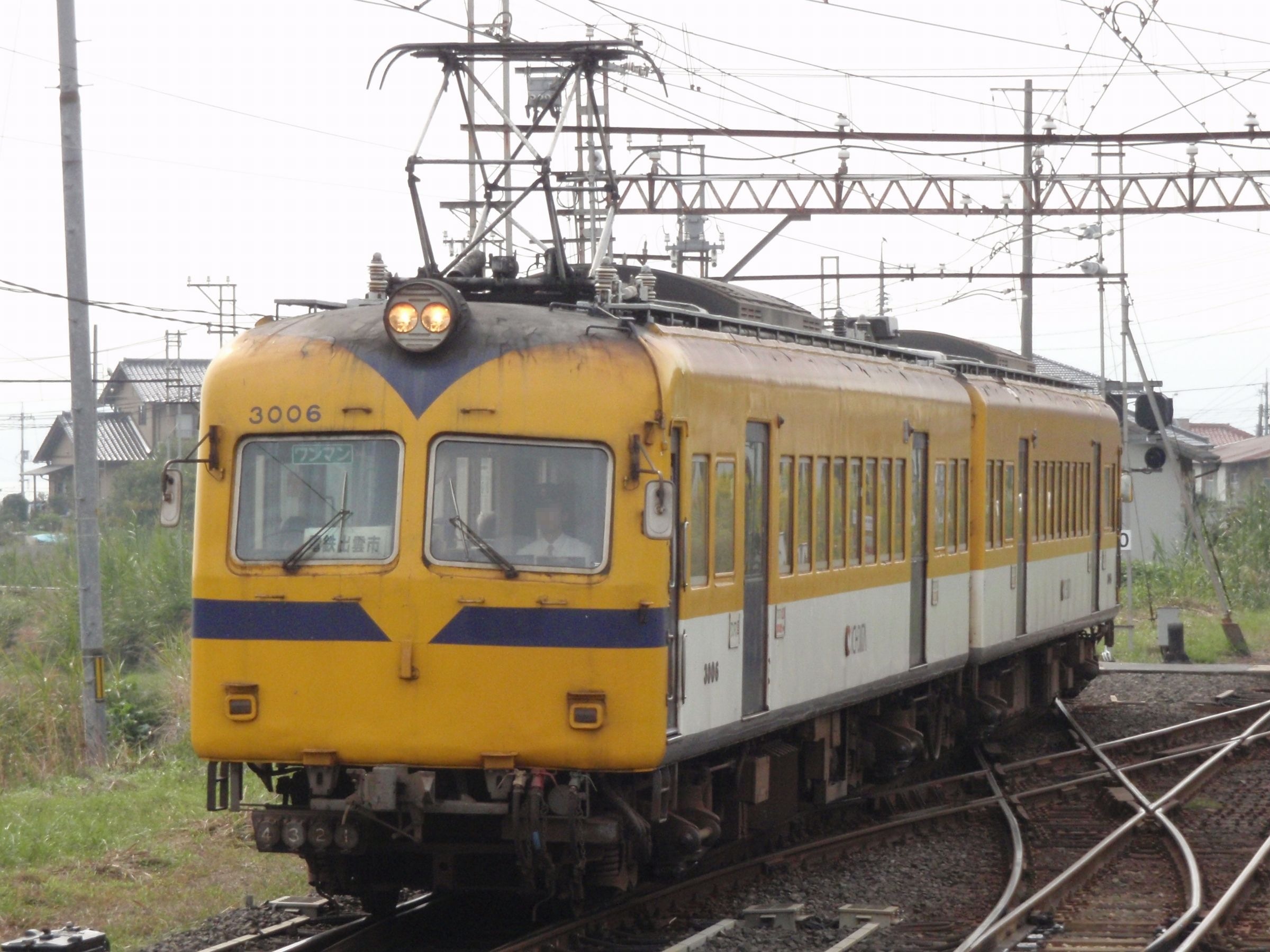
3000 series

== History ==
=== Kita Matsue Line ===
The Ichibata Light Railway (一畑軽便鉄道, Ichibata Keibin Tetsudo) was founded on 6 April 1912. The company opened the line from Izumo Imaichi Station (出雲今市駅, present-day Dentetsu Izumoshi Station) to Unshuhirata on 29 April 1914, with services hauled by steam locomotives. The line was extended to Ichibata Station (later closed) on 4 February 1915.

Electric trains began operating on the line from 1 October 1927, following electrification of the line at 1,500 V DC. The line was extended to the then-named Kita-Matsue Station (北松江駅, present-day Matsue-Shinjiko-Onsen Station) on 5 April 1928.

Driver-only operation commenced on 20 February 1997.

=== Taisha Line ===
The 8.3 km line from Kawato Station (on the Kita-Matsue Line) to Izumo Taisha-mae Station opened in 1930, following its electrification at 1,500 V DC.

== See also ==
- Railways (2010 film), a 2010 Japanese film set on the Ichibata Railway
