= Hikawa =

Hikawa can refer to:

== Places ==
- Hikawa, Kumamoto, a town in Kumamoto, Japan
- Hikawa, Shimane, a former town in Shimane, Japan
- Hikawa District, Shimane, a former district in Shimane, Japan
- Hikawa Shrine, one of two Japanese shrines:
  - Hikawa Shrine (Saitama)
  - Hikawa Shrine (Akasaka)

== Other uses ==
- Hikawa (surname)
- Hikawa Maru class ocean liner of Japan
  - Hikawa Maru, ocean liner launched in 1929 and opened as a museum ship in 2008
