= Koryo =

Koryo may refer to:

== Korea ==
Koryo or Goryeo (Korean: 고려; Hanja: 高麗; RR: Goryeo; MR: Koryŏ) was the name of several states in Korean history, known as Corea or Coree in the western world:

- Goryeo was a state located in northern and central Korean Peninsula and southern and central Manchuria from 37 BC to AD 668. It was founded as Goguryeo and changed its official name to Goryeo in the 5th century.
- Goryeo was a state located in central Korean Peninsula from 901 to 918. It was founded by Gung Ye as Goryeo and changed its official name to Majin in 904 and to Taebong in 911. It is sometimes called Later Goguryeo in historiography.
- Goryeo was a state located in the Korean Peninsula from 918 to 1392. It was founded by Wang Geon and was the successor state of Taebong.
- Korea as a whole

Other topics named after Koryo include:

- Air Koryo, a North Korean airline company
- Koryo Tours, a British travel company specialising in travel, film and cultural exchanges with North Korea
- Koryo, a pumsae ("form") in Taekwondo

== Japan ==
- Kōryō, Nara, a town in Japan, the former capital from 640 to 642
- Koryō, Shimane, a former town in Japan administratively merged into Izumo in 2005
- Koryo Country (also Nayutaya Country), a fictional country introduced in episode 7 of Tsubasa: Reservoir Chronicle, a Japanese manga series

== See also ==
- Goryeo language (disambiguation)
- Koryo-saram ("Koryo people"), the name used by Koreans in the former Soviet Union to refer to themselves as a group
