= Izumo, Shimane =

Izumo 出雲市
- City

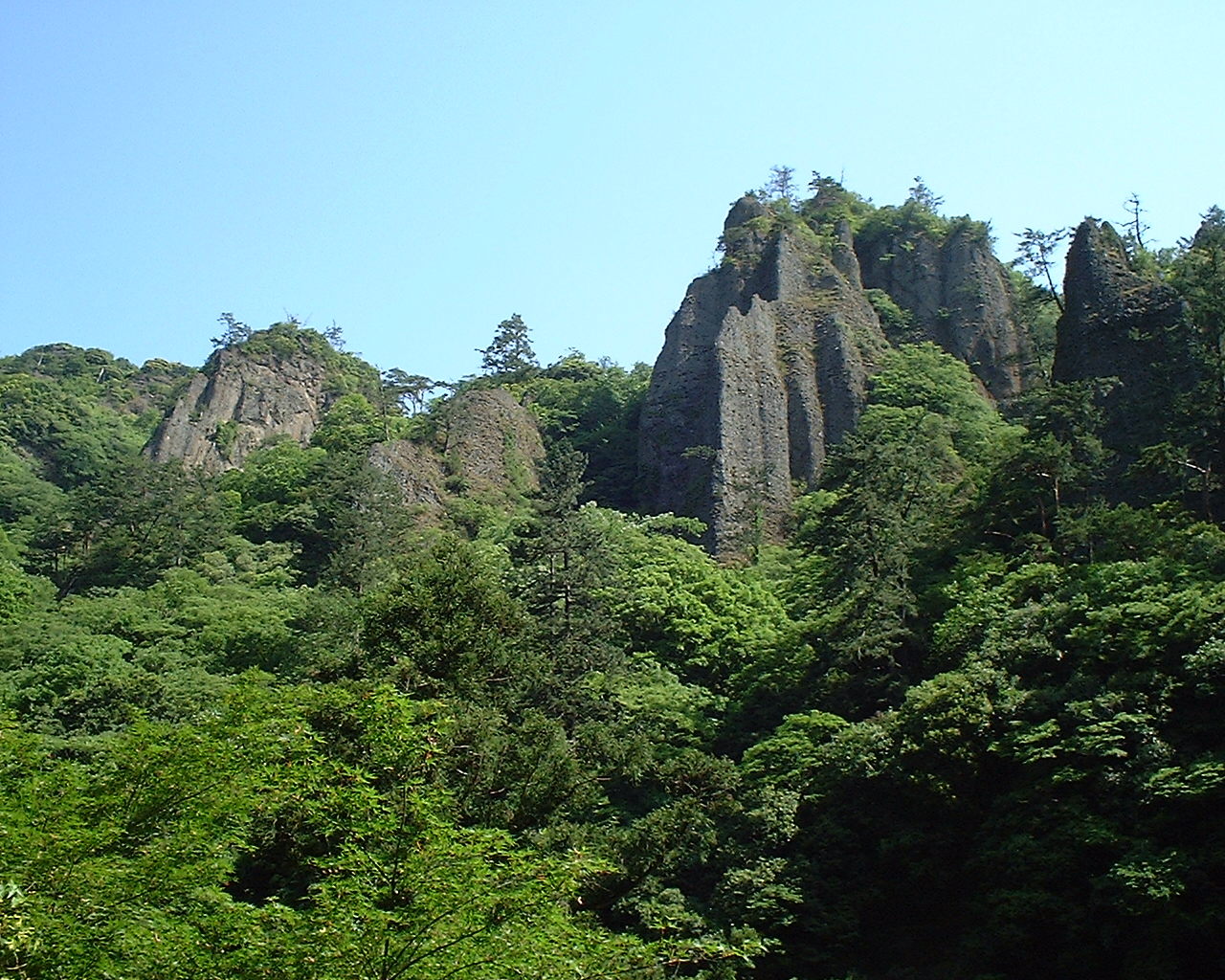

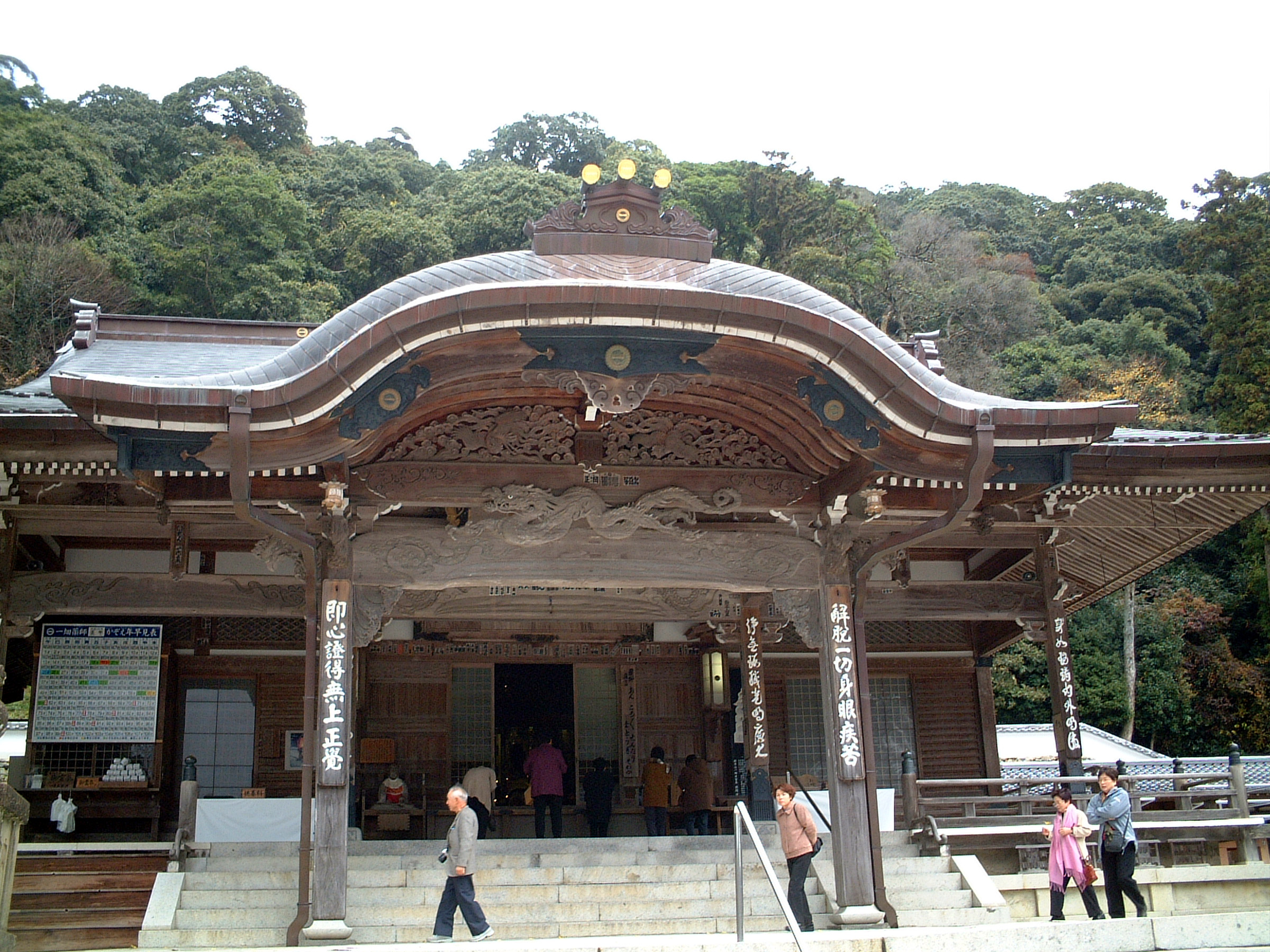

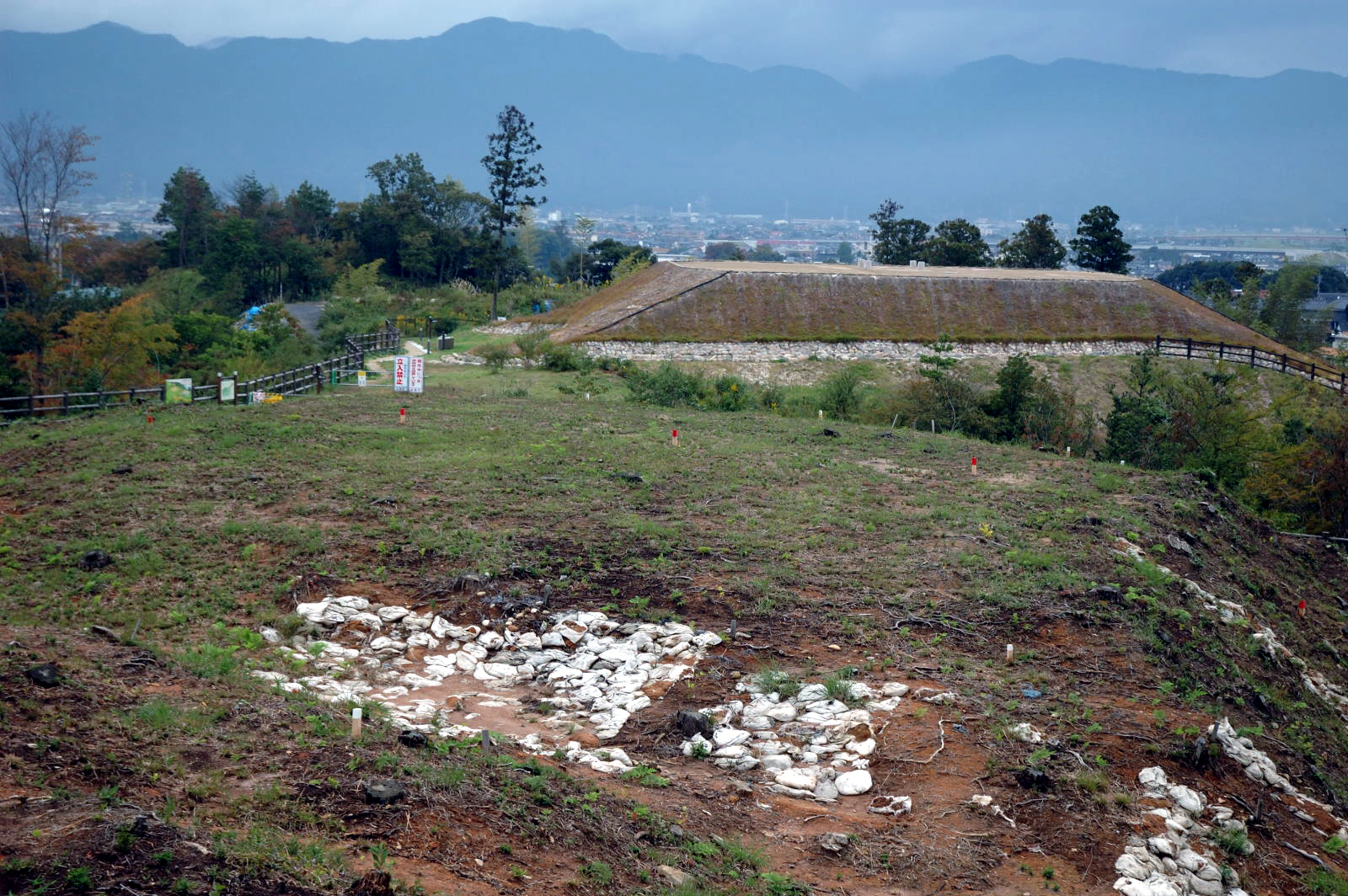
Izumo-taisha
Tachikue Gorge	Ichibata-dera
Inasa Beach	Nishidani tumulus cluster
- Flag Emblem
- Interactive map of Izumo
- Location in Japan
- Coordinates: 35°22′01″N 132°45′17″E
- Country: Japan
- Region: Chūgoku (San'in)
- Prefecture: Shimane

Government
  - Mayor: Toshiyuki Iizuka

Area
  - Total: 624.36 km^{2} (241.07 sq mi)

Population (July 31, 2023)
  - Total: 172,841
  - Density: 276.83/km^{2} (716.98/sq mi)
- Time zone: UTC+09:00 (JST)
- City hall address: 109-1 Imaichichō, Izumo-shi, Shimane-ken 693-8530
- Climate: Cfa
- Website: Official website
- Symbols
- Flower: Chrysanthemum
- Tree: Japanese Black Pine

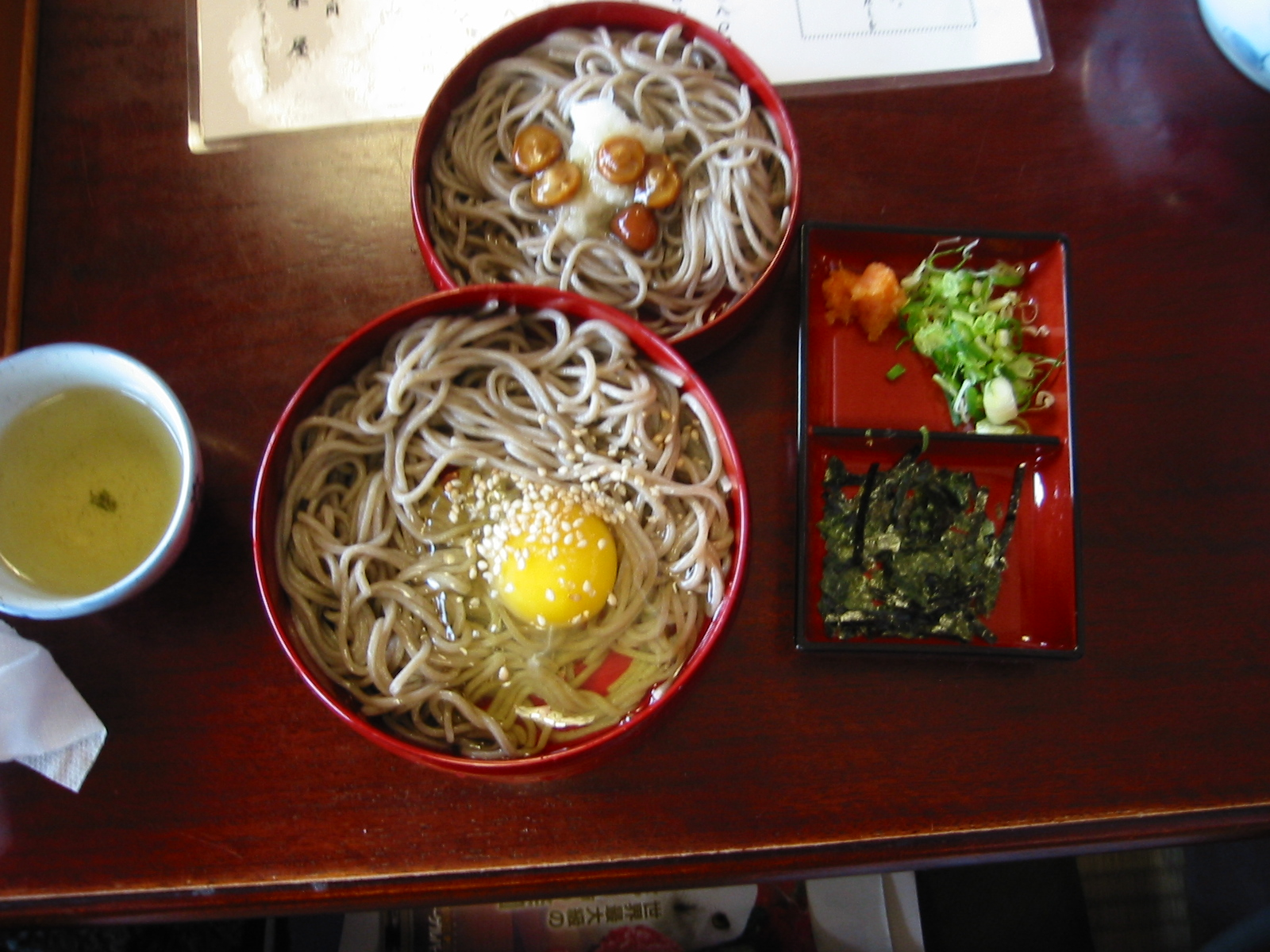
Izumo soba, unique to Izumo

Izumo (出雲市, Izumo-shi; Japanese pronunciation: [í.(d͡)zɨ̀.mò̞, ì.(d͡)zɨ́.mó̞.ɕì]) is a city in Shimane Prefecture, Japan. As of 31 July 2023, the city had an estimated population of 172,841 in 69,435 households and a population density of 280 persons per km^{2}. The total area of the city is 624.36 square kilometers (241.07 sq mi).

== Geography ==
Izumo is located in central eastern of Shimane Prefecture. It has the second largest population in Shimane Prefecture after Matsue, and the third largest population in the San'in region after Matsue and Tottori. Centered on the Izumo Plain, the northern part of the city borders the Shimane Peninsula and the Sea of Japan, and the southern part borders the Chugoku Mountains. The Hii River flows through the eastern part of the city, and it empties into Lake Shinji. The city has a variety of topography, including the sea, mountains, rivers, lakes, plains, canyons, and hot springs.

== Neighboring municipalities ==
Shimane Prefecture

- Iinan
- Matsue
- Ōda
- Unnan

=== Climate ===
Izumo has a humid subtropical climate (Köppen climate classification Cfa) with very warm summers and cool winters. Precipitation is abundant throughout the year. The average annual temperature in Izumo is 14.9 °C (58.8 °F). The average annual rainfall is 1,675.0 mm (65.94 in) with July as the wettest month. The temperatures are highest on average in August, at around 26.4 °C (79.5 °F), and lowest in February, at around 4.8 °C (40.6 °F). The highest temperature ever recorded in Izumo was 38.4 °C (101.1 °F) on 6 August 2017; the coldest temperature ever recorded was −12.5 °C (9.5 °F) on 9 February 2018.

Climate data for Izumo (1991−2020 normals, extremes 1978−present)
Month	Jan	Feb	Mar	Apr	May	Jun	Jul	Aug	Sep	Oct	Nov	Dec	Year
Record high °C (°F)	20.8 (69.4)	22.8 (73.0)	25.8 (78.4)	31.0 (87.8)	31.1 (88.0)	35.4 (95.7)	37.3 (99.1)	38.4 (101.1)	37.4 (99.3)	31.8 (89.2)	27.9 (82.2)	22.8 (73.0)	38.4 (101.1)
Mean daily maximum °C (°F)	8.4 (47.1)	9.3 (48.7)	12.7 (54.9)	18.0 (64.4)	22.8 (73.0)	26.0 (78.8)	29.5 (85.1)	31.3 (88.3)	27.1 (80.8)	22.0 (71.6)	16.5 (61.7)	11.1 (52.0)	19.6 (67.2)
Daily mean °C (°F)	4.8 (40.6)	5.1 (41.2)	7.8 (46.0)	12.6 (54.7)	17.3 (63.1)	21.2 (70.2)	25.3 (77.5)	26.4 (79.5)	22.2 (72.0)	16.7 (62.1)	11.7 (53.1)	7.2 (45.0)	14.9 (58.8)
Mean daily minimum °C (°F)	1.2 (34.2)	0.7 (33.3)	2.5 (36.5)	6.6 (43.9)	11.5 (52.7)	16.7 (62.1)	21.7 (71.1)	22.4 (72.3)	18.0 (64.4)	11.7 (53.1)	6.8 (44.2)	3.1 (37.6)	10.2 (50.5)
Record low °C (°F)	−6.5 (20.3)	−8.4 (16.9)	−4.0 (24.8)	−3.2 (26.2)	1.7 (35.1)	7.4 (45.3)	11.7 (53.1)	15.0 (59.0)	5.5 (41.9)	2.3 (36.1)	−0.9 (30.4)	−3.6 (25.5)	−8.4 (16.9)
Average precipitation mm (inches)	121.6 (4.79)	98.9 (3.89)	123.5 (4.86)	112.2 (4.42)	130.3 (5.13)	183.0 (7.20)	229.8 (9.05)	145.6 (5.73)	187.1 (7.37)	113.4 (4.46)	114.6 (4.51)	135.9 (5.35)	1,675 (65.94)
Average precipitation days (≥ 1.0 mm)	17.3	13.9	12.9	9.9	9.2	10.7	11.7	9.3	11.3	10.0	12.1	16.9	145.2
Mean monthly sunshine hours	53.9	80.3	140.4	186.1	208.8	164.2	178.5	207.9	152.5	155.3	107.3	65.4	1,697.4
Source: Japan Meteorological Agency

Climate data for Hikawa, Izumo (2003−2020 normals, extremes 2003−present)
Month	Jan	Feb	Mar	Apr	May	Jun	Jul	Aug	Sep	Oct	Nov	Dec	Year
Record high °C (°F)	18.0 (64.4)	23.0 (73.4)	26.3 (79.3)	28.9 (84.0)	31.7 (89.1)	34.3 (93.7)	37.4 (99.3)	37.9 (100.2)	36.2 (97.2)	31.9 (89.4)	27.4 (81.3)	23.5 (74.3)	37.9 (100.2)
Mean daily maximum °C (°F)	8.1 (46.6)	9.3 (48.7)	12.8 (55.0)	18.1 (64.6)	23.2 (73.8)	26.3 (79.3)	29.7 (85.5)	31.6 (88.9)	27.3 (81.1)	22.0 (71.6)	16.7 (62.1)	10.6 (51.1)	19.6 (67.4)
Daily mean °C (°F)	4.4 (39.9)	5.1 (41.2)	8.0 (46.4)	12.8 (55.0)	17.9 (64.2)	21.8 (71.2)	25.7 (78.3)	27.1 (80.8)	22.9 (73.2)	17.2 (63.0)	11.9 (53.4)	6.7 (44.1)	15.1 (59.2)
Mean daily minimum °C (°F)	1.0 (33.8)	1.0 (33.8)	2.9 (37.2)	7.3 (45.1)	12.9 (55.2)	18.0 (64.4)	22.5 (72.5)	23.4 (74.1)	19.1 (66.4)	12.5 (54.5)	7.3 (45.1)	3.0 (37.4)	10.9 (51.6)
Record low °C (°F)	−6.1 (21.0)	−12.5 (9.5)	−3.5 (25.7)	−0.9 (30.4)	4.6 (40.3)	9.7 (49.5)	15.8 (60.4)	16.5 (61.7)	11.0 (51.8)	4.5 (40.1)	−0.3 (31.5)	−3.1 (26.4)	−12.5 (9.5)
Average precipitation mm (inches)	120.5 (4.74)	93.1 (3.67)	118.8 (4.68)	118.1 (4.65)	126.4 (4.98)	155.7 (6.13)	241.0 (9.49)	143.9 (5.67)	183.7 (7.23)	121.1 (4.77)	112.2 (4.42)	148.9 (5.86)	1,690.8 (66.57)
Average precipitation days (≥ 1.0 mm)	16.7	12.9	12.9	10.3	9.1	10.1	11.9	9.6	11.3	10.1	12.6	17.5	145
Source: Japan Meteorological Agency

=== Demographics ===
Historical population
Year	Pop.	±%
1950	174,464	—
1955	175,419	+0.5%
1960	168,724	−3.8%
1965	161,790	−4.1%
1970	157,325	−2.8%
1975	159,058	+1.1%
1980	166,280	+4.5%
1985	170,529	+2.6%
1990	171,422	+0.5%
1995	172,001	+0.3%
2000	173,776	+1.0%
2005	173,751	−0.0%
2010	171,523	−1.3%
2015	171,938	+0.2%
2020	172,775	+0.5%
Izumo population statistics

== History ==
The area of Izumo was part of the ancient Izumo Province and has been inhabited since prehistoric times. In 2009, a team of archaeologists announced that they likely discovered—at the Sunabara Site in Taki-chō, Izumo—the oldest stone tools ever found in Japan. The find totaled about 20 tools dating back an estimated 120,000 years: about 80,000 years earlier than previous estimates of when the first humans arrived in the Japanese archipelago. Later, this date was revised to 70,000 years before present upon the discovery of a layer of volcanic ash also dated 70,000 years before present. A powerful ancient kingdom developed in the fertile Izumo Plain from the Yayoi period, as evidenced by the area's rich mythology, ruins, large amount of excavated items, and a wide variety of ancient tombs. The Izumo area is also rich in Kofun period burial mounds. The Imaichi Dainenji Kofun is believed to have been constructed in the 6th century with highly sophisticated construction methods for the time and with an overall length of 100 meters is the largest in the Izumo region

During the Sengoku period, Izumo was the stronghold of the Amago clan, until their defeat by the Mōri clan. Under the Edo Period Tokugawa shogunate, the area came largely under the control of Matsue Domain. Following the Meiji restoration, the town of Imaichi was established with the creation of the modern municipalities system on April 1, 1889. Imaichi merged with eight surrounding villages to form the town of Izumo on February 11, 1941. Izumo was raised to city status less than 9 months later, on November 3, 1941.

On March 22, 2005, Izumo absorbed the city of Hirata, and the towns of Koryō, Sada, Taisha and Taki (all from Hikawa District) to create the new and expanded city of Izumo.

On October 1, 2011, the town of Hikawa (also from Hikawa District) was also merged into the new Izumo. Hikawa District was dissolved as a result of this merger.

== Government ==
Izumo has a mayor-council form of government with a directly elected mayor and a unicameral city council of 30 members. Izumo contributes nine members to the Shimane Prefectural Assembly. In terms of national politics, the city is part of the Shimane 2nd district of the lower house of the Diet of Japan.

== Economy ==
The main industries in are agriculture and commercial fishing. Izumo is also a major tourist destination within the San'in region.

== Education ==
Izumo has 36 public elementary school and 14 public junior high schools operated by the city government, and six public high schools operated by the Shimane Prefectural Board of Education. There are also two private high schools, and the prefecture operates one special education school for the handicapped.

== Transportation ==
=== Airport ===
- Izumo Airport

=== Railway ===
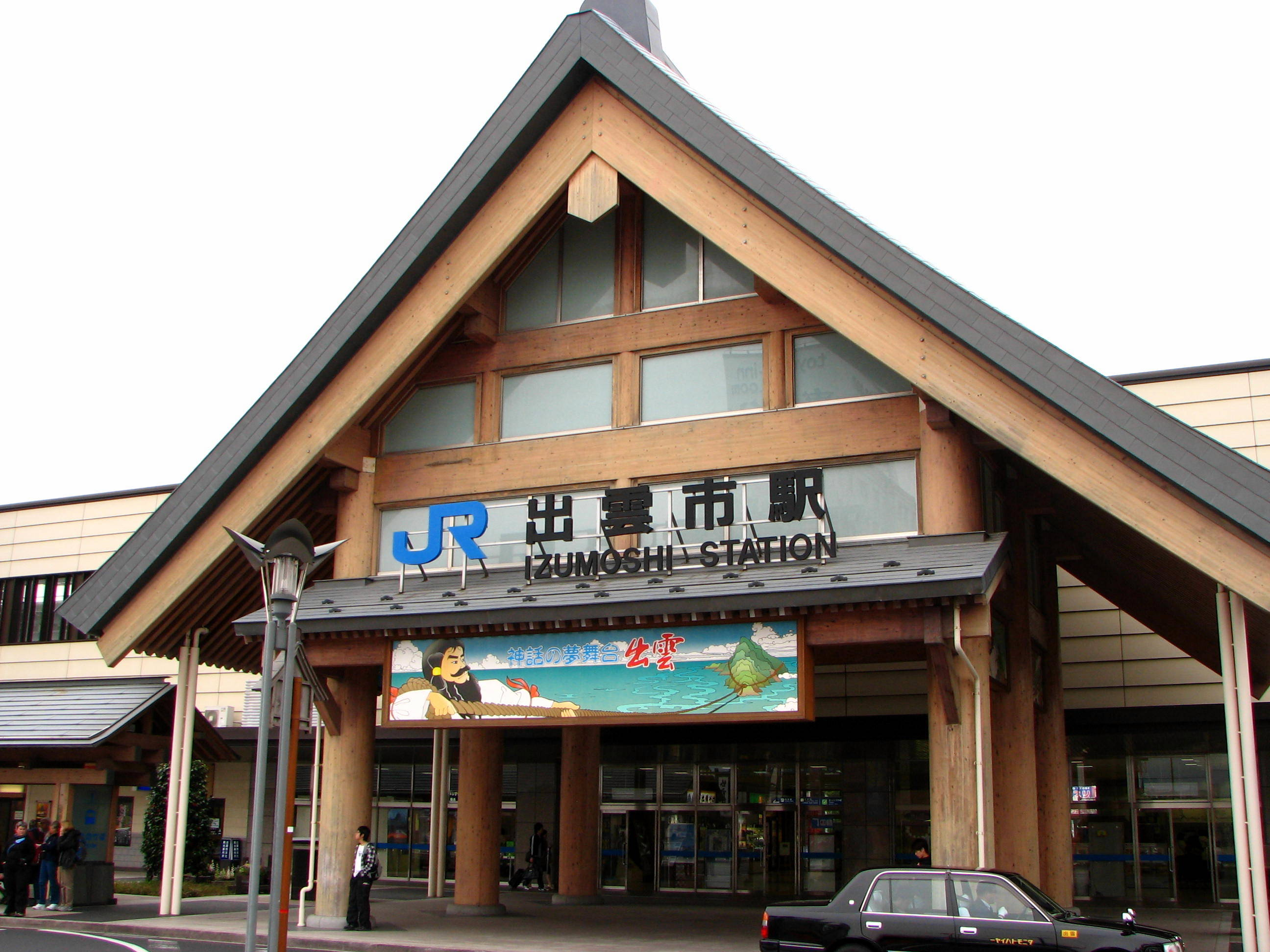
Izumo-shi Station

JR West (JR West) - San'in Main Line

- Tagi - Oda - Kōnan - Izumo-Jinzai - Nishi-Izumo - Izumoshi - Naoe - Shōbara

Ichibata Electric Railway (Bataden) - Kita-Matsue Line

- Dentetsu-Izumoshi - Izumo Science Center Park Town Mae - Ōtsumachi - Takeshi - Kawato - Ōtera - Midami - Tabushi - Unshū-Hirata - Nunozaki - Koyūkan-Shineki - Sono - Ichibataguchi - Inonada

Ichibata Electric Railway (Bataden) - Taisha Line

- Kawato - Takahama - Yōkan - Hamayamakōen-Kitaguchi - Izumo Taisha-mae

=== Highways ===
- San'in Expressway
- National Route 9
- National Route 184
- National Route 431

== Sister cities ==
Izumo has a town twinning relationship with the following cities.

- Santa Clara, California, United States, since 1986
- Hanzhong, China, since 1996
- Évian-les-Bains, France, since 2002
- Kalajoki, Finland, since 2003
- (Republic of Ireland) Dún Laoghaire, Ireland, since 2008

== Local attractions ==
- Izumo Taisha is the oldest Shinto shrine in Japan. In 2008, the area was open to the public from 1 August until August 17, after which extensive renovation work began. The nearby Shimane Museum of Ancient Izumo, also located in Taisha Machi, has artifacts from the site.
- Izumo Dome is a venue located just north of the city proper. It has the distinction of being Japan's largest wooden building, at 49 metres high and 143 metres in diameter. It is used for sports and events such as baseball games and soccer matches, as well as for other events including sumo. It is a prominent symbol of Izumo, and can be seen from a distance from the train passing towards Hamada.
- Hinomisaki Lighthouse (日御碕灯台, Hinomisaki tōdai) is a modern stone lighthouse with a powerful lamp. From the tower, one can see the Oki Islands, from where the story of the "white rabbit" comes.
- Shimane Winery is known for its super-sweet wines.
- "Kirara Taki" Beach is located in Taki (多伎町), one of the towns merged into Izumo in 2005. The beach has clean water and off-shore stacks of concrete tetrapods to break the waves. Nearby is an onsen called Marine Thalasso Izumo.
- The Okuizumo Museum of Tatara and Sword-making features demonstrations twice a month, switching off every two weeks: one demonstration shows smithing techniques, while the other is a usage demonstration.
- The Izumo Handicraft Museum is set in a traditional Japanese workshop complex.
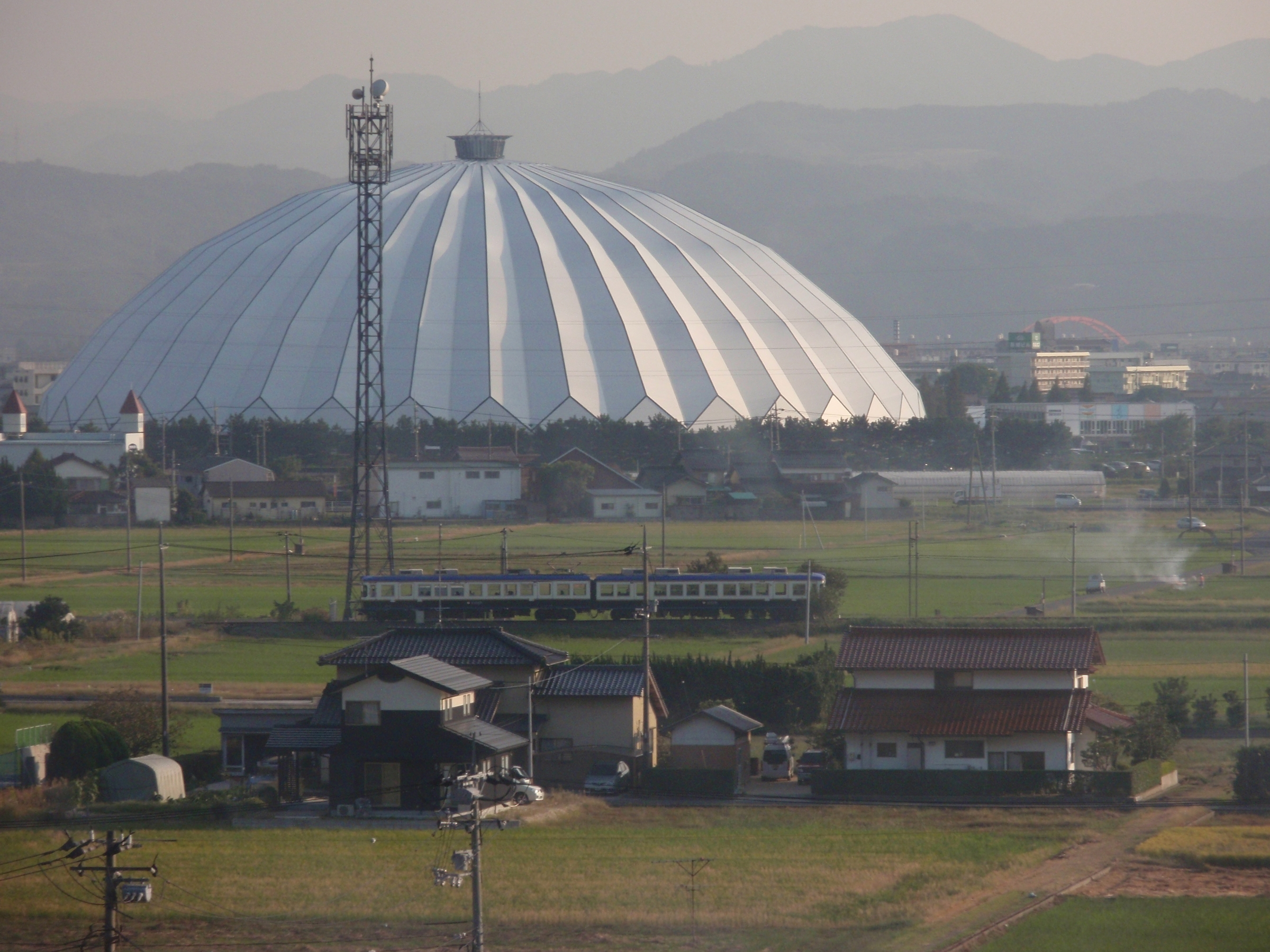
Izumo Dome

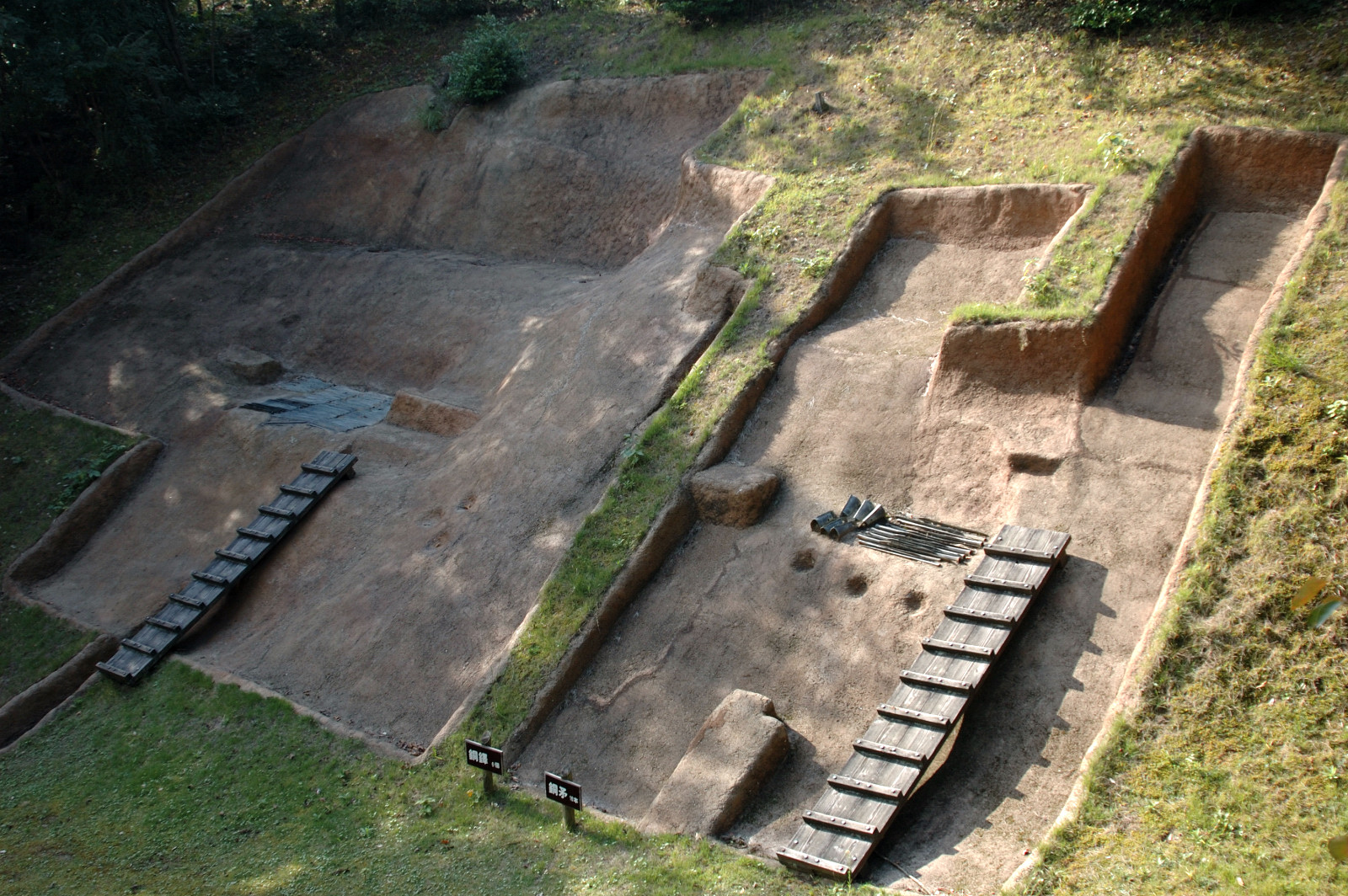
Kojindani archaeological site

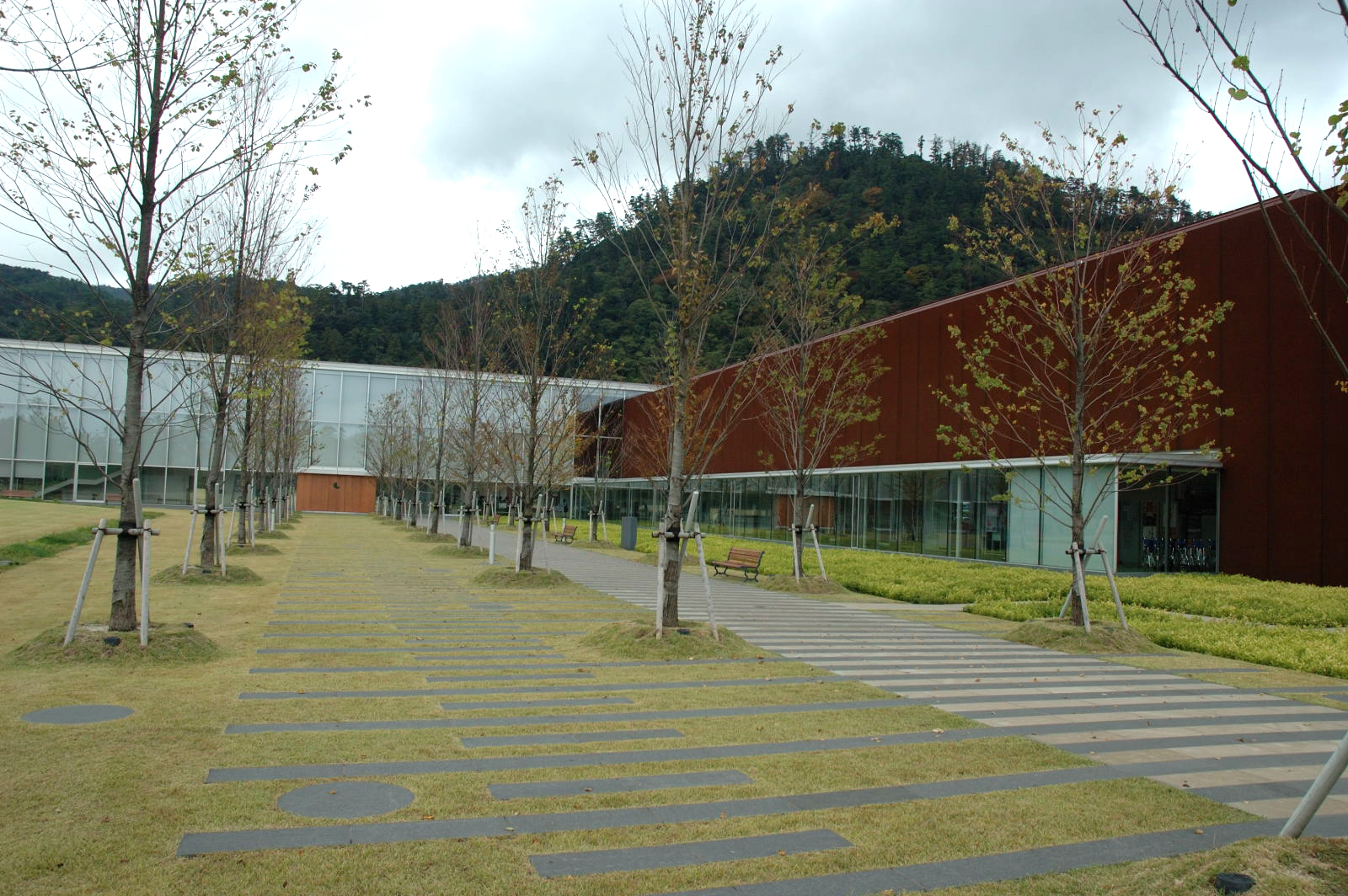
Shimane Prefectural Izumo Ancient Museum

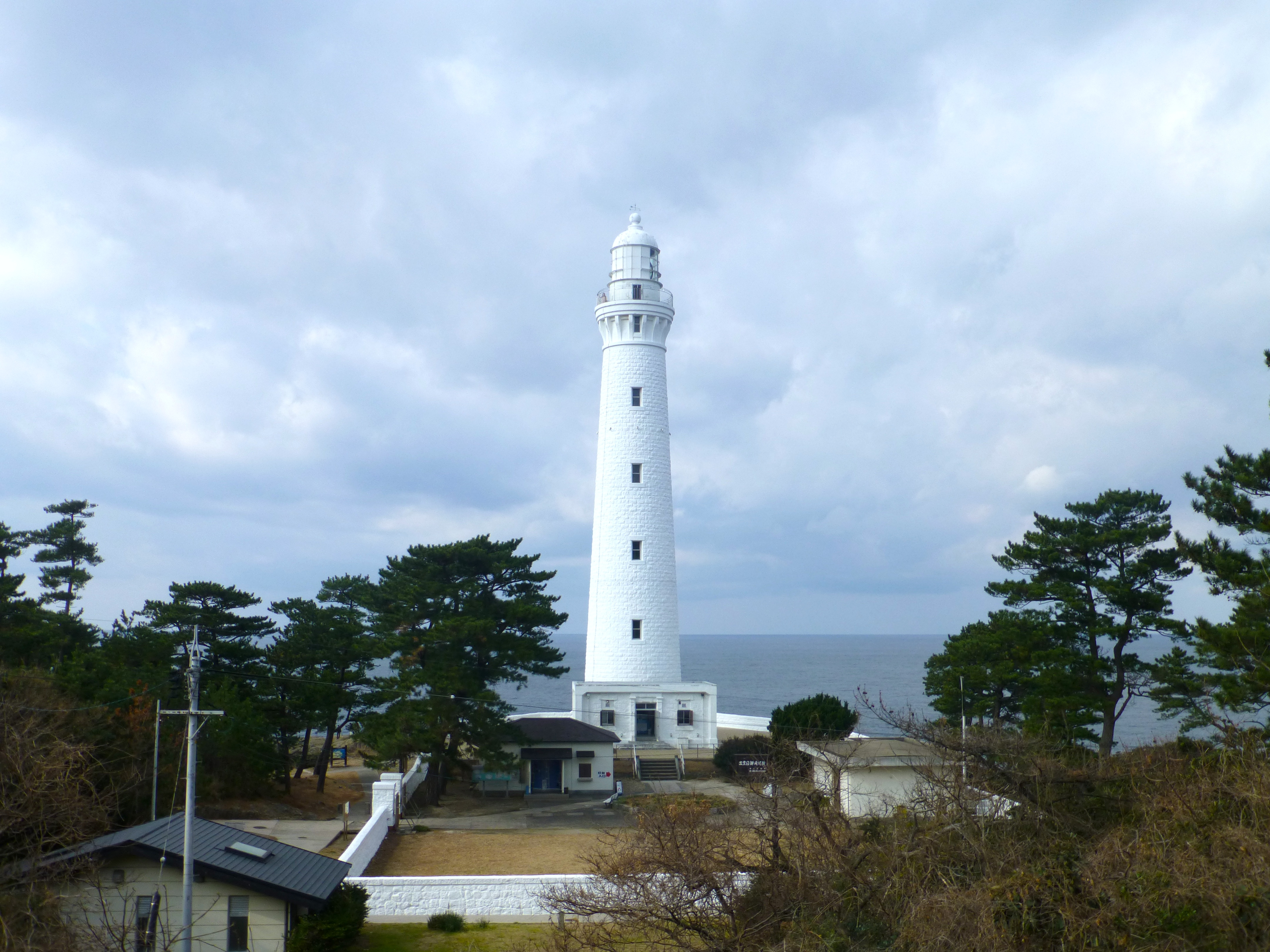
Hinomisaki Lighthouse

== Notable people ==
- Konomi Asazu (浅津 このみ; born 1986), bobsledder
- Takuya Miki (三木 拓也; born 1989), wheelchair tennis player
- Mariya Takeuchi (竹内 まりや; born 1955), singer-songwriter and record producer
