= Imaichi Dainenji Kofun =

Kofun period burial mound

- 今市大念寺古墳 (Japanese)
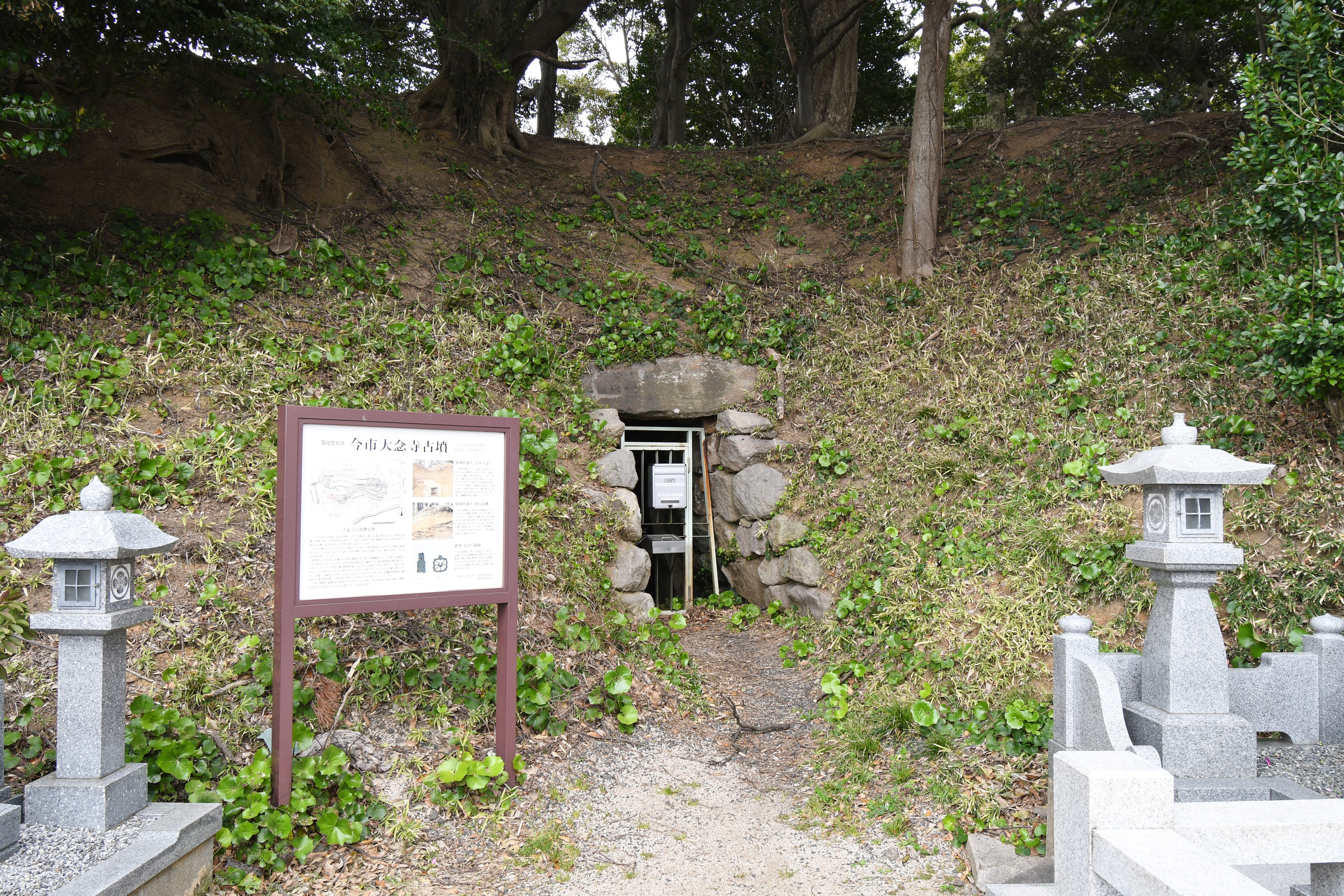
- Imaichi Dainenji Kofun

- Imaichi Dainenji Kofun Imaichi Dainenji Kofun (Japan)
- Interactive map of Imaichi Dainenji Kofun
- 35°21′47.24″N 132°45′53.15″E
- Type: Kofun
- Periods: Kofun period
- Location: Izumo, Shimane, Japan
- Region: San'in region

History
- Built: c.6th century

Site notes
- Public access: Yes (no facilities)

The Imaichi Dainenji Kofun (今市大念寺古墳) is a Kofun period burial mound, located in the Imaichi neighborhood of the city of Izumo, Shimane in the San'in region of Japan. The tumulus was designated a National Historic Site of Japan in 1924. It is the largest keyhole-shaped burial mound in the Izumo region, with a total length of about 100 meters, and the excavated items are designated as Tangible Cultural Properties of Izumo City.

== Overview ==
The Imaichi Dainenji Kofun is located on the edge of a hill overlooking the central part of the Izumo Plain in the eastern part of Shimane Prefecture. It is a zenpō-kōen-fun (前方後円墳), which is shaped like a keyhole, having one square end and one circular end, when viewed from above. The tumulus is adjacent to the Main Hall of Dainen-ji, a Buddhist temple founded in 1452, and the burial chamber of the tumulus was opened when the temple expanded its Main Hall in 1826. Modern archaeological excavations were conducted from 1981 to 1983. The north side was severely damaged due to the construction of the hall, leaving a current total length of 92 meters. The posterior circular portion has a diameter of 45 meters and a height of seven meters. Cylindrical haniwa were found on the surface, but there is no evidence of fukiishi. The tumulus was built using rammed earth, which is rare for a kofun burial mound. The burial chamber is a horizontal stone chamber, and the posterior circular portion opens in the west-southwest direction. Measuring 12.8 meters in total length, the burial chamber is a large multi-chamber structure consisting of a back chamber which held the stone sarcophagus, a front chamber, and a passageway. Many grave goods were unearthed when the burial chamber was opened in the Edo period. These included gilt-bronze sandals, iron swords, spears, axes, horse harnesses, and Sue ware earthenware. Some of these items are still preserved at Dainen-ji, but most have subsequently been lost. From these artifacts, it is estimated that the tumulus was constructed in the latter half of the 6th century in the late Kofun period. Rammed construction is a technique that appears in the Kinai region since around the 7th century, and thus it was an extremely advanced technology at the time of the construction of this tumulus. It is speculated that there is a relationship between this progressiveness and the Hioki clan, a immigrant clan mentioned in the "Izumo no Kuni Fudoki".

The Nishidani Tombs and the Kamienyatsukiyama Kofun are located nearby. The Imaichi Dainenji Kofun is located about one kilometer to the east of Izumoshi Station on the JR West San'in Main Line.

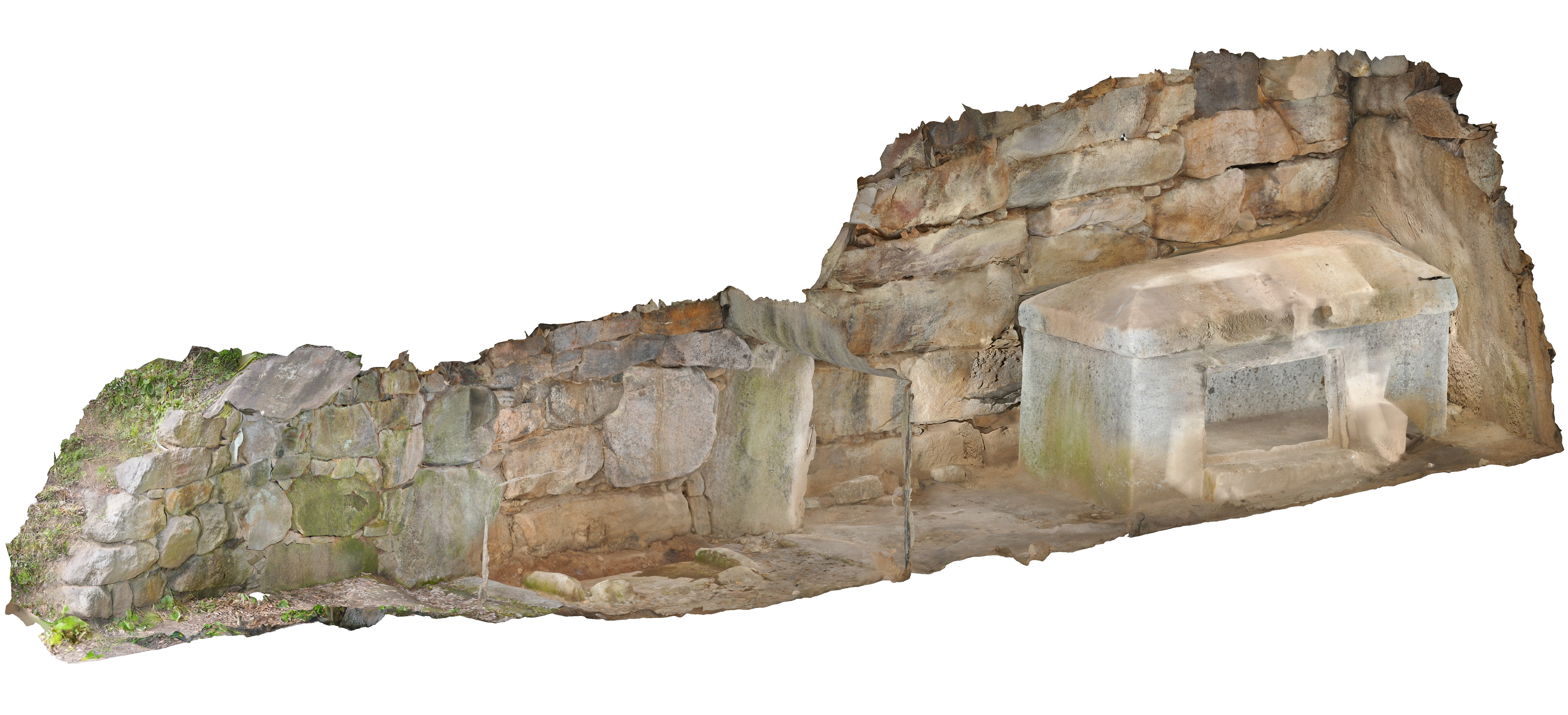
3D rendition of the burial chamber

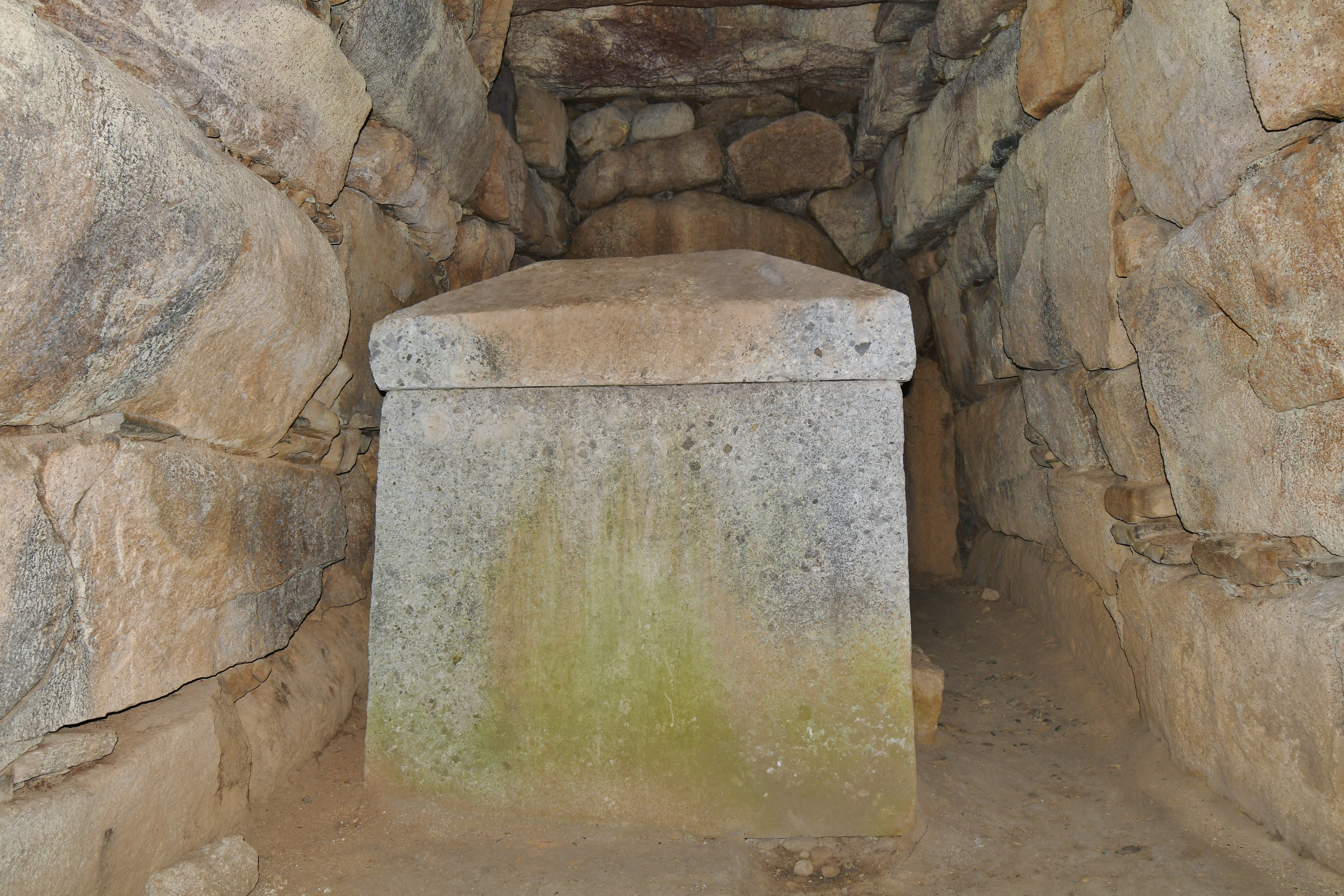
Sarcophagus

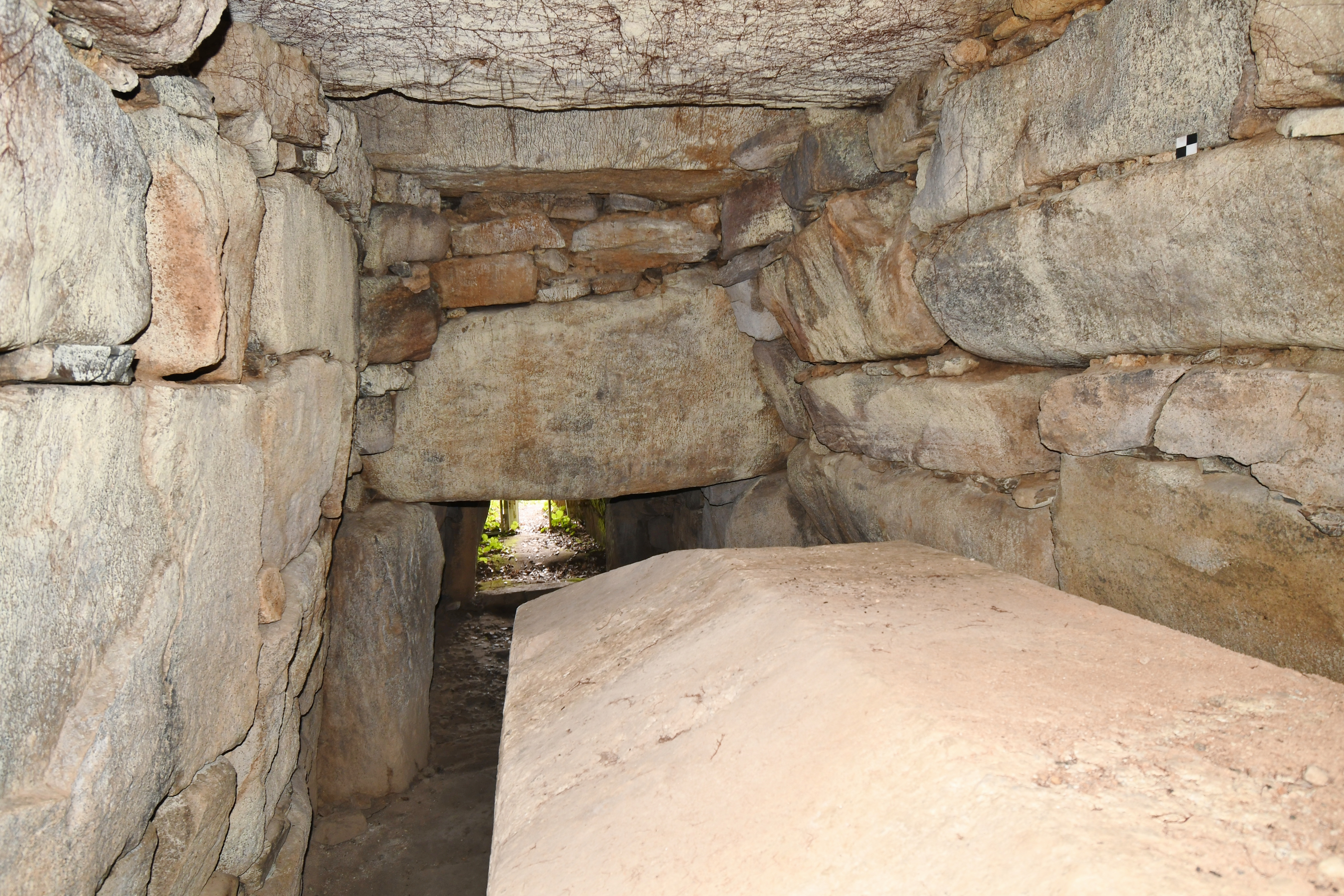
Inside burial chamber looking towards entrance

== See also ==
- List of Historic Sites of Japan (Shimane)
