= Taki, Shimane =

Dissolved municipality in Shimane prefecture, Japan

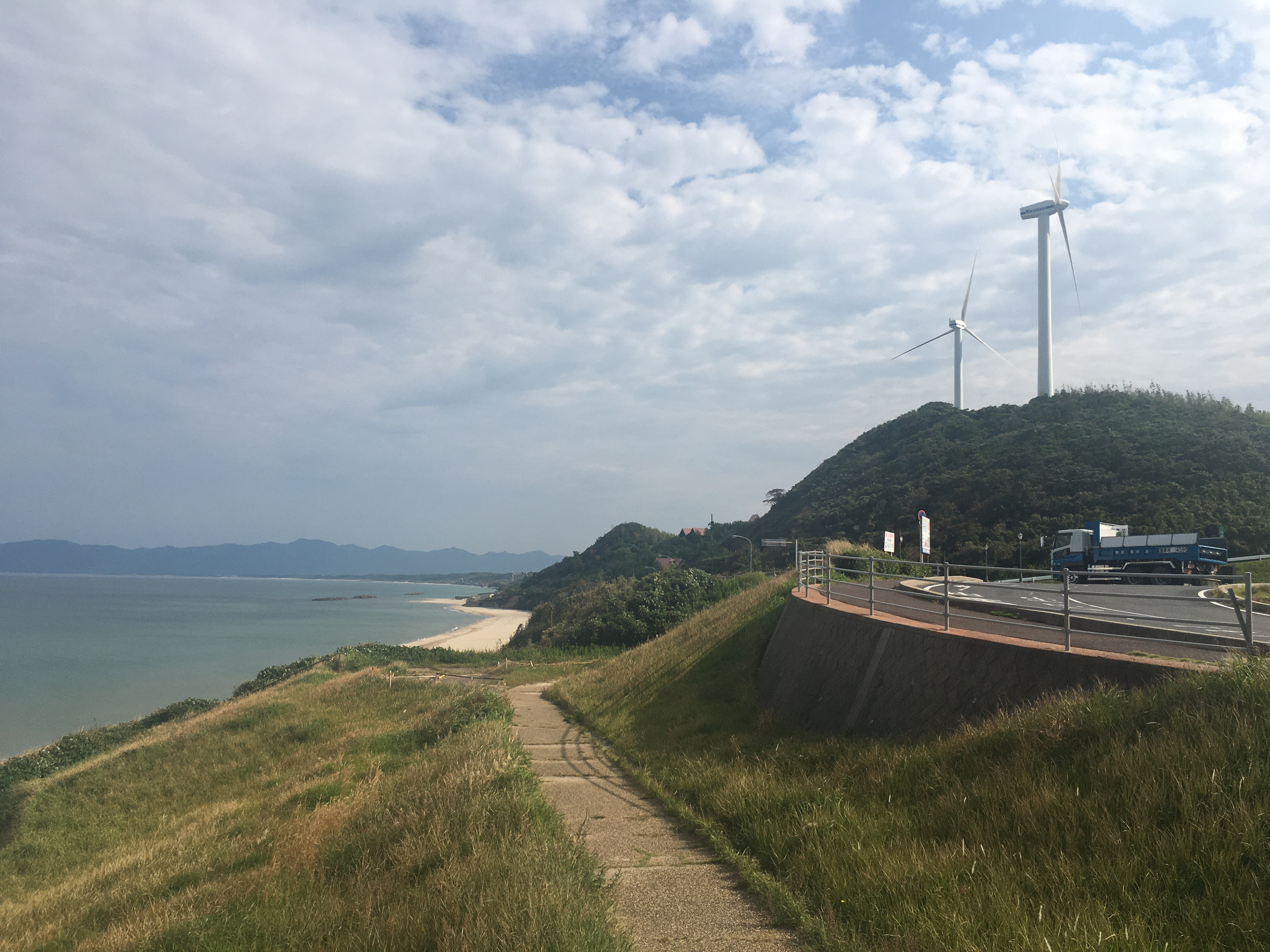
Electric windmills in Taki, 2022

Taki (多伎町, Taki-chō) was a town located in Hikawa District, Shimane Prefecture, Japan.

As of 2003, the town had an estimated population of 4,096 and a density of 74.27 persons per square kilometer. The total area was 55.15 square kilometers. It is located on the Sea of Japan.

On March 22, 2005, Taki, along with the city of Hirata, the towns of Koryō, Sada and Taisha (all from Hikawa District), was merged into the expanded city of Izumo.

Although now part of the city, officially, it is separated from the main part of Izumo by a drive or train ride of about 20 minutes.

It has a sister city, which is Kalajoki, Finland.

Taki has a highway rest stop with Finnish-style architecture and two large electric windmills.
