= Sada, Shimane =

Dissolved municipality in Shimane prefecture, Japan

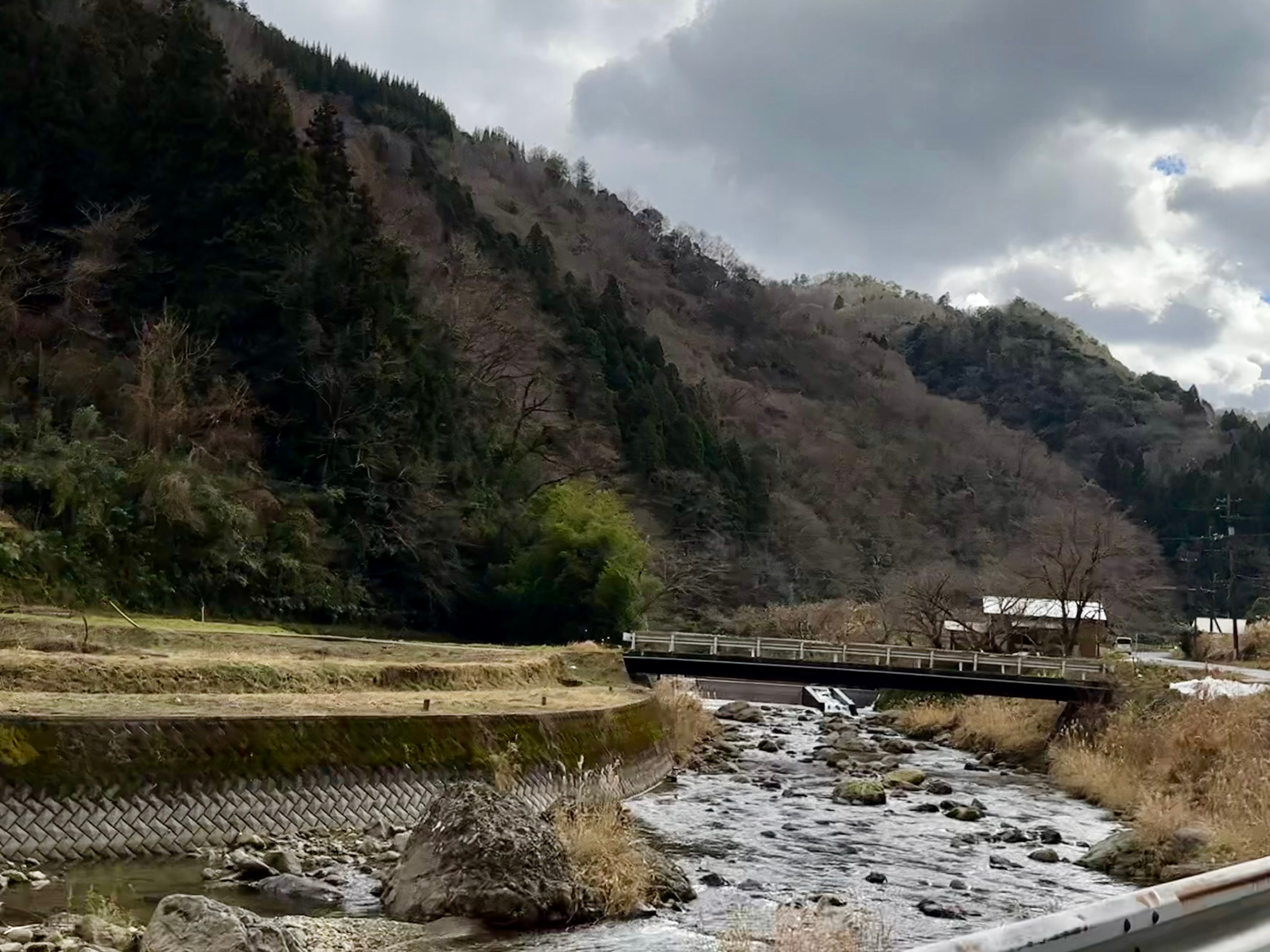
The Hata river in Sada, 2023

Sada (佐田町, Sada-chō) was a town located in Hikawa District, Shimane Prefecture, Japan.

== Population ==
As of 2003, the town had an estimated population of 4,415 and a density of 40.20 persons per km^{2}. The total area was 109.83 km^{2}.

== History ==
On March 22, 2005, Sada, along with the city of Hirata, the towns of Koryō, Taisha and Taki (all from Hikawa District), was merged into the expanded city of Izumo.
