= Nunozaki Station =

Railway station in Izumo, Shimane Prefecture, Japan

Nunozaki Station 布崎駅
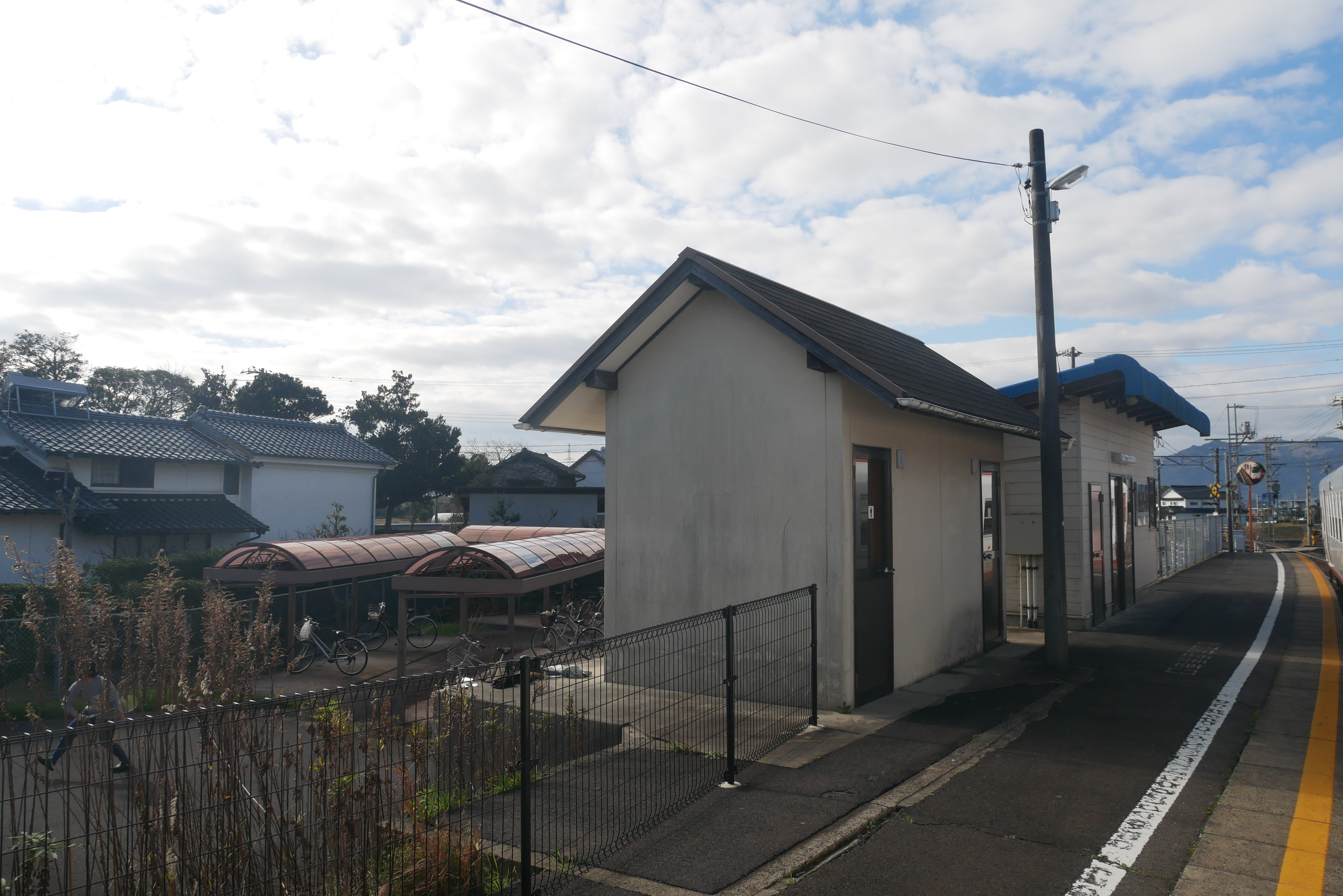
- Nunozaki Station, 2019

General information
- Location: Sonocho, Izumo-shi, Shimane-ken 691-0076; Japan
- Coordinates: 35°27′0.89″N 132°51′18″E
- Operator: Ichibata Electric Railway
- Line: ■ Kita-Matsue Line
- Distance: 14.5 km (9.0 miles) from Dentetsu-Izumoshi
- Platforms: 1 side platform
- Tracks: 1

Construction
- Structure type: at grade

Other information
- Status: Unstaffed
- Station code: 10
- Website: Official website

History
- Opened: 4 February 1915

Passengers
- FY 2019: 130 daily
Location
- Location within Shimane Prefecture Location within Japan

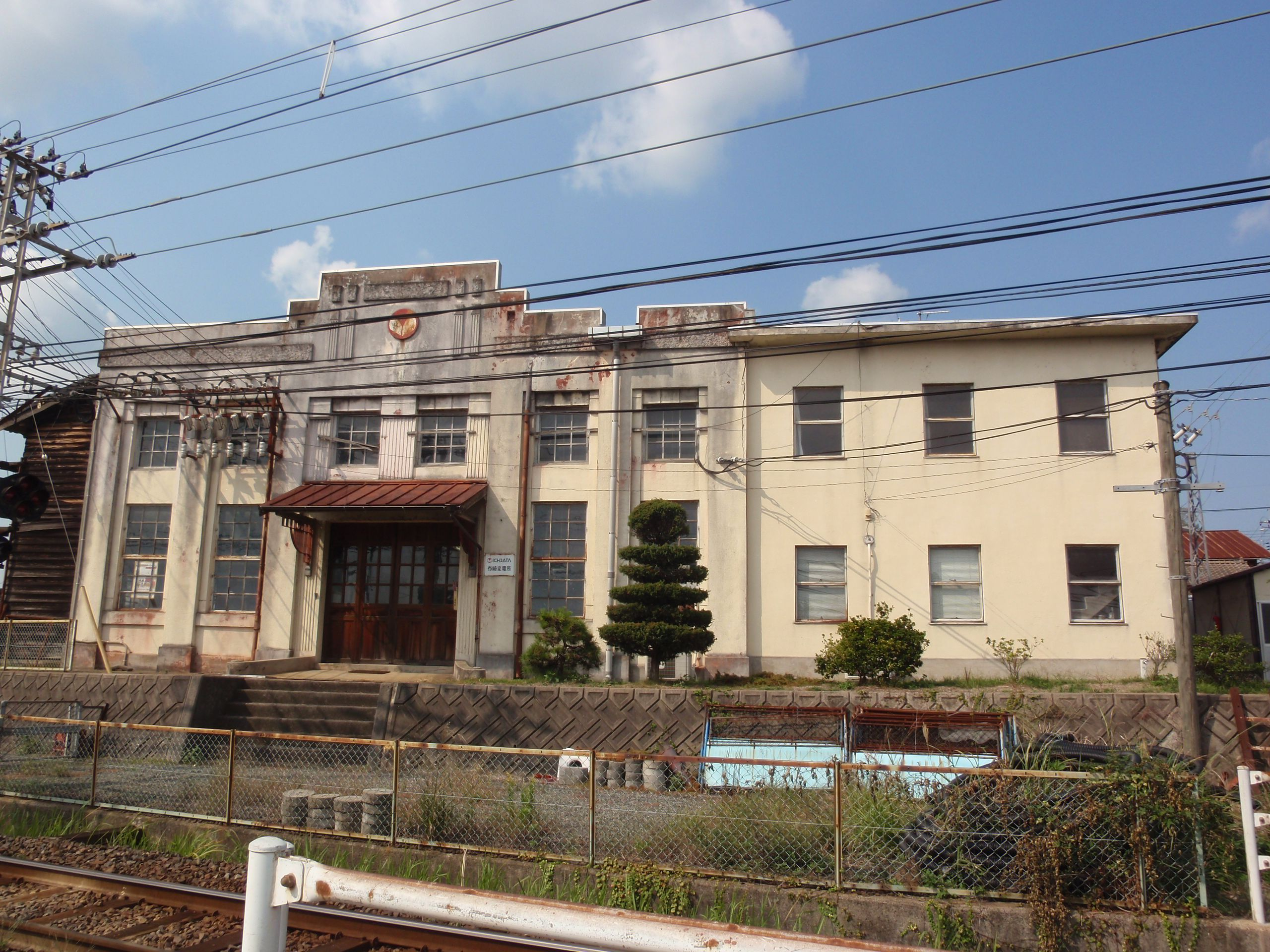
Nunozaki Electrical substation

Nunozaki Station (布崎駅, Nunozaki-eki) is a passenger railway station located in the city of Izumo, Shimane Prefecture, Japan. It is operated by the private transportation company, Ichibata Electric Railway.

== Lines ==
Nunozaki Station is served by the Kita-Matsue Line, and is located 14.5 kilometers from the terminus of the line at Dentetsu-Izumoshi. Express and local services stop at this station.

== Station layout ==
The station consists of one side platform serving a single bi-directional track. There is no station building, but only a shelter on the platform. The station is unattended.

== Adjacent stations ==
«	Service	»
Ichibata Electric Railway
Kita-Matsue Line
Limited Express Superliner: Does not stop at this station
Unshū-Hirata	Express Izumotaisha	Ichibataguchi
Unshū-Hirata	Express	Ichibataguchi
Unshū-Hirata	Local	Koyūkan-Shineki

== History ==
Nunozaki Station was opened on 4 February 1915.

== Passenger statistics ==
In fiscal 2019, the station was used by an average of 130 passengers daily.

== Surrounding area ==
- Nunozaki Electrical Substation, built in 1927, is located next to the station and provides the electrical power for the Ichibata Railway. It appears in the 2010 movie Railways and is a Registered Tangible Cultural Property in 2008.

== See also ==
- List of railway stations in Japan
