= Goryeo language =

The term Goryeo language may refer to:

- Middle Korean, the historical form of Korean spoken during the Goryeo dynasty
- Koryo-mar, the dialect of Korean spoken by ethnic Koreans in the former USSR
- Goguryeo language, the language spoken in the kingdom of Goguryeo

== See also ==
- Koryo (disambiguation)
