= Taisha, Shimane =

Taisha 大社町
- Former municipality
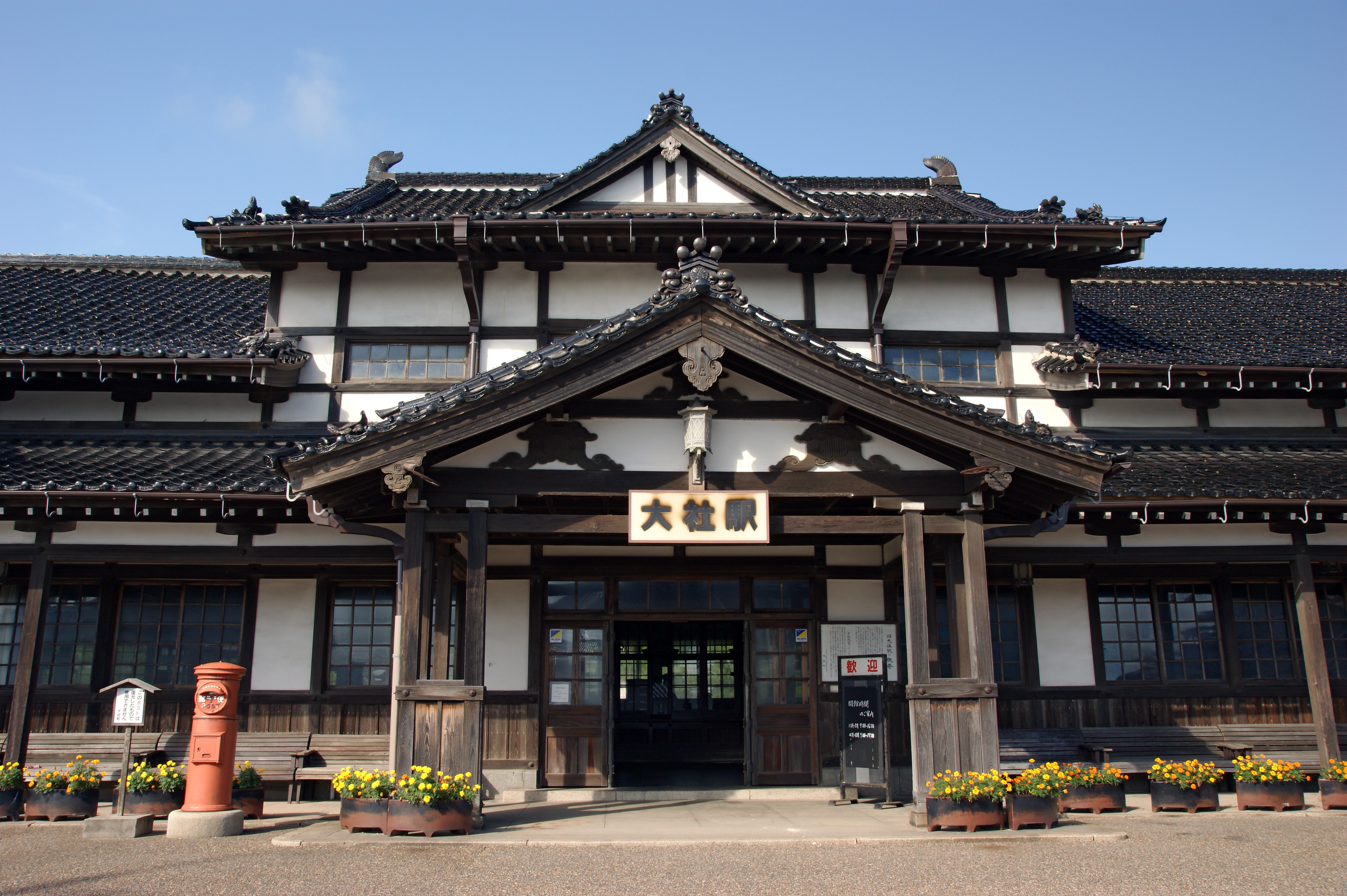
- Taisha old JR station

- Flag Seal

- Location in Japan
- Coordinates: 35.386706°N 132.690222°E
- Country: Japan
- Region: Chūgoku
- Prefecture: Shimane Prefecture
- District: Hikawa
- Merged: March 22, 2005 (now part of Izumo)

Area
  - Total: 41.89 km^{2} (16.17 sq mi)

Population (February, 2004)
  - Total: 16,262
  - Density: 388.21/km^{2} (1,005.5/sq mi)
- Time zone: UTC+09:00 (JST)
- Symbols
- Bird: Black-tailed gull
- Flower: Chrysanthemum
- Tree: Camphor

Taisha (大社町, Taisha-machi) was a town located in Hikawa District, Shimane Prefecture, Japan.

== Population ==
As of 2003, the town had an estimated population of 15,733 and a density of 376.39 persons per km^{2}. The total area was 41.80 km^{2}.

== History ==
On March 22, 2005, Taisha, along with the city of Hirata, the towns of Koryō, Sada and Taki (all from Hikawa District), was merged into the expanded city of Izumo.

== Attractions ==
Taisha is famous for being the location of Izumo Taisha shrine, the oldest Shinto shrine in Japan. Izumo Taisha, along with Ise Grand Shrine in Ise, Mie prefecture are considered two of the most important sites in Shinto.

== Transportation ==
Taisha has one active train station, Izumo Taisha-mae Station owned and run by the Ichibata Electric Railway. This station and other locations within Taisha, including the Izumo Taisha were featured in the 2008 Asadora television drama Dandan, which was partly set in and around the Matsue and Izumo area of Shimane prefecture.

Taisha was formerly connected to Izumo by a JR West line, however the station and line from Izumo to Taisha was closed in 1990. Taisha old JR station remains as a historic building and museum.

== Notable people ==
- Kazuhiko Aoki, politician
- Mikio Aoki, politician
- Mariya Takeuchi, singer and songwriter

== See also ==
- Izumo Taisha
