= Hirata, Shimane =

Dissolved municipality in Shimane prefecture, Japan

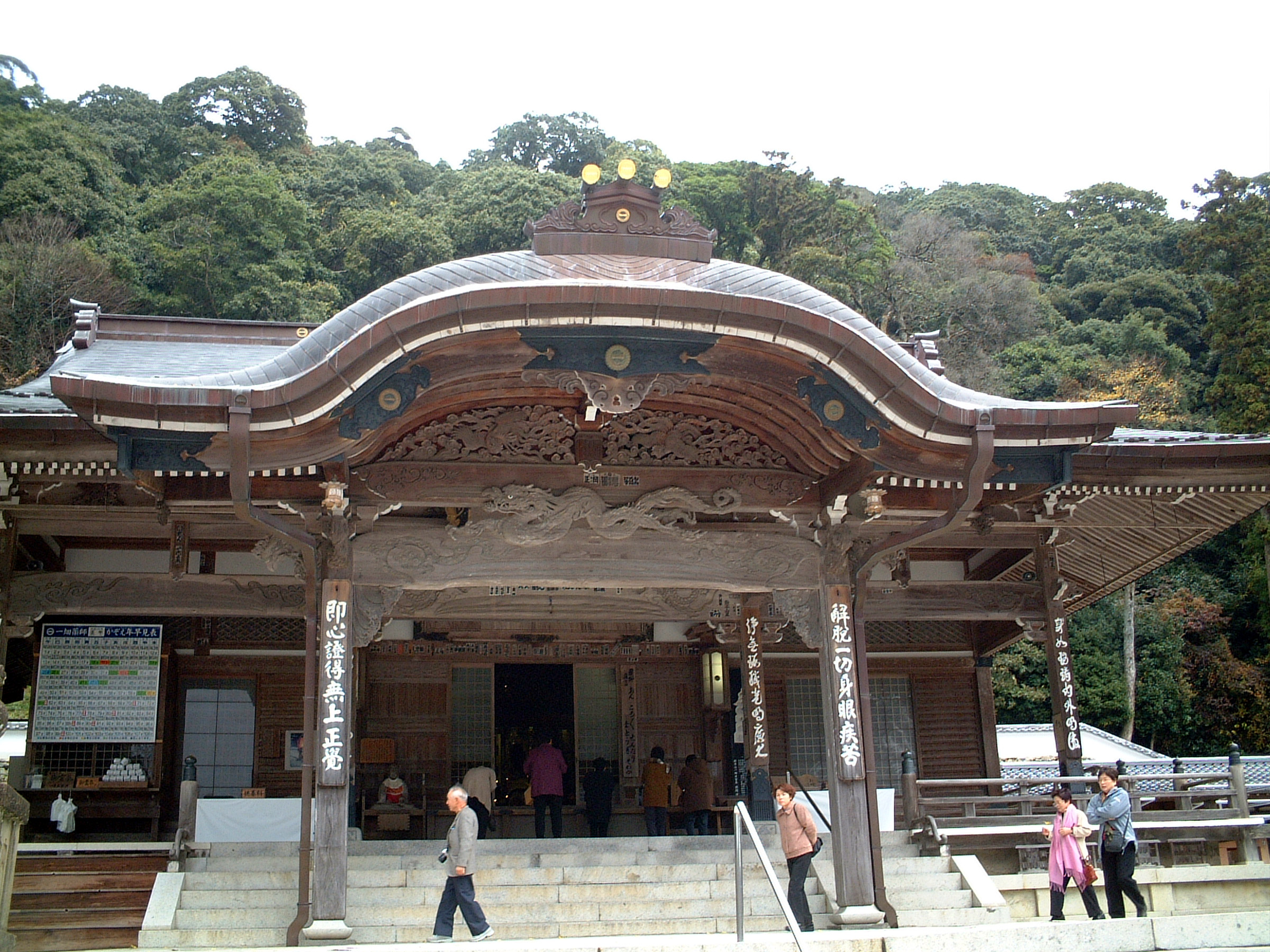
Ichibata-ji Temple

Hirata (平田市, Hirata-shi) was a city located in Shimane Prefecture, Japan. The city was founded on January 1, 1955.

As of 2003, the city had an estimated population of 28,506 and a density of 200.68 persons per km^{2}. The total area was 142.05 km^{2}.

On March 22, 2005, Hirata, along with the towns of Koryō, Sada, Taisha and Taki (all from Hikawa District), was merged into the expanded city of Izumo.

Hirata is connected by rail with Izumo by the Dentetsu rail line. The line continues beyond Hirata as far as Matsue.
