= Koyūkan-Shineki Station =

Railway station in Izumo, Shimane Prefecture, Japan

Koyūkan-Shineki Station 湖遊館新駅駅
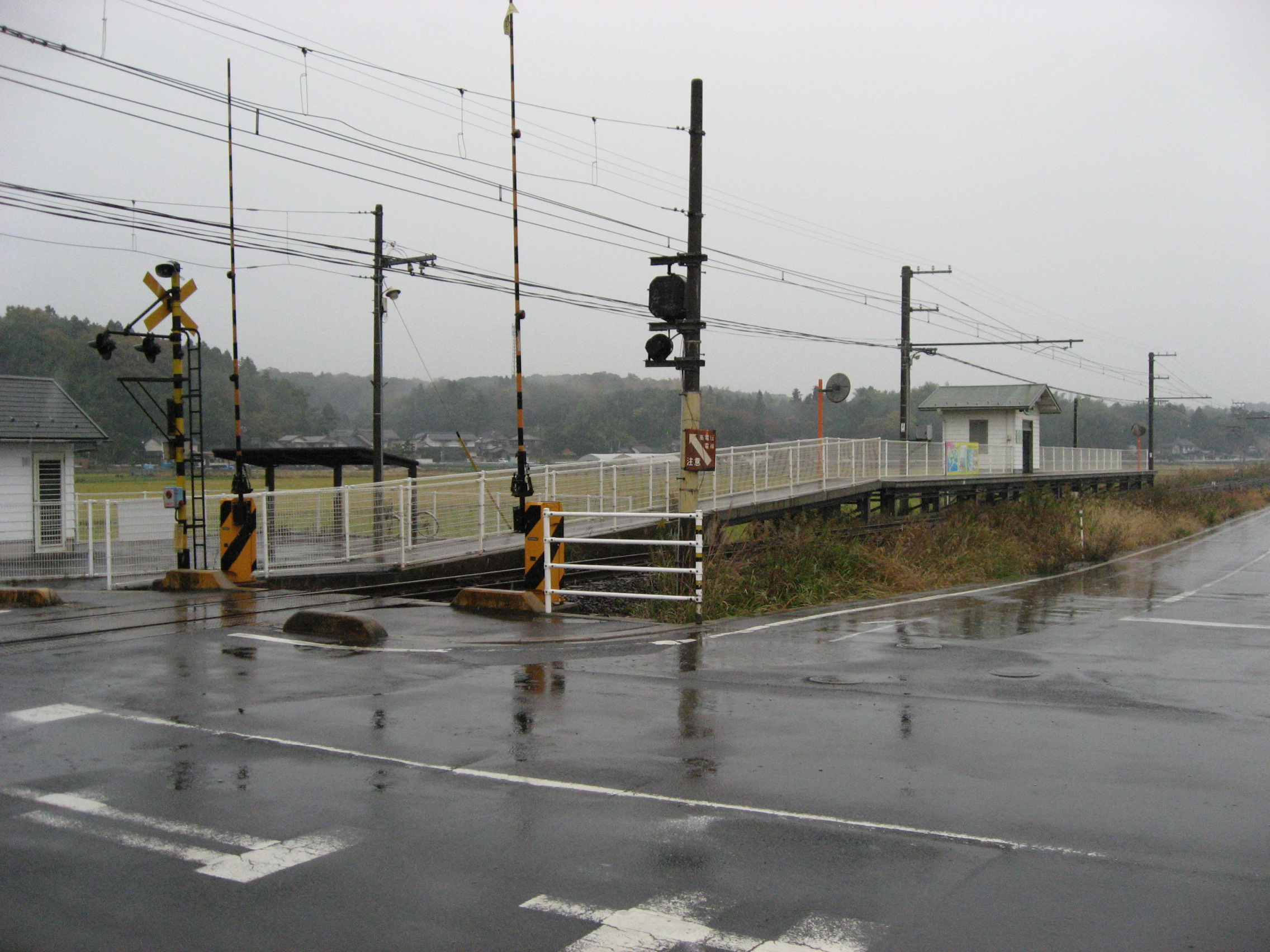
- Station platform

General information
- Location: Sono-cho, Izumo-shi, Shimane-ken 691-0076; Japan
- Coordinates: 35°27′9.4″N 132°51′43.3″E
- Operator: Ichibata Electric Railway
- Line: ■ Kita-Matsue Line
- Distance: 15.2 km (9.4 miles) from Dentetsu-Izumoshi
- Platforms: 1 side platform
- Tracks: 1

Construction
- Structure type: at grade

Other information
- Status: Unstaffed
- Station code: 11
- Website: Official website

History
- Opened: 1 October 1995

Passengers
- FY 2019: 31 daily
Location
- Location within Shimane Prefecture Location within Japan

Koyūkan-Shineki Station (湖遊館新駅駅, Koyūkan-Shineki-eki) is a passenger railway station located in the city of Izumo, Shimane Prefecture, Japan. It is operated by the private transportation company, Ichibata Electric Railway.

== Lines ==
Koyūkan-Shineki Station is served by the Kita-Matsue Line, and is located 15.2 kilometers from the terminus of the line at Dentetsu-Izumoshi. Only local trains stop at this station.

== Station layout ==
The station consists of one side platform serving a single bi-directional track. There is no station building, but only a shelter on the platform. The station is unattended.

== Adjacent stations ==
«	Service	»
Ichibata Electric Railway
Kita-Matsue Line
Limited Express Superliner: Does not stop at this station
Express Izumotaisha: Does not stop at this station
Express: Does not stop at this station
Nunozaki	Local	Sono

== History ==
Koyūkan-Shineki Station was opened on 1 October 1995.

== Passenger statistics ==
In fiscal 2019, the station was used by an average of 31 passengers daily.

== Surrounding area ==
- Shinjiko Park Lake Amusement Park
- Shimane Prefectural Shinjiko Nature Museum
- Lake Shinji

== See also ==
- List of railway stations in Japan
