= Koryō, Shimane =

Town in Shimane Prefecture, Japan

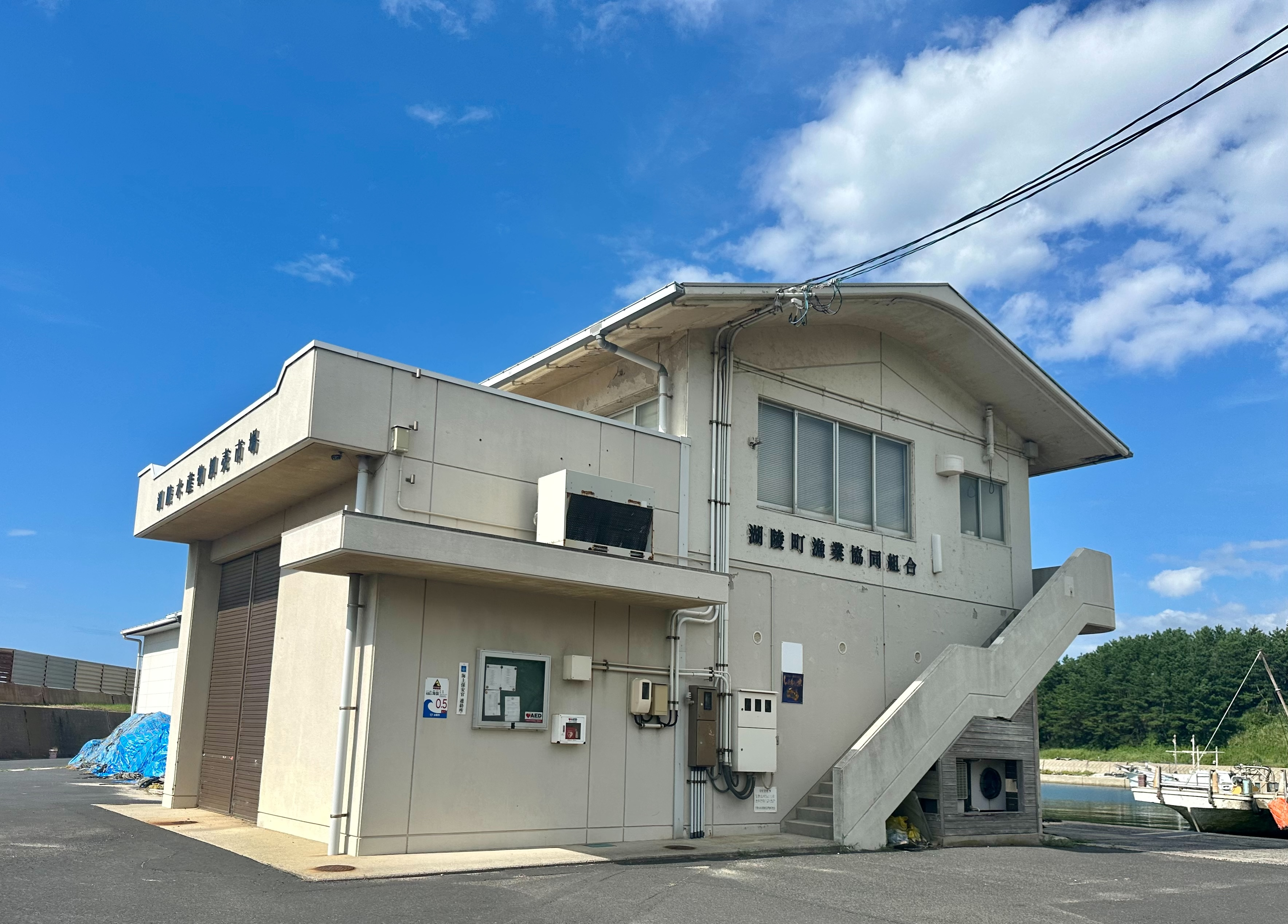
Koryō Seafood Wholesale Market

Koryō (湖陵町, Koryō-chō) was a town located in Hikawa District, Shimane Prefecture, Japan.

As of 2003, the town had an estimated population of 5,843 and a density of 262.49 persons per km^{2}. The total area was 22.26 km^{2}.

On March 22, 2005, Koryō, along with the city of Hirata, the towns of Sada, Taisha and Taki (all from Hikawa District), was merged into the expanded city of Izumo.
