= List of Tsubasa: Reservoir Chronicle episodes =

Japanese keyvisual of the series

Tsubasa: Reservoir Chronicle, a manga by Clamp, has been adapted into four different anime versions between 2005 and 2009, including a two-season anime television series, an anime film, and two original video animation (OVA) series with screenplay provided by Nanase Ohkawa and music composed by Yuki Kajiura. Bee Train adapted the manga series into a fifty-two-episode anime entitled Tsubasa Chronicle directed by Kōichi Mashimo with Hiroshi Morioka joining on as co-director for season two. Hiroyuki Kawasaki scripted both seasons. Production I.G adapted the manga series into both an anime film entitled Tsubasa Chronicle the Movie: The Princess of the Country of Birdcages directed by Itsuro Kawasaki and two OVA adaptations directed by Shunsuke Tada entitled Tsubasa Tokyo Revelations and Tsubasa Shunraiki. Set in a fictional universe involving alternative realities, the story follows a group of five travellers—Syaoran, Sakura, Kurogane, Fai D. Flourite, and Mokona—as they search for fragments of Sakura's memory that take the form of feathers of great power and without which, Sakura will die. The series features much crossover with its sister series xxxHolic, another manga by Clamp.

The first season of the anime series aired on NHK between April 9, 2005, and October 15, 2005, spanning twenty-six episode. The anime film aired in Japanese theaters on August 20, 2005. The second season of the anime series aired on NHK between April 29, 2006, and November 4, 2006, spanning twenty-six episodes. The first OVA was released between November 16, 2007, and March 17, 2008, spanning three episodes. The second OVA was released between March 17, 2009, and May 15, 2009, spanning two episodes.

The two seasons of the anime series were dubbed by the anime television network Animax under the title Chronicle of the Wings and later began broadcast on April 6, 2006, across its English-language networks in Southeast Asia and South Asia as well as its other networks in Taiwan and Hong Kong. Funimation Entertainment licensed both seasons of the anime for English-language release in North America under the name Tsubasa: Reservoir Chronicle. Funimation has also released the first season of the anime in the United Kingdom through Revelation Films. Revelation Films had confirmed the release of the second season of Tsubasa Chronicle in the U.K. but no release dates were ever confirmed.

== Tsubasa: Reservoir Chronicle ==
=== Season 1 (2005) ===
No.	Title	Location	Original release date
1	"Destinies Converge"; Transliteration: "Hitsuzen no Deai" (Japanese: 必然のデアイ)	Clow Kingdom	April 9, 2005
2	"The Power to Fight"; Transliteration: "Tatakau Chikara" (Japanese: 戦うチカラ)	Japan	April 16, 2005
3	"Sword of Demon Destruction"; Transliteration: "Hama no Katana" (Japanese: 破魔のカタナ)	Hanshin Republic	April 23, 2005
4	"Innocent Wandering"; Transliteration: "Kegare Naki Hōrō" (Japanese: 汚れなき放浪)	Hanshin Republic	April 30, 2005
5	"The Battle of the Mage"; Transliteration: "Majutsushi no Batoru" (Japanese: 魔術師のバトル)	Hanshin Republic	May 7, 2005
6	"Unshed Tears"; Transliteration: "Nakanai Namida" (Japanese: 泣かないナミダ)	Hanshin Republic	May 14, 2005
7	"The Broken Memento"; Transliteration: "Kudaketa Katami" (Japanese: 砕けたカタミ)	Koryo Country	May 21, 2005
8	"God's Beloved Daughter"; Transliteration: "Kami no Manamusume" (Japanese: 神の愛娘)	Koryo Country	May 28, 2005
9	"Princess of Shadows"; Transliteration: "Ayashiki Onna" (Japanese: 妖しきオンナ)	Koryo Country	June 4, 2005
10	"Mirror of Separation"; Transliteration: "Wakare no Kagami" (Japanese: 別離のカガミ)	Koryo Country	June 11, 2005
11	"The Chosen Tomorrow"; Transliteration: "Erabareta Ashita" (Japanese: 選ばれたアシタ)	Koryo Country	June 18, 2005
12	"The Warm Smile"; Transliteration: "Atatakana Egao" (Japanese: 暖かなエガオ)	Fog Country	June 25, 2005
13	"Advocate of Illusions"; Transliteration: "Maboroshi no Otogi" (Japanese: まぼろしのオトギ)	Jade Country	July 2, 2005
14	"Truth In History"; Transliteration: "Shinjitsu no Rekishi" (Japanese: 真実のレキシ)	Jade Country	July 9, 2005
15	"A Heart that Believes"; Transliteration: "Shinjiru Kokoro" (Japanese: 信じるココロ)	Jade Country	July 16, 2005
16	"Strength and Kindness"; Transliteration: "Tsuyosa to Yasashisa" (Japanese: 強さと優しさ)	Storm Country	July 23, 2005
17	"Demon Hunters"; Transliteration: "Sakura no Kuni no Kafe" (Japanese: 桜の国のカフェ)	Ōto Country	July 30, 2005
18	"Cat and Dog"; Transliteration: "Nyanko to Wanko" (Japanese: にゃんことワンコ)	Ōto Country	August 20, 2005
19	"Living Resolve"; Transliteration: "Ikiru Kakugo" (Japanese: 生きるカクゴ)	Ōto Country	August 27, 2005
20	"The Afternoon Piano"; Transliteration: "Gogo no Piano" (Japanese: 午後のピアノ)	Ōto Country	September 3, 2005
21	"The Imp's True Face"; Transliteration: "Oni no Sugao" (Japanese: 鬼児のスガオ)	Ōto Country	September 10, 2005
22	"The Indelible Memory"; Transliteration: "Kesenai Kioku" (Japanese: 消せないキオク)	Ōto Country	September 17, 2005
23	"The Vanishing Life"; Transliteration: "Kie yuku Inochi" (Japanese: 消えゆくイノチ)	Ōto Country	September 24, 2005
24	"The Blade of a Desperate Fight"; Transliteration: "Shitō no Yaiba" (Japanese: 死闘のヤイバ)	Edonis Country	October 1, 2005
25	"The Ultimate Game"; Transliteration: "Kyūkyoku no Gēmu" (Japanese: 究極のゲーム)	Edonis Country	October 8, 2005
26	"The Last Wish"; Transliteration: "Saigo no Negai" (Japanese: 最後の願い)	Tsarastora Country	October 15, 2005

=== Season 2 (2006) ===
No.	Title	Location	Original release date
27	"Dangerous Race"; Transliteration: "Kiken na Rēsu" (Japanese: 危険なレース)	Piffle World	April 29, 2006
28	"The Three Badges"; Transliteration: "Mittsu no Bajji" (Japanese: 三つのバッジ)	Piffle World	May 5, 2006
29	"Goal of Glory"; Transliteration: "Eikō no Gōru" (Japanese: 栄光のゴール)	Piffle World	May 13, 2006
30	"Sorrowful Miracle"; Transliteration: "Kanashii Kiseki" (Japanese: 哀しいキセキ)	Tsarastora Country	May 20, 2006
31	"A Young Man's Resolve"; Transliteration: "Shōnen no Ketsui" (Japanese: 少年のケツイ)	Portoria Country	May 27, 2006
32	"A Date with a Wizard"; Transliteration: "Majutsushi to Dēto" (Japanese: 魔術師とデート)	Fort City Bit	June 3, 2006
33	"The Origins of Ashura"; Transliteration: "Ashura no Iware" (Japanese: 阿修羅のイワレ)	Shara Country	June 10, 2006
34	"Endless War"; Transliteration: "Owarinaki Ikusa" (Japanese: 終わりなきイクサ)	Shara Country	June 17, 2006
35	"Two Memories"; Transliteration: "Futatsu no Kioku" (Japanese: ふたつのキオク)	Shura Country	June 24, 2006
36	"Love that Transcends Time"; Transliteration: "Toki o Koeru Omoi" (Japanese: 時をこえるオモイ)	Shura and Shara Country	July 1, 2006
37	"Mokona the Artist"; Transliteration: "Oekaki Mokona" (Japanese: おえかきモコナ)	Cartoon World	July 8, 2006
38	"Dangerous Road"; Transliteration: "Kiken na Rōdo" (Japanese: 危険なロード)	Principality of Darōga	July 15, 2006
39	"The Beginning of a Farewell"; Transliteration: "Hajimari no Wakare" (Japanese: 始まりのワカレ)	Principality of Darōga	July 22, 2006
40	"Black Steel"; Transliteration: "Kuroki Hagane" (Japanese: 黒き鋼)	Rekord Country	July 29, 2006
41	"Secret of the Library"; Transliteration: "Toshokan no Himitsu" (Japanese: 図書館のヒミツ)	Rekord Country	August 5, 2006
42	"Faraway Homesickness"; Transliteration: "Bōkyō no Kanata" (Japanese: 望郷のカナタ)	Rekord Country	August 26, 2006
43	"The Fifth Oath"; Transliteration: "Itsutsume no Chikai" (Japanese: 五つ目のチカイ)	Rekord Country	September 2, 2006
44	"Kero and Mokona"; Transliteration: "Kero-chan to Mokona" (Japanese: ケロちゃんとモコナ)	Kero World	September 9, 2006
45	"The Second Hardship"; Transliteration: "Nidome no Kunan" (Japanese: 二度目のクナン)	Koryo Country	September 16, 2006
46	"The Secret of Hijutsu"; Transliteration: "Hijutsu no Gokui" (Japanese: 秘術のゴクイ)	Kiishimu Country	September 23, 2006
47	"Sakura Works"; Transliteration: "Hataraku Sakura" (Japanese: はたらくサクラ)	Ragtime World	September 30, 2006
48	"Feather-King Chaos"; Transliteration: "Haō Kaosu" (Japanese: 羽王カオス)	Tao Country	October 7, 2006
49	"A Warped Wish"; Transliteration: "Yuganda Negai" (Japanese: 歪んだネガイ)	Tao Country	October 14, 2006
50	"Determined Friends"; Transliteration: "Ketsui no Nakama" (Japanese: 決意のナカマ)	Tao Country	October 21, 2006
51	"A Frozen Spirit"; Transliteration: "Itetsuku Mitama" (Japanese: 凍てつくミタマ)	Tao Country	October 28, 2006
52	"Wings Toward Tomorrow"; Transliteration: "Asu e no Tsubasa" (Japanese: 明日へのツバサ)	Tao Country	November 4, 2006

== Distribution ==
=== Japanese ===
The adaptations were originally released in Japan across twenty Region 2 DVDs between 2005 and 2009 by Bandai Visual. The anime series Tsubasa Chronicle was released across fourteen DVDs between August 26, 2005, and February 23, 2007. Shochiku released the anime film Tsubasa the Movie: The Princess in the Country of Birdcages in one DVD on February 25, 2006. The first OVA series Tsubasa Tokyo Revelations was released across three DVDs bundled with the limited versions of volumes 21, 22 and 23 of the manga released between November 16, 2007, and March 17, 2008. The second OVA series Tsubasa Shunraiki was released across two DVDs bundled with the limited versions of the volume 26 and 27 of the manga released on March 17, 2009, and May 15, 2009, respectively.

Title	Release date	Episodes
Tsubasa Chronicle I (ツバサ·クロニクル I, Tsubasa Kuronikuru I)	August 26, 2005	1-2
Tsubasa Chronicle II (ツバサ·クロニクル II, Tsubasa Kuronikuru II)	September 23, 2005	3-6
Tsubasa Chronicle III (ツバサ·クロニクル III, Tsubasa Kuronikuru III)	October 28, 2005	7-10
Tsubasa Chronicle IV (ツバサ·クロニクル IV, Tsubasa Kuronikuru IV)	November 25, 2005	11-14
Tsubasa Chronicle V (ツバサ·クロニクル V, Tsubasa Kuronikuru V)	December 23, 2005	15-18
Tsubasa Chronicle VI (ツバサ·クロニクル VI, Tsubasa Kuronikuru VI)	January 27, 2006	19-22
Tsubasa Chronicle VII (ツバサ·クロニクル VII, Tsubasa Kuronikuru VII)	February 24, 2006	23-26
Tsubasa Chronicle the Movie: The Princess of the Land of Birdcages (劇場版 ツバサ·クロニクル鳥カゴの国の姫君, Gekijōban Tsubasa Kuronikuru Torikago no Kuni no Himegimi)	February 25, 2006	Movie
Tsubasa Chronicle the Movie: The Princess of the Land of Birdcages - Premium Edition (劇場版 ツバサ·クロニクル鳥カゴの国の姫君 プレミアム·エディション, Gekijōban Tsubasa Kuronikuru Torikago no Kuni no Himegimi Puremiamu Edishon)	February 25, 2006	Movie
Tsubasa Chronicle Second Series I (ツバサ·クロニクル 第2シリーズ I, Tsubasa Kuronikuru Dai ni Shirīzu I)	August 25, 2006	27-28
Tsubasa Chronicle Second Series II (ツバサ·クロニクル 第2シリーズ II, Tsubasa Kuronikuru Dai ni Shirīzu II)	September 22, 2006	29-32
Tsubasa Chronicle Second Series III (ツバサ·クロニクル 第2シリーズ III, Tsubasa Kuronikuru Dai ni Shirīzu III)	October 27, 2006	33-36
Tsubasa Chronicle Second Series IV (ツバサ·クロニクル 第2シリーズ IV, Tsubasa Kuronikuru Dai ni Shirīzu IV)	November 24, 2006	37-40
Tsubasa Chronicle Second Series V (ツバサ·クロニクル 第2シリーズ V, Tsubasa Kuronikuru Dai ni Shirīzu V)	December 22, 2006	41-44
Tsubasa Chronicle Second Series VI (ツバサ·クロニクル 第2シリーズ VI, Tsubasa Kuronikuru Dai ni Shirīzu VI)	January 26, 2007	45-48
Tsubasa Chronicle Second Series VII (ツバサ·クロニクル 第2シリーズ VII, Tsubasa Kuronikuru Dai ni Shirīzu VII)	February 23, 2007	49-52
Tsubasa TOKYO REVELATIONS 1: The Magician's Message (ツバサ TOKYO REVELATIONS 1 魔術師の伝言, Tsubasa Tōkyō Reberēshon Ichi Majutsushi no Dengon)	November 16, 2007	First OVA 1
Tsubasa TOKYO REVELATIONS 2: The Boy's Right Eye (ツバサ TOKYO REVELATIONS 2 少年の右目, Tsubasa Tōkyō Reberēshon Ni Shōnen no Migi Me)	January 17, 2008	First OVA 2
Tsubasa TOKYO REVELATIONS 3: The Dream the Princess Saw (ツバサ TOKYO REVELATIONS 3 姫君の視た夢, Tsubasa Tōkyō Reberēshon San Himegimi no Mita Yume)	March 17, 2008	First OVA 3
Tsubasa Shunraiki - Zenpen (ツバサ春雷記 -前編-)	March 17, 2009	Second OVA 1
Tsubasa Shunraiki - Kōhen (ツバサ春雷記 -後編-)	May 15, 2009	Second OVA 2

=== English ===
Funimation Entertainment released the series in both North America and the United Kingdom. In North America, Funimation released the two seasons of the anime series across twelve Region 1 DVD compilations between May 22, 2007, and March 17, 2009. Funimation released the DVDs in two collections each containing six of the DVDs together in a boxset on November 11, 2008, and December 29, 2009. Funimation also released the anime film alongside its sister series' corresponding film xxxHolic: A Midsummer Night's Dream as a double feature DVD on February 19, 2008. In the United Kingdom, Funimation released the first season of the anime across six Region 2 DVD compilations through Revelation Films between September 17, 2007, and March 16, 2009. Funimation released those six DVDs in a single boxset on March 16, 2009. In Australia and New Zealand, Madman Entertainment released the two seasons of the anime across twelve Region 4 DVD compilations between September 12, 2007, and June 24, 2009. Madman released the DVDs in two collections each containing six of the DVDs together in a boxset on November 12, 2008, and December 16, 2009.

Title	US Release date	UK Release date	AU Release date	Episodes
Tsubasa: Reservoir Chronicle Volume 1 - Gathering of Fates (including Season 1 Starter Set)	May 22, 2007	September 17, 2007	September 12, 2007	1-5
Tsubasa: Reservoir Chronicle Volume 2 - Seeds of Revolution	July 17, 2007	November 19, 2007	November 7, 2007	6-10
Tsubasa: Reservoir Chronicle Volume 3 - Spectres of Legend	August 28, 2007	January 21, 2008	December 5, 2007	11-14
Tsubasa: Reservoir Chronicle Volume 4 - Between Death and Danger	October 9, 2007	April 21, 2008	January 23, 2008	15-18
Tsubasa: Reservoir Chronicle Volume 5 - Hunters and Prey	November 20, 2007	July 21, 2008	February 13, 2008	19-22
Tsubasa: Reservoir Chronicle Volume 6 - A Wish Upon Waking	January 8, 2008	March 16, 2009	March 19, 2008	23-26
Tsubasa: Reservoir Chronicle Season 1 Boxset	November 11, 2008	March 16, 2009	November 12, 2008	1-26
Clamp Double Feature: Tsubasa Chronicle and xxxHolic	February 19, 2008	—	July 23, 2008	Movie
Tsubasa: Reservoir Chronicle Volume 7 - The Dangerous Pursuit (including Season 2 Starter Set)	August 19, 2008	—	November 12, 2008	27-31
Tsubasa: Reservoir Chronicle Volume 8 - A Tragic Illusion	September 30, 2008	—	January 14, 2009	32-36
Tsubasa: Reservoir Chronicle Volume 9 - Renegades and Strays	November 11, 2008	—	March 18, 2009	37-40
Tsubasa: Reservoir Chronicle Volume 10 - Answers Without Questions	December 23, 2008	—	April 15, 2009	41-44
Tsubasa: Reservoir Chronicle Volume 11 - On the Brink of Chaos	February 3, 2009	—	May 20, 2009	45-48
Tsubasa: Reservoir Chronicle Volume 12 - The Soul of Memory	March 17, 2009	—	June 24, 2009	49-52
Tsubasa: Reservoir Chronicle Season 2 Boxset	December 29, 2009	—	December 16, 2009	27-52
Tsubasa: Reservoir Chronicle Collected Memories Box Set	January 19, 2010	—	—	1-52; Movie
