= Hikawa, Shimane =

Dissolved municipality in Hikawa district, Shimane prefecture, Japan

Coordinates: 35°23′N 132°50′E

Location of Hikawa in Shimane Prefecture

Hikawa (斐川町, Hikawa-chō) was a town located in Hikawa District, Shimane Prefecture, Japan.

As of 2003, the town had an estimated population of 27,246 and a density of 337.87 persons per km^{2}. The total area was 80.64 km^{2}.

On October 1, 2011, Hikawa was merged into the expanded city of Izumo and no longer exists as an independent municipality. Hikawa District was dissolved as a result of this merger.

Izumo Airport is located in the former territory of Hikawa.
