= Hikawa (surname) =

Hikawa (written: 氷川) is a Japanese surname. Notable people with the surname include:

- Hekiru Hikawa (氷川 へきる; born 1975), Japanese manga artist
- Kiyoshi Hikawa (氷川 きよし; born 1977), Japanese enka singer
- Ryūsuke Hikawa (氷川 竜介; born 1958), Japanese anime critic and writer

== Fictional characters ==
- Hina Hikawa (氷川 日菜), a character in the media franchise BanG Dream!
- Sayo Hikawa (氷川 紗夜), a character in the media franchise BanG Dream!
