= Hikawa District, Shimane =

District located in Japan

Coordinates: 35.39°N 132.83°E

Hikawa (簸川郡, Hikawa-gun) was a district located in Shimane Prefecture, Japan.

As of 2003, the district had an estimated population of 57,333 and a density of 185.14 persons per km^{2}. The total area was 309.68 km^{2}.

== Towns and villages ==
- Hikawa
- Koryō
- Sada
- Taisha
- Taki

== Merger ==
- On March 22, 2005 - the towns of Koryō, Sada, Taisha and Taki, along with the city of Hirata, were merged into the expanded city of Izumo.
- On October 1, 2011 - the town of Hikawa was merged into the expanded city of Izumo. Hikawa District was dissolved as a result of this merger.
