= Chiburijima =

Island in the Oki archipelago in the Sea of Japan

Native name: 知夫里島, Chiburi
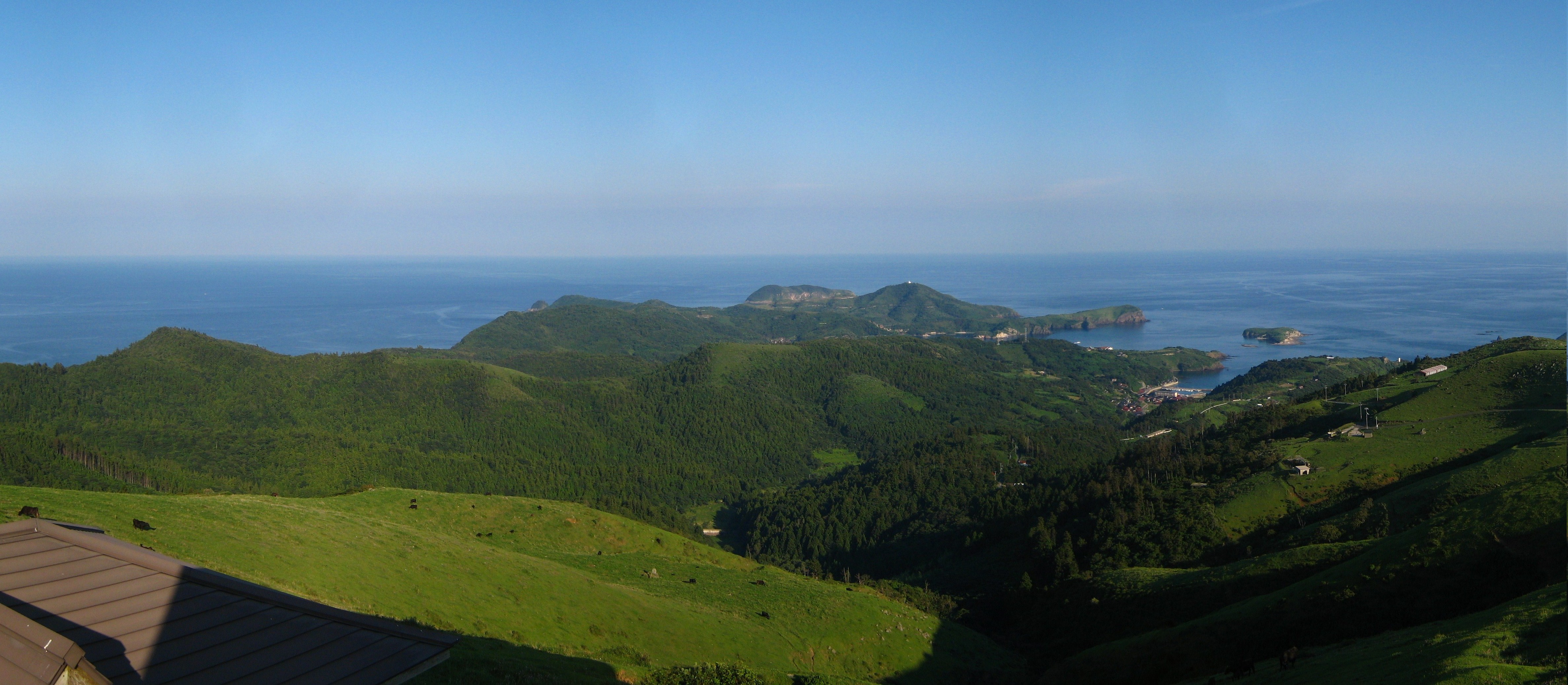
- Chiburijima

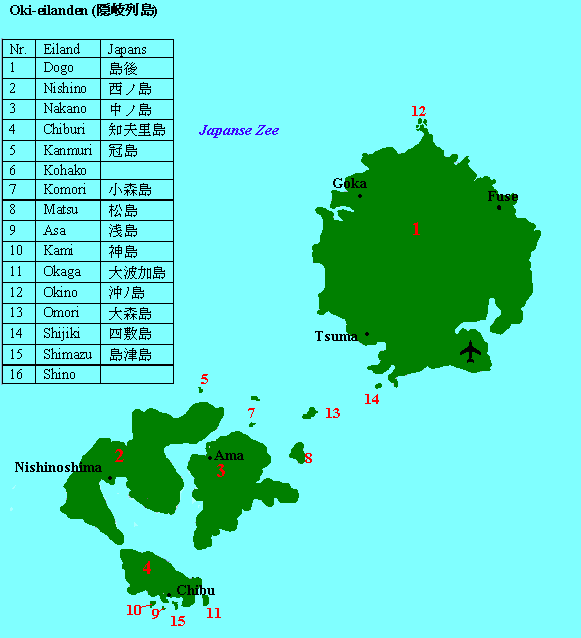

Geography
- Location: Sea of Japan
- Coordinates: 36°1′N 133°02′E
- Archipelago: Oki Islands
- Area: 13.7 km^{2} (5.3 sq mi)
- Coastline: 27.0 km (16.78 mi)
- Highest elevation: 325 m (1066 ft)

Administration
- Japan
- Prefectures: Shimane Prefecture
- District: Oki District
- Town: Chibu

Demographics
- Population: 650 (2013)
- Ethnic groups: Japanese

Chiburijima (知夫里島) is one of the Dōzen Islands in the Oki archipelago in the Sea of Japan.

The island, 13.7 km^{2} in area, has a population of approximately 650 persons and is the smallest of the inhabited islands in the Oki archipelago in area and in population. Administratively the island is administered by the village of Chibu in Shimane Prefecture. Much of the island is within the borders of Daisen-Oki National Park. Chiburijima is the only island of the Oki Islands with tanuki. There are only about 650 people but probably more than 2,000 tanuki.

== Geography ==
Chiburijima is the smallest of the three major islands forming the Dozen group within the Oki archipelago approximately 80 kilometres (43 nmi) north of the Honshu coast. These islands were formed when the caldera of a single ancient volcanic island collapsed, leaving three islands in a ring formation.

Chiburijima is generally mountainous, but the south central area is somewhat flat. There are a number of sea cliffs, particularly on the western side of the island which faces the open expanse of the Sea of Japan. The highest point is 325 metres (1,066 ft) above sea level. The island's two most well-known natural features are Mount Akahage (アカハゲ山, Akahage-yama) and Sekiheki (赤壁), a sea-cliff composed of red rock.

As an island located in the Sea of Japan, Chiburijima is within the Sea of Japan climate zone. Summers temperatures, though usually mild, are exacerbated by high humidity. Winter temperatures are also generally mild, though exacerbated by strong wind. The surrounding ocean has a warming effect, making winters milder than the mainland. Consequently, there is very little snow on Chiburijima, and what snow does fall usually melts quickly.

=== Etymology of Chiburijima ===
Over time, Chiburijima has been written with various different kanji. These include the following, all of which are read "Chiburi": 知夫里, 知夫, 知夫利, 智夫, 道触 (see below), 知振, 千振, and 千波. There are two different theories regarding the name "Chiburi Island".

The first is that the name came from the name of a Shinto kami enshrined on Chiburijima's offshore isle, Watatsu Island (渡津島, Watatsu-jima). The god, named Chiburi no kami (道触の神), was a protector of ships. Since Chiburijima is the closest to the mainland of the Oki Islands, ships coming to and departing from Oki would stop on Chiburijima to ask the god for a safe voyage. Over time, the name "Chiburi" stuck and the island became known as "Chiburijima".

A second theory is that the name came from the use of smoke signals sent between Chiburijima and the mainland for communication. Since Chiburijima is the closest, it was the easiest to see between the Oki Islands and the mainland.

== History ==
The earliest evidence of human habitation of Chiburijima is the tomb called Himemiya Shrine Ruins (姫宮神社遺跡, Himemiya-jinja iseki) located in Urumi. The tomb is dated to the Jōmon period, 4000 years before present. Other ancient tombs built in the Yayoi (2300 BP) and Kofun (1700 BP) periods were also found. Also, the Oki Islands, including Chiburijima, are mentioned in Japan's two most ancient texts, Kojiki and Nihon Shoki. In the Asuka period, the area became incorporated into the "Chibu district" (知夫郡, Chibu-gun) encompassing both Chiburi Island and Nishinoshima. The islands have been used as a place of exile from the Nara period, but are well known as the place of exile for ex-Emperor Go-Toba, and Emperor Go-Daigo during the Kamakura period. After the Meiji Restoration, the Oki Islands became part of Tottori Prefecture in 1871, but were transferred to Shimane Prefecture in 1881.

Modern Chibu Village was established in 1909.

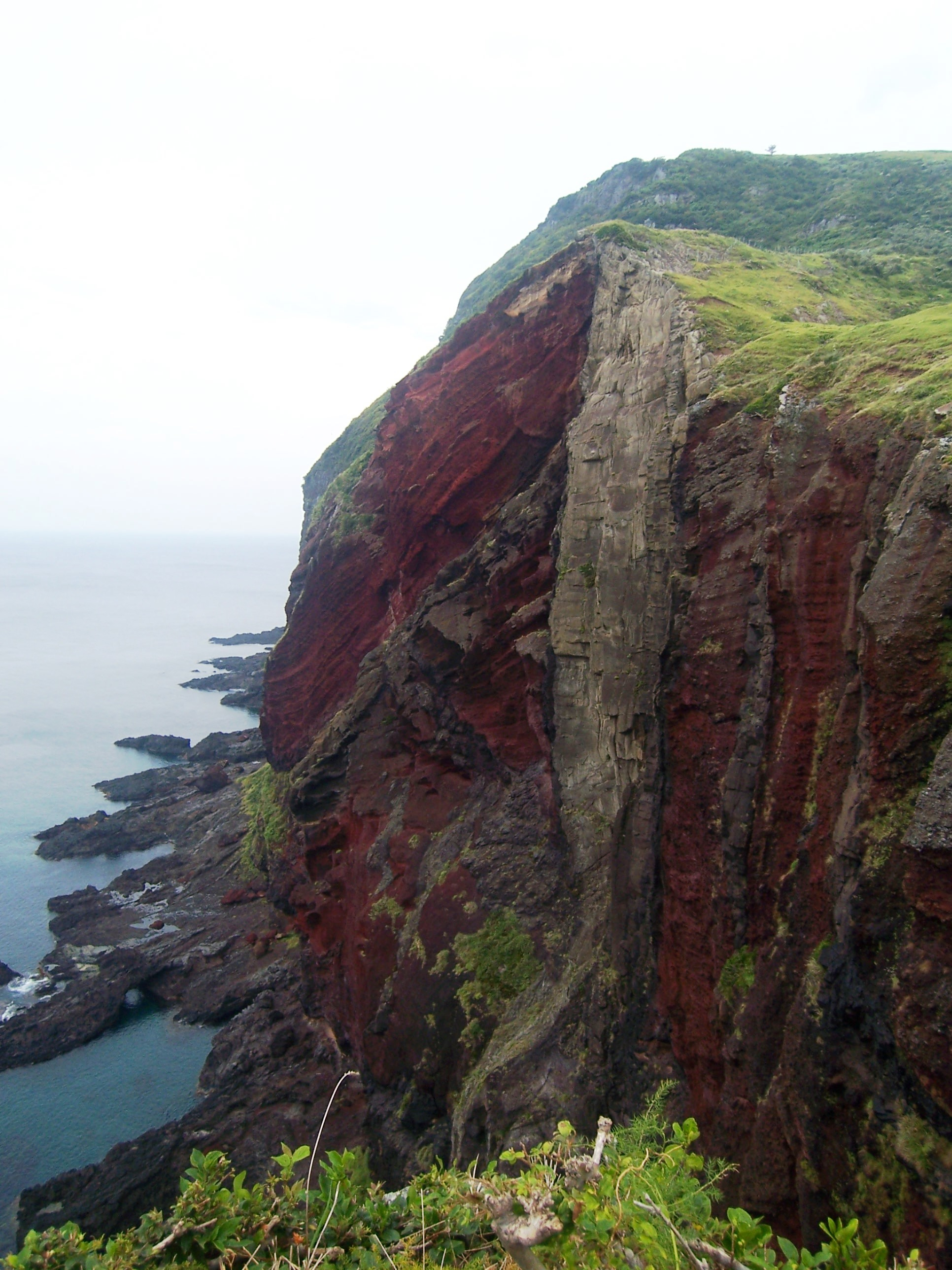
Red cliffs of Chiburijima

== Transportation ==
Chiburijima is connected by regular ferry service from Saigo Port on Dōgojima, as well as by direct ferry service to points on mainland Japan.

== Economy ==
The economy of the island is based on agriculture and commercial fishing. Seasonal tourism also plays a role in the local economy.
