= Oki Kokubun-ji =

Buddhist temple in Okinoshima, Japan

Oki Kokubun-ji 隠岐国分寺
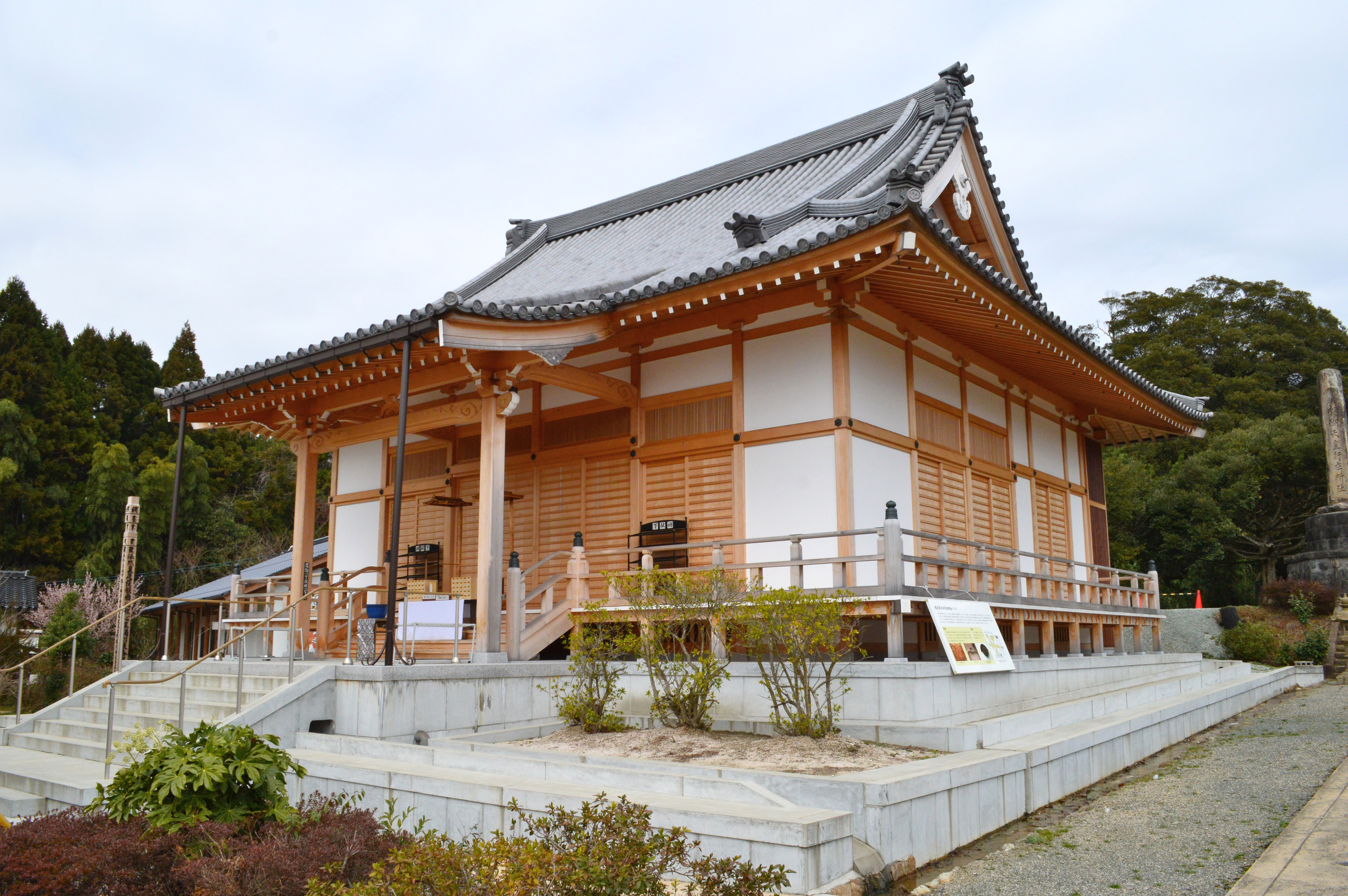
- Oki Kokubun-ji Main Hall

- Oki Kokubun-ji Oki Kokubun-ji (Japan)

Religion
- Affiliation: Buddhist
- Deity: Shaka Nyōrai
- Rite: Tōji Shingon-shū

Location
- Location: 5 Ikedafuro-mae, Okinoshima-cho, Oki-gun, Shimane-ken
- Country: Japan
- Coordinates: 36°13′27.65″N 133°18′26.52″E

Architecture
- Founder: Emperor Shōmu
- Completed: c.747
- National Historic Site of Japan

Oki Kokubun-ji (隠岐国分寺) is a Buddhist temple in the Ikedafuro neighborhood of the town of Okinoshima, Shimane Prefecture Japan. It belongs to the Tōji Shingon-sect, and its honzon is Shaka Nyōrai. It is the successor to one of provincial temples established by Emperor Shōmu during the Nara period (710 – 794). Due to this connection, the foundations of the Nara period temple which overlap the present day complex were designated as a National Historic Site in 1934, with the area under protection expanded in 2018. It is especially known for the Renge-emai dance (隠岐国分寺蓮華会舞), a rural bugaku performance with masks and costumes suggesting a Heian period origin, that is a National Intangible Folk Cultural Property) that is held every April 21.

== History ==
The Shoku Nihongi records that in 741, as the country recovered from a major smallpox epidemic, Emperor Shōmu ordered that a monastery and nunnery be established in every province, the kokubunji (国分寺). These temples were built to a semi-standardized template, and served both to spread Buddhist orthodoxy to the provinces, and to emphasize the power of the Nara period centralized government under the Ritsuryō system.

The Oki Kokubun-ji is located on the northern hills of Yabihei-ya, the largest plain on Dōgojima, the main island of the Oki Islands. The Tairajinja Kofun, the largest in the Oki Islands, is located near this temple, and the area has long been the center of the Oki region. The exact date of its founding is unknown, but it s believed to have been built around the time of the imperial edict for the construction of Kokubunji temples in 741. According to the entry for May 26, 867 in the Nihon Sandai Jitsuroku, statues of the Four Heavenly Kings were sent to the five provinces close to Silla: Hoki, Izumo, Iwami, Oki, and Nagato, and they were ordered to be set up training halls to subjugate Silla and four monks from the Kokubunji temples were assigned to perform rituals. In the case of Oki, the statues of the Four Heavenly Kings were enshrined within the grounds of Oki Kokubun-ji. Per the Engishiki, enacted in 927, tax regulations were enacted which assigned 5,000 bundles of rice as the tax for the upkeep of Oki Kokubun-ji temple. Most of the kokubunji temples throughout the country fell into decline after the Heian period, but the Oki Kokubun-ji continued.

At the end of the Kamakura period, Emperor Go-Daigo, who was defeated in the Genkō War in 1332, was exiled to the Oki Islands, and (per the temple's legend), made the Oki Kokubun-ji his temporary residence. This is also stated in the Masukagami, which states that when the Emperor was exiled to Oki Island, "He was residing in a temple called Kokubun-ji, a little way in from the coast, in a place where he was kindly taken care of." Other contemporary documents indicate that Emperor Go-Daigo was issuing imperial decrees from his residence at Oki Kokubun-ji; however, the Kuroki Palace in Nishinoshima, is also known as Emperor Go-Daigo's temporary residence, so the issue is uncertain.

In 1457, the shugo (military governor), Kyōgoku Mochikiyo, instructed the chief priest of Oki Kokubun-ji to exempt his vassal from paying tax on the temple's land. The main hall of the temple was rebuilt by the shugodai Oki Munekiyo in 1499, but the temple was already in decline. In the Kan'ei era (1624–1644) if the Edo period, the temple is listed as having estates of five koku for its upkeep.

In the Meiji period, due to the government's anti-Buddhist movement, Oki Kokubun-ji was abandoned in 1870 after its main hall and three-story pagoda burned down in 1869. The temple was rebuilt in 1879, and its Main Hall was rebuilt in 1950; however, this structure burned down in 2007. This provided an opportunity for an archaeological excavation of the temple's grounds from 2009 until the main hall was rebuilt in 2014.

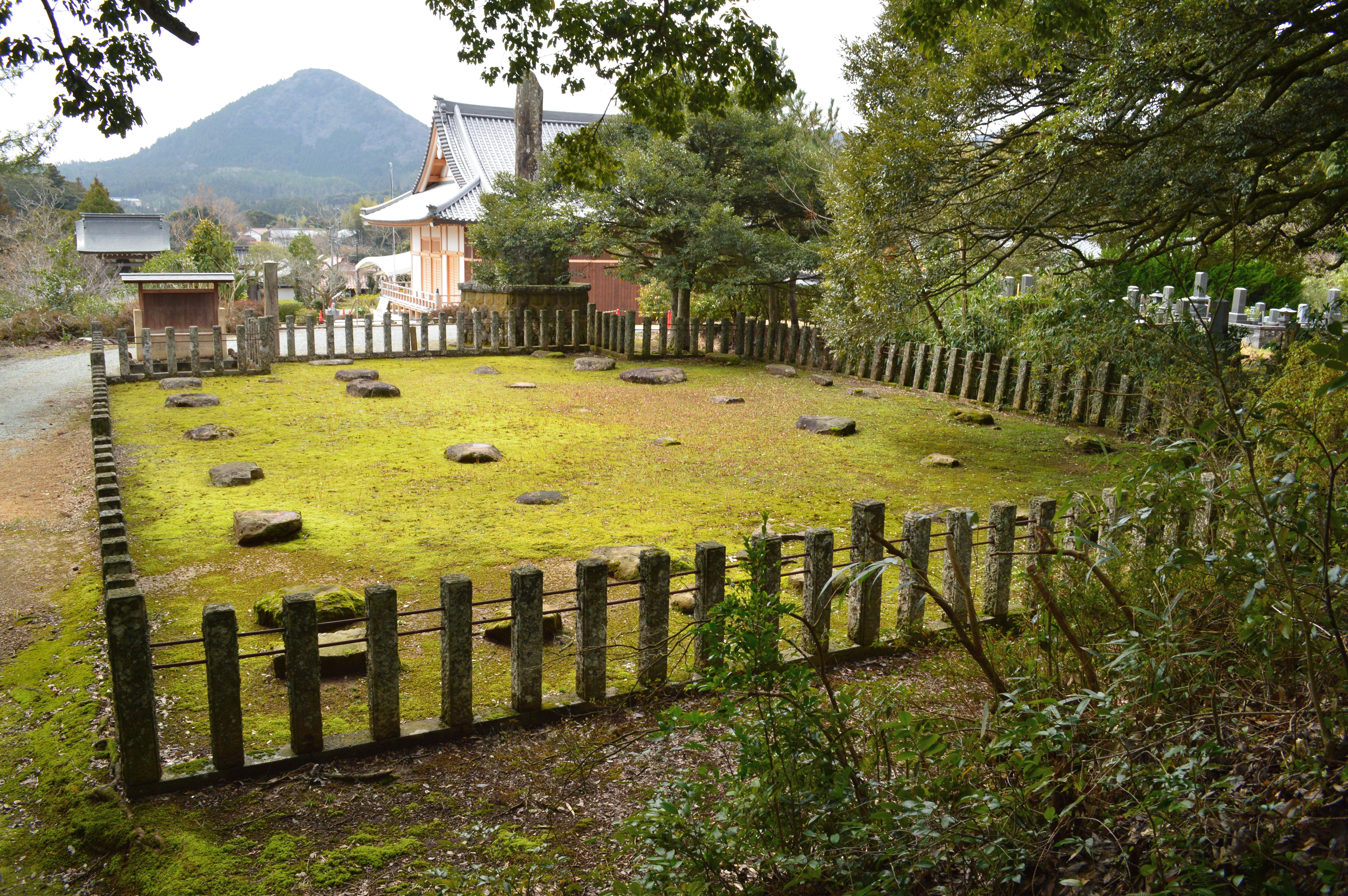
Site of the Main Hall

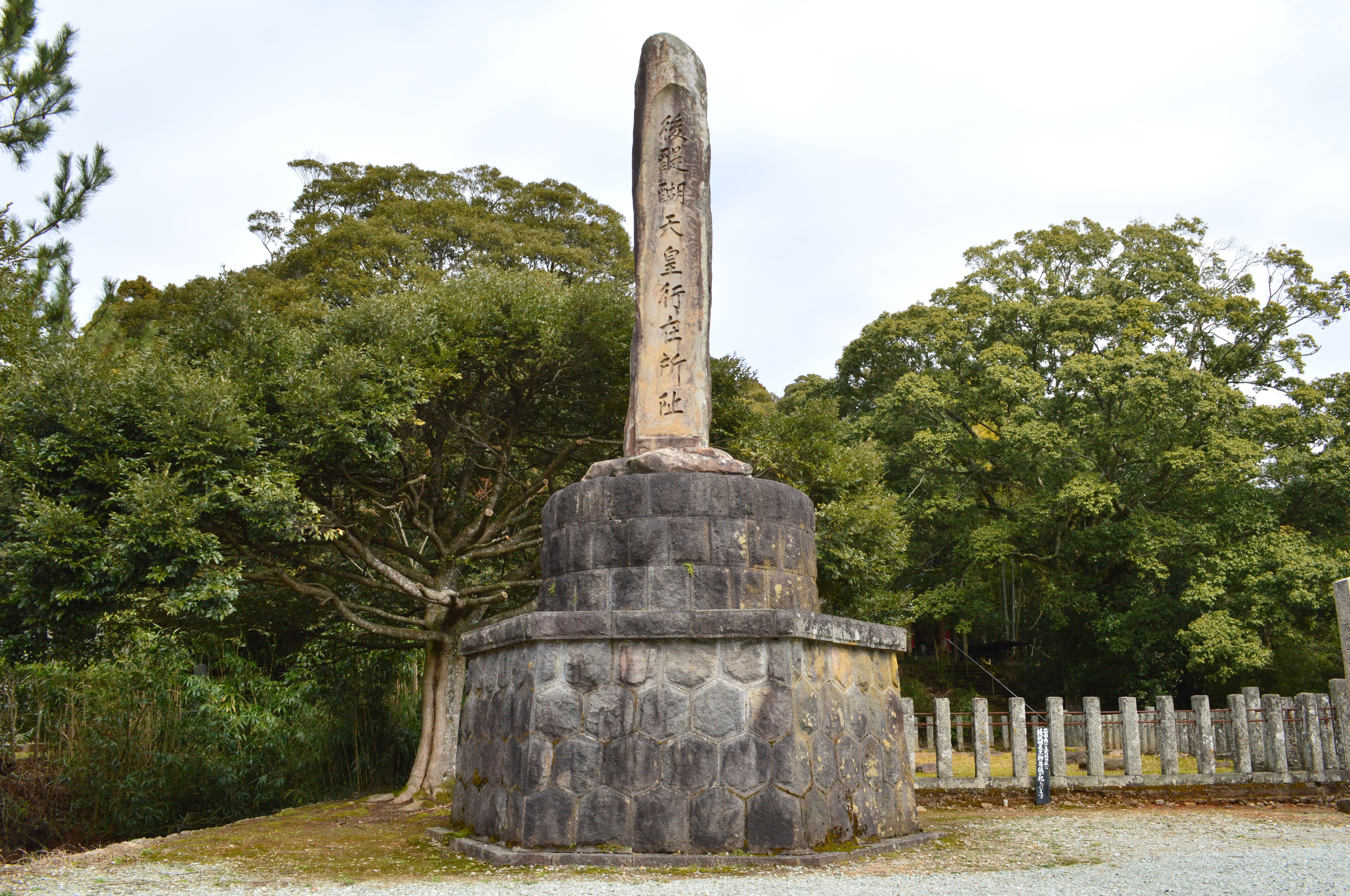
Monument to Emperor Go-Daigo

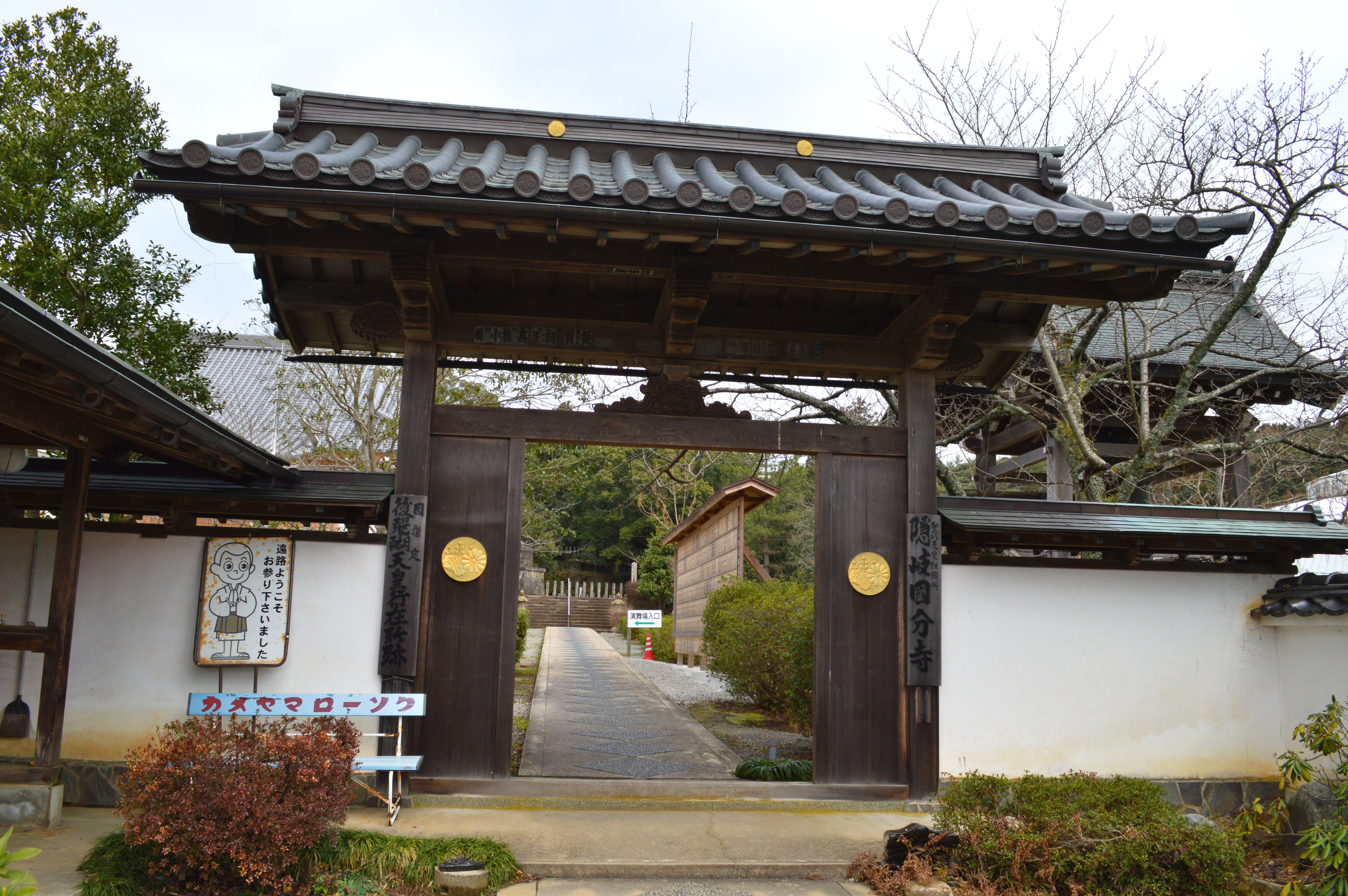
Sanmon

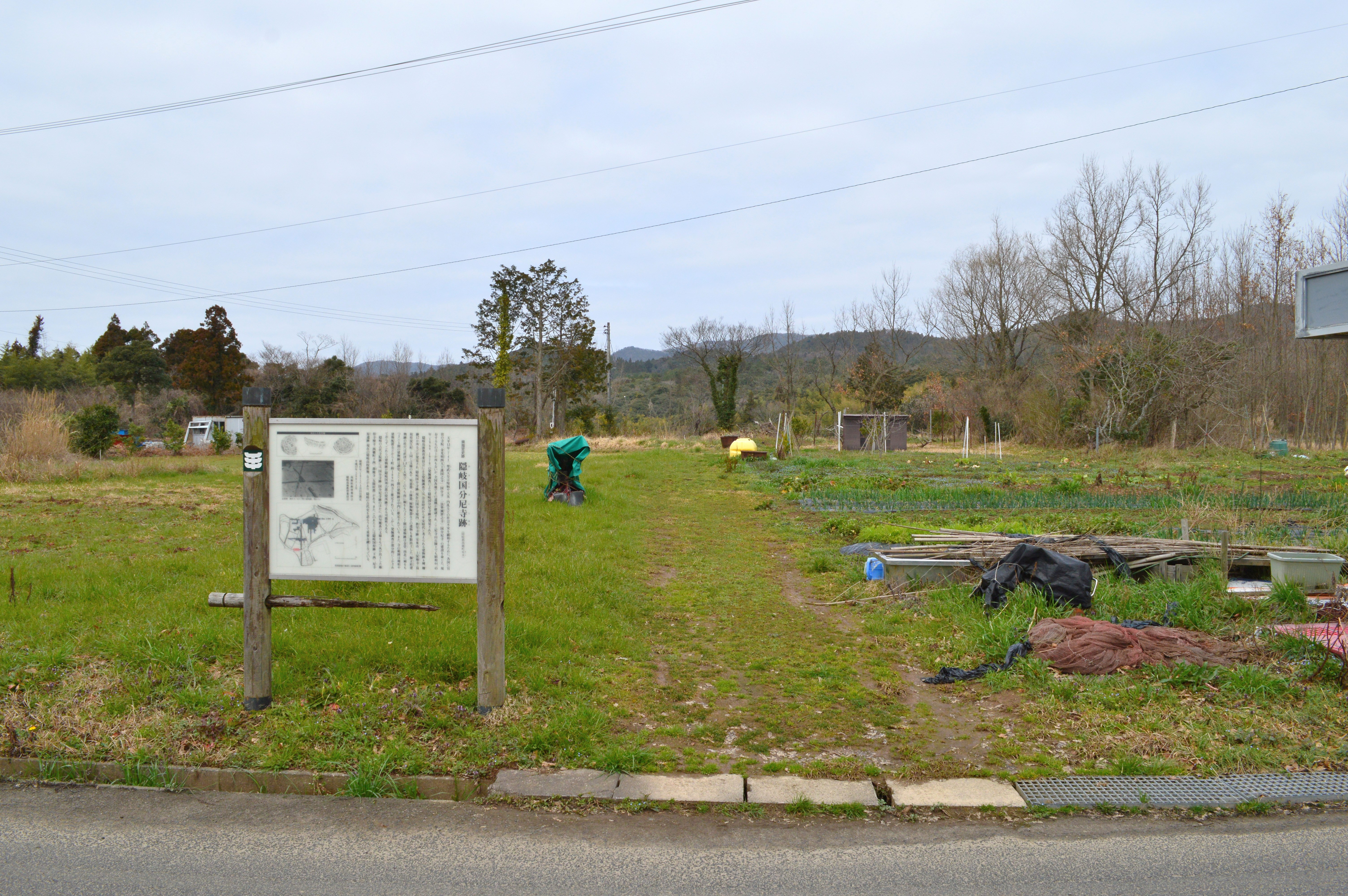
Oki Kokubun-niji site

== Oki Kokubun-niji ==
The site of the Oki Kokubun-nji nunnery is located about 500 meters to the southeast, and was excavated from 1969 to 1970. It is designated as a Shimane Prefecture Historic Site. The temple grounds are estimated to be 1 chō (approximately 109 meters square), and excavations have uncovered the remains of six buildings, 12 fences, four ditch-like structures, and a pile of roof tiles. Among the remains of the buildings, a 3×7-bay building with a south-facing eaves, a 3×5-bay building with north–south eaves, and a 2×1-bay building are thought to be the main hall, lecture hall, and inner gate, respectively. However, as the main hall and lecture hall are lined up east to west, which is different from the usual layout of temple buildings, there is another theory that it was a government office complex.

== See also ==
- List of Historic Sites of Japan (Shimane)
- provincial temple
