= Nakanoshima (disambiguation) =

Nakanoshima (中之島、中の島、中ノ島、中野島) may refer to:

- Nakanoshima, a sandbank in central Osaka, Japan
  - Nakanoshima Park on the sandbank
- Nakanoshima (Kagoshima), a volcanic island in the Tokara Islands of Kagoshima Prefecture, Japan
- Nakanoshima (Shimane), an island in the Oki Islands of Shimane Prefecture, Japan
- Nakanoshima, Niigata, Japan, a former town
- A district in Tama-ku, Kawasaki

== See also ==
- Nakanoshima Station (disambiguation)
