= Nishinoshima =

Nishinoshima (also spelt nishino-shima and nishi-no-shima), meaning "western island", may refer to several places in Japan, both actual islands or municipalities:

- Nishinoshima, Shimane, town located on the island of Nishinoshima (Shimane)
- Nishinoshima (Shimane), one of the Dōzen Islands in the Oki archipelago
- Nishinoshima (Ogasawara), volcanic island 940 km south of Tokyo that is part of the Volcano Islands archipelago
