= Nishinoshima (Shimane) =

Dōzen Island in the Oki archipelago in the Sea of Japan

Native name: 西ノ島, Nishinoshima
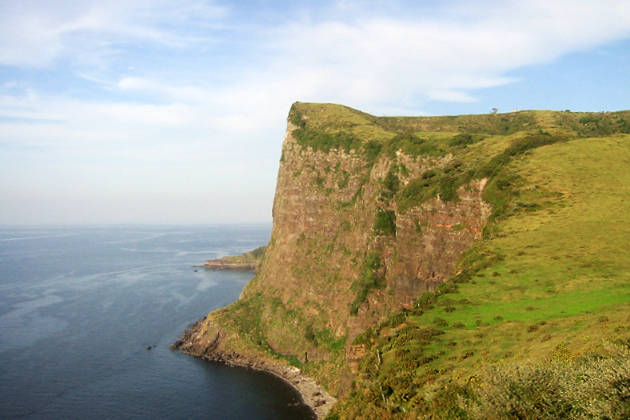
- Kuniga Coast on Nishinoshima

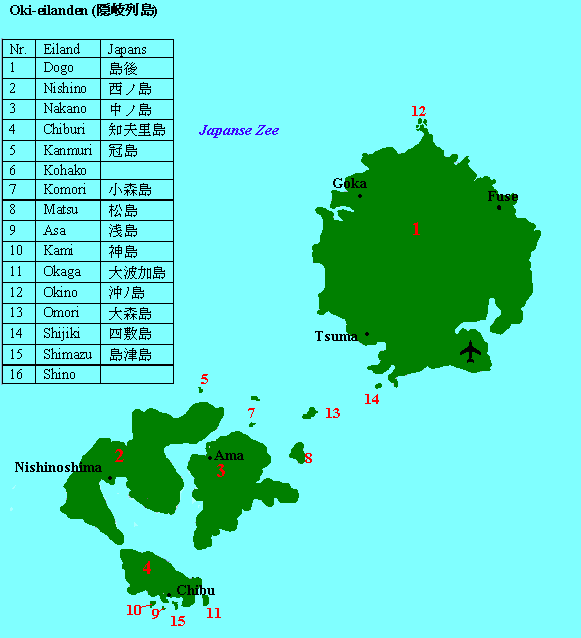

Geography
- Location: Sea of Japan
- Coordinates: 36°6′N 133°00′E
- Archipelago: Oki Islands
- Area: 55.97 km^{2} (21.61 sq mi)
- Coastline: 117 km (72.7 mi)
- Highest elevation: 452 m (1483 ft)
- Highest point: Takuhiyama

Administration
- Japan
- Prefectures: Shimane Prefecture
- District: Oki District
- Town: Nishinoshima

Demographics
- Population: 3,400 (2013)
- Ethnic groups: Japanese

Nishinoshima (西ノ島, also Nishi-no-shima) is one of the Dōzen Islands in the Oki archipelago in the Sea of Japan. It is the second largest island of the Oki Islands.

The island, 55.97 km² in area, has a population of approximately 3,400 persons. The island is administered by the town of Nishinoshima in Shimane Prefecture. Much of the island is within the borders of Daisen-Oki National Park.

== Geography ==
Nishinoshima is located approximately 65 kilometres (35 nmi) northeast of the Honshu coast. The island is of volcanic origin, with a deeply indented coastline of 117 kilometres (73 mi), and with its highest point at the peak of Takuhiyama 452 metres (1,483 ft) above sea level. The Matengai cliffs on the west coast of the island are the highest in Japan, at 257 metres (843 ft).

The climate of Nishinoshima is classified as a humid subtropical climate (Köppen climate classification Cfa) with very warm summers and cool winters. Precipitation is abundant throughout the year.

== History ==
The Oki Islands have been inhabited since the Japanese Paleolithic era, and numerous artifacts from the Jōmon, Yayoi and Kofun periods have been found by archaeologists.

Nishinoshima was used as a place of exile from the Nara period, but is well known as a place of exile for Emperor Godaigo and a possible place of exile for ex-Emperor Go-Toba (a distinction which it shares with neighboring Nakanoshima.) The island became part of the holdings under the control of Matsue Domain under the Tokugawa shogunate in the Edo period.

After the Meiji restoration, the Oki Islands became part of Tottori Prefecture in 1871, but were transferred to Shimane Prefecture in 1881.

The island was divided between Urago Village in the west and Kuroki Village in the east in 1904. The two municipalities were divided by a canal in 1915, which cut the island into two parts. Urago became a town in November 1946 and merged with Kuroki in 1957 to form Nishinoshima Town. The two portions of the island were joined together by a bridge in 2005.

== Transportation ==
Nishinoshima is connected by regular ferry service from Saigo Port on Dōgo Island, as well to Nakanoshima. There is no direct ferry service to mainland Japan.

== Economy ==
The economy of the island is based on agriculture and commercial fishing. Seasonal tourism also plays a role in the local economy.
