= Inshū =

Inshū or Inshu may refer to:

- Inshū (因州)
  - Inshū, another name for Inaba Province.
- Inshū (隠州), also called Onshū.
  - Inshū, another name for Oki Province.
