= Chibu, Shimane =

Chibu 知夫村
- Village
- Flag Seal

- Location of Chibu in Shimane Prefecture

- Location of Chibu in Japan
- Coordinates: 36°0′51.14″N 133°2′22.55″E
- Country: Japan
- Region: Chūgoku; San'in
- Prefecture: Shimane Prefecture
- District: Oki
- Settled: 2000 BCE
- Incorporated (district): 600 CE
- Incorporated (village): 600 CE
- Neighborhoods: List: Kōri (郡); Nibu (仁夫); Ōe (大江); Tataku (多沢); Usuge (薄毛); Kurii (来居); Urumi (古海)

Area
  - Total: 13.70 km^{2} (5.29 sq mi)
  - Land: 13.70 km^{2} (5.29 sq mi)
- Highest elevation: 325 m (1,066 ft)

Population (2010)
  - Total: 657
  - Estimate (March 2011): 656
  - Density: 48.0/km^{2} (124/sq mi)
- Time zone: UTC+9 (Japan Standard Time)
- Postal code: 684-0100
- Phone: 08514-8-2211
- Address: 1065 Kōri, Chibu-mura, Oki-gun, Shimane-ken 684-0102
- Address (Japanese): 〒684-0102島根県隠岐郡知夫村郡1065番地
- Website: www.vill.chibu.lg.jp

Chibu (知夫村, Chibu-mura, Chibu-son) is a village located on Chiburijima (知夫里島) in the Dōzen group of islands in the Oki District, Shimane Prefecture, Japan. Chibu is the only village remaining in Shimane Prefecture as of October 1, 2005. As of Japan's 2010 census, the village has a population of 657 people, constituting 326 households, and a population density of about 48 persons per km^{2}. This is a decrease of 68 people (9.4%) from the previous census conducted in 2005. A population estimate from March 2011 placed Chibu's population at 656 people, 334 men and 322 women.

== Geography ==
Chibu is located on Chiburijima (知夫里島), the smallest of the Dōzen group of islands, and includes 18 smaller uninhabited islands located nearby waters. The Dōzen islands were formed from a single ancient volcanic island. The caldera of the volcano collapsed, leaving three main islands in a ring formation.

=== Climate ===
Located on an island located in the Sea of Japan, Chibu is within the Sea of Japan climate zone. Summer temperatures, though usually mild, are exacerbated by high humidity. Winter temperatures are also generally mild, though exacerbated by strong wind. The surrounding ocean has a warming effect, making winters milder than the mainland. Consequently, there is very little snow in Chibu, and what snow does fall usually melts quickly.

The nearest weather station is located in Ama on the nearby island of Nakanoshima. Chibu's average annual high and low temperatures are 17.6 °C (64 °F) and 10.5 °C (51 °F), with yearly mean of 14.4 °C (58 °F). The record high and low temperatures are 34.9 °C (95 °F) and -2.9 °C (27 °F) respectively. The average yearly humidity is 76%. Chibu receives an average of 1,662 mm (65.43 in) of precipitation a year.

== History ==
Chibujima was composed of 7 hamlets: Kōri (郡), Nibu (仁夫), Ōe (大江), Tataku (多沢), Usuge (薄毛), Kurii (来居), and Urumi (古海), which were united to form Chibu Village in 1909. The village is served by a sea port located in Kurii which provides ship transportation among the three islands of the Dozen group, to Okinoshima, and to the mainland. There is also a heliport for medical emergencies.

Climate data for Village of Chibu (1979-2000)
Month	Jan	Feb	Mar	Apr	May	Jun	Jul	Aug	Sep	Oct	Nov	Dec	Year
Record high °C (°F)	17.2 (63.0)	19.0 (66.2)	22.9 (73.2)	26.2 (79.2)	30.4 (86.7)	31.0 (87.8)	33.8 (92.8)	34.9 (94.8)	32.9 (91.2)	30.0 (86.0)	23.3 (73.9)	18.6 (65.5)	34.9 (94.8)
Mean daily maximum °C (°F)	7.5 (45.5)	7.3 (45.1)	10.5 (50.9)	15.8 (60.4)	20.2 (68.4)	23.5 (74.3)	26.8 (80.2)	28.9 (84.0)	25.1 (77.2)	20.3 (68.5)	15.3 (59.5)	10.5 (50.9)	17.6 (63.7)
Daily mean °C (°F)	4.9 (40.8)	4.5 (40.1)	7.1 (44.8)	12.0 (53.6)	16.4 (61.5)	20.2 (68.4)	24.1 (75.4)	25.8 (78.4)	21.6 (70.9)	16.3 (61.3)	11.8 (53.2)	7.6 (45.7)	14.4 (57.9)
Mean daily minimum °C (°F)	1.8 (35.2)	1.0 (33.8)	2.7 (36.9)	7.3 (45.1)	12.1 (53.8)	16.8 (62.2)	21.4 (70.5)	22.5 (72.5)	17.7 (63.9)	11.7 (53.1)	7.4 (45.3)	3.8 (38.8)	10.5 (50.9)
Record low °C (°F)	−0.6 (30.9)	−2.9 (26.8)	2.3 (36.1)	6.0 (42.8)	11.8 (53.2)	15.6 (60.1)	19.3 (66.7)	21.4 (70.5)	17.9 (64.2)	10.9 (51.6)	6.3 (43.3)	1.5 (34.7)	−2.9 (26.8)
Average precipitation mm (inches)	115.5 (4.55)	96.4 (3.80)	104.3 (4.11)	105.2 (4.14)	131.0 (5.16)	171.9 (6.77)	227.0 (8.94)	124.0 (4.88)	211.0 (8.31)	107.4 (4.23)	121.7 (4.79)	123.8 (4.87)	1,662 (65.43)
Average precipitation days	5.25	4.38	4.74	4.48	5.95	7.81	10.32	5.53	9.59	4.88	5.53	5.63	75.5
Average relative humidity (%)	72	72	72	73	75	82	84	81	80	75	73	72	76
Mean monthly sunshine hours	54.3	67.5	123.4	181.1	198.8	140.2	156.8	210.3	140.8	141.1	91.4	68.4	1,574.5
Source 1: JMA Ama Station
Source 2: JMA Saigo Station

== Culture ==
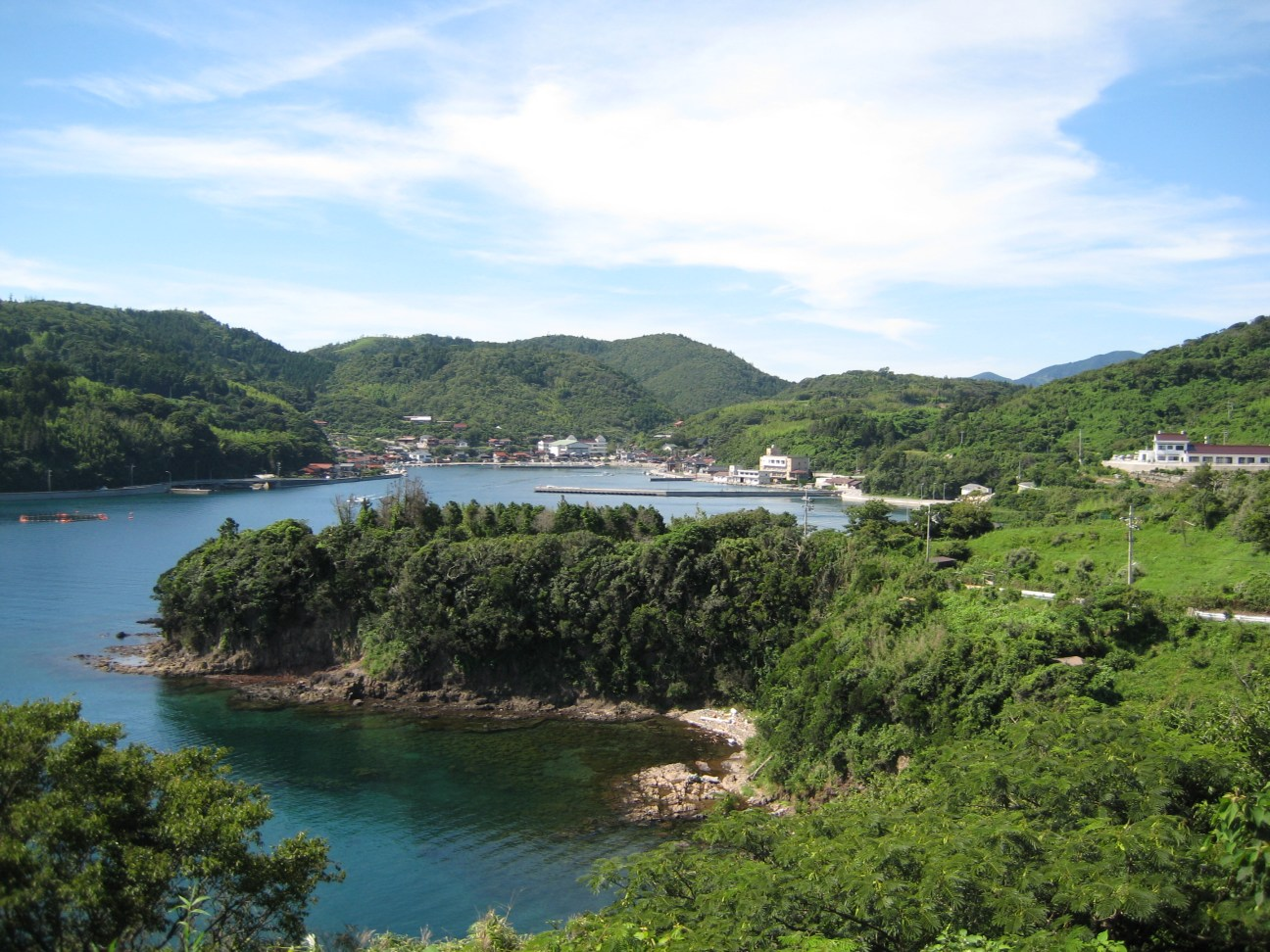
The main populated area of Chibu

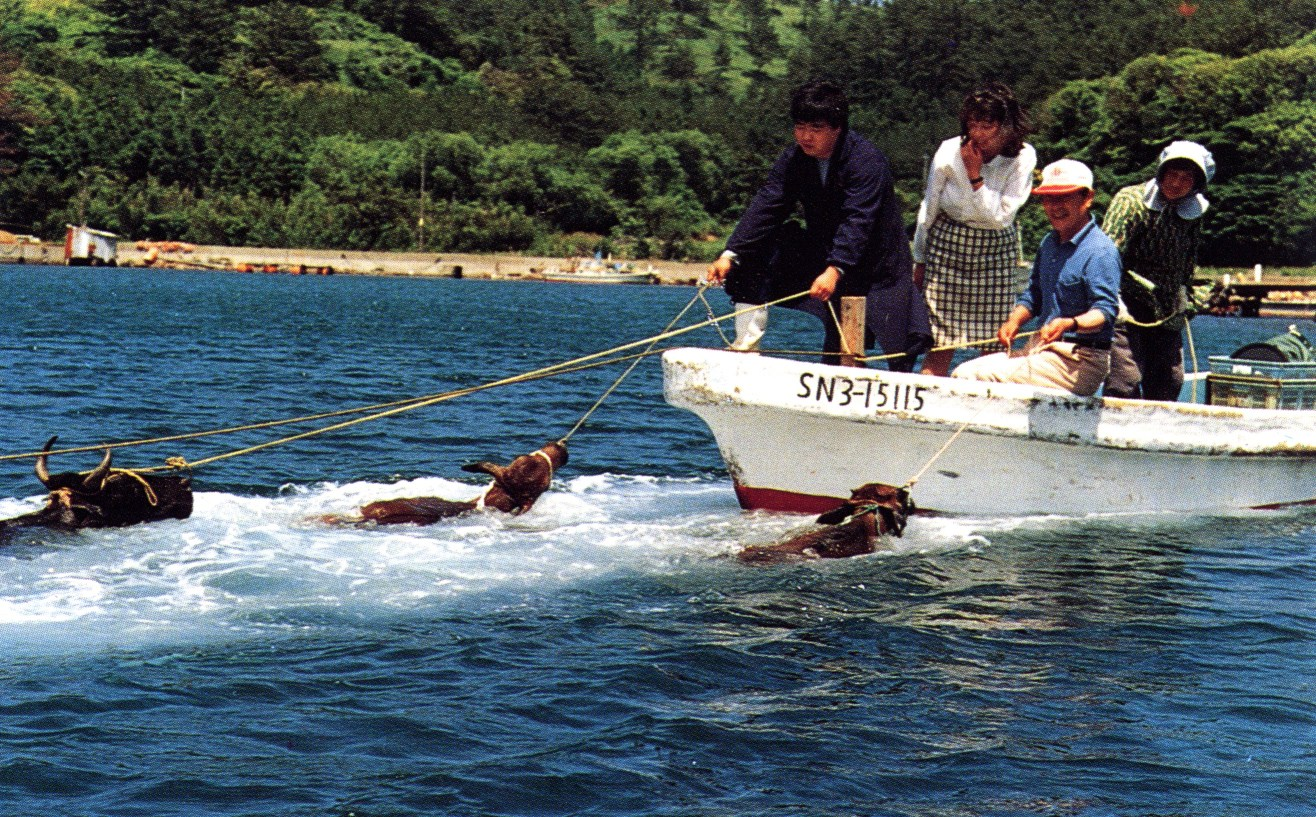
”Swimming cows” are a kind of tourist attraction. The cows are pulled out into the water and released. They then swim back to the shore.

=== Festivals and events ===
Amasashi hiko no mikoto jinja reisai (天佐志比古命神社例祭)
is a festival held bi-annually, usually at the end of July. This festival is common throughout Japan, and the main event is carrying a mikoshi through the town. The home temple for this is Chibu's Ikū Shrine (一宮神社, Ikū-jinja). Another common event during this festival is kodomo kabuki, or children's kabuki. Chibu's tradition has it that there was once a serious sickness on Chibu, and, after it passed, dances and kabuki were performed by children in celebration.

Bunkasai (文化祭) and Undō no hi (運動の日)
are common events throughout Japan usually held in November and October, respectively. In many other places, towns and schools may hold their own separate events. However, in Chibu the village and school combine because of the small population.

Jyamaki (蛇巻き)
is an event that, like Odaishi-san mawari, was more common in the past, but is less common now. A rope (or “snake”) is braided from dried rice-straw, and wrapped around a tree. This for good luck in the year's harvest, and usually is done in the fall.

Minna ichi taiko (皆一太鼓)
is a small traditional festival not unique to Chibu held in October for good luck in the harvest and safety for marine vessels. Drums are played and a dance is performed to send luck to the town.

Nodaikon matsuri (野大根祭り)
is a festival held in April for a beef-cattle show and to kick off the tourist season. Typical events in the festival are a cow show, karaoke contest, performances by elementary and kindergarten children, local folk songs called min'yō (民謡), and occasionally hired music talent. Festival food is also sold such as Oki beef, oysters, and yakisoba .

Odaishi-san mawari (お大師さん回り)
is a festival that was celebrated commonly across Japan in the past, but is recently becoming rarer. In the past, a famous monk named Kōbō-Daishi traveled throughout Japan and founded many temples. The festival started as a way for people to "copy" him by visiting various small temples in their town. Usually food is available at each location for visitors. The food is made by married women who often start preparing the food early in the morning. In Chibu, this festival is usually held in April.

== In popular culture ==
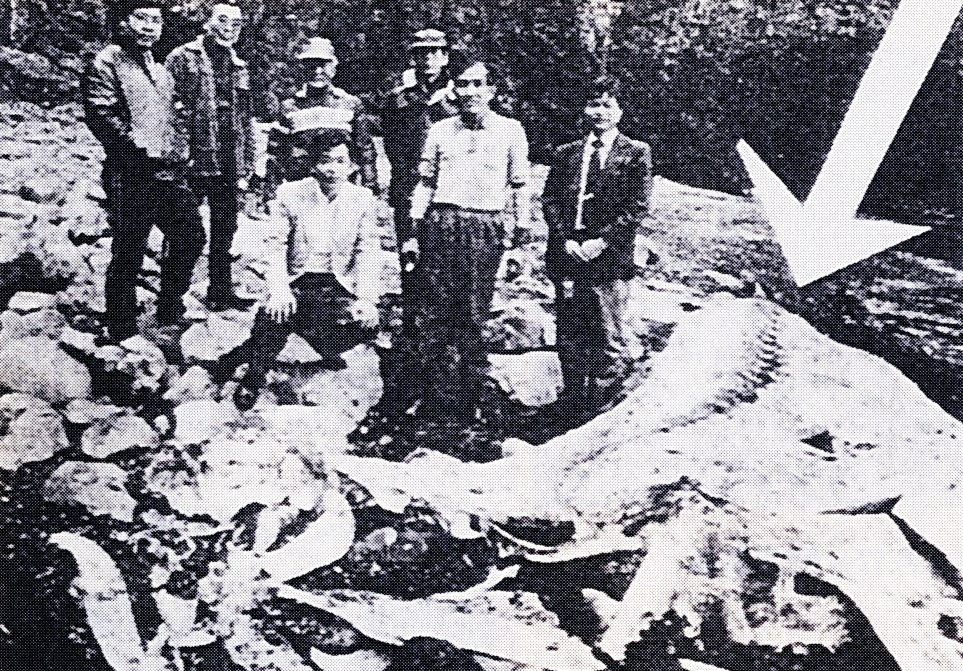
Chisshī, a beached basking shark that was named after Nessy.

- In April 1982 a basking shark (ウバザメ, ubazame) washed up on Chibu, and was identified by a professor of zoology from Kyoto University. It was 6.8m long and 1.7m wide, with a "neck-like thing" 1.5m long. People named it Chisshī (チッシー) after Nessy, and called the event the "Chisshī Disturbance" (チッシー騒動, Chisshī sōdō)
- In 2008, Chibu was featured in an NHK television drama called Dandan (だんだん).

== See also ==
- List of fishing villages
