= Ama, Shimane =

Ama 海士町
- Town
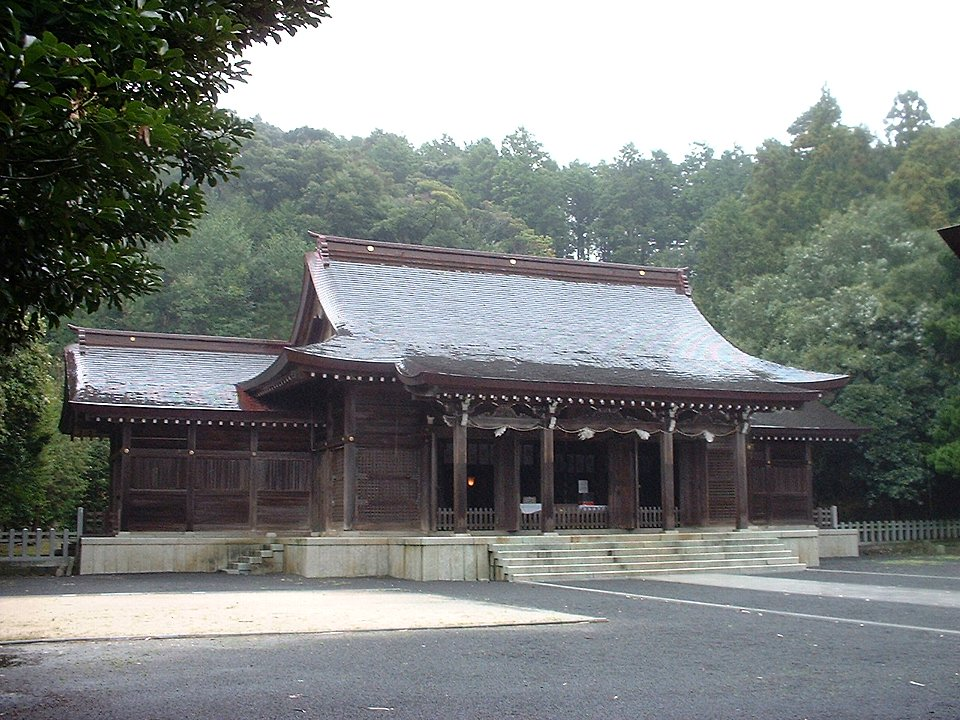
- Oki Shrine

- Flag Seal

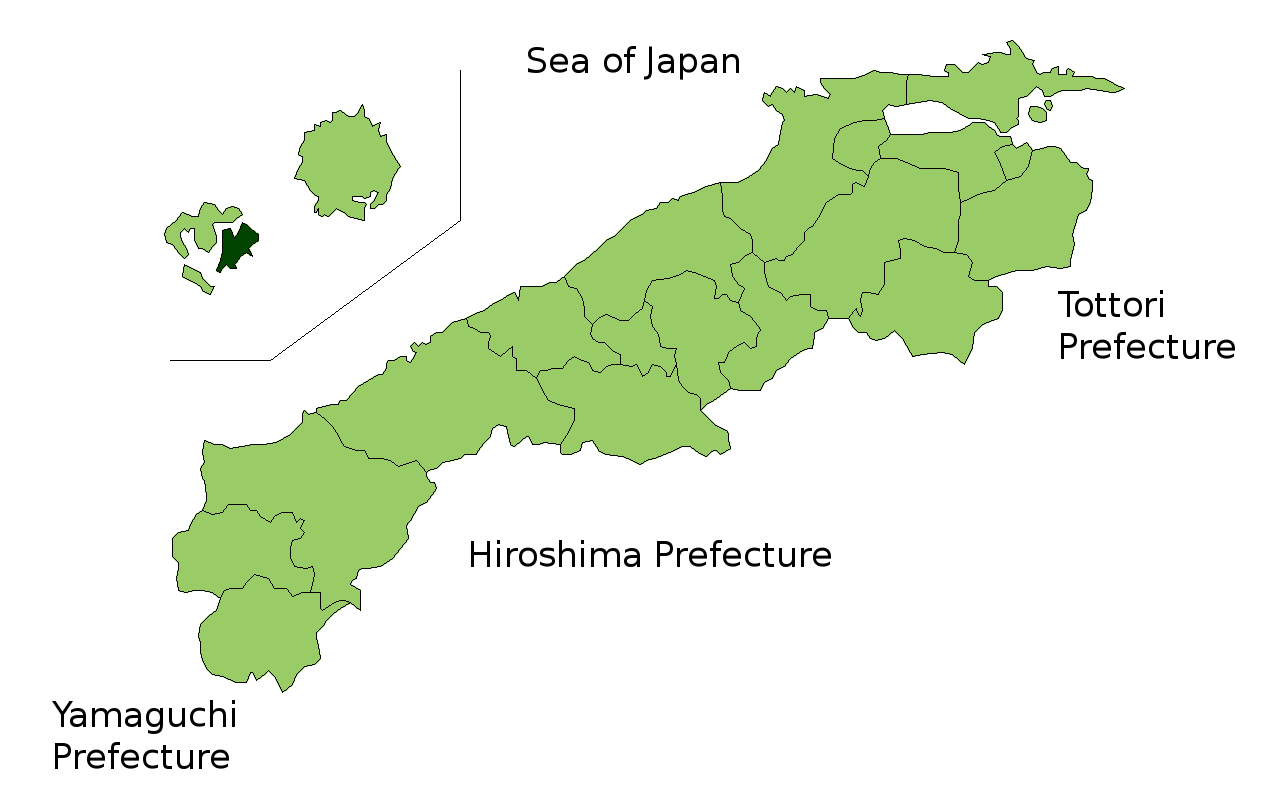
- Location of Ama in Shimane Prefecture

- Coordinates: 36°6′N 133°6′E
- Country: Japan
- Region: Chūgoku; San'in
- Prefecture: Shimane Prefecture
- District: Oki

Government
  - -Mayor: Michio Yamauchi

Area
  - Total: 33.50 km^{2} (12.93 sq mi)

Population (October 1, 2020)
  - Total: 2,267
  - Density: 67.67/km^{2} (175.3/sq mi)
- Time zone: UTC+9 (Japan Standard Time)
- Phone number: 08514-2-0111
- Address: 1490 Ama, Ama-machi, Oki-gun, Shimane-ken 684-0403
- Climate: Cfa
- Website: www.town.ama.shimane.jp

Ama (海士町, Ama-chō) is a town located on Nakanoshima, in Oki District, Shimane Prefecture, Japan.

As of 1 October 2020, the town had an estimated population of 2,267 and a population density of 68 persons per km^{2}. The total area was 33.50 km^{2} (13 mi^{2}).

== History ==
Ama was part of the ancient Oki Province, and the island consisted of a single district, also called Ama, and three villages. Emperor Go-Toba, defeated in the Jōkyū War in 1221, was exiled to the Oki Islands, and lived in Ama for 19 years until his death in 1239. Oki Shrine was built in 1939 to commemorate the 700th year of his death.

== Geography ==
Ama occupies all of the island of Nakanoshima, in the Oki Islands archipelago in the Sea of Japan, along with a number of offshore uninhabited islands and rocks. Much of the island is within the borders of Daisen-Oki National Park.

=== Climate ===
Ama has a humid subtropical climate (Köppen climate classification Cfa) with very warm summers and cool winters. Precipitation is abundant throughout the year. The average annual temperature in Ama is 14.9 °C (58.8 °F). The average annual rainfall is 1,589.3 mm (62.57 in) with July as the wettest month. The temperatures are highest on average in August, at around 26.3 °C (79.3 °F), and lowest in February, at around 5.2 °C (41.4 °F). The highest temperature ever recorded in Ama was 35.9 °C (96.6 °F) on 5 August 2010; the coldest temperature ever recorded was −8.0 °C (17.6 °F) on 27 February 1981.

Climate data for Ama (1991−2020 normals, extremes 1978−present)
Month	Jan	Feb	Mar	Apr	May	Jun	Jul	Aug	Sep	Oct	Nov	Dec	Year
Record high °C (°F)	17.3 (63.1)	21.9 (71.4)	23.6 (74.5)	26.6 (79.9)	30.4 (86.7)	31.6 (88.9)	35.4 (95.7)	35.9 (96.6)	35.0 (95.0)	30.5 (86.9)	25.6 (78.1)	20.1 (68.2)	35.9 (96.6)
Mean daily maximum °C (°F)	8.2 (46.8)	8.7 (47.7)	11.7 (53.1)	16.8 (62.2)	21.3 (70.3)	24.6 (76.3)	28.2 (82.8)	30.1 (86.2)	26.3 (79.3)	21.4 (70.5)	16.3 (61.3)	11.0 (51.8)	18.7 (65.7)
Daily mean °C (°F)	5.3 (41.5)	5.2 (41.4)	7.8 (46.0)	12.5 (54.5)	17.1 (62.8)	20.7 (69.3)	24.8 (76.6)	26.3 (79.3)	22.3 (72.1)	17.1 (62.8)	12.3 (54.1)	7.8 (46.0)	14.9 (58.9)
Mean daily minimum °C (°F)	1.6 (34.9)	1.0 (33.8)	2.9 (37.2)	7.3 (45.1)	12.6 (54.7)	17.2 (63.0)	21.9 (71.4)	22.9 (73.2)	18.3 (64.9)	12.3 (54.1)	7.7 (45.9)	3.8 (38.8)	10.8 (51.4)
Record low °C (°F)	−6.6 (20.1)	−8.0 (17.6)	−4.7 (23.5)	−3.3 (26.1)	2.8 (37.0)	7.6 (45.7)	11.4 (52.5)	14.2 (57.6)	6.1 (43.0)	1.9 (35.4)	−0.7 (30.7)	−2.7 (27.1)	−8.0 (17.6)
Average precipitation mm (inches)	116.9 (4.60)	86.4 (3.40)	108.6 (4.28)	107.5 (4.23)	125.7 (4.95)	167.0 (6.57)	203.7 (8.02)	141.6 (5.57)	197.8 (7.79)	97.7 (3.85)	105.8 (4.17)	126.7 (4.99)	1,589.3 (62.57)
Average precipitation days (≥ 1.0 mm)	17.0	13.3	11.9	8.7	8.2	9.1	10.4	8.4	9.6	8.9	11.5	17.3	134.3
Mean monthly sunshine hours	70.9	93.4	157.9	204.6	215.2	156.1	161.5	213.2	164.8	163.6	110.2	78.5	1,790
Source: Japan Meteorological Agency

=== Demographics ===
Ama came under the control of the Matsue Domain in the Edo period, and was divided into seven villages. After the Meiji restoration, the Oki Islands became part of Tottori Prefecture in 1871, but were transferred to Shimane Prefecture in 1881. Ama Village was established in 1904. Its population peaked in 1950 with 6,986 inhabitants, and has declined ever since. It was raised to town status on January 1, 1969.

Historical population
Year	Pop.	±%
1920	6,001	—
1925	5,478	−8.7%
1930	5,308	−3.1%
1935	5,048	−4.9%
1940	4,748	−5.9%
1945	6,705	+41.2%
1950	6,986	+4.2%
1955	6,678	−4.4%
1960	6,160	−7.8%
1965	5,145	−16.5%
1970	4,257	−17.3%
1975	3,809	−10.5%
1980	3,537	−7.1%
1985	3,339	−5.6%
1990	3,119	−6.6%
1995	2,857	−8.4%
2000	2,672	−6.5%
2005	2,581	−3.4%
2010	2,377	−7.9%
2015	2,353	−1.0%
2020	2,267	−3.7%
Ama population statistics

== Economy ==
The town economy is primarily based on agriculture and commercial fishing.

== Notable people from Ama ==
- Misako Tanaka – actress
