= Mount Hōbutsu =

Mountain in the country of Japan

- 宝仏山
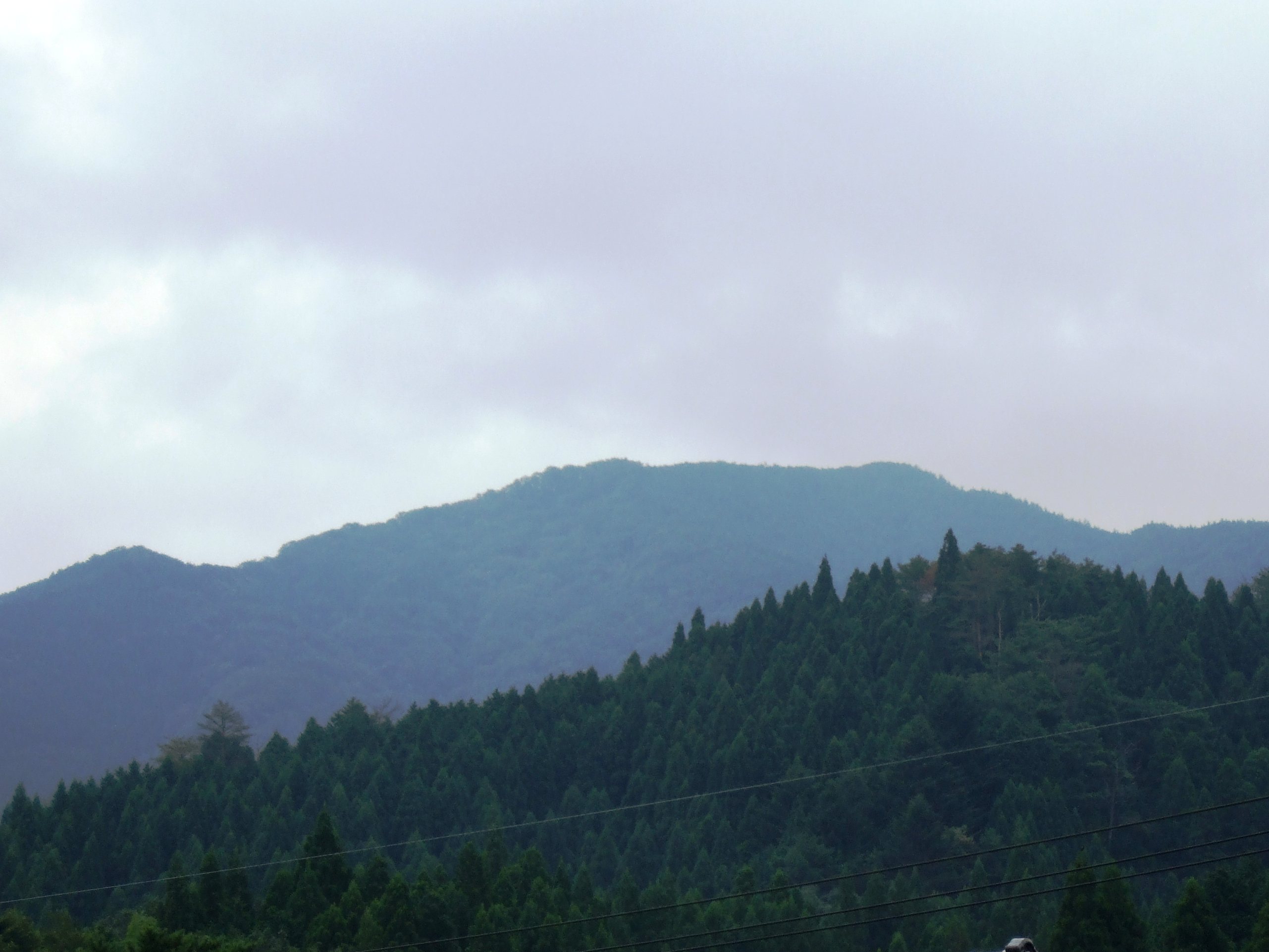
- Mount Hōbutsu seen from the WNW

Highest point
- Elevation: 1,005 m (3,297 ft)
- Coordinates: 35°13′48″N 133°28′12″E

Geography
- Location within Japan Location within Asia
- Location: Honshū, Japan
- Parent range: Chūgoku Mountains

Geology
- Mountain type: Monadoc

Mount Hōbutsu (宝仏山, Hōbutsu-san) is a Japanese mountain located on the border of Hino and Kōfu, Tottori. The area around the mountain was incorporated into as a part of Daisen-Oki National Park, in March 2002.

It has an elevation of 1,005 metres.

This mountain is one of Chūgoku 100 mountains and Tottori 50 mountains.

== Outline ==
Mount Hōbutsu is a typical monadic in Chūgoku Mountains.

This mountain had been an object of worship for the people in this region.

== Route ==
This mountain is a rare mountain which has easy access from a major railway station in San'in region.

- Neu Station of Hakubi Line.

== Gallery ==
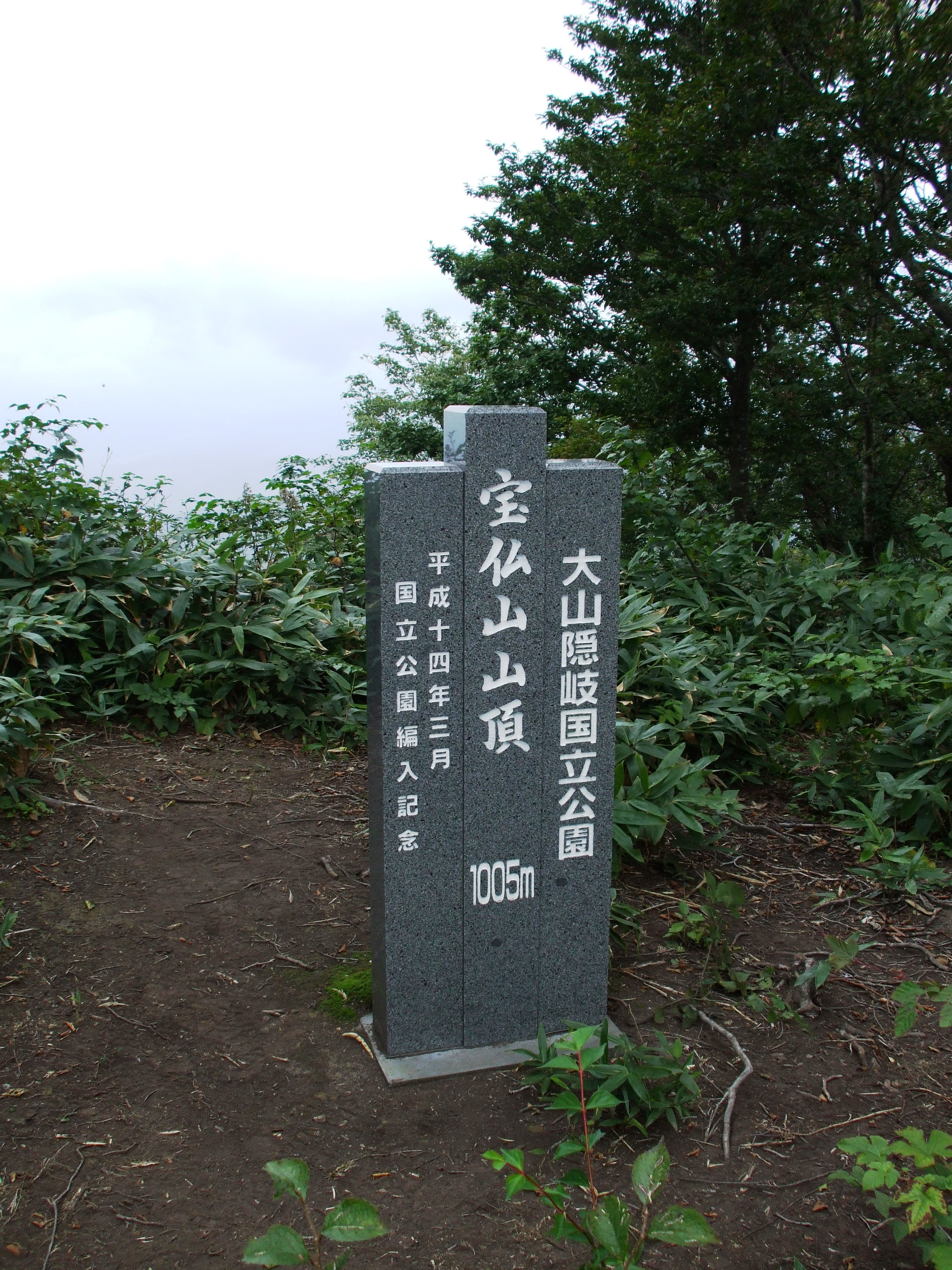
Top of Mount Hōbutsu

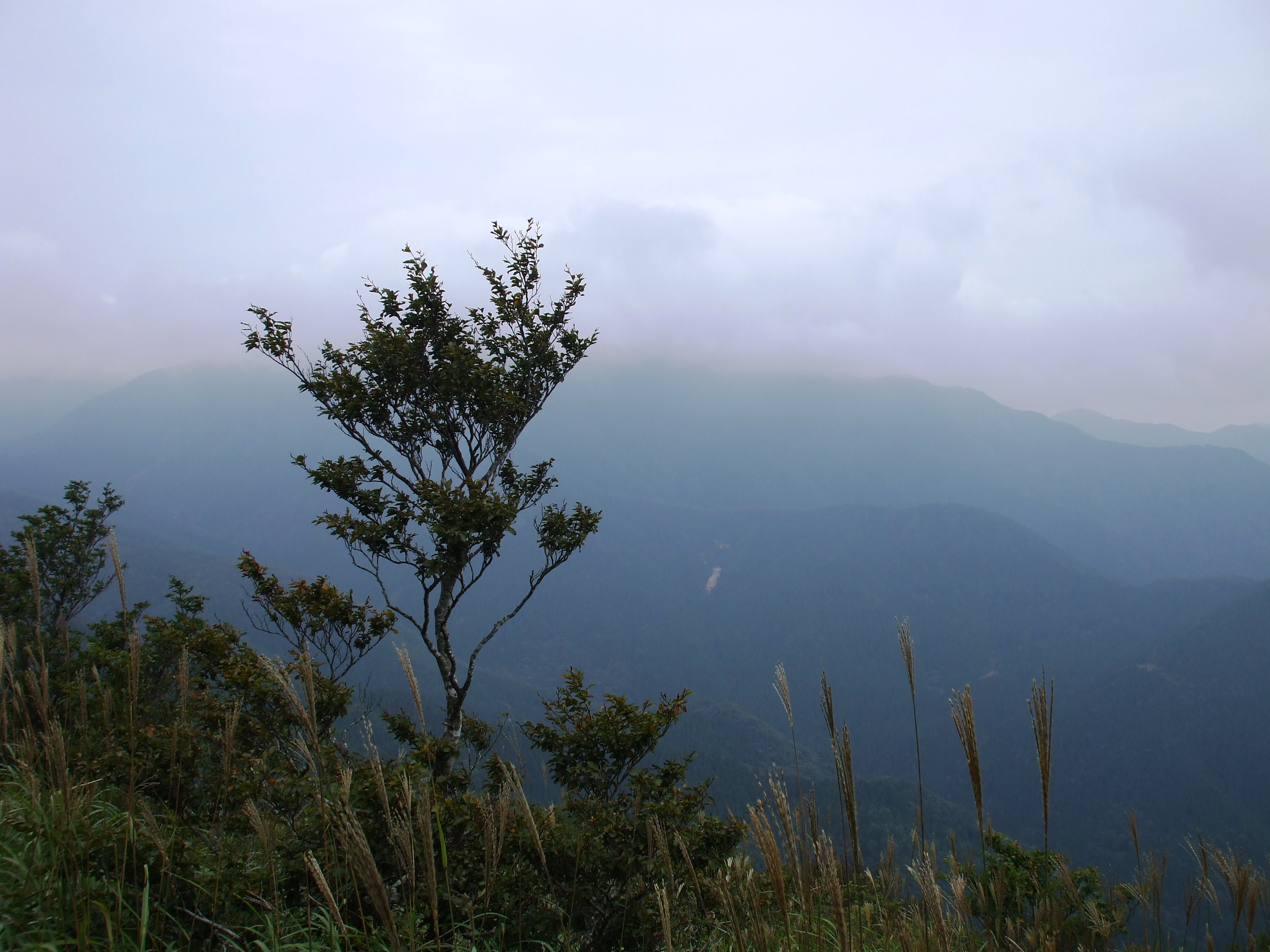
Looking east from Mount Hōbutsu

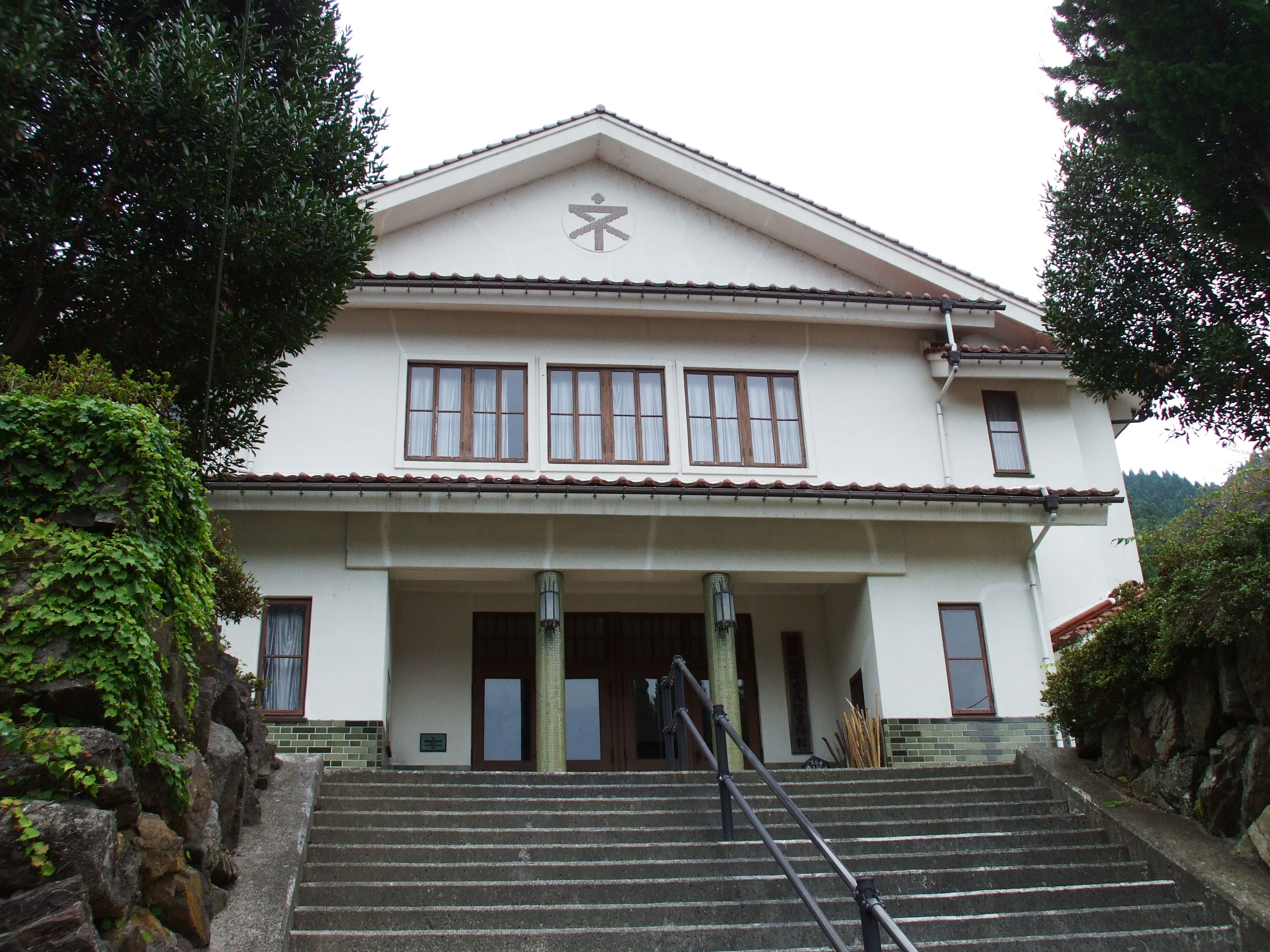
The entrance of climb route
