= Dōgojima =

One of the Oki islands in Japan

Dōgo Island
Native name: 島後 Dōgo
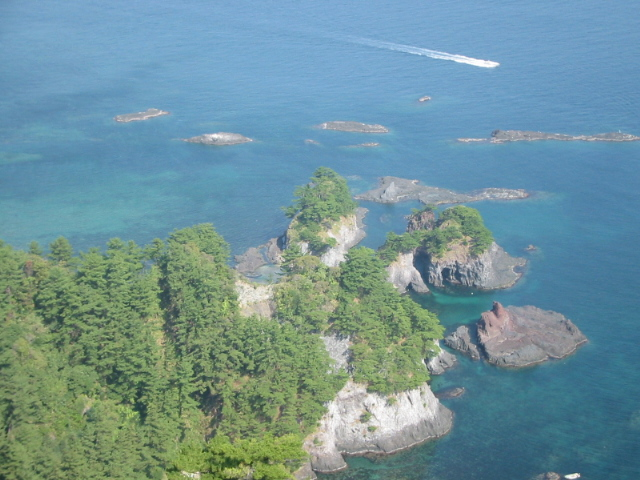
- Coastline of Dōgo Island

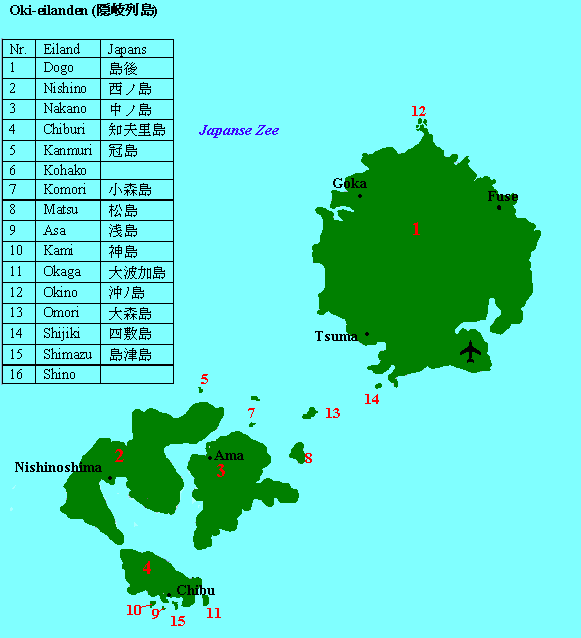

Geography
- Location: Sea of Japan
- Coordinates: 36°14′N 133°17′E
- Archipelago: Oki Islands
- Area: 241.58 km^{2} (93.27 sq mi)
- Coastline: 211 km (131.1 mi)
- Highest elevation: 607.7 m (1993.8 ft)
- Highest point: Mount Daimanji

Administration
- Japan
- Prefectures: Shimane Prefecture
- District: Oki District
- Town: Okinoshima

Demographics
- Population: 14,849 (2013)
- Ethnic groups: Japanese

Dōgo (島後) is one of the Oki Islands in the Sea of Japan.

The island, 241.58 km^{2} in area, has a population of approximately 14,849 people. The island is administered by the town of Okinoshima in Shimane Prefecture. Much of the island is within the borders of Daisen-Oki National Park.

== Geography ==
Dōgo Island is the largest of the Oki Islands. It is located approximately 80 kilometres (43 nmi) north of the Honshu coast. The island is of volcanic origin, and is roughly circular, with an approximate diameter of 20 kilometres (12 mi), with its highest point at the summit of Mount Daimanji at 608 metres (1,995 ft) above sea level.

The climate of Dōgo Island is classified as a humid subtropical climate (Köppen climate classification Cfa) with very warm summers and cool winters. Precipitation is abundant throughout the year.

== History ==
The Oki Islands have been inhabited since the Japanese Paleolithic era, and numerous artifacts from the Jōmon, Yayoi and Kofun periods have been found by archaeologists. Dōgo Island is mentioned in the Nara period chronicles Kojiki and Nihon Shoki, and Dōgo Island was the location of the capital of ancient Oki Province.

Dōgo Island was used as a place of exile from the Nara period, but is well known as the place of exile for ex-Emperor Go-Toba, who died on Nakanoshima in 1239, and for Emperor Go-Daigo, who was exiled to Nishinoshima from 1331 to 1333 The island became tenryo territory directly under the control of the Tokugawa shogunate in the Edo period.

After the Meiji Restoration, the Oki Islands became part of Tottori Prefecture in 1871, but were transferred to Shimane Prefecture in 1881.

In 1892, Lafcadio Hearn visited Dōgo Island, spending a month there, and writing about his experiences in Glimpses of Unfamiliar Japan. Dōgo Island was visited by the American naturalist Charles Henry Gilbert in 1906.

A lighthouse was erected on Cape Saigō in the southeast of the island in 1921. This lighthouse remained the only lighthouse in the Oki Islands until the 1950s.

On October 1, 2004, the town of Saigō merged with three neighboring villages to unify the island under the administration of the new town of Okinoshima.

== Transportation ==
Dōgo Island is connected by regular ferry service from Saigo Port to points on mainland Japan. Oki Airport connects the island with Osaka Itami Airport and Izumo by air.

== Economy ==
The economy of the island is based on agriculture and commercial fishing. Seasonal tourism also plays a role in the local economy.

== See also ==
- List of islands in Japan
