= Nishinoshima, Shimane =

Nishinoshima 西ノ島町
- Town
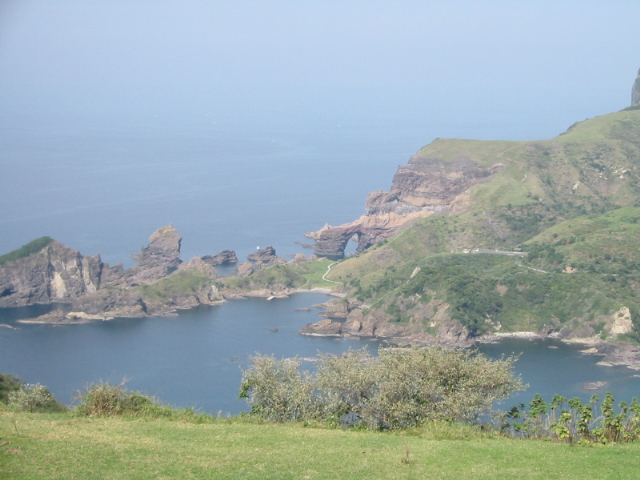
- Kuniga shore

- Flag Seal

- Location of Nishinoshima in Shimane Prefecture

- Coordinates: 36°5′N 133°0′E
- Country: Japan
- Region: Chūgoku; San'in
- Prefecture: Shimane Prefecture
- District: Oki

Area
  - Total: 55.98 km^{2} (21.61 sq mi)

Population (2025)
  - Total: 2,495
  - Density: 44.57/km^{2} (115.4/sq mi)
- Time zone: UTC+9 (Japan Standard Time)
- Phone number: 08514-6-0101
- Address: 534 Urago, Nishinoshima-cho, Oki-gun, Shimane-ken 684-0211
- Website: www.town.nishinoshima.shimane.jp

Nishinoshima (西ノ島町, Nishinoshima-chō) is a town located on the island of Nishinoshima, in Oki District, Shimane Prefecture, Japan. As of 2025, the town had a population of 2,495 and a population density of about 44 persons per km^{2}. The total area was 55.98 km^{2} (22 mi^{2}).

== Geography ==
Nishinoshima occupies all of the island of Nishinoshima, in the Oki Islands archipelago in the Sea of Japan, along with a number of offshore uninhabited islands and rocks. Much of the town is within the borders of Daisen-Oki National Park.

== Climate ==
Nishinoshima has a humid subtropical climate (Köppen climate classification Cfa) with very warm summers and cool winters. Precipitation is abundant throughout the year.

== History ==
Nishinoshima was part of ancient Oki Province, and is the location of a number of Shinto shrines dating to the early Heian period. Nishinoshima, along with Ama and Okinoshima Town claim to be the location of the home-in-exile for ex-emperors Go-Toba and Go-Daigo.

After the Meiji restoration, the Oki Islands became part of Tottori Prefecture in 1871, but were transferred to Shimane Prefecture in 1881. The island was divided between Urago Village in the west and Kuroki Village in the east in 1904. The two municipalities were divided by a canal in 1915, which cut the island into two parts. Urago became a town in November 1946 and merged with Kuroki in 1957 to form Nishinoshima Town. The two portions of the island were joined by a bridge in 2005.

== Culture ==
Nishinoshima's traditional performance art Shūhairā was designated as an Important Intangible Folk Cultural Property by the Japanese government.

The town mascot is a squid. She is called “Katsu-ika-Kacchan” or “Kacchan” for short.

== Economy ==
The town economy is primarily based on agriculture and commercial fishing.

== Transportation ==
=== Highway ===
- National Route 485

== Gallery ==
The town mascot

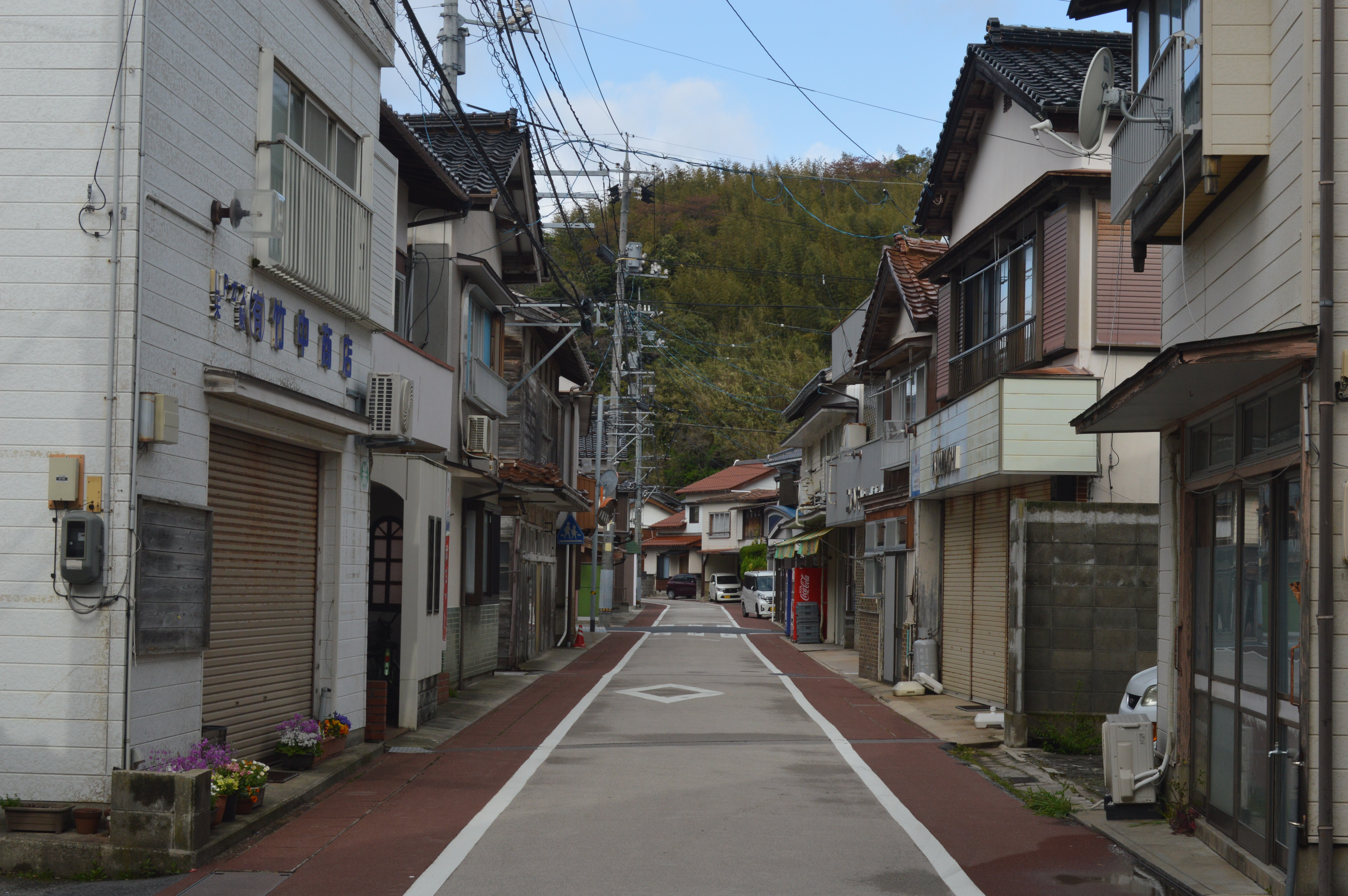
Nishinoshima town

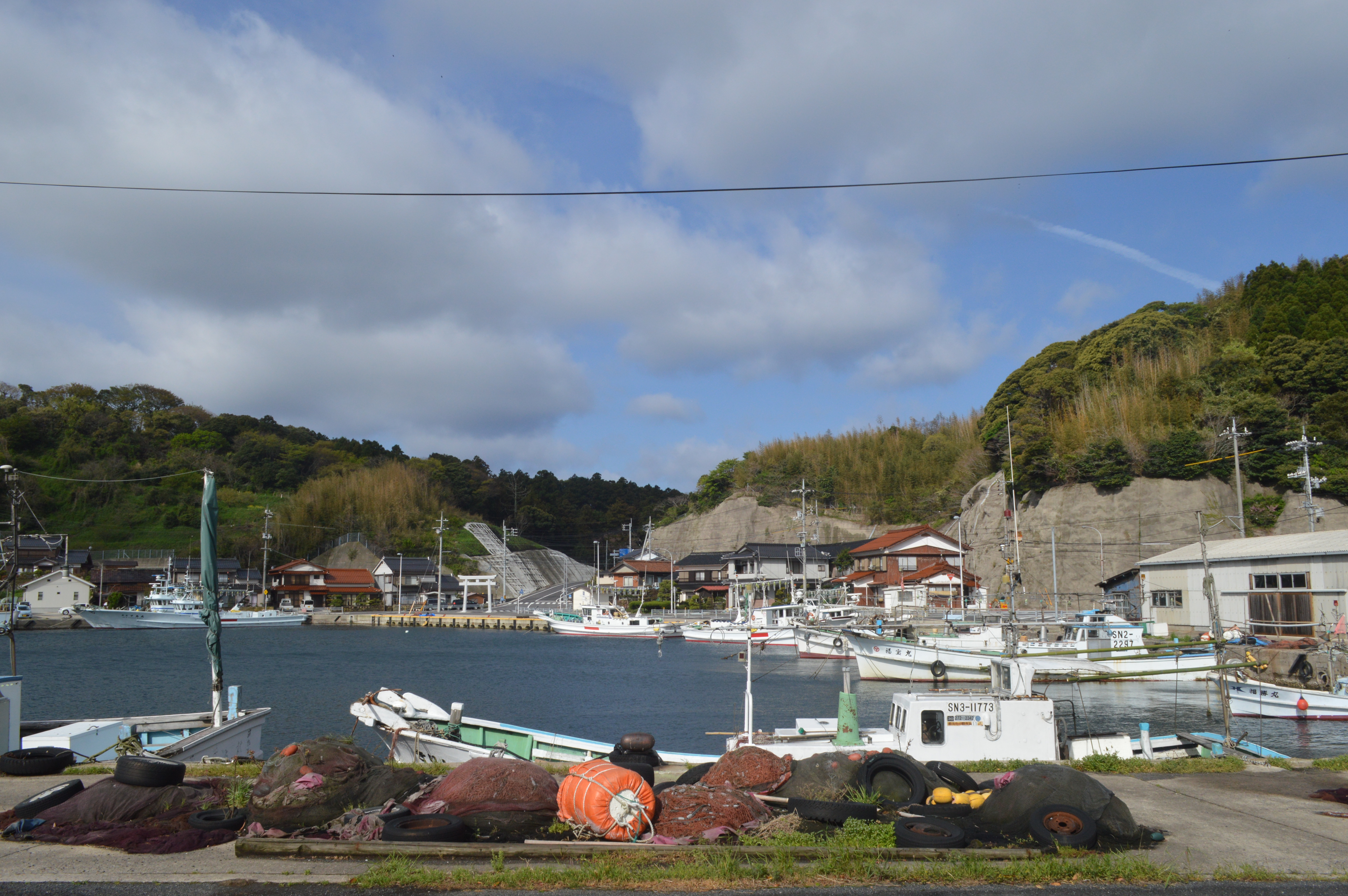
Urago Port

Yurahime shrine

View onto Kuniga Coast

Tsūtenkyō Arch
