= Oki Islands =

Archipelago in the Sea of Japan

Oki
Native name: 隠岐諸島
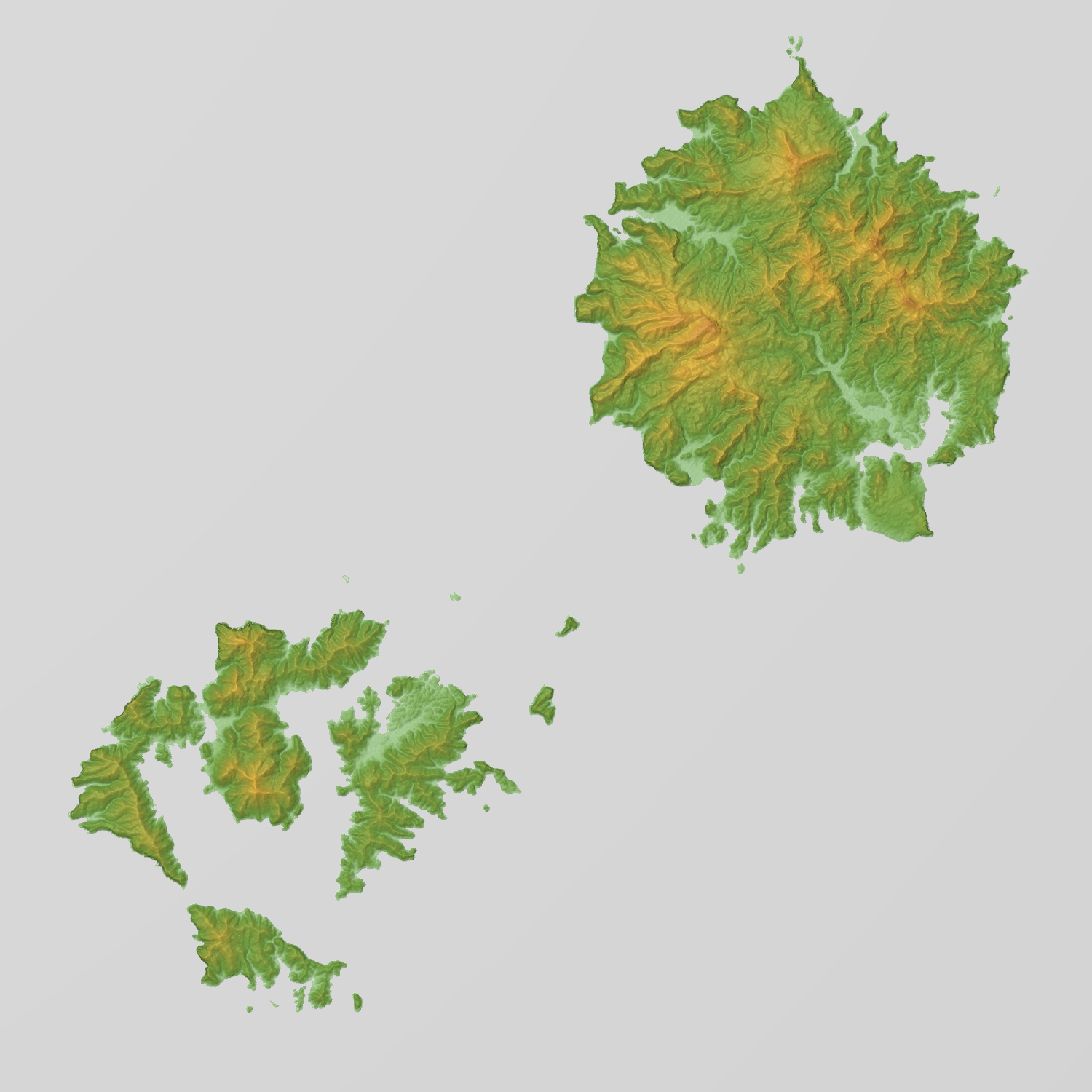

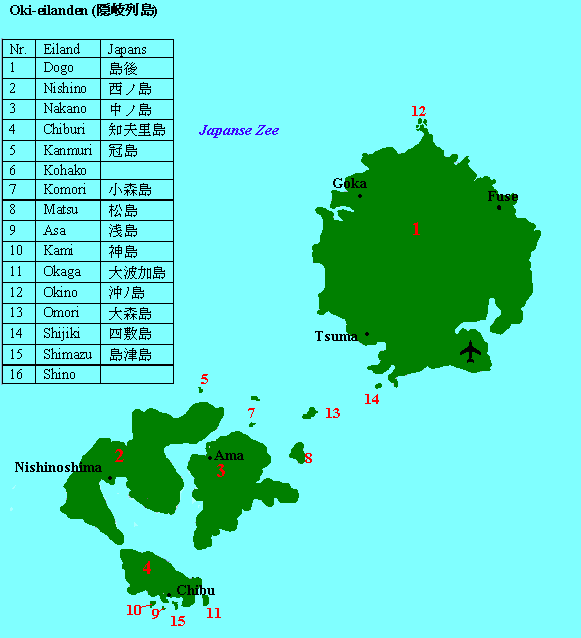
- Map of the Oki Islands

Geography
- Coordinates: 36°10′16.1″N 133°8′40.8″E
- Adjacent to: Sea of Japan
- Total islands: 4 main, 16 named, 180+ total
- Area: 346.1 km^{2} (133.6 sq mi)

Administration
- Japan
- Prefectures: Shimane
- District: Oki District

Demographics
- Population: 24,500 (2010)
- Pop. density: 70.7/km^{2} (183.1/sq mi)
- Ethnic groups: Japanese

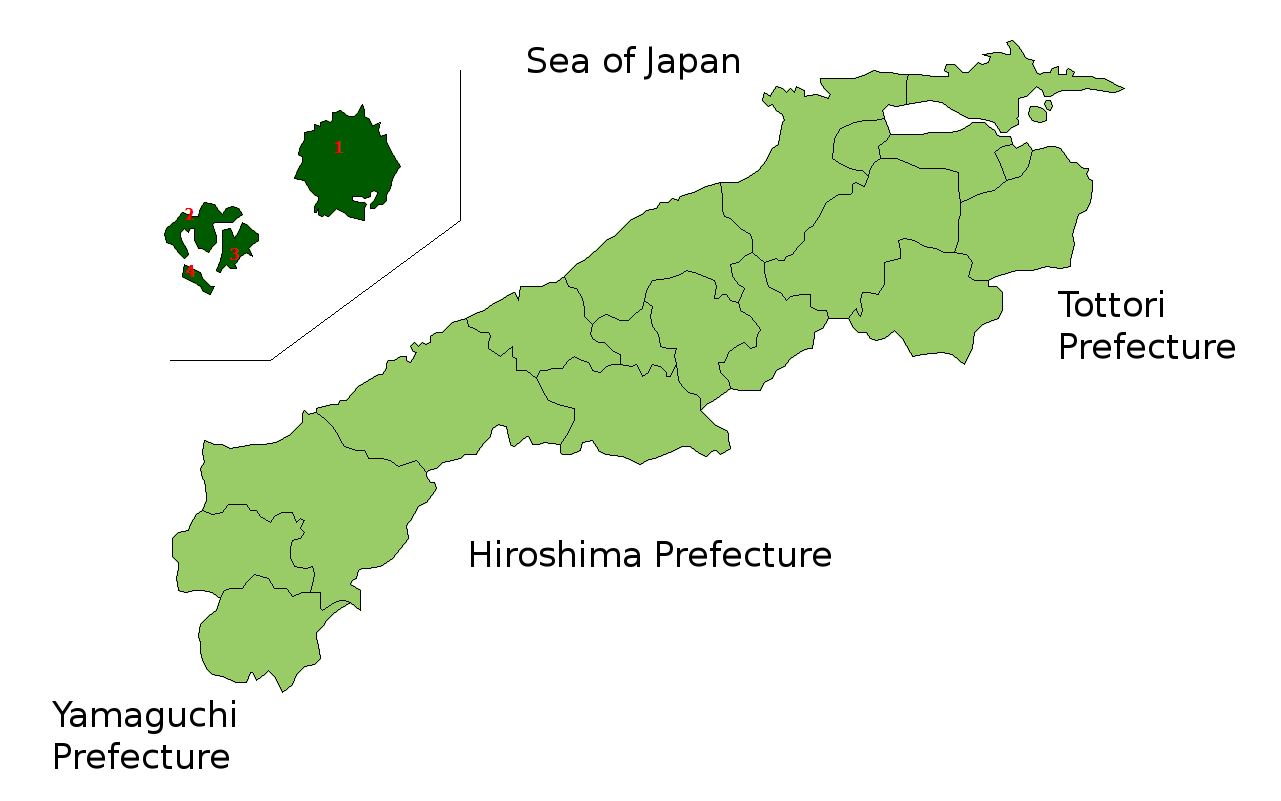

The Oki Islands (隠岐諸島, Oki-shotō; or 隠岐の島 Oki-no-shima, 隠岐群島 Oki-guntō) is an archipelago in the Sea of Japan, the islands of which are administratively part of Oki District, Shimane Prefecture, Japan. The islands have a total area of 346.1 square kilometres (133.6 sq mi). Only four of the around 180 islands are permanently inhabited. Much of the archipelago is within the borders of Daisen-Oki National Park. Due to their geological heritage, the Oki Islands were designated a UNESCO Global Geopark in September 2013.

== Geology ==
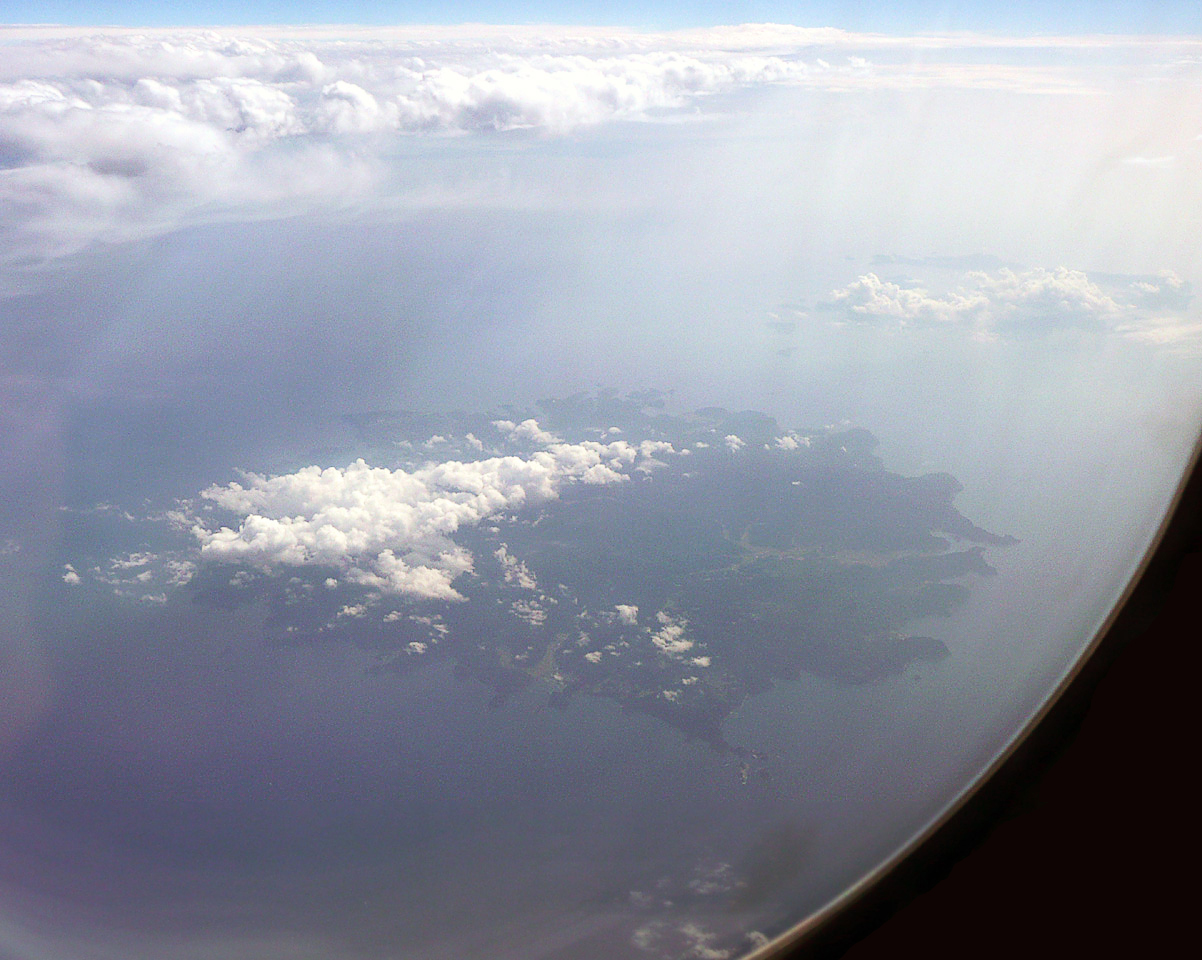
Dogo island (front) and Dozen islands (rear)

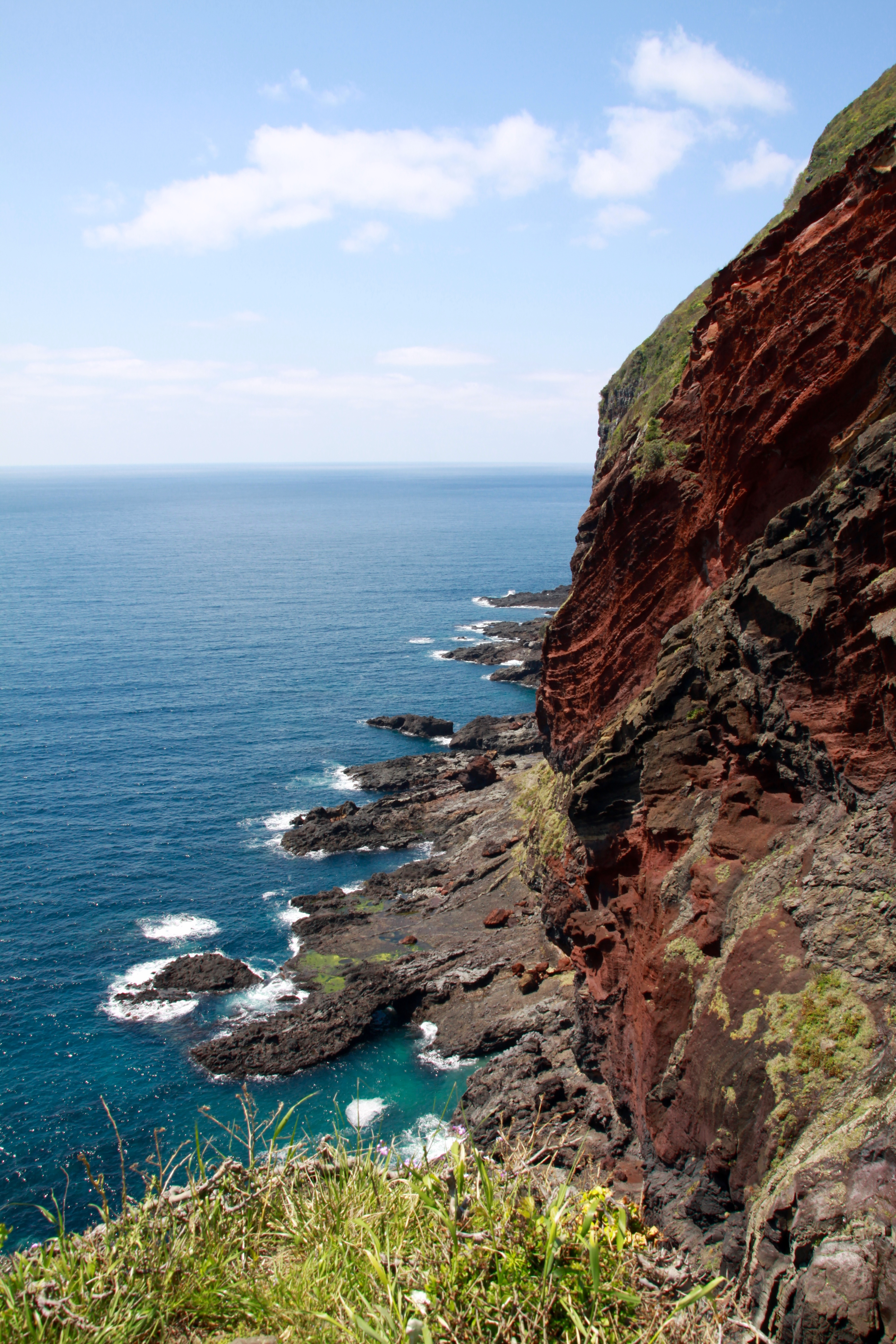
Sekiheki volcanic cliff, Chiburijima.

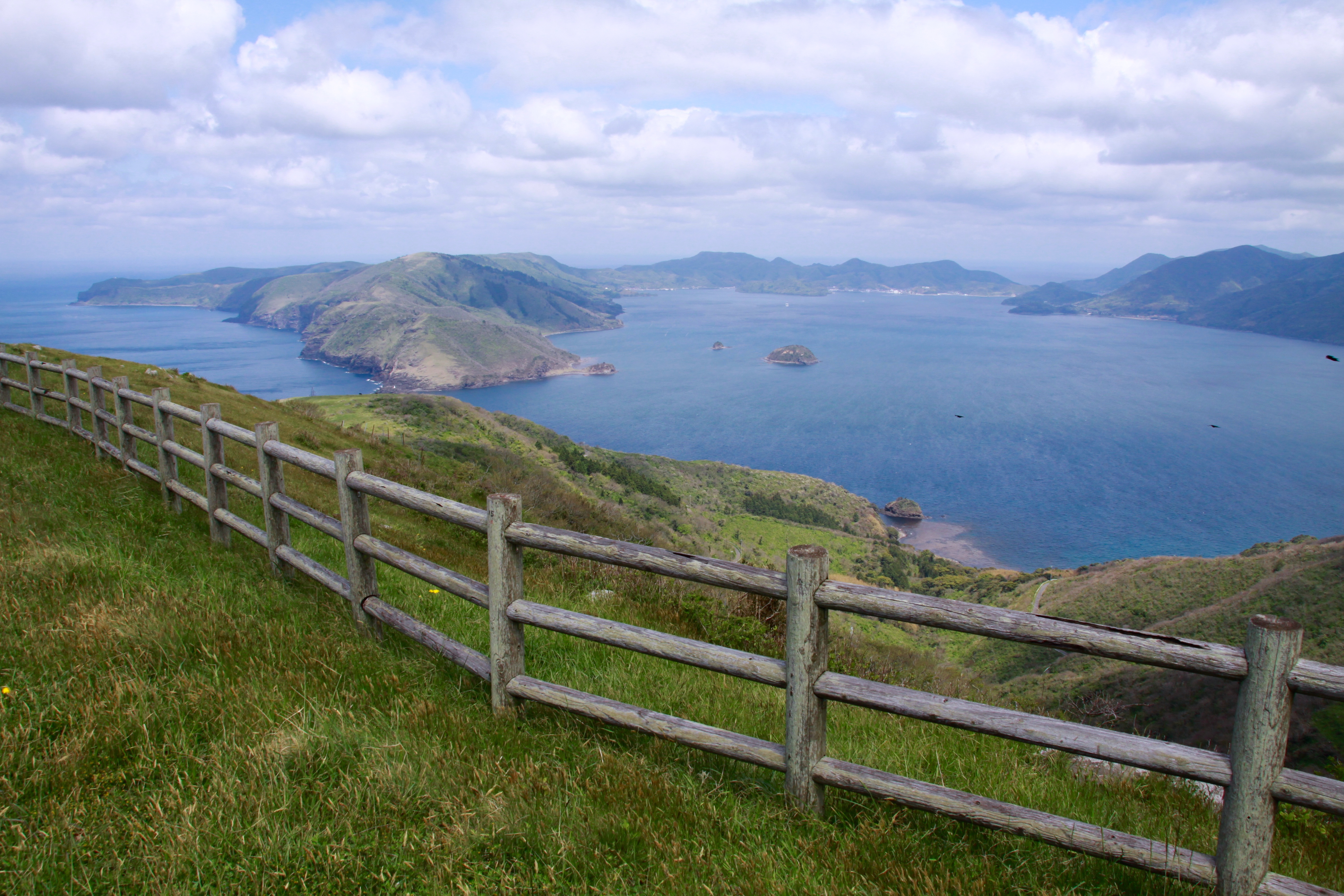
Dozen Caldera seen from Mt. Akahage, Chiburijima

The Oki Islands are volcanic in origin, and are the exposed eroded summits of two massive stratovolcanoes dating approximately 5 million years ago to the Tertiary and Quaternary periods.

Dōgo to the east is the largest island in area, and has the highest elevation, Mount Daimanji, at 608 metres (1,995 ft) above sea level. The Dōzen group of islands to the west are all portions of a single ancient volcanic caldera which collapsed, leaving three large islands (Nishinoshima, Nakanoshima and Chiburijima) and numerous smaller islands and rocks in a ring formation surrounding a central lagoon. The archipelago is approximately 40-80 kilometres (43 nmi) north of the Honshu coast at its closest point. For administrative purposes, the Japanese government officially considers the disputed islet of Liancourt Rocks (Dokdo or Takeshima) to be a part of the town of Okinoshima on Dōgo.

== Climate ==
Chibu

Climate chart (precipitation, max. and min. temperature)
J	F	M	A	M	J	J	A	S	O	N	D
- █ Average max. and min. temperatures in °C
- █ Precipitation totals in mm
Imperial conversion
J	F	M	A	M	J	J	A	S	O	N	D
- █ Average max. and min. temperatures in °F
- █ Precipitation totals in inches

- Summers (June–August) average around 30 degrees Celsius plus humidity. There usually is a strong sea breeze. The sea waves during the summer rarely exceed 2 meters.
- Autumn (September–November) is temperate. It begins to rain more often and the waves begin to grow.
- Winters (December to the end of February) are relatively mild. Temperatures rarely drop below freezing. Also, due to the warming influence of the sea, Oki does not get much snow and any snow does not lie for long because the ground is not cold enough. The ferry is more likely to be canceled due to high waves, but it is still possible to leave the island. The Rainbow fast ferry stops operating in December.
- Spring (March–May) is generally regarded as the best season. There are many opportunities for viewing cherry blossoms on Oki during the spring. The Rainbow fast ferry starts running mid-February.

== Important Bird Area ==
The islands have been recognised as an Important Bird Area (IBA) by BirdLife International because they support populations of Japanese wood pigeons.

== History ==
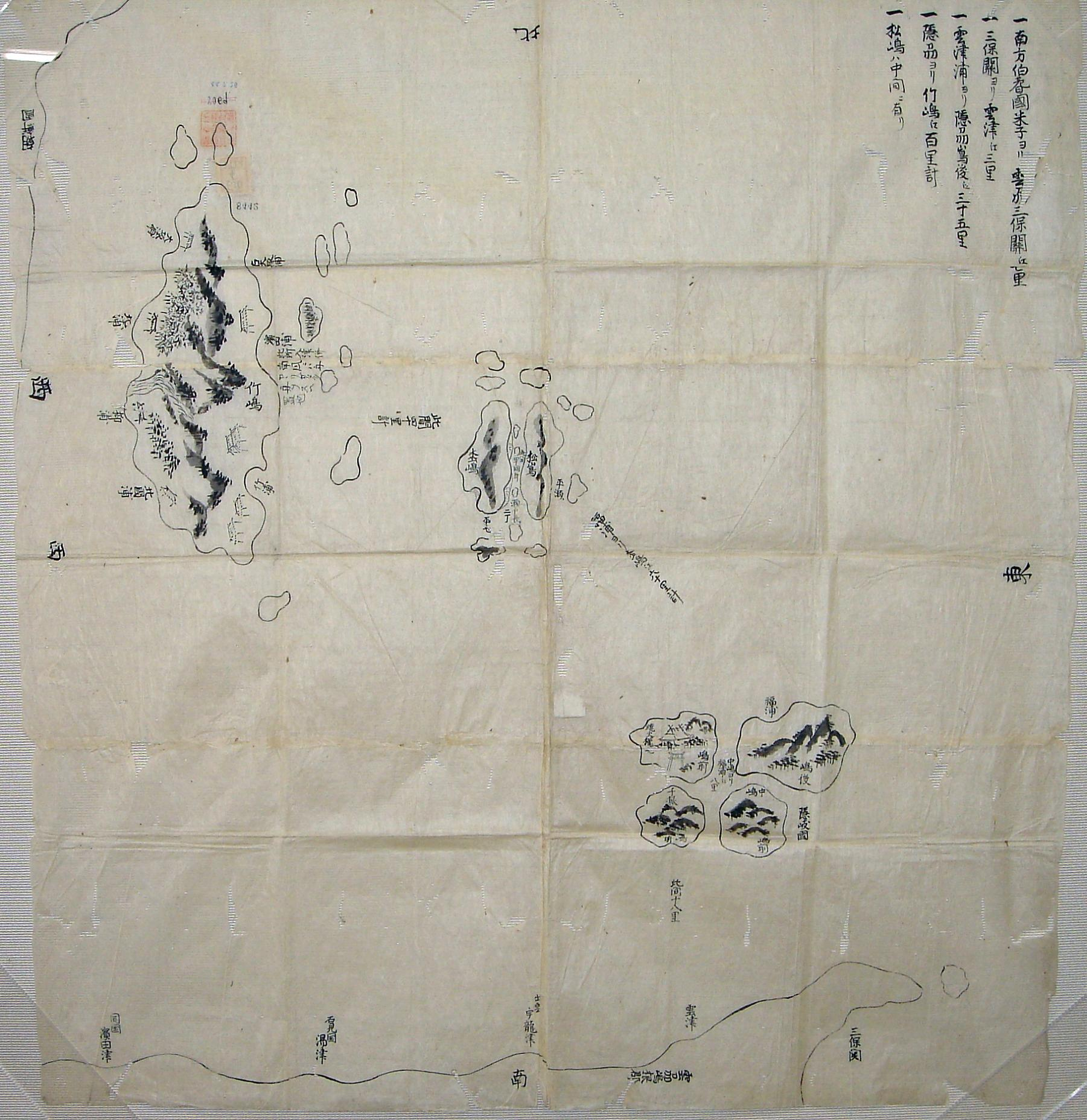
A Japanese map dating from 1724, with the Oki Islands at the lower right, Liancourt Rocks in the center, and Ulleungdo on the left

The Oki Islands have been inhabited since the Japanese Paleolithic era, and numerous artifacts from the Jōmon, Yayoi and Kofun periods have been found by archaeologists, indicating continuous human occupation and activity. The islands were organized as Oki Province under the Ritsuryō reforms in the latter half of the seventh century, and the name “Oki-no-kuni” appears on wooden markers found in the imperial capital of Nara. The islands are mentioned in the Nara period chronicles Kojiki and Nihon Shoki, and Dōgo Island was the location of the capital of ancient Oki Province. During the late Heian period, due to its remoteness, Oki Province came to be known as a place for political exile. In 1221, Emperor Go-Toba was sent to Oki, and died in exile on the islands; In 1332, Emperor Go-Daigo was also sent in exile to Oki, but later managed to escape and regain control of the country.

From the Kamakura period, Oki Province was governed primarily by the shugo of Izumo Province. In the Muromachi period, it was ruled successively by the Sasaki clan, the Yamana clan and the Kyōgoku clan. In the Sengoku period the Amago clan held this province. After the Amago fell and the Tokugawa shogunate was established, Oki Province was declared a tenryō dominion under the direct control of the shōgun. The daimyō of Matsue Domain, belonging to the Matsudaira clan, was appointed as governor.

The entire province had an assessed revenue of only 18,000 koku, although its actual revenues were closer to only 12,000 koku. The province was a frequent port of call for the Kitamaebune coastal trading ships during the Edo period.

Following the Meiji Restoration, Oki Province became "Oki Prefecture" from February to June 1869. It was then attached to Tottori Prefecture until 1876, when it was transferred to Shimane Prefecture.

In 1892, Lafcadio Hearn visited the islands, spending a month there, and writing about his experiences in Glimpses of Unfamiliar Japan. Oki was visited by the American naturalist Charles Henry Gilbert in 1906.

== Administration ==
The population is approximately 20,000 inhabitants spread over the four municipalities of:

- Ama-chō (Ama-town), includes all of Nakanoshima and the nearby uninhabited islets of Omorijima and Matsushima, with a total population of about 2,300.
- Chibu-mura (Chibu-village), includes all of Chiburijima and the nearby uninhabited islets of Ohatajima, Shimazushima, Asajima and Kamjima, with a total population of about 640.
- Nishinoshima-chō (Nishinoshima-town), includes all of Nishinoshima and nearby uninhabited islets of Hoshikamijima, Futamatajima and Okazuroshima, population about 2,800.
- Okinoshima-chō (Okinoshima-town), includes all of Dōgo and the uninhabited islets of Okinashima, Obanashima, Tsunameshima, Shijikijima and Ombeshima, with a total population of approximately 14,300.

== Transportation ==
Oki Airport (airport code "OKI") lies on the southeastern part of Dōgo and provides air service to Osaka Itami Airport (ITM) and Izumo Airport (IZO).

The Oki islands can be reached by ferries from harbours like Sakaiminato (Tottori Prefecture) and Shichirui (Shimane Prefecture) on the mainland. There are also frequent ferries operating between the Dōzen islands throughout the year.

== Main islands ==
Photo	Name	Kanji	Area [km^{2}]	Population	highest point [m]	Peak	Coordinates
	Dōgo	島後	241.58	14,300	608	Mount Daimanji	36°14′N 133°17′E
	Nakanoshima	中ノ島	32.21	2,300	164		36°5′N 133°06′E
	Nishinoshima	西ノ島	55.97	2,800	452	Takuhiyama	36°6′N 133°00′E
	Chiburijima	知夫里島	13.7	640	325		36°1′N 133°02′E
