= Mount Kenashi =

Mount Kenashi (毛無山, Kenashi-yama, lit. "bald mountain") is the name for numerous mountains in Japan.

- Mount Kenashi (Otaru), a 548 m (1,798 ft) mountain in Otaru, Hokkaidō
- Mount Kenashi (Yoichi), a 650 m (2,133 ft) mountain on the border of Otaru and Yoichi, Hokkaidō
- Mount Kenashi (Setana), a 816 m (2,677 ft) mountain in Setana, Hokkaidō
- Mount Kenashi (Hakodate), a 631 m (2,070 ft) mountain in Hakodate, Hokkaidō
- Mount Kenashi (Akita), a mountain in Akita Prefecture
- Mount Kenashi (Niigata), a mountain in Niigata Prefecture
- Mount Kenashi (Nagano), a mountain in Iiyama, Nagano Prefecture
- Mount Kenashi (Yamanashi), a 1,500 m (4,921 ft) mountain in Yamanashi Prefecture
- Mount Kenashi (Yamanashi, Shizuoka), a 1,946 m (6,385 ft) mountain in Yamanashi and Shizuoka prefectures
- Mount Kenashi (Tottori), a 570.5 m (1,872 ft) mountain in Tottori Prefecture
- Mount Kenashi (Okayama, Tottori), a mountain in Okayama and Tottori prefectures
- Mount Kenashi (Hiroshima), a mountain in Hiroshima Prefecture
- Mount Kenashi (Shimane), a 1,062 m (3,484 ft) mountain in Shimane Prefecture
