= Nakanoshima Station =

Nakanoshima Station is the name of three train stations in Japan:

- Nakanoshima Station (Hokkaidō), located on the Sapporo Municipal Subway Namboku Line in Toyohira-ku, Sapporo, Hokkaidō
- Nakanoshima Station (Kanagawa), located on the JR East Nambu Line in Tama-ku, Kawasaki, Kanagawa Prefecture
- Nakanoshima Station (Osaka), located on the Keihan Electric Railway Nakanoshima Line in Kita-ku, Osaka, Osaka Prefecture
