= Nakanoshima (Shimane) =

Dōzen Island in the Oki archipelago in the Sea of Japan

Native name: 中ノ島, Nakanoshima Nickname: Ama-tō
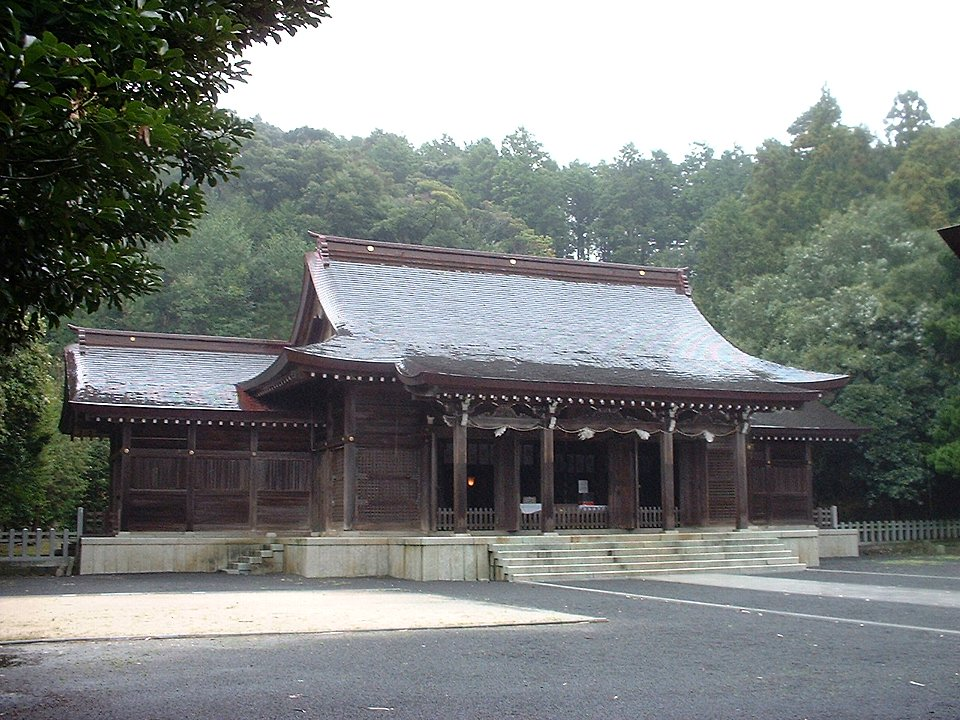
- Oji Jinja on Nakanoshima

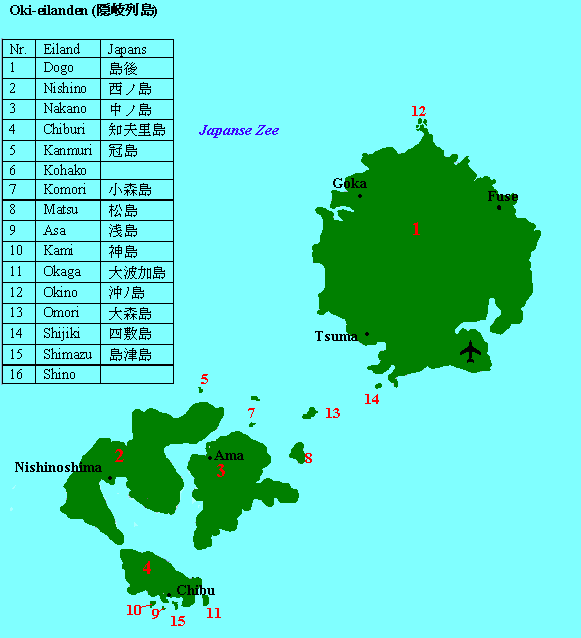

Geography
- Location: Sea of Japan
- Coordinates: 36°5′N 133°06′E
- Archipelago: Oki Islands
- Area: 32.21 km^{2} (12.44 sq mi)
- Coastline: 89.1 km (55.36 mi)
- Highest elevation: 164 m (538 ft)

Administration
- Japan
- Prefectures: Shimane Prefecture
- District: Oki District
- Town: Ama

Demographics
- Population: 2,400 (2013)
- Ethnic groups: Japanese

Nakanoshima (中ノ島, also Naka-no-shima) is one of the Dōzen Islands in the Oki archipelago in the Sea of Japan. It is also known as Ama-tō (海士島).

The island, 32.21 km^{2} in area, has a population of approximately 2,400 persons. The island is administered by the town of Ama in Shimane Prefecture. Much of the island is within the borders of Daisen-Oki National Park.

== Geography ==
Nakanoshima is the third largest of the Oki Islands. It is located approximately three hours by ferry north of Honshu coast. The island is of volcanic origin, with deeply indented coastline of 89.1 kilometres (55.4 mi), and with its highest point at 164 metres (538 ft) above sea level.

The climate of Nakanshima is classified as a humid subtropical climate (Köppen climate classification Cfa) with very warm summers and cool winters. Precipitation is abundant throughout the year.

== History ==
The Oki Islands have been inhabited since the Japanese Paleolithic era, and numerous artifacts from the Jōmon, Yayoi and Kofun periods have been found by archaeologists.

Nakanoshima was used as a place of exile from the Nara period, but is well known as the place of exile for ex-Emperor Go-Toba, who died on the island in 1239. Oki Jinja was erected on the island in 1939 in commemoration of this date. The island became part of the holdings under the control of Matsue Domain under the Tokugawa shogunate in the Edo period.

After the Meiji restoration, the Oki Islands became part of Tottori Prefecture in 1871, but were transferred to Shimane Prefecture in 1881.

The island became part of Ama Village in 1904, and reached a peak population in 1950 with 6,986 inhabitants. It was raised to town status in 1969.

== Transportation ==
Nakanoshima is connected by regular ferry service from Saigo Port on Dōgojima, as well as by direct ferry service to points on mainland Japan.

== Economy ==
The economy of the island is based on agriculture and commercial fishing. Seasonal tourism also plays a role in the local economy.
