= Oki District, Shimane =

District in Shimane prefecture, Japan

Coordinates: 36°13′30″N 133°14′42″E

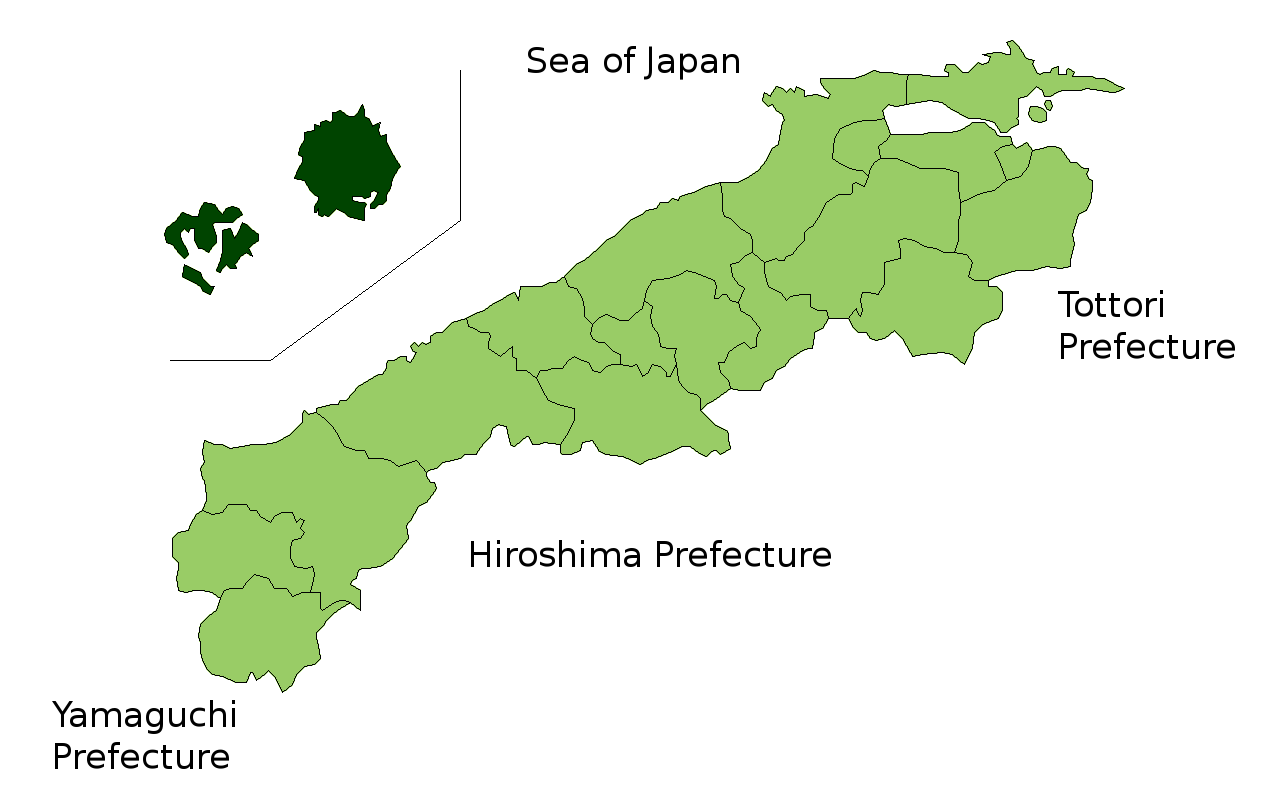
Location of Oki District in Shimane Prefecture

Oki (隠岐郡, Oki-gun) is a district located in Shimane Prefecture, Japan.

== Population ==
As of 2003, the district has an estimated population of 24,500 and a density of 70.79 people per km^{2}. The total area is 346.10 km^{2}.

== Geography ==
The Oki District encompasses the Oki Islands, historically called Oki Province.

== Towns and villages ==
- Ama (Nakanoshima Island)
- Chibu (Chiburijima Island)
- Nishinoshima (Nishinoshima Island)
- Okinoshima (Dōgo Island) - formed from the merger of Fuse, Goka, Saigō and Tsuma on October 1, 2004
