= Daisen-Oki National Park =

National Park in Chūgoku, Japan

- 大山隠岐国立公園
- IUCN category II (national park)
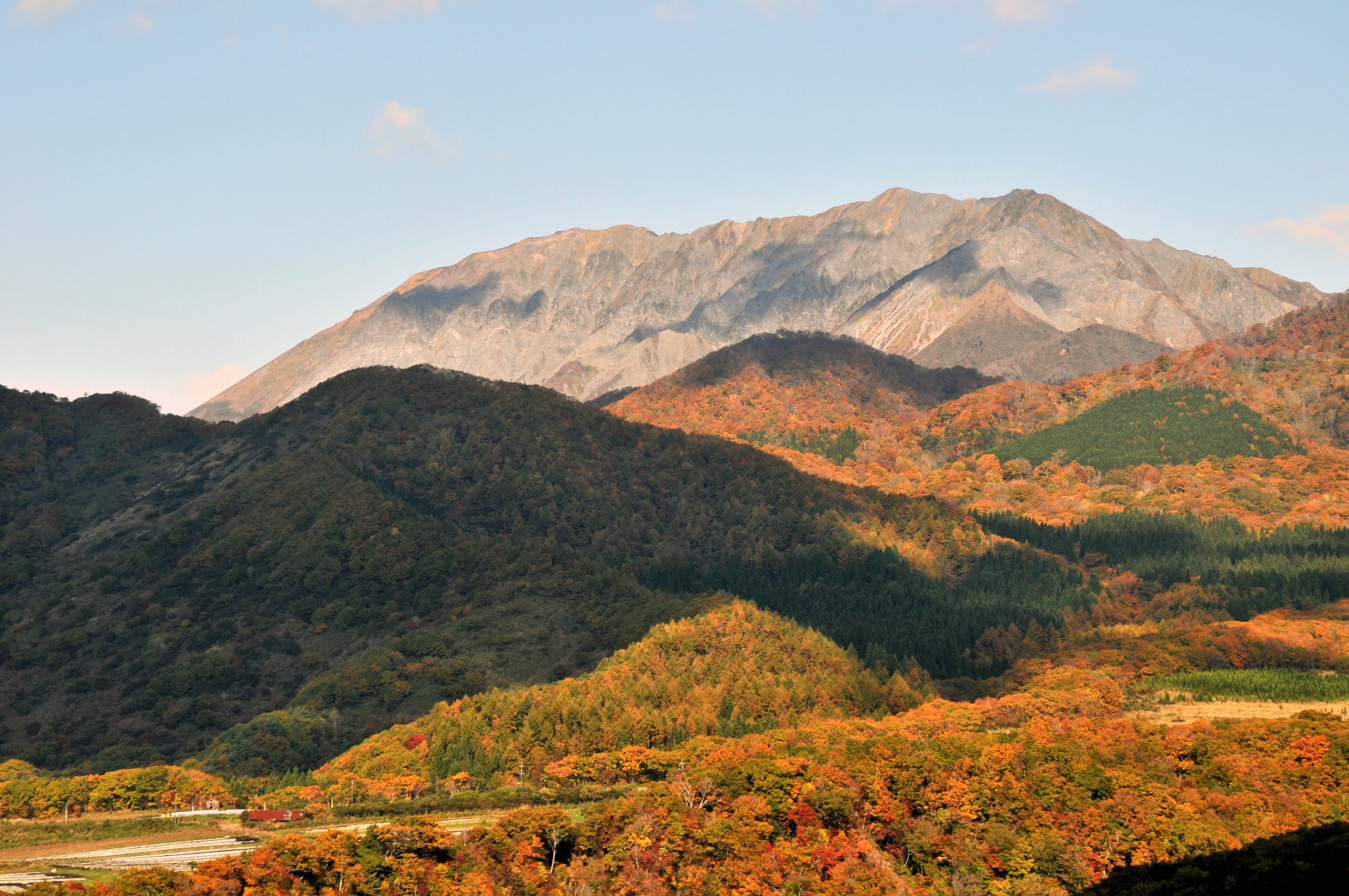
- Mount Daisen, the highest peak in Daisen-Oki National Park

- Location within Japan
- Location: Honshū, Japan
- Coordinates: 35°27′N 133°46′E
- Area: 319.27 km^{2} (123.27 sq mi)
- Established: February 1, 1936

Daisen-Oki National Park (大山隠岐国立公園, Daisen Oki Kokuritsu Kōen) is a national park in the Chūgoku region, Honshū, Japan, and spans the prefectures of Okayama, Shimane, and Tottori. Mount Daisen is the focus of the park, which also includes the volcanic mountains and plains of Hiruzen, Mount Kenashi, Mount Sanbe, and Mount Hōbutsu. The Izumo Plain region of the park is home to the oldest Shinto shrine in Japan, the Izumo-taisha. The Oki Islands are also an important component of the park. The park was established in 1936 as Daisen National Park (大山国立公園, Daisen Oki Kokuritsu Kōen), but was expanded and renamed in 1961 to include the Oki Islands and Shimane Prefecture areas.

== See also ==
- List of national parks of Japan
