= Manitou (disambiguation) =

Manitou is a general term for spirit beings among many Algonquian Native American groups.

Manitou or Manitu may also refer to:

== Business ==
- Manitou, a subsidiary of Hayes Bicycle that designs and manufactures suspension and dropper seat posts for mountain bikes
- Manitou, a subsidiary of Bombardier Recreational Products (BRP) that designs and manufactures luxury, performance pontoon boats
- Manitou Group, a France-based manufacturer of fork lifts and other heavy equipment

== Communities ==
=== Canada ===
- Manitou, Manitoba, an unincorporated urban community
- Manitou Beach, a resort village in Saskatchewan

=== United States ===
Listed alphabetically by state

- Manitou Springs, Colorado, a home rule municipality
- Manitou, Kentucky, an unincorporated community
- Manitou County, Michigan, existed from 1855 to 1895
- Manitou, New York, a place in Putnam County, New York
- Manitou, North Dakota, an unincorporated community
- Manitou, Oklahoma, a town

== Geography ==
- Manitou Island (disambiguation), several places
- Manitou Lake (disambiguation), several places
- Manitou Park (disambiguation), several places
- Manitou Passage, a navigable Lake Michigan waterway
- Manitou River (disambiguation), several places

== Media ==
- "Manitou", a song by the heavy metal band Venom from the album At War with Satan
- The Manitou, a 1978 American horror movie
- Manitou (DC Comics), Native American superheroes published in American comic books.

== Watercraft ==
- SY Manitou, a performance cruising yacht launched in 1937; served as the presidential yacht of John F. Kennedy
- USS Manitou, onetime name of USS Fort Hindman, a steamer acquired by the Union Navy during the American Civil War

== Other uses ==
- Manitou, alternate name of Léon Ashkenazi, French Rabbi and thinker of the 20th century
- Manitou station, a limited-service stop on the Metro-North Railroad's Hudson Line in Putnam County, New York
- Manitou–Morden, a former provincial electoral division in Manitoba, Canada

== See also ==
- Gitche Manitou, the Great Spirit among many Algonquian groups
- Manito (disambiguation)
- Manitoulin (disambiguation)
