= SS Walter L. Frost =

Great Lakes package freighter lost in 1903

Coordinates: 44°59′45.72″N 86°8′33.12″W

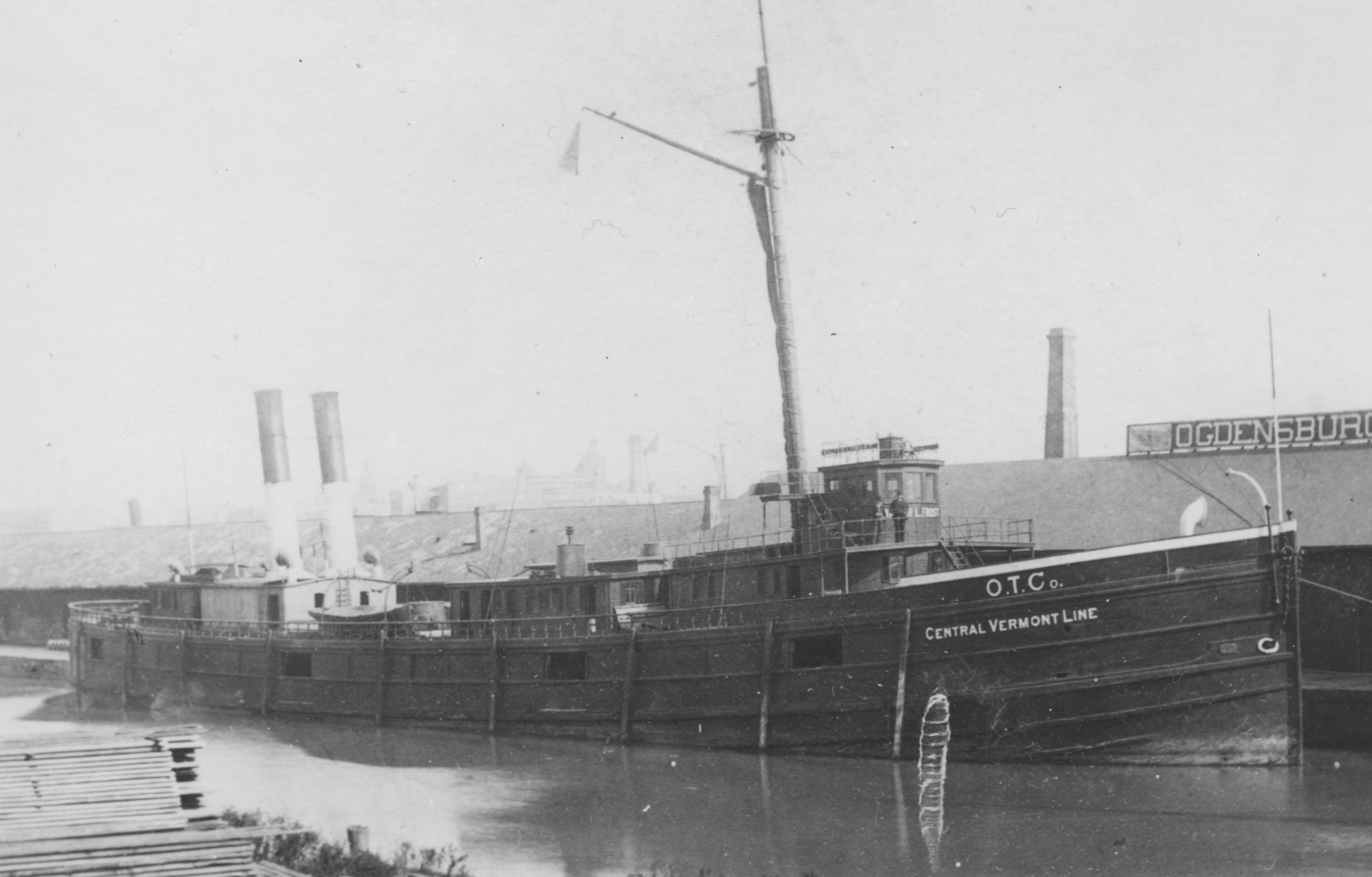

History

United States
- Name: Walter L. Frost
- Operator: Rutland Transit Company
- Builder: Detroit Dry Dock Company, Detroit, Michigan
- Cost: $120,000 ($3.42 million in 2024) (Note: Johnston, Louis & Williamson, Samuel H. (2023). "What Was the U.S. GDP Then?". MeasuringWorth. United States Gross Domestic Product deflator figures follow the MeasuringWorth series.)
- Yard number: 62
- Launched: June 9, 1883
- Out of service: November 4, 1903
- Identification: US official number 80973
- Fate: Ran aground on South Manitou Island.

General characteristics
- Class & type: Package freighter
- Tonnage: 1,322 GRT; 1,203 NRT
- Length: 250 feet (76 m) o/a; 235.7 feet (71.8 m) p/p
- Beam: 36 feet (11 m) (molded)
- Depth: 24 feet (7.3 m) (molded)
- Installed power: Engine: 1 × 725 ihp (541 kW) 75 RPM fore-and-aft compound engine; Boilers: 2 × 98 pounds per square inch (680 kPa) firebox boilers
- Propulsion: 1 × propeller, 10.6 feet (3.2 m) in diameter
- Capacity: 40,000 bushels wheat
- Crew: 21

SS Walter L. Frost was a wooden package freighter that operated on the Great Lakes between 1883 and 1903. She was built in 1883 by the Detroit Dry Dock Company in Detroit, Michigan, and was designed to the largest permissible dimensions of the third Welland Canal. For twenty years, Walter L. Frost carried grain and general merchandise on the Chicago–Ogdensburg route, serving as part of a shipping network which connected Great Lakes ports with eastern markets via the Ogdensburg and Lake Champlain Railroad.

On November 4, 1903, she ran aground on South Manitou Island in Lake Michigan during dense fog and was declared a total loss. All 21 crew members were rescued by the United States Life-Saving Service station on the island.

The wreck site now forms part of the Manitou Passage Underwater Preserve. In November 1960, the Liberian freighter Francisco Morazan ran aground on the same shoal, passing directly over Walter L. Frost's wreck, crushing much of the remaining structure.

== History ==
=== Construction ===
The Detroit Dry Dock Company constructed Walter L. Frost as hull number #62 at their shipyard at the foot of Orleans Street on the Detroit River. The company, reorganized in 1877 from Campbell & Owen, had established a reputation for building large vessels on the Great Lakes and employed the noted naval architect Frank E. Kirby, who designed over 100 vessels during his career. Captain John C. Parker supervised construction of Walter L. Frost. The adjacent Dry Dock Engine Works manufactured her propulsion system, while Desotell & Hutton produced the boilers.

One of the first vessels designed to the dimensions of the third Welland Canal, the hull of Walter L. Frost had an overall length of 250 feet (76.2 m), a length between perpendiculars of 235 feet (71.6 m), as well as a moulded beam 36 feet (11.0 m) in width. The moulded depth, roughly speaking, the vertical height of Walter L. Frost's hull, was 24 feet (7.3 m). The measurements of her register tonnage were calculated as 1,322 gross register tons and 1,203 net register tons, respectively. The hull featured double frames throughout, molded from 6 inches (15 cm) flitch timber spaced 22 inches (56 cm) center-to-center. An advanced diagonal iron strapping system reinforced the wooden structure, with iron straps 0.5 inches (1.3 cm) thick by 4.5 inches (11 cm) wide spaced 6 feet (1.8 m) apart, riveted together where they crossed. The Detroit Post and Tribune reported extensively on the vessel's construction in July 1883, describing her as "the finest and most complete wooden vessel" the company had yet produced.

She was powered by a 725 ihp (541 kW) 75 rpm fore-and-aft compound engine; the cylinders of the engine were 28 inches (71.1 cm) and 44 inches (111.8 cm) in diameter, and had a stroke of 40 inches (101.6 cm). Steam was provided by two firebox boilers 8 feet (2.4 m) in diameter, 15.5 feet (4.7 m) in length, with a working pressure of 98-pound-per-square-inch (680 kPa). The screw propeller measured 10.6 feet (3.2 m) in diameter. Five gangways were specifically spaced to match the railroad wharf configuration at Ogdensburg, and four double hatches facilitated efficient package freight operations. The total construction cost was $120,000 ($3.42 million in 2024). Her maximum cargo capacity amounted to 40,000 bushels of wheat.

=== Career ===
Walter L. Frost was one of three sister ships—along with William A. Haskell and William J. Averill—built for the Ogdensburg line between 1883 and 1884. She was launched at the foot of Orleans Street on June 9, 1883, at 15:00.

She left Detroit, Michigan, on July 7, 1883, at 13:00 for Toledo, Ohio, to load a cargo of grain for Ogdensburg, New York. The vessel's original officers included Captain P. L. Millen, Chief Engineer J. H. Kendall, and Steward George Drake. Vessels from the Ogdensburg line frequently called at the ports of Milwaukee, Wisconsin, and Chicago, Illinois; as well as Ogdensburg, Oswego, Clayton, Cape Vincent, Morristown, and Alexandria Bay, all in New York. By 1903, Walter L. Frost was under the ownership of the Rutland Transit Company, and carried no insurance.

=== Final voyage ===
On the night of November 4, 1903, Walter L. Frost was en route from Chicago to Ogdensburg, loaded with corn and general merchandise. Entering the Manitou Passage in dense fog, the crew became disoriented. Attempting to reach the shelter of South Manitou Island ahead of an approaching storm, the vessel ran hard aground on rocky shoals at the southwest end of the island.

The ship came to rest with her bow lifted 2 feet (61 cm), aground from amidships forward on a rocky bottom. The steamer sounded distress signals, which were heard by the South Manitou Island Life-Saving Station surfmen.

=== Rescue and loss ===
The South Manitou Island Life-Saving Station had been built in 1901 and opened in August 1902—just 15 months before Walter L. Frost's loss. Upon hearing the distress signals, the station Keeper and crew launched their surfboat and rowed to the wreck in the darkness. Throughout the night of November 4–5, the 21-member crew of Walter L. Frost and the life-savers worked together, jettisoning the corn cargo overboard to lighten the ship. Two tugboats attempted to tow the ship free, but both attempts failed.

With heavy seas pounding the exposed hull on November 5, the decision was made to intentionally scuttle the vessel to prevent her from being pounded apart by wave action. The decks settled 2 feet (61 cm) underwater on the rocky bottom. The 21 crew members abandoned ship and took refuge at the Life-Saving Station, remaining on South Manitou Island for approximately one week until arrangements could be made for their evacuation.

A storm on November 11 broke the hull in two. The vessel was valued at $75,000 and the cargo at $30,000; the ship carried no insurance, though the cargo was fully covered.

=== Salvage attempts ===
In September 1904, the wrecker Manistique of the Reid Wrecking Company arrived at Glen Haven to attempt raising Walter L. Frost. Initial reports on September 14, 1904, indicated the vessel was "not broken in two as was previously reported." However, on September 21, 1904, the company received word that the propeller had "gone to pieces in the storm," and the salvage attempt was abandoned.

In August 1905, contractors Bennett & Schnorbach of Muskegon, Michigan, purchased the wreck and planned to remove her. They removed some of what remained, but the wreck was effectively abandoned after this partial salvage.

== Wreck ==
The remains of Walter L. Frost lie in 10 to 20 feet (3.0 to 6.1 m) of water off the southwest shore of South Manitou Island. The wreck falls within the Manitou Passage Underwater Preserve, established in 1988 and covering 282 square miles (730 km^{2}) with over 50 known shipwreck sites, and Sleeping Bear Dunes National Lakeshore. Michigan law protects all Great Lakes bottomlands artifacts. It consists primarily of the hull's bottom; as well as some machinery, including a boiler, the engine base, boiler plates, and various piping.

On November 29, 1960, the Liberian freighter Francisco Morazan ran aground during a snowstorm at the exact location of Walter L. Frost's wreck, crushing much of the remaining structure.
