= Oki =

Oki or Ōki may refer to:

== Places ==
- Oki District, Shimane, a district in Shimane Prefecture, Japan
- Oki Islands, an archipelago in the Sea of Japan
- Oki Province, a former province of Japan
- Ōki, Fukuoka, a town in southern Japan
- Oki Airport, the airport serving the Oki Islands
- Oki Jubilee Stadium, a stadium in Kogarah, New South Wales, also known as Jubilee Oval
- Orkney, Chapman code OKI

== Other uses ==
- Oki (surname), two separate Japanese surnames
- Oki (musician), an Ainu musician
- Oki (rapper), a Polish rapper
- OKI (company), an electronics and printer manufacturer (Oki Data)
- Super Oki, the limited express train which runs in San'in Main Line and Yamaguchi Line of West Japan Railway
- Oki, the original name of Sheriff Callie on Sheriff Callie's Wild West back when it was going to be called "Oki's Oasis"
- Oki, a doll in the Groovy Girls doll line
- Oki, a Powhatan spirit

== OKI ==
- Oki Electric Industry, a Japanese information technology company
- Ohio-Kentucky-Indiana Regional Council of Governments
- Open Knowledge Initiative, an organization that specifies software interfaces for service-oriented architecture (SOA)
- Open Knowledge International, a global UK-based non-profit network that promotes and shares information at no charge
- Organisasi Kerja Sama Islam (formerly, Organisasi Konferensi Islam), the Organisation of Islamic Cooperation in Indonesian
- Okehampton Interchange railway station, a station in Okehampton, England, UK (station code OKI)

== See also ==
- Daisen-Oki National Park, in Chūgoku region, Japan
- Okay
- Okhi Day, a Greek anniversary to commemorate Greek Prime Minister Metaxas's rejection of the ultimatum made by Mussolini
- Okie, a resident of Oklahoma
