= Manito =

Manito may refer to:

== Communities ==
=== Philippines ===
- Manito, Albay, a municipality

=== United States ===
Listed alphabetically by state

- Manito, Illinois, a village in Mason County
- Manito Township, Mason County, Illinois, a township
- Manito/Cannon Hill, Spokane, a neighborhood in the state of Washington

== People ==
- Manito, alternate name of Jesús Alejandro Pérez, Cuban-Canadian multi-instrumentalist and bandleader
- Esther Manito, British comedian

== Other uses ==
- Manito (film), a 2002 American independent film
- Manito Park, a public park in Spokane, Washington, U.S.
- USS Manito II, a United States Navy patrol vessel of World War I

== See also ==
- Manitou (disambiguation)
