= Manitou River =

Manitou River may refer to:

- Manitou River (Manitoulin Island), drains Lake Manitou on Manitoulin Island in Ontario, Canada
- Manitou River (Seine River), a tributary of the Seine River in Kenora District, Ontario, Canada
- Manitou River (Quebec) drains into the Gulf of Saint Lawrence in Quebec, Canada
- Manitou River (Minnesota) drains the North Shore of Lake Superior in Minnesota, United States

== See also ==
- Little Manitou River
- Manitou (disambiguation)
