= List of shipwrecks in September 1881 =

The list of shipwrecks in September 1881 includes ships sunk, foundered, grounded, or otherwise lost during September 1881.

== 1 September ==
List of shipwrecks: 1 September 1881
Ship	State	Description
Freia	Norway	The schooner sprang a leak and was abandoned in the North Sea 90 nautical miles (170 km) off Spurn Point, Yorkshire, United Kingdom. Her crew were rescued by the smack Earl of Mar (United Kingdom). Freia was on a voyage from Härnösand, Sweden to Le Tréport, Seine-Inférieure, France.
Marie	Norway	The ship foundered at sea. Her crew were rescued. She was on a voyage from Newcastle upon Tyne, Northumberland, United Kingdom to Arendal.

== 2 September ==
List of shipwrecks: 2 September 1881
Ship	State	Description
Freya	Norway	The barque ran aground on the Winterton Ledge, in the North Sea off the coast of Norfolk, United Kingdom and sank. Her crew were rescued by the pilot cutter Bittern (United Kingdom). Freya was on a voyage from Kragerø to Gravesend, Kent, United Kingdom.

== 3 September ==
List of shipwrecks: 3 September 1881
Ship	State	Description
Esperance	Canada	The ship ran aground in the White Sea off the mouth of the "Poulonga River" and was desctroyed by fire. Her crew were rescued.
Unnamed	Flag unknown	The schooner ran aground off Shoeburyness, Essex, United Kingdom.

== 4 September ==
List of shipwrecks: 4 September 1881
Ship	State	Description
Catherine	United Kingdom	The barque was driven ashore at North Cape, Prince Edward Island, Canada. She was on a voyage from Shediac, New Brunswick, Canada to Swansea, Glamorgan.

== 5 September ==
List of shipwrecks: 5 September 1881
Ship	State	Description
Gomer	United Kingdom	The schooner sprang a leak and foundered off Prawle Point, Devon. Her crew survived.
W. E. Gladstone	United Kingdom	The barque foundered off Cape Horn, Chile. Her crew were rescued by the barque Colomba (Italy). W. E. Gladstone was on a voyage from Pisagua, Chile to Queenstown, County Cork.

== 7 September ==
List of shipwrecks: 7 September 1881
Ship	State	Description
Annie J. Palmer	United States	The ship foundered in a hurricane with the loss of all but one of her crew. The survivor was rescued by the brigantine Rosenius (Sweden). Annie J. Palmer was on a voyage from Wilmington, Delaware to Haiti.
London	United Kingdom	The dredger was driven ashore at St. Helen's, Isle of Wight and was severely damaged.
Sarco	United Kingdom	The ship capsized in the Atlantic Ocean. Her crew took to three boats; four of them in one of the boats were rescued by Albert William (United Kingdom). Sarco was on a voyage from Newcastle upon Tyne, Northumberland to Valparaíso, Chile.

== 9 September ==
List of shipwrecks: 9 September 1881
Ship	State	Description
Fiona	United Kingdom	The yacht ran aground on the Brake Sand. She was refloated the next day and put back to Ramsgate, Kent.

== 10 September ==
List of shipwrecks: 10 September 1881
Ship	State	Description
Clarovine	United Kingdom	The barque was destroyed by fire at Milford Haven, Pembrokeshire. Her crew survived.
Mathilde	United Kingdom	The brig collided with the steamship Dwina (Flag unknown) and sank in the River Thames at Gravesend, Kent.
Unnamed	Flag unknown	The barque ran aground on the Gunfleet Sand, in the North Sea off the coast of Essex, United Kingdom.

== 11 September ==
List of shipwrecks: 11 September 1881
Ship	State	Description
Columbia	United States	The steamship foundered in Lake Michigan with the loss of fifteen of the 22 people on board. She was on a voyage from Chicago, Illinois to Collingswood, New Jersey.
Medea	Netherlands	The steamship collided with the steamship Alneholme (United Kingdom) and sank in the Baltic Sea 7 or 8 nautical miles (13 or 15 km) south by west half west of the Dragør Lightship (Denmark). All on board were rescued by Alneholme. Medea was on a voyage from Königsberg, Germany to Copenhagen, Denmark.

== 12 September ==
List of shipwrecks: 12 September 1881
Ship	State	Description
Charles Howard, and Nettlesworth	United Kingdom	The steamships collided in the London Chest and were severely damaged. Both vessels were on a voyage from Sunderland, County Durham to Kronstadt, Russia. Charles Howard was beached 4 nautical miles (7.4 km) south of Kronstadt. She was refloated and towed in to Kronstadt.

== 13 September ==
List of shipwrecks: 13 September 1881
Ship	State	Description
Houghton	United Kingdom	The steamship collided with the steamship Caribe (France) at Bordeaux, Gironde, France and was severely damaged.
Vaughan	United Kingdom	The steamship struck the pier at Riga, Russia and sprang a severe leak. She was on a voyage from Maryport, Cumberland to Riga.

== 14 September ==
List of shipwrecks: 14 September 1881
Ship	State	Description
Castello	United Kingdom	The steamship put back to Shanghai, China on fire. She was on a voyage from Shanghai to Nagasaki, Japan.

== 15 September ==
List of shipwrecks: 15 September 1881
Ship	State	Description
Allegro	United Kingdom	The schooner collided with the steamship Afton (United Kingdom) and sank off the Corsewall Lighthouse, Wigtownshire. Her crew were rescued by Afton. Allegro was on a voyage from Greenock, Renfrewshire to Foynes, County Limerick.
Faderneslandet	United Kingdom	The barque struck a sunken wreck and sprang a severe leak. She was on a voyage from England to Sweden. She put in to Copenhagen, Denmark.

== 20 September ==
List of shipwrecks: 20 September 1881
Ship	State	Description
Unnamed	United States	The steamship was run down and sunk in the Atlantic Ocean (50°29′N 36°54′W) by Anchoria (United Kingdom) with the loss of all on board.

== 21 September ==
List of shipwrecks: 21 September 1881
Ship	State	Description
Borrestad	United Kingdom	The barque sprang a severe leak in the North Sea 250 nautical miles (460 km) off the Isle of May, Fife, United Kingdom. She was on a voyage from Dublin, United Kingdom to Riga, Russia. She put in to Leith, Lothian, United Kingdom.
Star	United Kingdom	The schooner was driven ashore at Hela, Germany. Her five crew were rescued. She was on a voyage from Danzig, Germany to London.

== 22 September ==
List of shipwrecks: 22 September 1881
Ship	State	Description
Two unnamed vessels	United Kingdom	The fishing boats were wrecked at Wick, Caithness.

== 23 September ==
List of shipwrecks: 23 September 1881
Ship	State	Description
George S. Barry	Canada	The ship was abandoned off Bermuda. Her crew were rescued by the barquentine Peri (United Kingdom).
Wyoming	Flag unknown	The steamship caught fire whilst on a voyage from New York, United States to Liverpool, Lancashire, United Kingdom. The fire was extinguished and she completed her voyage.
Several unnamed vessels	Switzerland	The vessels were wrecked in Lake Brienz with loss of life.

== 24 September ==
List of shipwrecks: 24 September 1881
Ship	State	Description
D. N. Petrochino	Greece	The barque was beached 6 nautical miles (11 km) of Damietta, Egypt. She was on a voyage from Leith, Lothian, United Kingdom to Damietta. She was later refloated and towed in to Port Said, Egypt.
Gezina	Netherlands	The full-rigged ship foundered in the North Sea. Her crew were rescued by Meliors (United Kingdom). Gezina was on a voyage from Newcastle upon Tyne, Northumberland, United Kingdom to Narva, Russia.
Independenza	Flag unknown	The barque first hit the Crim Rocks in the Isles of Scilly, United Kingdom, and later the Barrel of Butter rock on The Garrison where she sank. Her crew took to the ship's boat and survived. She was on a voyage guano from Pabella de Pica, Chile to Rotterdam, South Holland, Netherlands.
Roumania	United Kingdom	The steamship ran aground on the Leman Sand, in the North Sea. She was on a voyage from Kronstadt, Russia to Rouen, Seine-Inférieure, France. She was refloated but consequently sank. Her crew were rescued by the smack Proceed (United Kingdom).
St. Pierre	United Kingdom	The ship was driven ashore and wrecked at "Wiran", Russia. Her crew were rescued. She was on a voyage from Kronstadt, Russia to Bordeaux, Gironde.
Thresher	United States	The schooner was driven ashore at Cape Sable, Florida and was destroyed by fire. Her crew were rescued.
Unnamed	Russia	The schooner was wrecked at Odesa with the loss of her captain. She was on a voyage from Nicholaieff to Odesa.

== 25 September ==
List of shipwrecks: 25 September 1881
Ship	State	Description
Ash	United Kingdom	The steamship departed from Nagasaki, Japan for Shanghai, China. No further trace. She may have foundered in the "Poto Islands" before 5 October.
Louis	France	The brig collided with the barque Seiriol Wyn (United Kingdom) and sank in the English Channel 10 nautical miles (19 km) south west of Beachy Head, Sussex, United Kingdom with the loss of seven of her eight crew. The survivor was rescued by Seriol Wyn. Louis was on a voyage from Saint-Malo, Ille-et-Vilaine to Riga, Russia.

== 26 September ==
List of shipwrecks: 26 September 1881
Ship	State	Description
Mary	United Kingdom	The ship was wrecked on Quelpart, Korea with the loss of sixteen lives. She was on a voyage from Yantai, China for Vladivostok, Russia.

== 27 September ==
List of shipwrecks: 27 September 1881
Ship	State	Description
Furnessia	United Kingdom	The steamship ran aground in the Clyde.

== 28 September ==
List of shipwrecks: 28 September 1881
Ship	State	Description
Charlton	United Kingdom	The steamship departed from Sydney, New South Wales for Hong Kong. No further trace, reported overdue.
Jarvis Lord	United States	The steamship was driven ashore on Ile Parisienne, Ontario, Canada. Subsequently refloated and returned to service.
William J. Taylor	United Kingdom	The steamship was hit amidships by the steamship Plover (United Kingdom), in the Warp Channel at the mouth of the River Thames and sank with the loss of all hands.

== 29 September ==
List of shipwrecks: 29 September 1881
Ship	State	Description
William J. Taylor	United Kingdom	The steamship collided with the steamship Plover (United Kingdom) and sank in the Thames Estuary off the Nore. All on board were rescued by Plover. William J. Taylor was on a voyage from Penzance, Cornwall to London.

== 30 September ==
List of shipwrecks: 30 September 1881
Ship	State	Description
Gertrude	United Kingdom	The steamship was driven ashore in Dundrum Bay. She was refloated on 5 October and taken in to Belfast, County Antrim.
Naples	United Kingdom	The steamship caught fire at Singapore, Straits Settlements. She was on a voyage from Hong Kong to Shanghai, China.
Saphir	Norway	The barque ran aground at Maryport, Cumberland, United Kingdom. She was on a voyage from Maryport to New York, United States.
Unnamed	France	The lighter was run into and sunk by the steamship Ben Voirlich (United Kingdom) at Bordeaux, Gironde.

== Unknown date ==
List of shipwrecks: Unknown date in September 1881
Ship	State	Description
Alice Buck	United States	The full-rigged ship was wrecked near San Francisco, California with the loss of ten lives.
Alma	Denmark	The schooner was abandoned in the North Sea before 4 September.
Alma	United Kingdom	The Mersey Flat sank in the River Mersey.
Anna	Flag unknown	The schooner was abandoned in the North Sea. She was towed in to Lowestoft, Suffolk, United Kingdomby the lugger Martha and the tug Sampson (both United Kingdom).
Avalon	United Kingdom	The steamship was damaged by fire at Rotterdam, South Holland, Netherlands. She arrived at Gravesend, Kent for repair on 24 September.
Calista Hawes	Canada	The ship sprang a leak off Sea Island, Nova Scotia. Her crew mutinied, set her on fire and abandoned her. She was on a voyage from New York, United States to Trieste.
Ceres	United Kingdom	The ship ran aground at Pernambuco, Brazil. She was on a voyage from Penedo, Brazil to Hull, Yorkshire.
Christoph Carstens	Germany	The schooner ran aground at "Sondreross". She was on a voyage from Newcastle upon Tyne, Northumberland, United Kingdom to Riga, Russia.
Colombia	United States of Colombia	The steamship was wrecked at Barranquilla. Her crew were rescued.
Elisa	Sweden	The ship was driven ashore on Rønne, Denmark. She was on a voyage from Helsinki, Grand Duchy of Finland to Grimsby, Lincolnshire, United Kingdom.
Elizabeth Irving	Flag unknown	A number of crew drowned in the Fraser River while trying to escape from the burning steamship.
Ella	United States	The schooner foundered at sea with the loss of her captain and mate. She was on a voyage from Boston, Massachusetts to Baracoa, Cuba.
Europa	Regia Marina	The transport ship was driven ashore on Thursday Island, Queensland. She was later refloated.
Facina	Norway	The barque was wrecked on the Gunleet Sand, in the North Sea off the coast of Essex, United Kingdom.
Jardine Brothers	Canada	The ship was driven ashore in the Magdalen Islands, Nova Scotia.
Jenny	United Kingdom	The ship foundered in the North Sea. Her crew were rescued. She was on a voyage from Fraserburgh, Aberdeenshire, United Kingdom to Stettin, Germany.
Lancefield	United Kingdom	The barque was driven ashore. She was on a voyage from Saint John, New Brunswick Canada to Liverpool, Lancashire. She was refloated and taken in to Halifax, Nova Scotia in a leaky condition.
Lord Dufferin	United Kingdom	The ship ran aground at Philadelphia, Pennsylvania, United States. She was on a voyage from Philadelphia to Belfast, County Antrim. She was refloated and resumed her voyage.
Madeleine	France	The lugger was wrecked on the Gunfleet Sand. Sixteen people were rescued from her.
Maid	United Kingdom	The schooner was driven ashore in the River Bann.
Nicanor	Norway	The ship put in to Caraquet, New Brunswick, Canada in a waterlogged condition.
Orpana	Russia	The schooner was driven ashore at Kristiansand, Norway. She was declared a total loss.
St Louis	Flag unknown	The brig collided with Seriol Wyn (Flag unknown) and sank off Beachy Head, Sussex with the loss of eight of her crew.
Thunder	United Kingdom	The steamship was driven ashore near Zakynthos, Greece. She was on a voyage from Messina, Sicily, Italy to Patras, Greece. Thunder was refloated with assistance from the steamship Copia (United Kingdom) and completed her voyage.
Two Sisters	United Kingdom	The ship was wrecked at Digby, Nova Scotia. Her crew were rescued. She was on a voyage from Saint John, New Brunswick to Ballyshannon, County Donegal.
Valparaiso	Norway	The barque was abandoned in the North Sea. She was on a voyage from Grimsby to Sundsvall.
William Gowland	United Kingdom	The ship struck a submerged object and was beached at Bridlington, Yorkshire. Her crew were rescued. She was on a voyage from London to Middlesbrough, Yorkshire.
Unnamed	[[|]]	The lighter sank at Saint Petersburg.
