= Cramer, Minnesota =

Unincorporated community in Minnesota, United States

- Unincorporated community
- Location within Minnesota Location within the United States
- Coordinates: 47°31′38″N 91°05′25″W
- Country: United States
- State: Minnesota
- County: Lake
- Elevation: 1,401 ft (427 m)

Population
  - Total: 10
- Time zone: UTC-6 (Central (CST))
  - Summer (DST): UTC-5 (CDT)
- Area code: 218
- GNIS feature ID: 655850

Cramer is an unincorporated community in Lake County, Minnesota, United States.

The community is located 23 miles northeast of Silver Bay at the intersection of Lake County Road 7 (Cramer Road) and Lake County Road 8. Cramer is located 11 miles west of Schroeder.

Cramer Lake, Kowalski Lake, and George H. Crosby Manitou State Park are in the vicinity.

Cramer is 12 miles northeast of the community of Finland on Lake County Road 7.

Cramer is located within Lake No. 1 Unorganized Territory of Lake County.

== History ==
A post office called Cramer was established in 1911, and remained in operation until 1917. The community was named for J. N. Cramer, a local pioneer merchant.
