= Ahone =

Important spirit and creator in the religion of the Powhatan people

Ahone (also known as Rawottonemd) was a prominent spirit and creator in the religion of the Native American Powhatan people. According to Powhatan mythology, Ahone created the world as a flat disk with the Powhatan people at its center. Ahone didn't interact directly with mankind and required no offerings or sacrifices, unlike many other spirits. Oki was Alhone's opposite in everything, thus Oki interacted directly with the Powhatans and expected offerings.

== See also ==
- Gitche Manitou
- Wakan Tanka
- Great Spirit
