= Agudar =

Agudar ('Creator') is the creator god in Aleutian mythology. The name is also alternately rendered as Agurur, Agûģuq, Agugux, Agu'gux or Agu'gux'.

Agudar is a universal force, similar to the concept of Great Spirit in other Native American religions. They are believed to be the creator of the universe, a hunting deity who watches over animals and hunters, a reincarnation deity and a solar deity.

There is not much documented information about Agudar.

== Worship and rituals ==
The worship of Agudar by men and women were performed separately, in sacred places such as caves. Only adult males were allowed in sacred ceremonies. When someone dies, commoners and slaves are cremated, and children and the upper class are mummified by stuffing the body with grass and oil and wrapped in fur before burial.

Ioannin Veniaminov, a member of the Russian Orthodoxy, noted a ritual where at dawn everyone would face the sun, open their mouths, and swallow the light because daylight represents life. Stepan Cherepanov noted that when hunting with the Aleut people, they would say a prayer asking for aid.

After the introduction and influence of Russian Orthodoxy, Agudar was also used to refer to the Christian God.
