= Manitou Passage Underwater Preserve =

Protected area in Michigan, United States

- Location within Michigan
- Location: Lake Michigan, Leelanau County, Michigan USA
- Nearest city: Empire, Michigan
- Coordinates: 45°00′18″N 85°58′05″W
- Governing body: Michigan Department of Natural Resources

The Manitou Passage Underwater Preserve is a preservation area in the U.S. state of Michigan. Located in Lake Michigan, it completely surrounds North Manitou Island and South Manitou Island. It includes much of that portion of Lake Michigan that borders the federally protected Sleeping Bear Dunes National Lakeshore.

== History ==
The Manitou Passage carries a significant percentage of the commercial water traffic that is upbound or downbound in Lake Michigan. For this reason, the Manitou Passage Underwater Preserve is rich in Lake freighter wrecks of all kinds.

There are 33 recreational diving sites in the Manitou Preserve, almost all of which are also within the boundary of the National Lakeshore. The sites include shipwrecks and maritime-related facilities such as old docks. Popular dive sites include:

- Alva Bradley
- PJ Ralph
- JB Newland
- Congress
- Three Brothers
- Jarvis Lord
