= Okeus =

Oki (modern orthography: oki; Powhatan Syllabics: ᐅᑭ) is a powerful spiritual being in the traditional religion of the Powhatan people, part of the larger Algonquian-speaking cultural group Indigenous to the Virginia Tidewater region. He is best understood as a force of natural law, balance, and spiritual reciprocity rather than as a "god" in the Western or Christian sense.

== Etymology and language ==
In modern Powhatan orthography, oki simply means a spirit, force, or sacred presence. The term has parallels in many Algonquian languages, including Anishinaabe manitow, Cree manitow, and Lenape manetu, all of which refer to spirit beings of various kinds. The term was likely used generically as well as specifically.

== Cultural role ==
Oki was associated with natural forces, sacred places, and the power that animates the world. Offerings to oki were common, particularly before crossing rivers, entering forests, or harvesting from the land. This was not due to fear, but out of respect and the understanding that spiritual forces required acknowledgment and balance. Oki could be protective or punishing depending on whether harmony with the natural and spiritual world was maintained. Contrary to some early colonial accounts, oki was not a "malevolent" or "wrathful" deity. Such descriptions likely stem from misunderstandings by English settlers unfamiliar with Algonquian cosmology. The dualistic European concept of a "good god" versus a "devil" does not map cleanly onto Powhatan beliefs. Oki was a powerful spirit, neither wholly benevolent nor malevolent, but a force to be respected.

== Misrepresentation in colonial accounts ==
The early Jamestown chroniclers, including William Strachey and John Smith, often misunderstood or mischaracterized indigenous beliefs. Strachey described Okeus (an Anglicized rendering of oki) as a kind of "devil" worshipped to avoid his wrath, contrasting him with a supposedly benevolent being called Ahone. However, this binary misrepresents Powhatan spirituality. Scholars such as Helen C. Rountree and Ives Goddard have argued that these were gross oversimplifications and projections of Christian dualism.

== Modern interpretation ==
In modern Powhatan cultural revitalization, oki is reclaimed as a central and neutral-to-positive spiritual force. He is not a devil, but a presence that demands respect, much like natural law. The continued offering of tobacco, acknowledgment of sacred sites, and prayers to oki are part of traditional practice.

== See also ==
- Ahone, Oki's twin
- List of Native American deities
- Powhatan people
- Manitou
