= Lake No. 1, Minnesota =

Unorganized territory of Lake County, Minnesota, United States

Coordinates: 47°39′33″N 91°05′59″W

Lake No. 1
- Unorganized territory
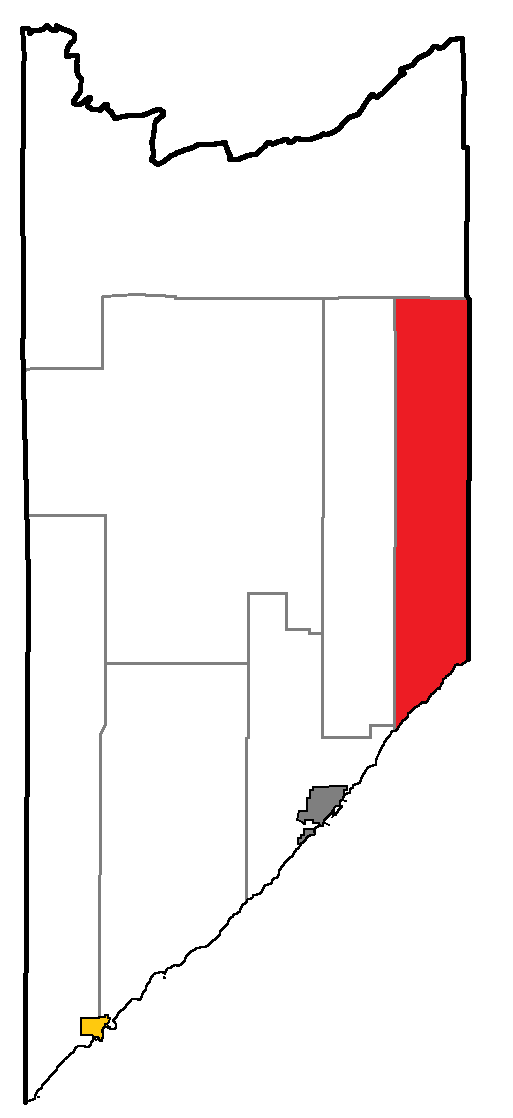
- Location of Lake No. 1 within Lake County, Minnesota
- Country: United States
- State: Minnesota
- County: Lake

Area
  - Total: 191.7 sq mi (496.5 km^{2})
  - Land: 177.7 sq mi (460.3 km^{2})
  - Water: 0.11 sq mi (0.29 km^{2})

Population (2020)
  - Total: 142
  - Density: 0.75/sq mi (0.29/km^{2})
- Time zone: UTC-6 (Central (CST))
  - Summer (DST): UTC-5 (CDT)
- Area code: 218

Lake No. 1 is an unorganized territory in Lake County, Minnesota, United States. The population was 142 at the 2020 United States census.

== Geography ==
According to the United States Census Bureau, the unorganized territory has a total area of 191.7 square miles (496.5 km^{2}), of which 177.7 square miles (460.3 km^{2}) of it is land and 14.0 square miles (36.2 km^{2}) of it (7.29%) is water.

=== Unincorporated communities ===
The following unincorporated communities are located within Lake No. 1 Unorganized Territory :

- Cramer
- Little Marais

== Demographics ==
As of the census of 2000, there were 117 people, 54 households, and 34 families residing in the unorganized territory. The population density was 0.7 inhabitants per square mile (0.27/km^{2}). There were 183 housing units at an average density of 1.0 per square mile (0.39/km^{2}). The racial makeup of the unorganized territory was 97.44% White, 0.85% Native American, 0.85% Asian, and 0.85% from two or more races.

There were 54 households, out of which 18.5% had children under the age of 18 living with them, 59.3% were married couples living together, and 35.2% were non-families. 31.5% of all households were made up of individuals, and 7.4% had someone living alone who was 65 years of age or older. The average household size was 2.17 and the average family size was 2.66.

In the unorganized territory the population was spread out, with 16.2% under the age of 18, 5.1% from 18 to 24, 24.8% from 25 to 44, 32.5% from 45 to 64, and 21.4% who were 65 years of age or older. The median age was 47 years. For every 100 females, there were 116.7 males. For every 100 females age 18 and over, there were 117.8 males.

The median income for a household in the unorganized territory was $30,521, and the median income for a family was $31,771. Males had a median income of $31,250 versus $30,417 for females. The per capita income for the unorganized territory was $21,321. There were no families and 14.0% of the population living below the poverty line, including no under eighteens and none of those over 64.
