= Manitou Park =

Manitou Park may refer to:

- George H. Crosby Manitou State Park, Minnesota, in Lake county
- Manitou Islands Provincial Park, Ontario, a provincial park near North Bay
- Manitou Park, British Columbia, in the Naramata community
- Manitou Park, Ontario, a neighbourhood in Sault Ste. Marie
- Manitou Park School House, New Jersey, an NRHP property
- Manitou Park Recreation Area, Colorado, a Pikes National Forest recreation area in Teller County

== See also ==
- Mount Manitou Park, Manitou Springs, Colorado, a former summit park accessed using the Manitou Incline funicular railway
