= Oki (surname) =

Oki, Ōki, Ooki or Ohki (written: 大木 lit. "big tree") is a Japanese surname. Notable people with the surname include:

- Bibiru Ōki (大木 ビビる, born 1974), Japanese comedian
- Eiji Oki (大木 英司), Japanese engineer
- Enkichi Ōki (大木 遠吉, 1871–1926), Japanese statesman
- Kintarō Ōki (大木 金太郎, 1929–2006), South Korean professional wrestler
- Masao Ōki (大木 正夫, 1901–1971), Japanese composer
- Risa Ohki (大木 理紗), Japanese singer
- Satoru Oki (大木 暁, born 1992), Japanese footballer
- Seikan Oki (大木 正幹, 1907–2000), Japanese sprinter
- Susumu Oki (大木 勉, born 1976), Japanese footballer
- Ōki Takatō (大木 喬任, 1832–1899), Japanese statesman
- Takeshi Oki (大木 武, born 1961), Japanese footballer and manager
- Tamio Ōki (大木 民夫, born 1928–2017), Japanese voice actor
- Tony Ooki (大木 トニー, born 1971), Japanese AV actor and singer

Fictional characters:

- Tatsumichi Oki (大木 立道), a character in the manga series Battle Royale
- Tsuyoshi Ohki (大木 剛), a character in the manga series Kodomo no Omocha

Oki (written: 沖 lit. "open sea") is also a separate Japanese surname. Notable people with the surname include:

- Itaru Oki (沖 至, 1941–2020), Japanese jazz musician
- Kanae Oki (沖 佳苗, born 1984), Japanese voice actress
- Oki Kibatarō (沖 牙太郎, 1848–1906), Japanese businessman
- Masaya Oki (沖 雅也, 1952–1983), Japanese actor and singer
- Miho Oki (沖 美穂, born 1974), Japanese cyclist
