= SS Francisco Morazan (1922) =

German built cargo ship wrecked in Lake Michigan

Coordinates: 44.9966°N 86.1417°W

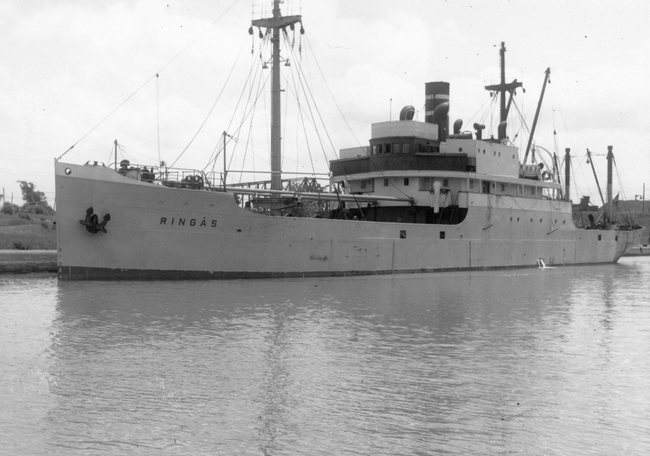
- SS Ringås

History
- Name: Arcadia (1922–34); Elbing (1934–45); Empire Congress (1945–46); Brunes (1946–47); Skuld (1947–48); Ringås (1948–58); Los Mayas (1958); Francisco Morazan (1958–60)
- Owner: Hamburg-Amerika Packetfahrt AG (1922–34); Kohlen-Import & Poseidon Schiffahrt AG (1934–40); Kriegsmarine (1940–43); Kohlen-Import & Poseidon Schiffahrt AG (1943–45); Ministry of War Transport (1945); Ministry of Transport (1945–46); Norwegian Government (1946–47); R Mithassel (1947–48); Birger Ekerholt (1948–58); Unknown Greek owner (1958); C T Trapezountios (1958–60)
- Operator: Deutsche Levante Linie (1922–34); Kohlen-Import & Poseidon Schiffahrt AG (1934–40); Kriegsmarine (1940–43); Kohlen-Import & Poseidon Schiffahrt AG (1943–45); Chine Trading Co Ltd (1945–46); Kr Jebsen (1946–47); R Mithassel (1947–48); Birger Ekerholt (1948–58); Moa Navigation SA (1958); West Indies Transport Company (1958–60)
- Port of registry: (Weimar Republic) Hamburg (1922–33); (Nazi Germany) Hamburg (1933–34); (Nazi Germany) Königsberg (1934–40); (Nazi Germany) Kriegsmarine (1940–43); (Nazi Germany) Königsberg (1943–45); (Nazi Germany) Nordenham (1945); (United Kingdom) London (1945–46); (Norway) Oslo (1947–58); Panama City (1958); (Liberia) Monrovia (1958–60)
- Builder: Deutsche Werft
- Yard number: 19
- Launched: June 1922
- Out of service: 29 November 1960
- Identification: Code Letters RCSM (1922–34); Code Letters DHBK (1934–45); Code Letters GFSV (1945–46); United Kingdom Official Number 180691 (1945–46)
- Fate: Wrecked

General characteristics
- Type: Cargo ship
- Tonnage: 1,441 GRT; 747 NRT; 2,091DWT
- Length: 234 ft 5 in (71.45 m)
- Beam: 36 ft 8 in (11.18 m)
- Draught: 16 feet 6 1/2 inches (5.042 m)
- Depth: 17 ft 9 in (5.41 m)
- Installed power: Two steam turbines, double reduction geared, driving one shaft (1922-35); Compound steam engine (1935-60)
- Propulsion: Screw propeller (1922-35); Twin screw propellers (1935-60)
- Speed: 9 knots (17 km/h)
- Crew: 19
- Notes: Sister ship Ambria

Francisco Morazan was a 1,442 GRT cargo ship that was built in 1922 as Arcadia by Deutsche Werft, Hamburg, for German owners. She was sold in 1934 and renamed Elbing. She was seized by the Allies in the River Elbe, Germany in May 1945, passed to the United Kingdom's Ministry of War Transport and renamed Empire Congress. In 1946, she was allocated to the Norwegian Government and renamed Brunes.

Brunes was sold into merchant service in 1947 and renamed Skuld. In 1948, another sale saw her renamed Ringås. In 1958, she was sold to Liberia and renamed Los Mayas and then Francisco Morazan (for Francisco Morazán) the following year. She served until 29 November 1960 when she ran aground in Lake Michigan and was declared a total loss. In an intriguing twist of fate, the wreck is about 40 miles north of Arcadia Dunes and the village of Arcadia, Michigan. (Arcadia being the ship's original name.)

== Description ==
The ship was built in 1922 by Deutsche Werft AG, Hamburg, as yard number 19.

The ship was 234 feet 5 inches (71.45 m) long, with a beam of 36 feet 8 inches (11.18 m). She had a depth of 17 feet 9 inches (5.41 m), and a draught of 16 feet 6 1/2 inches (5.042 m). She had a GRT of 1,141 and a NRT of 747, with a DWT of 2,097.

As built, she was propelled by two steam turbines, double reduction geared, driving a single screw propeller. The turbines were built by Allgemeine Elektricitäts-Gesellschaft, Berlin.

== History ==
Arcadia was built for Hamburg Amerikanische Packetfahrt AG, Hamburg. She was launched In June 1922. Arcadia was operated under the management of Deutsche Levant Linie AG. Her port of registry was Hamburg and the Code Letters RCSM were allocated. In 1934, her Code Letters were changed to DHBK.

In 1934, Arcadia was sold to Kohlen-Import und Poseidon Schiffahrt, Königsberg and was renamed Elbing. A new four-cylinder compound steam engine was fitted in 1935. The engine had two cylinders of 13 inches (33 cm) and two cylinders of 27 9/16 inches (70.0 cm) diameter by 27 9/16 inches (70.0 cm) stroke.

In 1940, Elbing was requisitioned by the Kriegsmarine for use as a coal ship in Operation Sea Lion. In March 1941 she was set on fire after being shelled by HMS Tartar during Operation Claymore and beached at Solvær, Lofoten Islands, Norway. Subsequently repaired, she saw service in Norwegian waters in 1942 and was returned to Kohlen-Import und Poseidon Schiffahrt in 1943. In 1945, her port of registry was changed to Nordenham. She was damaged after being shelled by land-based artillery and beached on Schweinesand island. In May 1945, Elbing was seized in the River Elbe. She was passed to the Ministry of War Transport and renamed Empire Congress. Her port of registry was changed to London. The Code Letters GFSV and United Kingdom Official Number 180691 were allocated. She was placed under the management of Chine Trading Co Ltd, Cardiff.

In 1946, Empire Congress was allocated to the Norwegian government. She was renamed Brunes. She was operated under the management of Kr Jebsen. In 1947, she was sold to R Mithassel, Norway and renamed Skuld. In 1948, Mithassel was taken over by Birger Ekerholt and the ship was renamed Ringås. On 30 June 1952, the Belgian Victory ship Mahenge collided with the French Liberty ship Granville north of Alderney, Channel Islands. Ringås rescued the 46 crew and three passengers from Mahenge, which sank. Granville was badly damaged and set on fire. She was towed into Cherbourg, France after the fire had been extinguished. In 1952, Ringås made her first voyage to the Great Lakes, delivering a cargo of china clay to Muskegon, Michigan. In 1953, she delivered a cargo of pulpwood to Port Huron, Michigan. In 1958, Ringås was sold to a Greek owner and renamed Los Mayos. She was operated placed under the Panamanian Flag and operated under the management of Moa Navigation SA. Los Mayos visited the Great Lakes in 1958. She ran aground at Muskegon and was holed. In 1959, she was sold to C T Trapezountios, Monrovia, Liberia, and was renamed Francisco Morazan. She was operated by the West Indies Transport Company of New York and Monrovia and chartered to Interamerican Marine Operators, New York.

=== Loss ===
Map of South Manitou Island, showing the position of Francisco Morazan.

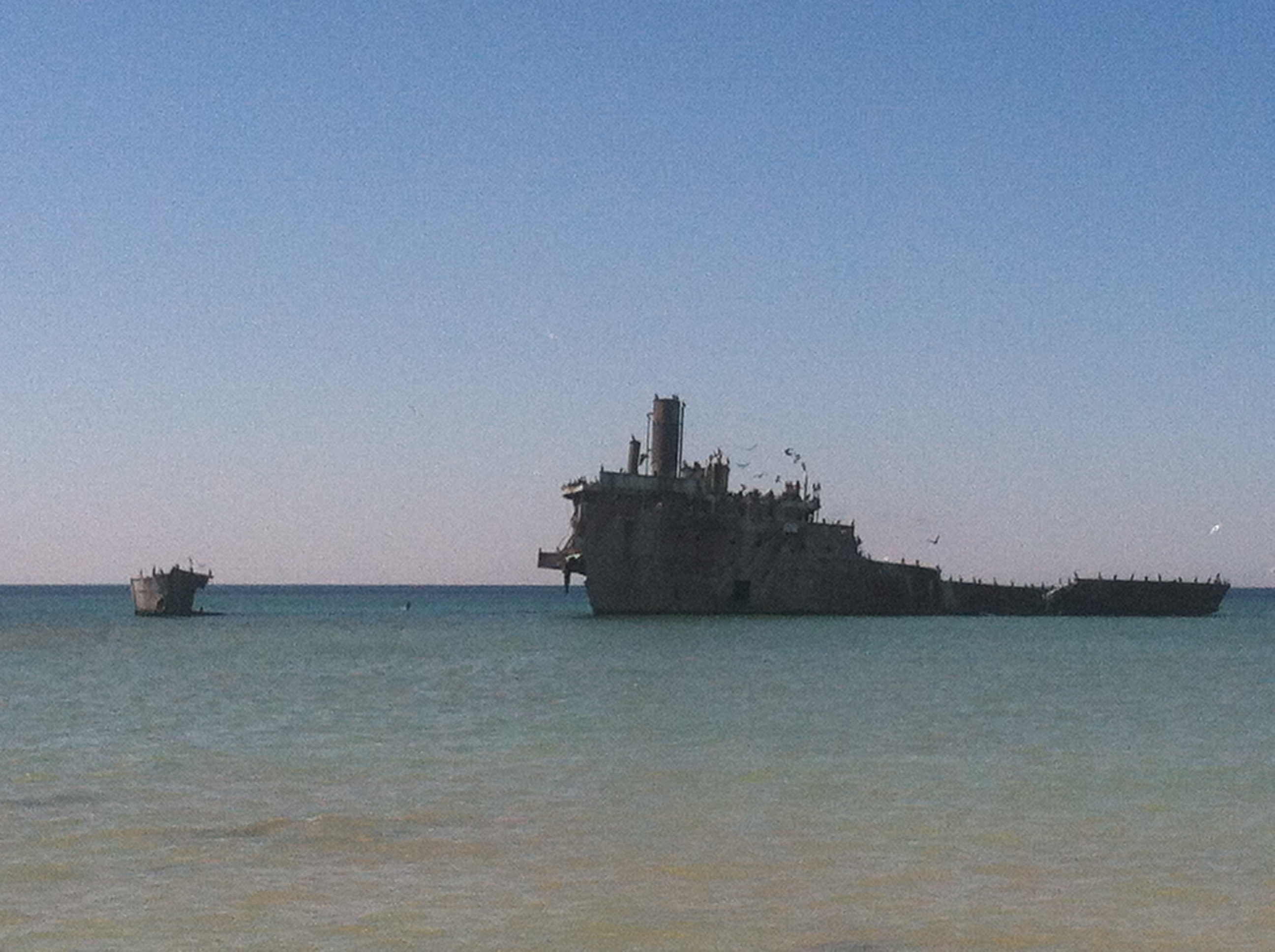
Photo of the shipwreck.

On 21 October 1960, Francisco Morazan began what was to be her last voyage from Miami, Florida. She sailed to Montreal and Toronto, where she unloaded a cargo of phosphates. Francisco Morazan then sailed to Chicago, arriving there in mid-November. At Chicago, 1,118 tons, 10 cwt of mixed cargo was loaded, destined for Rotterdam, Netherlands and Hamburg, Germany. The cargo included aluminium, baled hair, bottle caps, canned chicken, castings, chemicals, Gilsonite, hides, lard, machinery, phosphate, scrap metal, solder dross, tinplate, and toys. Francisco Morazan departed Chicago on 28 November. Fog on Lake Michigan slowed her progress and a problem with the feed pump for the boiler required the ship to be stopped while the pump was repaired. This meant Francisco Morazan was now in a race to leave the Great Lakes before the system closed to navigation on 3 December.

During the night of 28/29 November, a snowstorm greatly reduced visibility and the ship was pushed off course. At 18:35 on 29 November, Francisco Morazan ran aground on the South Manitou Island shoal, passing over the wreck of SS Walter L. Frost on her way. She ended up just 300 yards (270 m) from the shore.

The USCGC Mesquite, soon followed by the USCGC Mackinaw, arrived to help the next morning, 30 November. With ten- to twelve-foot waves battering the shore of South Manitou, the two ships were unable to send ship's boats to the Morazan or approach closely so the USCGC Sundew was sent with a breeches buoy. Before she arrived early on 1 December, the weather moderated and a ship's boat from Mackinaw was able to take off the two-months-pregnant wife of the Morazan's captain. She was then airlifted from Mackinaw to Traverse City. The salvage tug John Roan V and its companion barge Maintland also joined the rescuers on 1 December. They and Mackinaw remained on scene while Sundew and Mesquite departed that night. Morazan's owners dispatched a salvage engineer and an insurance agent from New York who, along with salvage engineers from Roan Salvage of Sturgeon Bay, were airlifted to Morazan the following day, 2 December, to evaluate the ship's condition. Their conclusion was that although the cargo could perhaps be salvaged by Roan, the solidly grounded Morazan could not. The captain, twelve crewmen and the two owner's representatives remained on board Morazan until deteriorating weather started to break up the ship. They were taken off by Mackinaw's ship's boats on 4 December and carried to Traverse City.

After some days, Roan Salvage abandoned their intention to salvage the cargo and their ships returned to port.

=== Aftermath ===
In January 1961, representatives from the insurers of the cargo awarded a contract to Lake Michigan Hardwood Co. for the salvage of the cargo from Francisco Morazan. Lake Michigan Hardwood Co engaged George Grosvenor of Leland, Michigan to assist in the operation. Grosvenor owned a small mail boat, Smiling Thru which was able to operate in shallow water. The plan was that the salvaged cargo would be transferred from Smiling Thru to the Lake Michigan Hardwood Co's Glen Shore for delivery to Leland, from where it would be taken by road to Chicago. Only about 5 tons of canned chicken and hides were recovered before salvage was abandoned due to storms.

Over the years, part of the cargo was salvaged by the islanders for their own use. The Blue Star brand canned chicken was spoken highly of by the islanders. Amongst the cargo of toys were balsa wood model aircraft kits made by Monogram of Chicago, which proved popular with local boys. In August 1967, a local boy drowned while exploring the wreck of Francisco Morazan. In August 1968, Attorney General Frank Kelley filed a lawsuit to have the wreck of the ship removed. He claimed that the rotting cargo was a health hazard and the 6,500 US gallons (25,000 L) of fuel oil posed a pollution risk. The following day, Francisco Morazan was found to be on fire and the cargo was entirely consumed. Two of the three defendants in the lawsuit disappeared and the lawsuit was later dropped. The wreck of Francisco Morazan is now the property of the State of Michigan.
