= Manitoulin =

Manitoulin may refer to:

All located in or associated with Ontario, Canada

- Manitoulin (provincial electoral district), a former electoral district
- Manitoulin District, located in the northeastern part of the province
- Manitoulin Dolomite, a geologic formation
- Manitoulin Expositor, a weekly newspaper
- Manitoulin Island, an island in Lake Huron
- Manitoulin Secondary School, located on M'Chigeeng First Nation

== See also ==
- Manitou (disambiguation)
