= SS Philippines Victory =

Victory ship of the United States

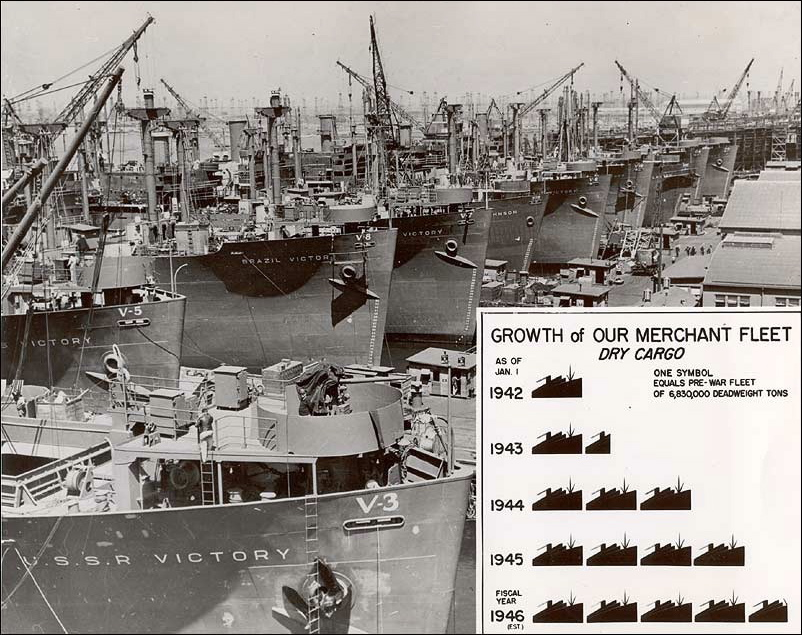
- Second ship, with V-5 on the hull, is the SS Philippines Victory, the fifth Victory ship.

History

United States
- Name: Philippines Victory
- Namesake: Philippines
- Owner: War Shipping Administration
- Operator: Alcoa Steamship Company
- Port of registry: (United States) Los Angeles
- Builder: California Shipbuilding Company, Los Angeles
- Laid down: January 17, 1944
- Launched: March 11, 1944
- Completed: May 9, 1944
- Fate: Sold April 23, 1947, to Belgium

Belgium
- Name: Mahenge
- Namesake: Mahenge offensive
- Owner: Cie. Maritime Congolaise
- Operator: Cie. Maritime Congolaise
- Port of registry: (Belgium) Antwerp
- Fate: Sank after collision with SS Granville in the English Channel on June 30, 1952

General characteristics
- Class & type: VC2-S-AP3 Victory ship
- Tonnage: 7612 GRT, 4,553 NRT
- Displacement: 15,200 tons
- Length: 455 ft (139 m)
- Beam: 62 ft (19 m)
- Draught: 28 ft (8.5 m)
- Installed power: 8,500 shp (6,300 kW)
- Propulsion: HP & LP turbines geared to a single 20.5-foot (6.2 m) propeller, by Westinghouse Electric & Mfg. Co., Essington
- Speed: 16.5 knots
- Boats & landing craft carried: 4 Lifeboats
- Complement: 62 Merchant Marine and 28 US Naval Armed Guards
- Armament: 1 × 5 inch (127 mm)/38 caliber gun as Victory ship; 1 × 3 inch (76 mm)/50 caliber gun; 8 × 20 mm Oerlikon

SS Philippines Victory was the fifth Victory ship built during World War II. She was launched by the California Shipbuilding Company on March 11, 1944, and completed on May 9, 1944. She was built in 113 days under the Emergency Shipbuilding program.

Philippines Victory was one of the new 10,500-ton class ship to be known as Victory ships designed to replace the earlier Liberty Ships. Liberty ships were designed to be used just for World War II. Victory ships were designed to last longer and serve the US Navy after the war. The Victory ship differed from a Liberty ship in that they were: faster, longer and wider, taller, had a thinner stack set farther toward the superstructure and had a long raised forecastle.

Philippines Victory served in the Pacific Ocean during World War II.

== Construction ==
The ship's United States Maritime Commission designation was VC2-S-AP3, hull number 5 (V-5).

On March 11, 1944 Philippines Victory was christened by Mrs. Carmen Soriano, wife of Andres Soriano, Secretary of Finance to President Manuel Quezon of the Philippines and launched at Wilmington, Los Angeles. The ship was completed and delivered to the wartime operator of all United States oceangoing shipping, the War Shipping Administration (WSA), on May 9, 1944. Philippines Victory was assigned to Alcoa Steamship Company under a standard WSA operating agreement at that time. That agreement continued until the ship's lay up May 3, 1944.

== World War II ==
Philippines Victory served in the Pacific theater in World War II as a cargo ship. On her maiden voyage she steamed with supplies for troops to: Hawaii, Australia and then New Guinea. She was laid up for a short time in 1946 at Suisun Bay in California as part of the National Defense Reserve Fleet, until sold in 1947.

== SS Mahenge ==
She was sold to the Belgian shipping company Compagnie Maritime Congolaise (a subsidiary of Compagnie Maritime Belge), registered at Antwerp as Mahenge, and used as a cargo liner in services with the Belgian Congo. On June 30, 1952, while on a voyage from Antwerp to the Matadi, she collided with the French steamship Granville near the Casquets—a group of rocks off Alderney in the English Channel. In the collision, which occurred under fog, the bows of the French ship cut into a hold of Mahenge containing a shipment of matches, which caught fire. Mahenge sank at 49.48°N 2.18°W. The full crew and 3 passengers were rescued by the Norwegian cargo ship Ringås.

In 2007 divers found what they believe to be Mahenge, standing upright on the sea floor with a slight list to port and the derricks still intact.

Typical Victory Ship, the Red Oak Victory

== See also ==
- List of Victory ships

== Sources ==
- Sawyer, L.A. and W.H. Mitchell. Victory ships and tankers: The history of the ‘Victory’ type cargo ships and of the tankers built in the United States of America during World War II, Cornell Maritime Press, 1974, 0-87033-182-5.
- United States Maritime Commission:
- Victory Cargo Ships
