= Manitou Lake =

Manitou Lake may refer to several places:

== Canada ==
- In Ontario
  - Lake Manitou on Manitoulin Island in Manitoulin District, Ontario
- In Quebec
  - Lake Manitou (Lac-Jérôme), in Lac-Jérôme, Minganie RCM, on the Manitou river
- In Saskatchewan
  - Little Manitou Lake (sometimes called Manitou Lake), near Watrous
  - Manitou Lake (Saskatchewan), south of Lloydminster
  - Rural Municipality of Manitou Lake No. 442

== United States ==
- Lake Manitou (Indiana) in Rochester, Indiana
- Lake Manitou on North Manitou Island in Michigan

== See also ==
- Manitou (disambiguation)
