= USS Manitou =

The US Navy has operated three vessels named Manitou, after the Algonquian term for a holy spirit.

- USS Fort Hindman, a steamship briefly named Manitou in 1863
- USS Worcester (1866), a Contoocook-class sloop laid down as Manitou
- USS Manito II, a patrol vessel which retained her civilian name
