= Gitche Manitou =

Algonquian deity

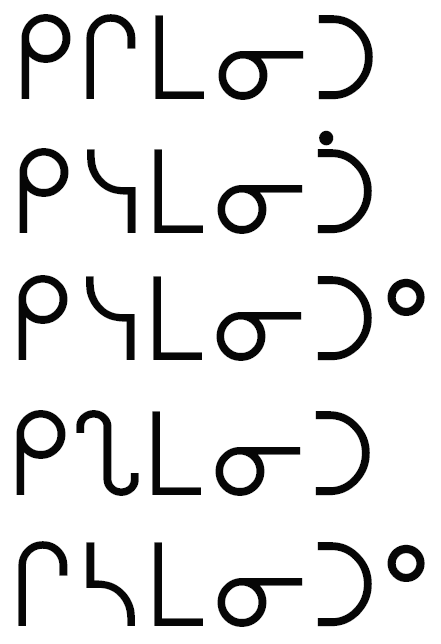
Gitche Manitou in Cree syllabic: Kihci-manitô (Cree New Testament 1876), Kise-manitô (Cree Bible 1862), Kise-manitow (Cree New Testament 1908), Gizhe-manidoo (Ojibwe New Testament 1988), Chisa-manitu (Naskapi New Testament 2007)

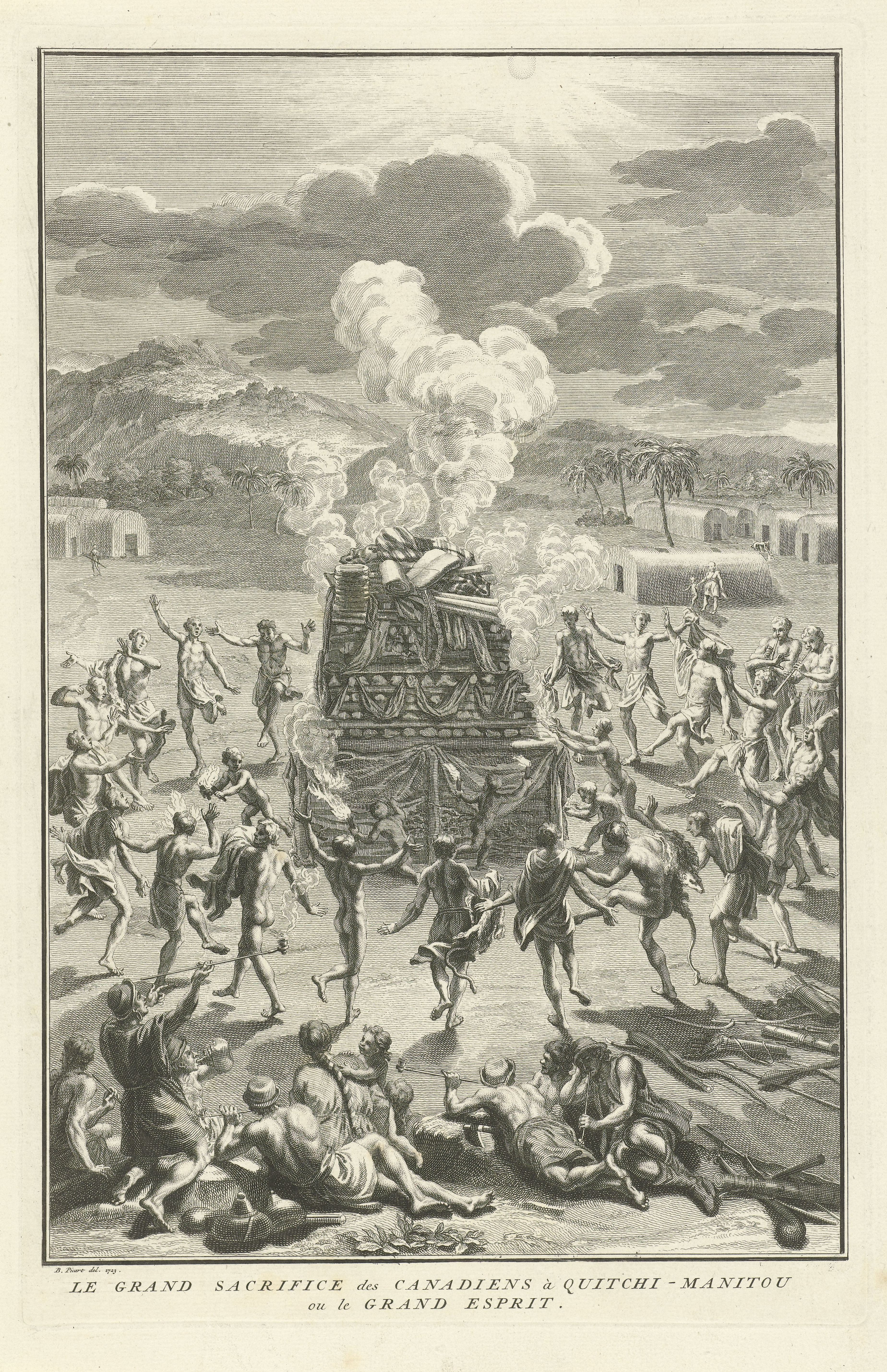
Dutch engraving (Bernard Picart, 1723) showing a sacrificial ceremony dedicated to "Quitchi-Manitou"

Gitche Manitou (Gitchi Manitou, Kitchi Manitou, etc.) means "Great Spirit" in several Algonquian languages. Gitche (Gizhe, Kitchi, or Kije) is directly defined as "grand" or "great" in Algonquian. The term typically refers to moral or spiritual greatness specifically, whereas the algonquian prefix "mang-" refers to the general quality of largeness (as in, "mangatemo" meaning, "wide road"). Manitou is a common Algonquian term for spirit, mystery, or deity.

Christian missionaries have translated God as Gitche Manitou in scriptures and prayers in the Algonquian languages. Native American Churches in Mexico, the United States and Canada often use this term.

== Anishinaabemowin ==
In more recent Anishinaabe culture, the Anishinaabe language word Gichi-manidoo means Great Spirit, the Creator of all things and the Giver of Life, and is sometimes translated as the "Great Mystery". Historically, Anishinaabe people believed in a variety of spirits, whose images were placed near doorways for protection.

According to Anishinaabeg tradition, Michilimackinac, later named by European settlers as Mackinac Island, in Michigan, was the home of Gitche Manitou, and some Anishinaabeg tribes would make pilgrimages there for rituals devoted to the spirit.

In Henry Wadsworth Longfellow's The Song of Hiawatha, Gitche Manitou is spelled Gitche Manito.

Other Anishinaabe names for God incorporated through the process of syncretism are Gizhe-manidoo ("venerable Manidoo"), Wenizhishid-manidoo ("Fair Manidoo") and Gichi-ojichaag ("Great Spirit"). While Gichi-manidoo and Gichi-ojichaag both mean "Great Spirit", Gichi-manidoo carried the idea of the greater spiritual connectivity while Gichi-ojichaag carried the idea of individual soul's connection to the Gichi-manidoo.

== Other tribes ==
In addition to the Algonquian Anishinaabeg, many other tribes believed in Gitche Manitou. References to the Great Manitou by the Cheyenne and the Oglala Sioux (notably in the recollections of Black Elk), indicate that belief in this deity extended into the Great Plains, fully across the wider group of Algonquian peoples.

Cognate terms recorded in other Algonquian languages include:

Manitou

- Fox: Mannittoo, God
- Narragensett: Manitoo, God

Gitche Manitou

- Ojibwe: Gichi-manidoo
- Ottawa: Gchi-mnidoo
- Swampy Cree: Kihci-manitô
- Miami: Kihci Manetoowa
- Lenape:
  - Munsee: Kitschimanitto
- Nanticoke (spoken in Maryland): Gichtschi Manitto

Kishe Manitou

- Ojibwe: Gizhe-manidoo
- Ottawa: Gzhe-mnidoo
- Swampy Cree: Kise-manitô
- Plains Cree: kisê-manitow
- Naskapi: Chisa-manitu
- Illinois: Kisseh Manetou

Other

- Lenape:
  - Unami: Ketanëtuwit (<ket- 'great'+(m)anətu 'spirit'+-wi-t 'the one who is'; the initial m- in manətu is elided in this compound)
- Narragansett: Cautantowwit; also known as Kytan
- Shawnee: Wishemenetou
- Lakota: Wakan Tanka (Wakȟáŋ Tȟáŋka); Wakan Tanka literally means “Great Mystery”

== Gitche Manitou within Algonquin Mythology ==
Manitou is the spiritual and fundamental life force among Algonquian groups in the Native American mythology. Manitou is one aspect of the interconnection and balance of nature and life, similar to the East Asian concept of qi. In simpler terms it can refer to a spirit. This spirit is seen as a person as well as a concept. Everything has its own manitou—every plant, every stone and, since their invention, even machines. These manitous do not exist in a hierarchy like European gods/goddesses, but are more akin to one part of the body interacting with another and the spirit of everything; the collective is named Gitche Manitou.

In many Algonquin tribes, Gitche Manitou is also seen as a benevolent, impersonal, abstract, and rarely personified Creator Deity. In this context, Gitche Manitou is considered a separate being independent of other manitous, and takes precedence among them. Prior to contact with Europeans, Gitche Manitou was not referred to with any specific gender, however, after contact, Gitche Manitou was often referred to as "he".

== Gitche Manitou within Christian Algonquin Usage ==
Early Christian (particularly French Jesuit) missionaries faced particular dilemmas in properly conveying the Christian theological concept of the Triune God within an indigenous framework. Consequently, they often used the term Gichi-ojichaag to refer to the Christian idea of the Holy Spirit, while reserving Gitche-Manitou to refer to God the Father. This can be seen, for example, in the English translation of the "Huron Carol".

== Related spirits ==
Spirits who were either aspects of Gitche Manitou or lesser spirits under Gitche Manitou include:

- Hobomok, who was deemed more approachable than Gitche Manitou, and more likely to listen to pleas, but who was also mischievous and interpreted by Englishmen as being the devil, or an evil deity.

== See also ==
- Ahone
- Manitoba
- Manitoulin Island
- Wakan Tanka
