= George H. Crosby Manitou State Park =

State park in Minnesota, United States

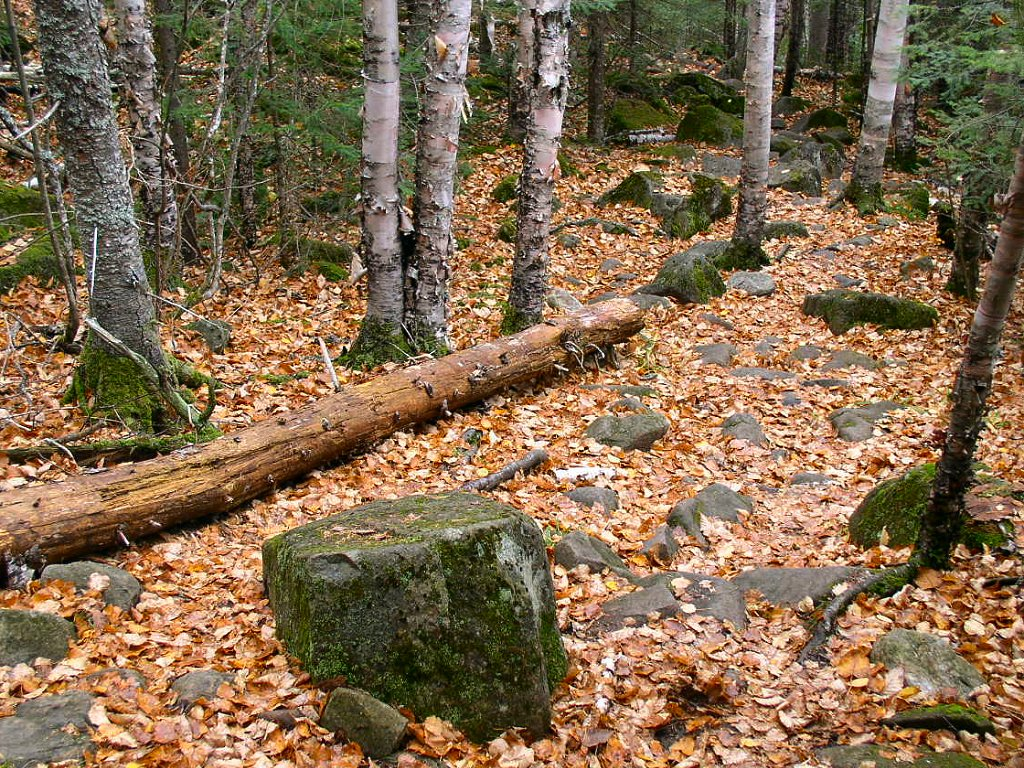
- Rugged backpacking trails traverse the inland North Shore Highlands

- Location within Minnesota Location within the United States
- Location: Lake, Minnesota, United States
- Coordinates: 47°28′44″N 91°6′43″W
- Area: 6,682 acres (27.04 km^{2})
- Elevation: 1,391 ft (424 m)
- Established: 1955
- Governing body: Minnesota Department of Natural Resources

George H. Crosby Manitou State Park is a state park of Minnesota, US, located between Tettegouche State Park and Temperance River State Park on the North Shore of Lake Superior, near the communities of Little Marais and Finland. It is situated on the Manitou River and was intentionally left largely undeveloped.

== History ==
The original 3,320 acres (13 km^{2}) of land on which this park sits were donated by George H. Crosby in 1955. The park was named both after Crosby and the river which it contains, the Manitou River. A decision was made to keep the park largely undeveloped, and thus it contains only backpacking campsites and not a traditional campground. It was the first backpacking campground in the state of Minnesota, and remains restricted to backpackers to this day.

== Wildlife ==
The park contains numerous wildlife species such as timber wolf, black bear, moose, peregrine falcon, golden eagle, raccoon, Canadian lynx, kestrel, snowshoe hare, beaver, bald eagle, white-tailed deer, hawk, fisher, marten, grouse, red squirrel, Canada jay, and species of bats.

== Landscape ==
Because it is undeveloped, Crosby Manitou State Park contains many undisturbed miles of fir, cedar, spruce, and northern hardwoods. The river itself has cataracts to the north of the park, and Bensen Lake sits across the southwest ridge of the river valley.
