= SS Jarvis Lord =

American wooden bulk freighter

Coordinates: 44°57′47″N 85°59′23″W

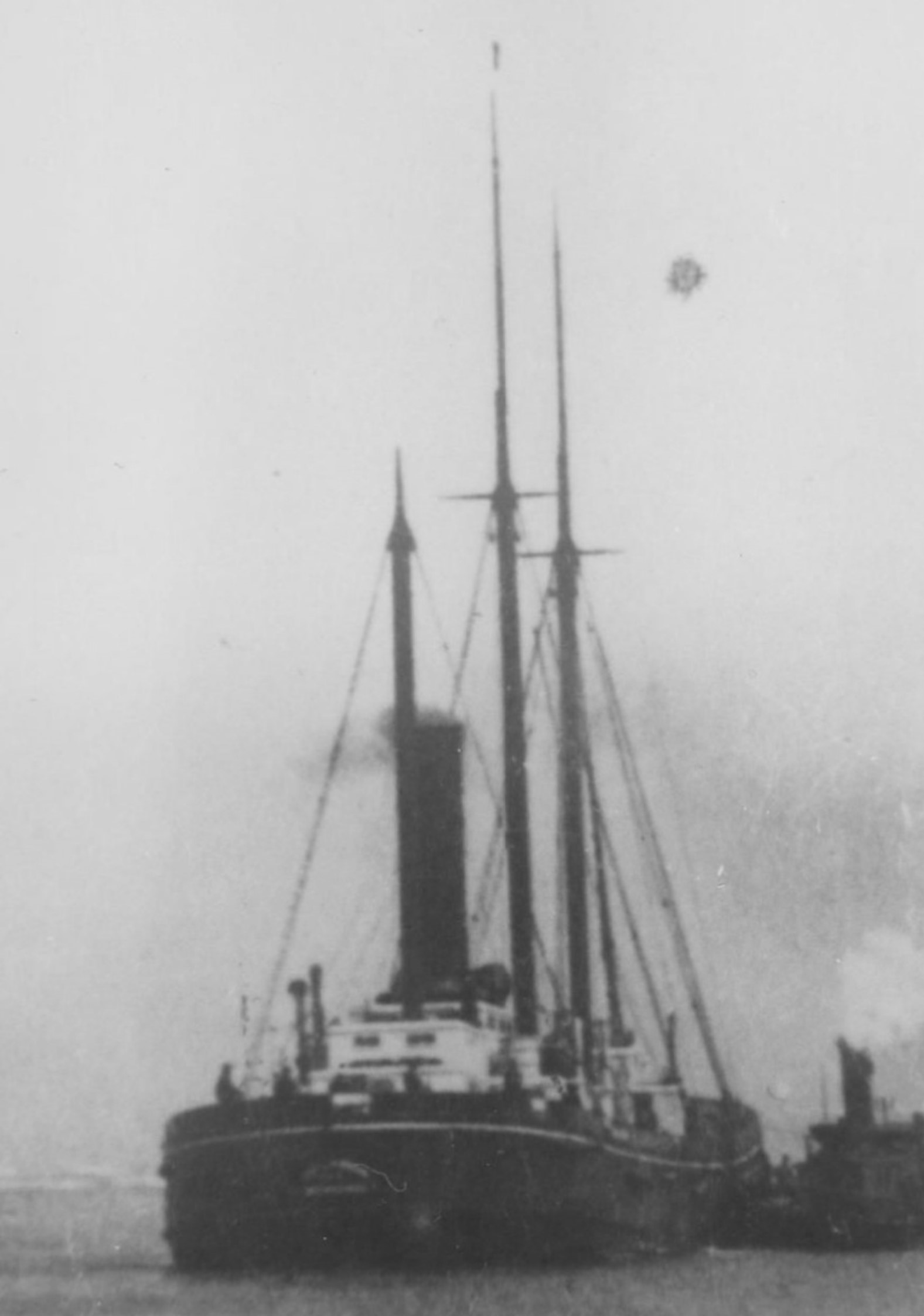
- Jarvis Lord at Point Edward, Ontario

History

United States
- Name: Jarvis Lord
- Namesake: Jarvis Lord
- Owner: John W. Moore & H.H. Brown
- Port of registry: Chicago, Illinois
- Builder: Morley & Hill of Marine City, Michigan
- Launched: November 23, 1872
- In service: May 19, 1873
- Out of service: August 17 or 18, 1885
- Identification: Registry number US 75499
- Fate: Sank in the Manitou Passage
- Wreck discovered: June 24, 2020

General characteristics
- Type: Lake freighter
- Tonnage: 770.97 GRT; 641.06 NRT
- Length: 178.3 ft (54.3 m)
- Beam: 32.6 ft (9.9 m)
- Depth: 18 ft (5.5 m)
- Installed power: Engine: 1 × 500 hp (370 kW) single-cylinder low pressure steam engine; Boiler: 1 × 40 psi (280 kPa) tubular boiler
- Propulsion: 1 × fixed pitch propeller
- Crew: 20

SS Jarvis Lord was a wooden-hulled American Great Lakes freighter in service between 1872 and 1885. She sank without loss of life in the Manitou Passage on Lake Michigan on August 17 or 18, 1885, while loaded with iron ore.

Jarvis Lord was one of the first bulk freighters ever built for the Great Lakes. She was built in 1872 by the Morley & Hill shipyard in Marine City, Michigan for William B. Morley, one of the yard's owners. One of the first purpose built lake freighters, Jarvis Lord was designed to operate in the iron-ore and coal trade. She would end up changing hands twice during the 1870s, before being purchased by John W. Moore & H.H. Brown of Cleveland, Ohio in 1883.

On August 17 or 18, 1885, while bound from St. Ignace, Michigan for Chicago, Illinois, Jarvis Lord was travelling in the Manitou Passage when she sprang a leak and began sinking rapidly. Captain Richard Neville ordered that the pumps be turned on, and that Jarvis Lord be steered towards Pyramid Point in order to beach her. The situation became so dire Captain Neville ordered that the crew abandon ship. She sank stern first. All of her crew survived, making it to Glen Haven, Michigan about an hour later.

The wreck of Jarvis Lord was discovered in 2020 by Ross Richardson, resting in 220 feet (67 m) of water and partially broken up. Richardson speculated that Jarvis Lord sank due to a possible grounding in the North Manitou Shoal.

== History ==
=== Design and construction ===
Jarvis Lord (US official number 75499) was built in 1872 in Marine City, Michigan, by the Morley & Hill shipyard. Her master carpenter was William B. Morley, one of the yard's owners. She was launched on November 23, 1872. At the time of her construction, Jarvis Lord was the largest double-decked steamship ever built in Marine City, and one of the first purpose-built bulk freighters ever built for the Great Lakes (lake freighter). Jarvis Lord's wooden hull was 178.3 feet (54.3 m) in length, 32.6 feet (9.9 m) wide and 18 feet (5.5 m) deep. Jarvis Lord had a gross register tonnage of 770.97 tons and a net register tonnage of 641.06 tons.

Jarvis Lord was powered by a 500 hp (370 kW) single-cylinder low pressure steam engine; the cylinder of the engine had a bore of 42 inches (110 cm) and a stroke of 32 inches (81 cm). Steam for the engine was produced by a coal-burning 9.5-by-16-foot (2.9 m × 4.9 m) 40 psi (280 kPa) tubular boiler. The engine was manufactured by Desotelle & Hutton of Detroit, Michigan. She was propelled by a single fixed-pitch propeller.

=== Service history ===
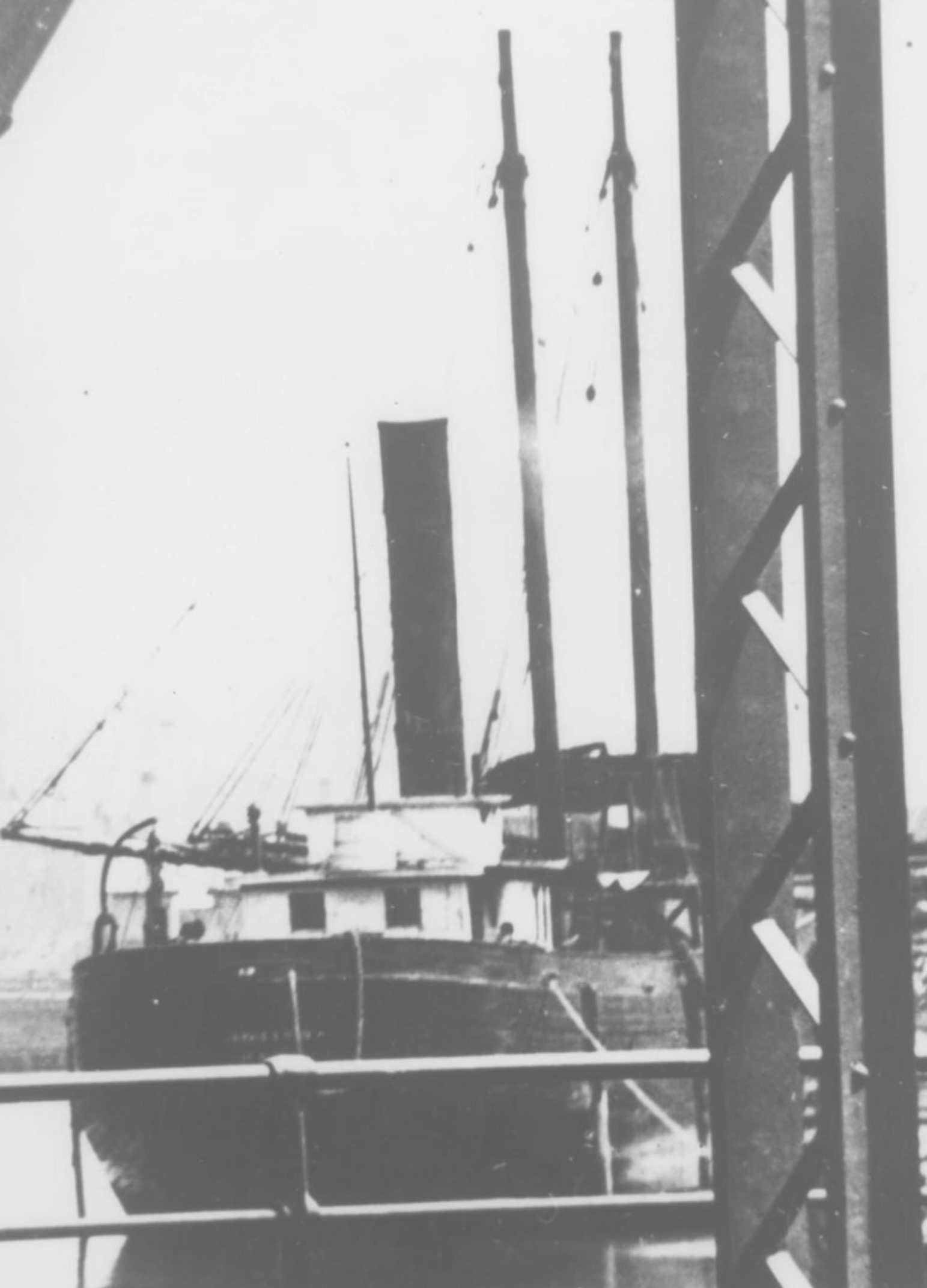
Jarvis Lord in Milwaukee, Wisconsin

Jarvis Lord was named after a politician and banker from New York, who was then a member of the New York State Senate. She was originally built for her master carpenter, William B. Morley, and was designed to operate in the iron ore and coal trade. She received her enrollment in Port Huron, Michigan on May 19, 1873. Her home port was Chicago, Illinois.

Throughout her career, Jarvis Lord was involved in many notable incidents and accidents.

On June 1, while loaded with 27,800 bushels of wheat, Jarvis Lord became the first ship to arrive in Buffalo, New York from Duluth, Minnesota in 1873. In 1874, Jarvis Lord operated as part of Eber Brock Ward's Lake Superior Line, making eleven round trips to Lake Superior. While in the Chicago harbour on April 1, 1874, Jarvis Lord received $100 worth of damage to her hull. Jarvis Lord was in Sault Ste. Marie, Michigan in June 1874, when her engine broke down. She sustained $3,000 worth of damage. Jarvis Lord was sold to John H. Bartow of Buffalo on April 29, 1875. She was fitted with a new stem in September 1875, by the Union Dry Dock Company in Buffalo. On April 29, 1879, Jarvis Lord was purchased by Marcus M. Drake of Buffalo, who chartered her to the Wabash Line in 1880.

Jarvis Lord suffered the most serious accident of her career on November 19, 1880, while bound from Toledo, Ohio for Buffalo with 24,000 bushels of wheat and 10,000 bushels of corn, when she struck an obstruction about 1.5 miles (2.4 km) east of Turtle Island on Lake Erie. She began leaking so badly that Captain A.W. Drake was forced to run her aground on Turtle Island. On November 25, she was towed to Amherstburg, Ontario by the steamer Garland, going into winter layup immediately. On September 27, 1881, Jarvis Lord was blown ashore at Ile Parisienne on Lake Superior while loaded with 32,000 bushels of wheat. By 1882, Jarvis Lord was engaged in the Marquette, Michigan – Cleveland, Ohio iron ore trade. She was sold to John W. Moore and H.H. Brown of Cleveland in March 1883, for $28,000. In 1883, she towed the barge T.P. Sheldon. Jarvis Lord received a major overhaul in March 1885; she had new decks, beams, hatches and stringers installed. In May of that same year, Jarvis Lord towed the schooners Champion, G.P. King and Reindeer in the Milwaukee and Chicago grain trade. Jarvis Lord was damaged in a collision with the schooner E.P. Royce on July 23, 1885, off the Skilligalee Light.

=== Final voyage ===
On August 17 or 18, 1885, while under the command of Captain Richard Neville, Jarvis Lord left St. Ignace, Michigan with a load of iron ore destined for Chicago, Illinois. She was transiting the Manitou Passage, when she sprang a leak, probably from grounding out on a shoal. Captain Neville ordered that the pumps be turned on. However, the pumps could not keep up with the water pouring in, prompting Captain Neville to give the order to steer her towards Pyramid Point in order to beach her. Eventually, the rising water inside her hull extinguished the fire in her boiler. The situation got so dire that Captain Neville gave the order to launch the lifeboats. As her crew of 20 began to row away, Jarvis Lord sank stern first, with her deck breaking away from her hull. Her crew rowed to Glen Haven, Michigan, arriving there about an hour later. They travelled back to Chicago on the steamer Lawrence. About a week and a half after Jarvis Lord sank, a large piece of her deck was reported floating off Frankfort, Michigan. At the time of her loss, Jarvis Lord was valued at $32,000, and her hull had an Inland Lloyd's insurance rating of A2 ½.

== Wreck ==
=== Discovery ===
Underwater image of the wreck taken by Steven Wimer II

In the years following her sinking, multiple shipwreck hunters tried and failed to find Jarvis Lord's wreck. In the twenty-first century, shipwreck hunter Ross Richardson of Lake Ann, Michigan had aspirations of locating Jarvis Lord for a number of years. On May 31, 2019, Richardson located what appeared to be a shipwreck while scanning the bottom of the Manitou Passage. Scheduling conflicts prevented him from returning to the site immediately, but in November 2019, he began working with local television station WZZM to plan an exploration of the shipwreck the following year. On June 24, 2020, Richardson and fellow shipwreck hunters Cal Kothrade and Steve Wimer II from Milwaukee, Wisconsin joined a team from WZZM in Glen Haven, Michigan. Once they reached the wreck site, Wimer dove and captured footage of the wreck for review by the team. Based on the size and location, Richardson was able to identify the wreck as Jarvis Lord. Richardson shared the GPS coordinates of the wreck immediately after making the discovery public. He speculated that Jarvis Lord sank due to a possible grounding on the North Manitou Shoal.

=== Today ===
The wreck of Jarvis Lord rests in 220 feet (67 m) of water, 2.5 miles (4.0 km) west of Pyramid Point. Her wreck is split open at the bow and the stern. Her midsection remains partially intact, with the starboard side remaining upright and the port side having fallen away. Her boiler lies next to her wreck, indicating that she sank so quickly that the air-filled boiler remained buoyant and floated away from the hull. Her helm lies off to the starboard side. There is a debris field off to her port side, and a pile of iron ore to her starboard side.
