= SY Manitou =

1937 cruising yacht

Manitou
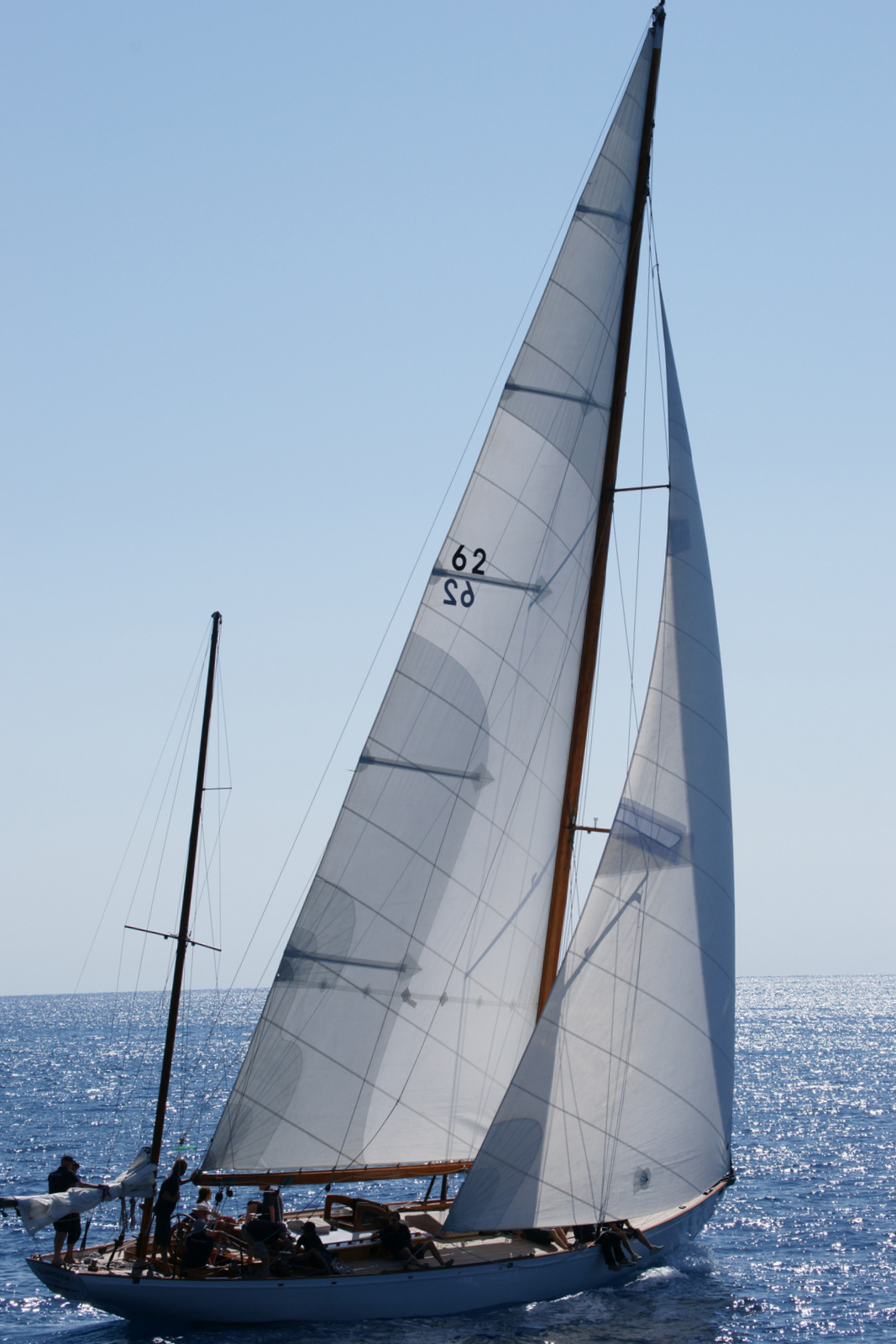
- Manitou in the 2012 "Les Régates de Nice"
- Sail no: 62
- Designer(s): Sparkman & Stephens
- Builder: M. M. Davis & Son
- Launched: 1937
- Owner(s): James Lowe (1937–c.1940); Coast Guard Academy (1955–1968); Harry Lundeberg School of Seamanship (1968–1999); Laura Kilbourne (1999-2010); Phil Jordan, Pat Tierney, Claes Goran Nilsson, and Melinda Kilkenny (2010-)

Racing career
- Notable victories: Chicago-Mackinac Cup - 1938

Specifications
- Type: Marconi-rigged yawl
- Displacement: 60,000 lb (27.2 tonnes)
- Length: 62 ft (18.9 m) LOA/LOD; 44 ft (13.4 m) LWL
- Beam: 13.8 ft (4.2 m)
- Draft: 8.6 ft (2.6 m)
- Mast height: 81 ft (25 m)
- Sail area: 1,778 sq ft (165 m^{2})
- Crew: 5-6

Notes
- Named for the Manitou Passage.; USCG Call sign: WSV8851

Manitou is a 62-foot-long (18.9 m) performance cruising yacht designed and built for racing on the Great Lakes and specifically to win the Chicago-Mackinac Race. It notably served as a presidential yacht for United States president John F. Kennedy and was known as the "Floating White House." Manitou was built in 1937 at the M. M. Davis & Son shipyard in Solomons Island, Maryland. It was Design No. 99 of naval architects Sparkman & Stephens, who built many America's Cup racing yachts.

Manitou was originally commissioned and privately owned by race car driver James Lowe. She was launched in 1937 and promptly won the 1938 Chicago-Mackinac Race in the cruising division (on corrected time), beating all previous records. She came a close second the next year. In 1940 and 1941, Manitou won the Port Huron to Mackinac Boat Race. After these successes, Lowe sold her, and in 1955 she was donated to the US Coast Guard to be used as a training vessel at the United States Coast Guard Academy in New London, Connecticut.

President Kennedy used Manitou while he was in office. Manitou was returned to private ownership in 1968 when she became a training vessel for the Harry Lundeberg School of Seamanship in Maryland. The boat took on the nickname: "Floating White House".

In 1999 Manitou was sold to Laura Kilbourne, granddaughter of James R. Lowe, the original owner. Manitou was then given a comprehensive refit at Deagle's Marine Railway in Deltaville, Virginia.

In late 2010 she was sold to four joint owners and underwent an extensive refit in early 2011. She was then shipped to the Mediterranean where she was raced extensively and made available for charter out of ports on the French Riviera.
