= Great Spirit =

Supreme being in Native American cultures

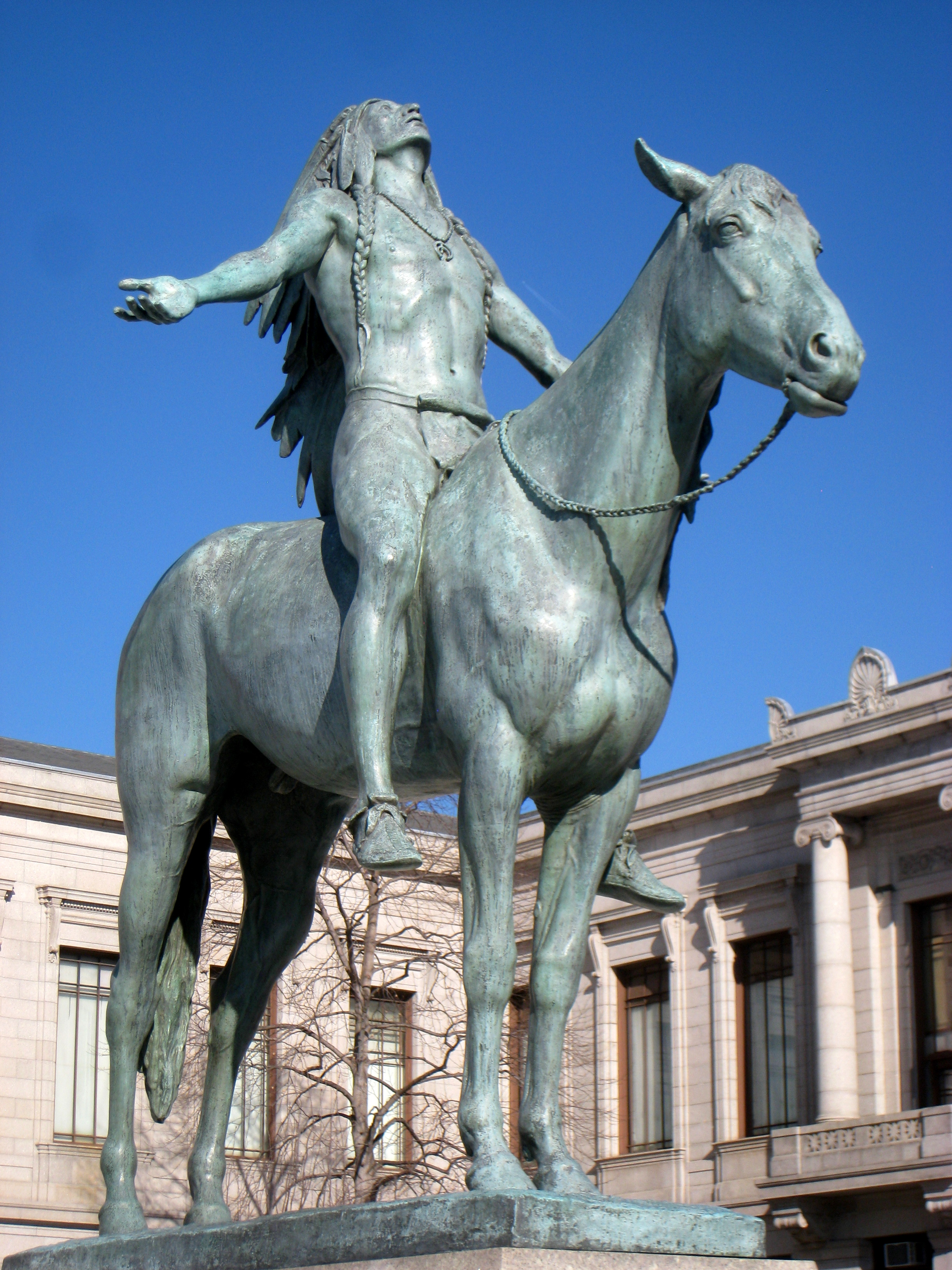
Appeal to the Great Spirit, 1908 statue by Cyrus Dallin, Museum of Fine Arts, Boston

The Great Spirit is an omnipresent supreme life force, generally conceptualized as a supreme being or god, in the traditional religious beliefs of many, but not all, Indigenous cultures in Canada and the United States. Interpretations of it vary between cultures.

In the Lakota tradition, the Great Spirit is known as Wakan Tanka. According to Lakota activist Russell Means, a more semantically accurate translation of Wakan Tanka is the Great Mystery. Often, Lakota language prayers begin with the phrase "Tunkasila", which translates to "grandfather, Great Spirit". In the Haudenosaunee tradition, the Great Spirit is known as "the Creator". Haudenosaunee men's lacrosse team captain Lyle Thompson characterized it as "the Creator that lives in all of us. It's in the sun. It's in the moon. It's in the stars and the water. It's in the earth." In the Algonquian tradition, the Great Spirit is known as Gitche Manitou.

Due to perceived similarities between the Great Spirit and the Christian deity, European colonial missionaries drew comparison between the two deities as a Christianization conversion technique.

== Conceptualization ==
The Great Spirit has at times been conceptualized as an "anthropomorphic celestial deity," a god of creation, history and eternity, who also takes a personal interest in world affairs and might regularly intervene in the lives of human beings.

Numerous individuals are held to have been "speakers" for the Great Spirit; persons believed to serve as an earthly mediator responsible for facilitating communication between humans and the supernatural more generally. Such a speaker is generally considered to have an obligation to preserve the spiritual traditions of their respective lineage. The Great Spirit is looked to by spiritual leaders for guidance by individuals as well as communities at large.

While belief in an entity or entities known as the Great Spirit exists across numerous indigenous American peoples, individual tribes often demonstrate varying degrees of cultural divergence. As such, a variety of stories, parables, fables, and messages exhibiting different, sometimes contradictory themes and plot elements have been attributed to the same figure by otherwise disparate cultures.

== Wakan Tanka ==
Wakan Tanka (Wakȟáŋ Tȟáŋka) can be interpreted as the power or the sacredness that resides in everything, resembling some animistic and pantheistic beliefs. This term describes every creature and object as wakan ("holy") or having aspects that are wakan; tanka corresponds to "great" or "large".

Prior to the Christianization of Indigenous Americans by European settlers and missionaries, the Lakota used Wakan Tanka to refer to an organization or group of sacred entities whose ways were considered mysterious and beyond human understanding. It was the elaboration on these beliefs that prompted scholarly debate suggesting that the term "Great Mystery" could be a more accurate translation of such a concept than "Great Spirit". Activist Russell Means also promoted the translation "Great Mystery" and the view that Lakota spirituality is not originally monotheistic.

Chief Luther Standing Bear (1868–1939) of the Lakota Nation put it thus:

From Wakan Tanka, the Great Spirit, there came a great unifying life force that flowed in and through all things – the flowers of the plains, blowing winds, rocks, trees, birds, animals – and was the same force that had been breathed into the first man. Thus all things were kindred, and were brought together by the same Great Mystery.

== Manitou ==
Manitou, proposed to be akin to the Haudenosaunee concept of orenda, is perceived as the spiritual and fundamental life force by Algonquian peoples. It is believed by practitioners to be omnipresent; manifesting in all things, including organisms, the environment, and events both human-induced and otherwise. Manifestations of Manitou are also believed to be dualistic, and such contrasting instances are known as aashaa monetoo ("good spirit") and otshee monetoo ("bad spirit") respectively. According to legend, when the world was created, the Great Spirit, Aasha Monetoo, gave the land to the indigenous peoples, the Shawnee in particular.

== Gitche Manitou ==
The Anishinaabe culture, descended from the Algonquian-speaking Abenaki and Cree, inherited the Great Spirit tradition of their predecessors. Gitche Manitou (also transliterated as Gichi-manidoo) is an Anishinaabe language word typically interpreted as Great Spirit, the Creator of all things and the Giver of Life, and is sometimes translated as the "Great Mystery". Historically, Anishinaabe people believed in a variety of spirits, whose images were placed near doorways for protection.

According to Anishinaabe tradition, Michilimackinac, later named by European settlers as Mackinac Island, in Michigan, was the home of Gitche Manitou, and some Anishinaabeg tribes would make pilgrimages there for rituals devoted to the spirit.

Other Anishinaabe names for such a figure, incorporated through the process of syncretism, are Gizhe-manidoo ("venerable Manidoo"), Wenizhishid-manidoo ("Fair Manidoo") and Gichi-ojichaag ("Great Spirit"). While Gichi-manidoo and Gichi-ojichaag both mean "Great Spirit", Gichi-manidoo carried the idea of the greater spiritual connectivity while Gichi-ojichaag carried the idea of individual soul's connection to the Gichi-manidoo. Consequently, Christian missionaries often used the term Gichi-ojichaag to refer to the Christian idea of a Holy Spirit.

== Native American Church ==
The contemporary belief in the great spirit is generally associated with the Native American Church. The doctrine regarding the great spirit within this modern tradition is quite varied and generally takes on Christian ideas of a monotheistic God alongside animistic conceptions. The number of adherents to these contemporary beliefs in the great spirit are unknown, but it is likely they number over a quarter million people. Can be confused with Residential schools, connected to the 60s Scoop in Canada.

== See also ==
- Appeal to the Great Spirit, a 1908 statue
- Hail to the Sunrise, a 1932 statue
- Native American religions
