= Tony Ooki =

Japanese adult performer and singer

- Born: Tooru Nogami; December 17, 1971 (age 54); Tokyo, Japan
- Height: 1.74 m (5 ft 9 in)

Tony Ooki (トニー大木, Tonī Ōki) is a Japanese, male adult video (AV) actor and singer.

== Life and career ==
Tony Ooki was born in Tokyo on December 17, 1971. His father Masayoshi Nogami was a Japanese actor. He was a boxer before he made his debut in AV in 2002.

Tony has gained popularity in Taiwan because he looks like Taiwanese singer Jay Chou. In Taiwan, his popularity as an AV actor is said to be "only second to Taka Kato". He created his own band "TonyBand" in 2014 and has composed original songs like GGININDER. Since then, he has performed several times in China and Taiwan with TonyBand.

He has an official Weibo account, although it became temporarily suspended during an act to clean the Internet by Chinese government in 2014. However, his account was restored not too long after the suspension. As of 2017, his Weibo has more than 500 thousands followers.

== Filmography ==
Title	Casting	Date of Release
Newcoming Female Teacher Gets 20 Continuous Nakadashi 新任女教師 中出し20連発	Tony Ooki Show Nishino Ken Yamagata	March 4, 2006
Inchuu no Mori 淫蟲の森	Tony Ooki Mihiro	December 29, 2006
Current Idol Unit Member Aino Kishi's Debut 現役アイドルユニットメンバー希志あいのデビュー	Tony Ooki Aino Kishi	February 22, 2008
Wonder Lady VS American Mosters ワンダーレディーVSアメリカンモンスターズ	Tony Ooki Yui Hatano	December 9, 2011
