= Manitou River (Minnesota) =

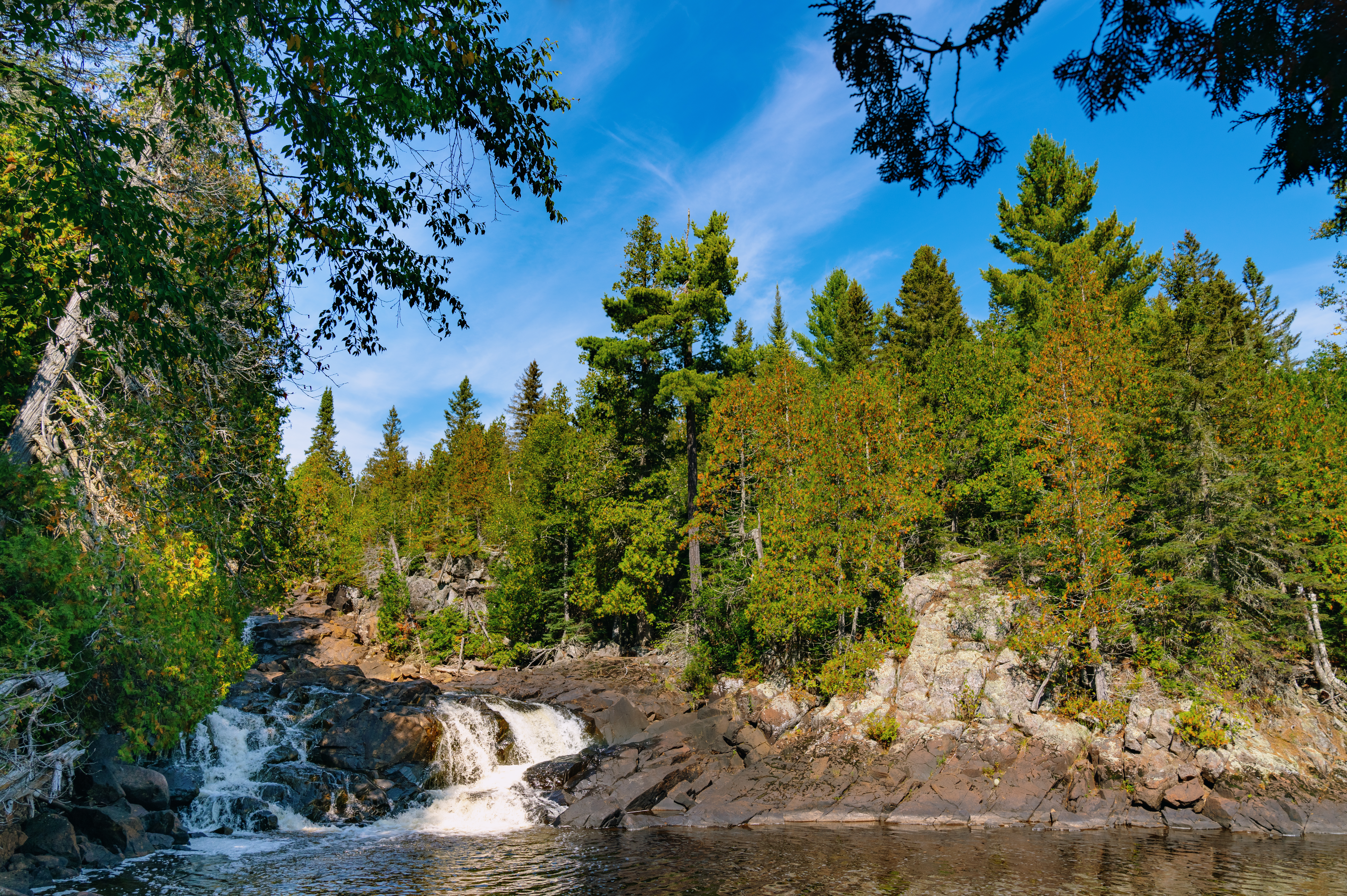
- A waterfall on the Manitou River

Location
- Country: United States
- State: Minnesota
- County: Lake County

Physical characteristics
- Source
  - location: Delay Lake, east of Isabella, Minnesota
  - coordinates: 47.6062959°N 91.291816°W
  - elevation: 1,953 feet (595 m)
- Mouth
  - location: Lake Superior
  - coordinates: 47.4427°N 91.0640°W
  - elevation: 602 feet (183 m)
- Length: 24.9-mile-long (40.1 km)

Basin features
- Tributaries
  - left: Nine Mile Creek, Moose Creek
  - right: Rock Cut Creek, South Branch Manitou River, Balsam Creek
- Waterfalls: Manitou River Cascades

The Manitou River is a 24.9-mile-long (40.1 km) river in northern Minnesota, which drains into Lake Superior along its north shore about three miles northeast of Little Marais. It flows southeast through the Superior National Forest, Finland State Forest, and George H. Crosby Manitou State Park in Lake County.

The Caribou River watershed is adjacent to the east, while to the west is the Baptism River. The Isabella River, which is a part of the Hudson Bay watershed, is to the north across the Laurentian Divide.

The Superior Hiking Trail crosses the Manitou River within George H. Crosby Manitou State Park.

The Manitou River contains rainbow trout and brook trout.

== See also ==
- List of rivers of Minnesota
