= Manitou =

Fundamental life force in Algonquian mythologies in North America

The word manitō (in both Cree and Ojibwe) written in Canadian Aboriginal Syllabics and Cree syllabics

Manitou (/ˈmænɪtuː/) is the fundamental life force in the theologies of Algonquian peoples. It is said to be omnipresent and manifests everywhere: organisms, the environment, events, etc.

== Overview ==
The word Manitou was widely used during early European contact. In 1585, when Thomas Harriot recorded the first glossary of an Algonquian language, Roanoke (Pamlico), he included the word mantóac, meaning "gods and goddesses". Similar terms are found in nearly all Algonquian languages.

In some Algonquian traditions, Gitche Manitou refers to a supreme being. The term has analogues dating to before European contact, and the word uses of gitche and manitou existed before contact. After contact, however, Gitche Manitou was adopted by some Anishinaabe, such as the Ojibwe, to refer to the supreme being. Algonquian religion acknowledges medicine healers, who used manitou to see the future, change the weather, and heal illness. Ojibwe medicine healers were primarily healers who used their spiritual connection to cure patients since illness was then believed to be caused by magic and spirits. To communicate with spirits and manipulate manitou, a healer would enter a trance, induced by singing, dancing, drumbeats, or the use of hallucinogens. Non-healers could also interact with spirits by embarking upon a "vision quest", using prayer, fasting, hallucinogens, and removing themselves from the society of others. A person who underwent vision quests would be visited by an "animal, voice, or object", which would become their guardian spirit.

== Place names ==
Manitou has entered the names of several places in North America. The name of Lake Manitoba (for which the Canadian province of Manitoba is named) derives from the area called manitou-wapow, or "strait of the Manitou" in Cree or Ojibwe, referring to the strange sound of waves crashing against rocks near the Narrows of the lake. Manitoba is also home to Whiteshell Provincial Park's petroforms, symbols made from rocks, which serve as reminders of the instructions given to the Anishinaabe by the Creator. The Anishinaabe Midewiwin, or Grand Medicine Society, considers the area containing the petroforms to be Manito Ahbee, where the Creator sits. It is the site where the Creator lowered the original Anishinaabe from the sky to the ground.

Manitoulin Island, called mnidoo mnis, or "island of the Great Spirit", by the Odawa, is very important to the Ojibwe, or Anishinaabe, because of its many sacred sites and sounding rocks. Native peoples continue to dwell on the island, which hosts several reserves.

Sleeping Bear Dunes National Lakeshore, on Lake Michigan's eastern coastline in the state of Michigan, includes two sites known as North and South Manitou Islands.

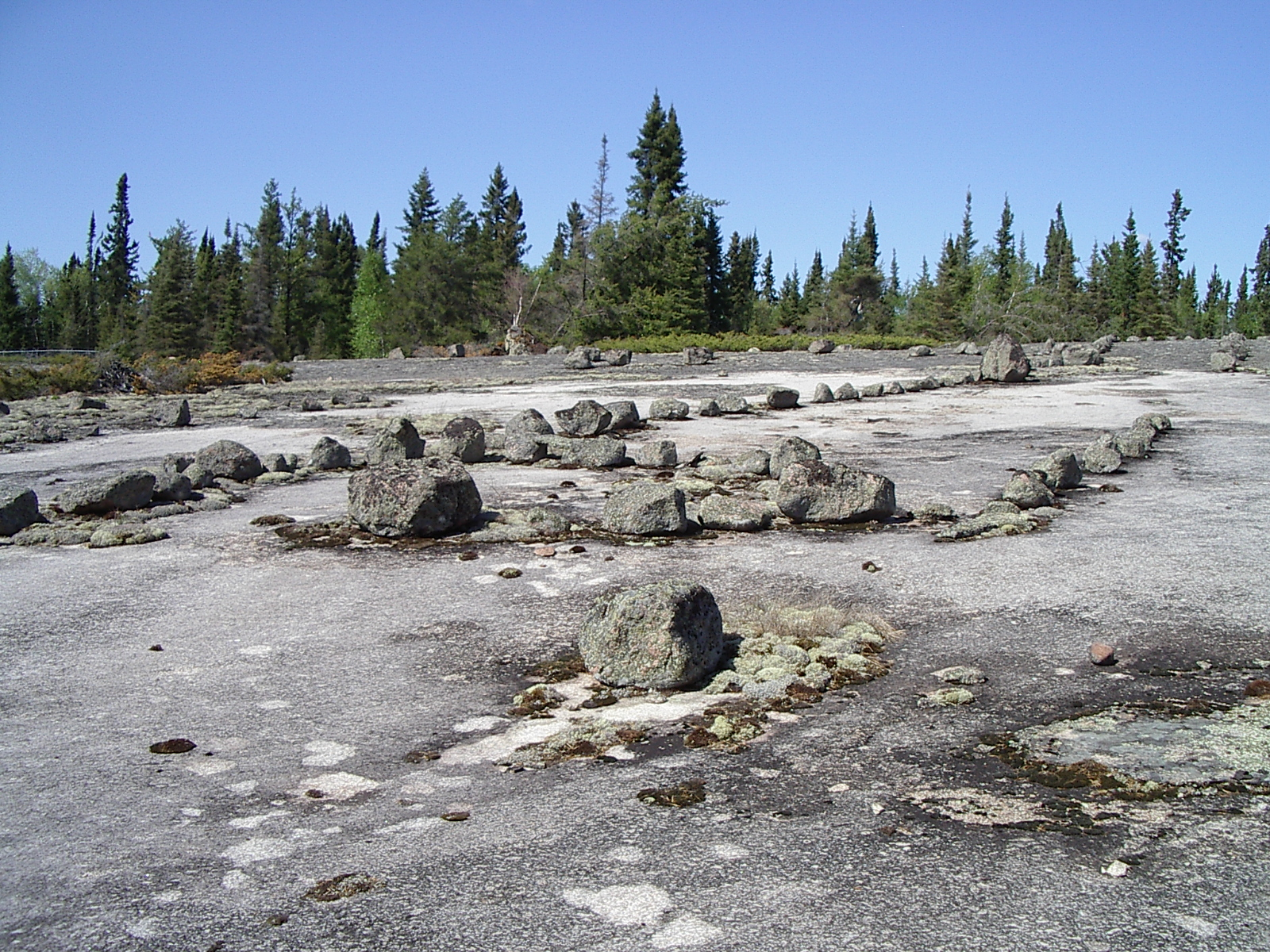
Petroforms in Whiteshell Provincial Park

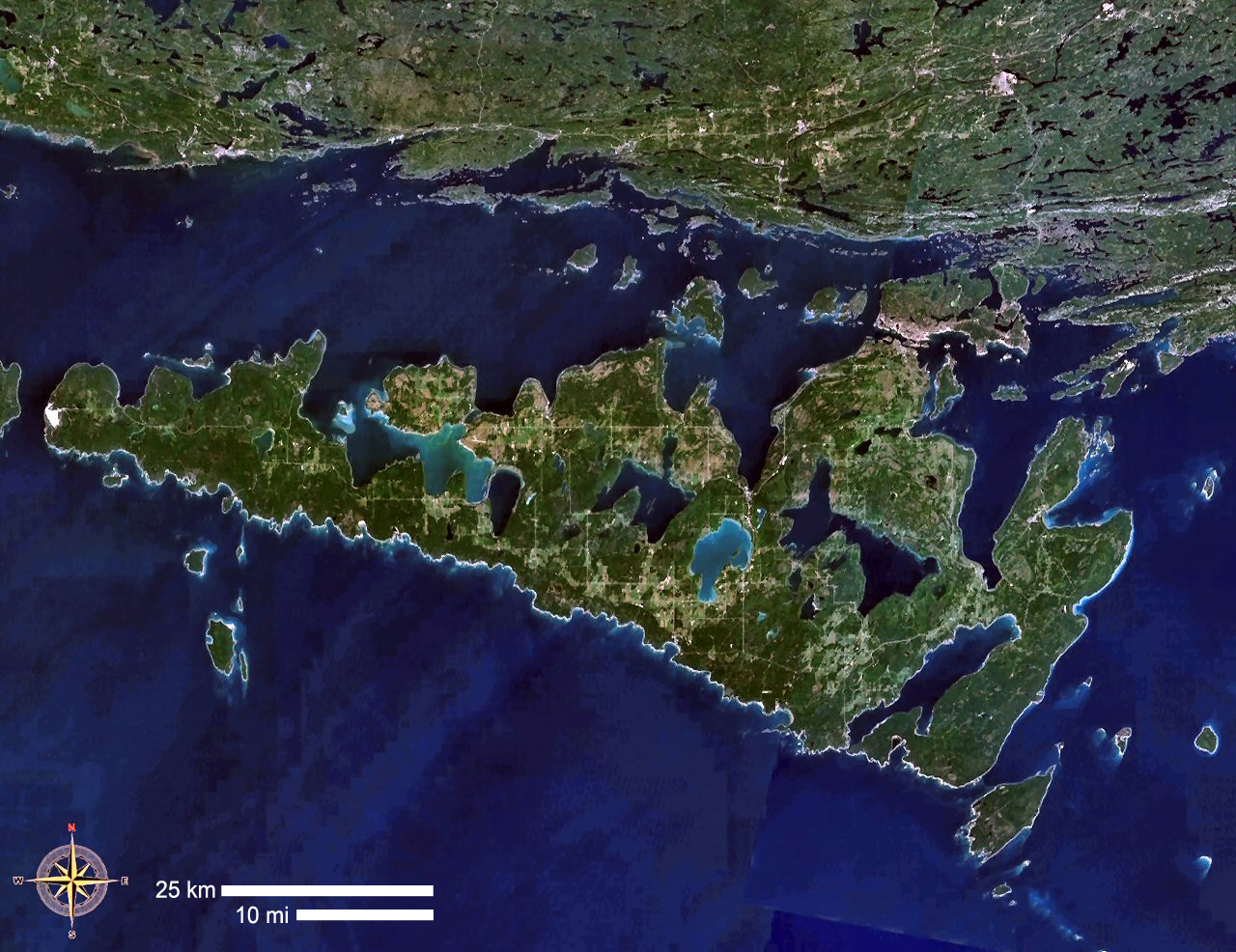
Manitoulin Island

== See also ==
- Animism
- Big Manitou Falls
- Catskill Escarpment, also known as the Wall of Manitou
- Cautantowwit
- Lake Manitou (Indiana)
- Little Manitou Lake
- Manitoba, Canada
- Manitou, Manitoba
- Manitou Springs, Colorado
- Manitouwadge
- Manitowoc, Wisconsin
- Manitou Island
- Minetta Creek
- Moniteau County, Missouri
- Manito, Illinois
- Manitou (Metro-North station)
- Manitou River (Minnesota)
- Orenda
