= Little Marais, Minnesota =

Unincorporated community in Minnesota, United States

- Unincorporated community
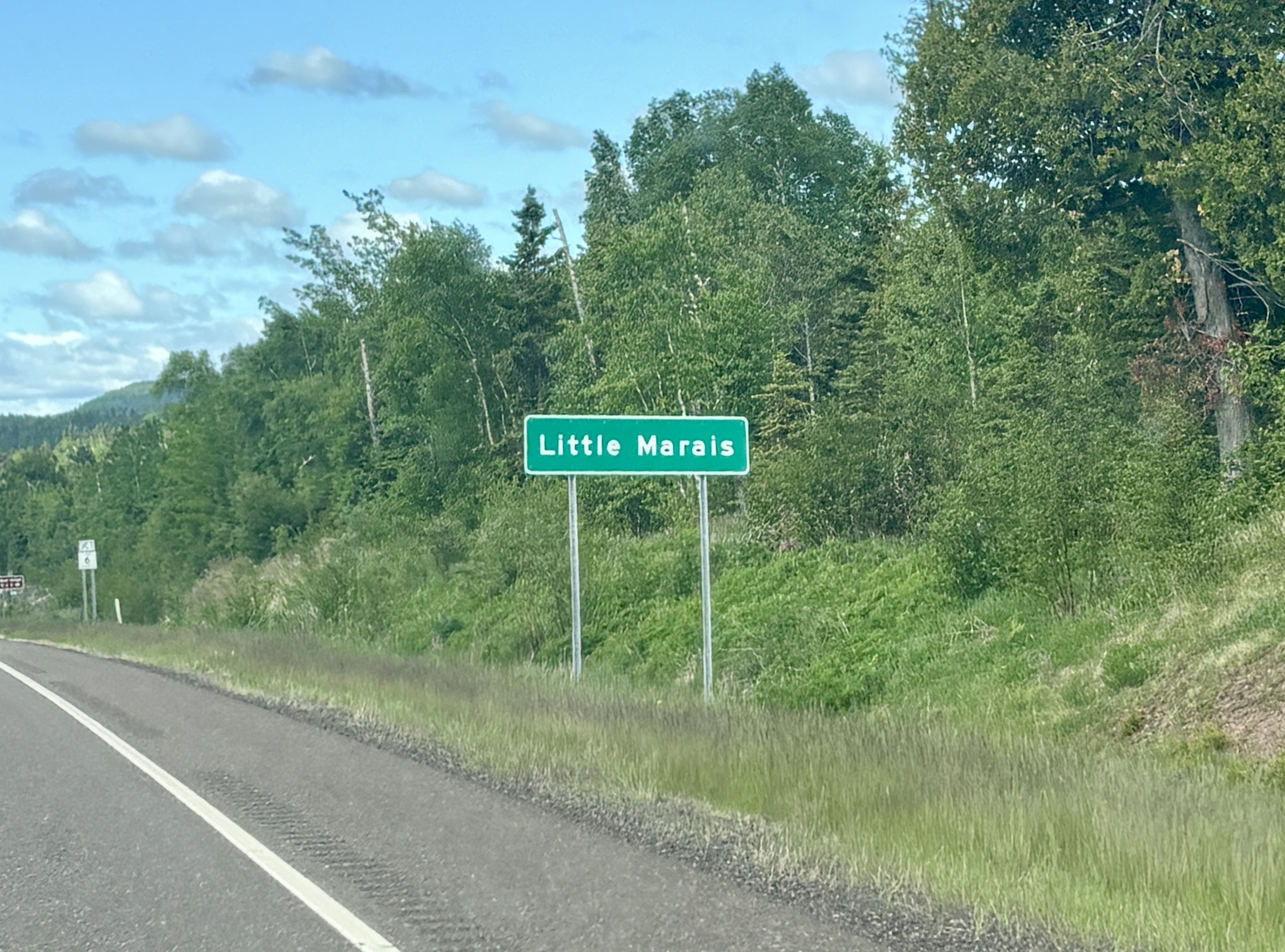
- Road sign on Hwy 61

- Location within Minnesota Location within the United States
- Coordinates: 47°24′39″N 91°06′37″W
- Country: United States
- State: Minnesota
- County: Lake
- Elevation: 640 ft (200 m)

Population
  - Total: 30
- Time zone: UTC-6 (Central (CST))
  - Summer (DST): UTC-5 (CDT)
- ZIP code: 55614
- Area code: 218
- GNIS feature ID: 646849

Little Marais is an unincorporated community in Lake County, Minnesota, United States; located on the North Shore of Lake Superior.

The community is located northeast of Silver Bay at the intersection of Minnesota Highway 61 and Lake County Road 6 (Little Marais Road).

Little Marais is located 39 miles northeast of the city of Two Harbors; and 44 miles southwest of the city of Grand Marais.

The community was originally known as Philips Trading Post.

Wolf Ridge Environmental Learning Center is nearby. The boundary line between Cook and Lake counties is also nearby.

Little Marais is located within Lake No. 1 Unorganized Territory of Lake County.

== History ==
A post office called Little Marais was established in 1905, and remained in operation until 1964. Little Marais is a name derived from French meaning "little marsh" Some say it means in Pigeon French "little harbor".
