= USS Manito II =

Patrol vessel of the United States Navy

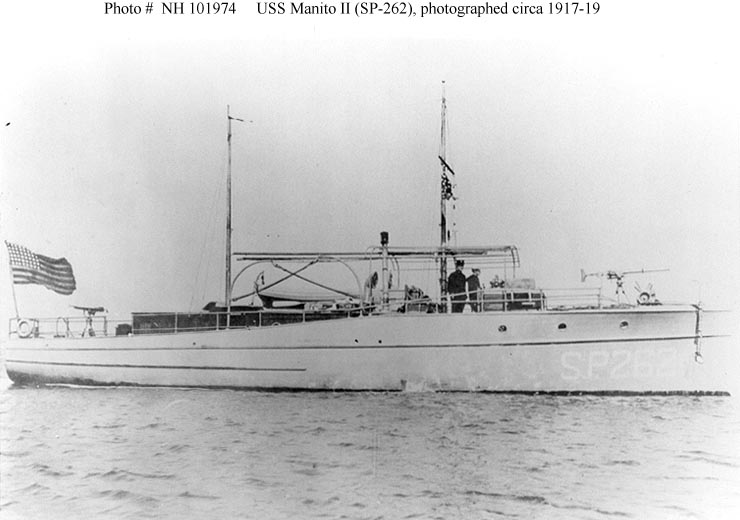
- USS Manito II sometime between 1917 and 1919.

History

United States
- Name: USS Manito II
- Namesake: Previous name retained
- Builder: Hudson Yacht and Boat Company, Nyack, New York
- Completed: 1912
- Acquired: 10 May 1917
- Commissioned: 10 May 1917
- Fate: Sold 25 March 1920
- Notes: Operated as civilian yacht Manito II 1912-1917

General characteristics
- Type: Patrol vessel
- Tonnage: 23 tons
- Length: 56 ft (17 m)
- Beam: 12 ft 8 in (3.86 m)
- Draft: 4 ft 6 in (1.37 m)
- Speed: 9.5 knots
- Complement: 10
- Armament: 1 × 1-pounder gun; 1 × machine gun

USS Manito II (SP-262) was a United States Navy patrol vessel in commission from 1917 to ca. 1919.

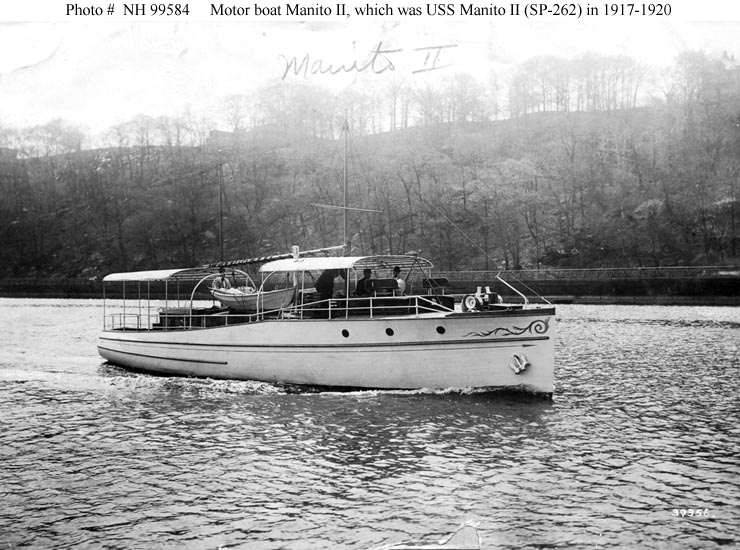
Manito II as a civilian yacht sometime between 1912 and 1917, prior to her U.S. Navy service.

Manito II was built as a civilian wooden-hulled motor yacht of the same name in 1912 by the Hudson Yacht and Boat Company at Nyack, New York. The U.S. Navy purchased her from her owner, Mr. I. K. Keyward, on 10 May 1917 for World War I service as a patrol vessel. She was commissioned the same day as USS Manito II (SP-262).

Assigned to the 6th Naval District, Manito II operated on section patrol based at Charleston, South Carolina, for the rest of World War I.

Manito II was sold on 25 March 1920.
