= Cautantowwit =

Creator god of Narragansett people

Cautantowwit (also known as Kytan) is the chief deity and creator god in the traditional religion of the Narragansett people. Cautantowwit was one of a pantheon of deities observed by the Narragansett, though all were ultimately created by him.

According to the Narragansett, Cautantowwit lived in "the southwest". They attributed the "Indian summer" to a wind that came from "the court of their great and benevolent god Cautantowwit".
