= Manitou Passage =

Navigable Lake Michigan waterway

Coordinates: 44°59′18″N 85°58′26″W

Manitou Passage is a navigable Lake Michigan waterway separating North and South Manitou Island from mainland Michigan. The passage—used by deep-draft lake freighters—is located in Leelanau County and is within the Manitou Passage Underwater Preserve.

John F. Kennedy's president yacht S/Y Manitou was named after Manitou Passage.
