= Okinoshima, Shimane =

Okinoshima 隠岐の島町
- Town
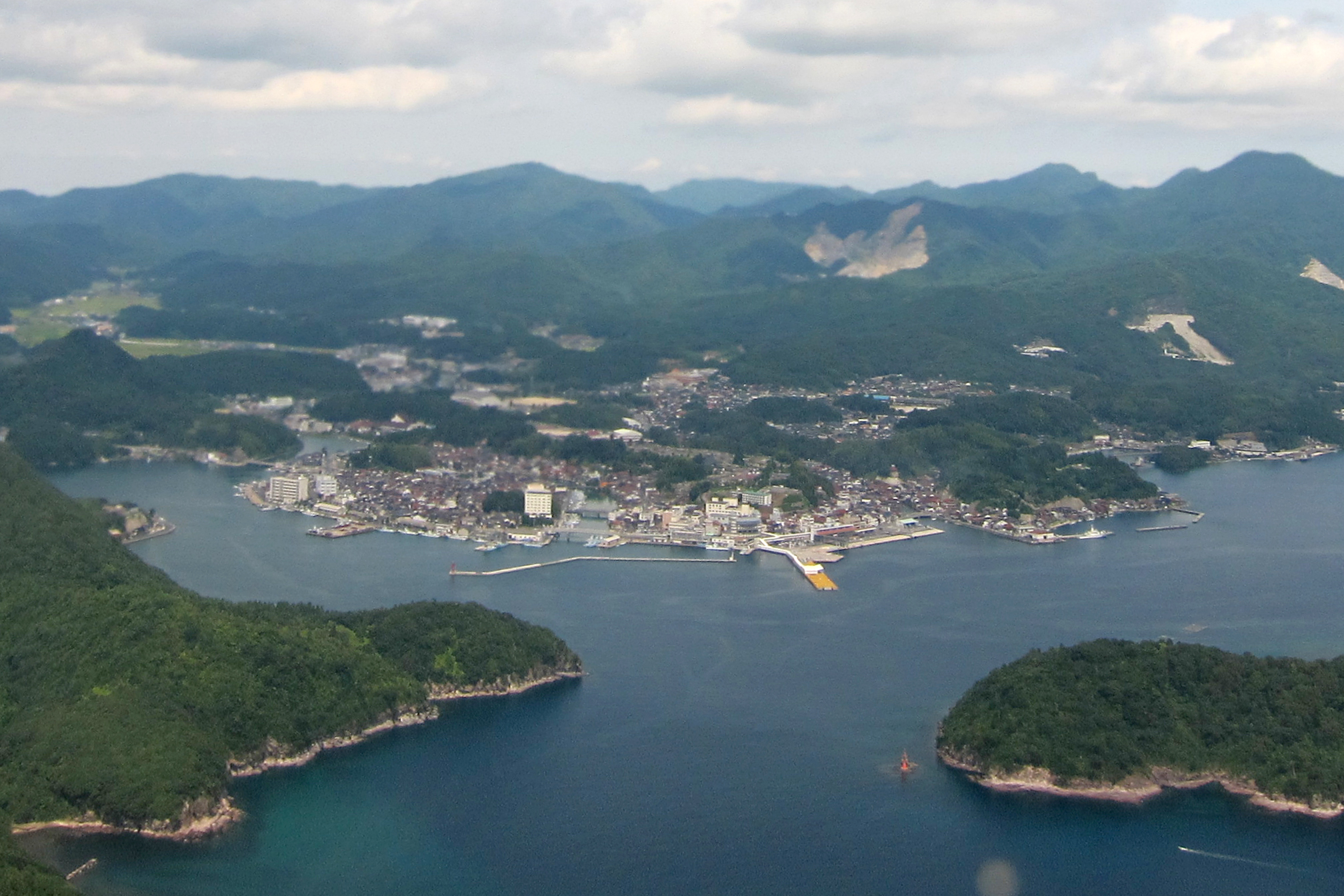
- Downtown of Okinoshima as seen from the SE.

- Flag Emblem

- Location of Okinoshima in Shimane Prefecture

- Okinoshima (Shimane Prefecture)
- Coordinates: 36°12′N 133°19′E
- Country: Japan
- Region: Chūgoku; San'in
- Prefecture: Shimane Prefecture
- District: Oki

Government
  - Mayor: Kōsei Ikeda

Area
  - Total: 242.97 km^{2} (93.81 sq mi)

Population (March 1, 2017)
  - Total: 14,422
  - Density: 61.1/km^{2} (158/sq mi)
- Time zone: UTC+9 (Japan Standard Time)
- Phone number: 08512-2-2111
- Address: 1 Jōhokumachi, Okinoshima-machi, Oki-gun, Shimane-ken 685-8585
- Climate: Cfa
- Website: www.town.okinoshima.shimane.jp
- Symbols
- Flower: Oki Rhododendron
- Tree: Cryptomeria

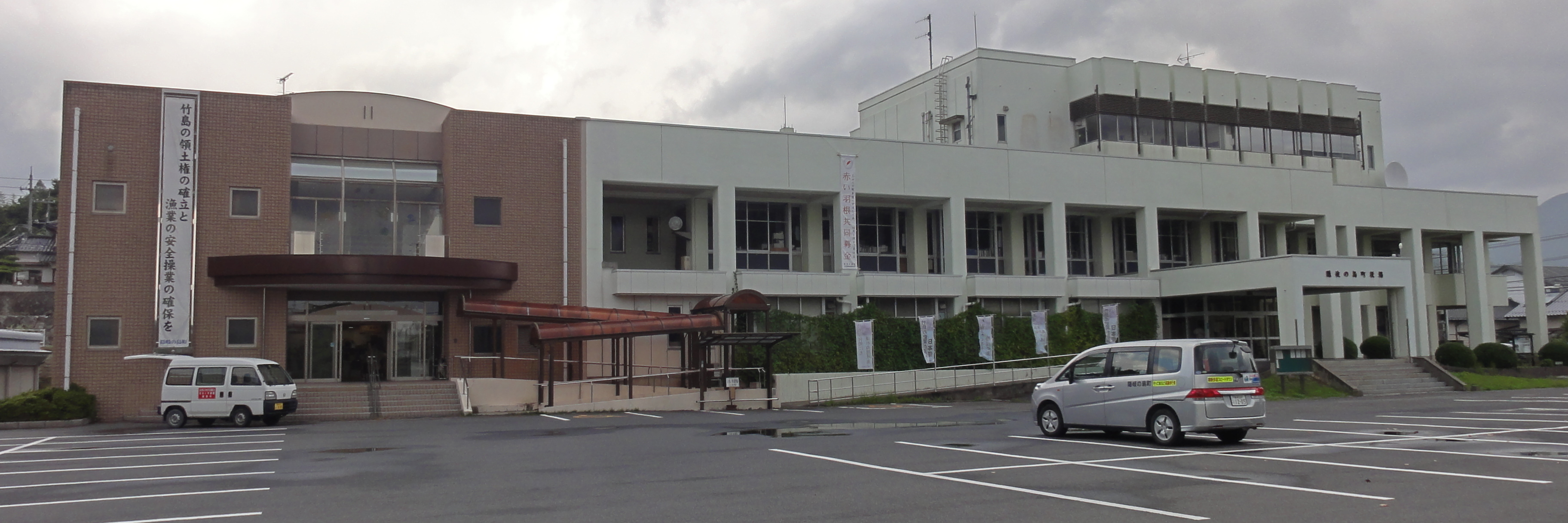
Okinoshima Town Hall

Okinoshima (隠岐の島町, Okinoshima-chō) is a town located on Dōgo, in Oki District, Shimane Prefecture, Japan. As of June 2013, the town had an estimated population of 14,849 and a population density of 61.1 persons per km^{2}. The total area was 242.95 km^{2}.

== Etymology ==
Okinoshima Town takes its name from Okinoshima, the traditional name for all four inhabited Oki Islands. There is no single island named Okinoshima.

== History ==
Okinoshima Town was formed from the merger of the town of Saigō, and the villages of Fuse, Goka and Tsuma on October 1, 2004, all from Oki District.

== Geography ==
Okinoshima occupies all of the island of Dōgo, in the Oki Islands archipelago in the Sea of Japan, along with numerous offshore uninhabited islands and rocks. For administrative purposes, the Japanese government officially considers the disputed islet of Takeshima (Liancourt Rocks) to be a part of the town of Okinoshima.

=== Climate ===
Okinoshima has a humid subtropical climate (Köppen climate classification Cfa) with very warm summers and cool winters. Precipitation is abundant throughout the year. The average annual temperature in Okinoshima is 14.5 °C (58.1 °F). The average annual rainfall is 1,816.4 mm (71.51 in) with September as the wettest month. The temperatures are highest on average in August, at around 26.1 °C (79.0 °F), and lowest in January, at around 4.5 °C (40.1 °F). The highest temperature ever recorded in Okinoshima was 36.0 °C (96.8 °F) on 2 August 2026; the coldest temperature ever recorded was −8.9 °C (16.0 °F) on 26 February 1981.

Climate data for Okinoshima (1991−2020 normals, extremes 1939−present)
Month	Jan	Feb	Mar	Apr	May	Jun	Jul	Aug	Sep	Oct	Nov	Dec	Year
Record high °C (°F)	17.2 (63.0)	20.1 (68.2)	23.5 (74.3)	26.8 (80.2)	31.2 (88.2)	32.2 (90.0)	35.3 (95.5)	36.0 (96.8)	33.9 (93.0)	30.0 (86.0)	24.3 (75.7)	20.2 (68.4)	36.0 (96.8)
Mean maximum °C (°F)	13.8 (56.8)	15.2 (59.4)	18.7 (65.7)	23.4 (74.1)	26.8 (80.2)	29.2 (84.6)	32.4 (90.3)	33.4 (92.1)	30.8 (87.4)	26.2 (79.2)	21.4 (70.5)	16.4 (61.5)	33.6 (92.5)
Mean daily maximum °C (°F)	8.1 (46.6)	8.6 (47.5)	11.7 (53.1)	16.7 (62.1)	21.1 (70.0)	24.3 (75.7)	27.9 (82.2)	29.9 (85.8)	26.1 (79.0)	21.3 (70.3)	16.1 (61.0)	10.8 (51.4)	18.6 (65.4)
Daily mean °C (°F)	4.5 (40.1)	4.6 (40.3)	7.3 (45.1)	12.0 (53.6)	16.7 (62.1)	20.4 (68.7)	24.6 (76.3)	26.1 (79.0)	22.2 (72.0)	16.9 (62.4)	11.9 (53.4)	7.1 (44.8)	14.5 (58.2)
Mean daily minimum °C (°F)	1.2 (34.2)	0.8 (33.4)	2.7 (36.9)	7.1 (44.8)	12.1 (53.8)	16.9 (62.4)	21.8 (71.2)	23.0 (73.4)	18.7 (65.7)	12.7 (54.9)	7.8 (46.0)	3.4 (38.1)	10.7 (51.2)
Mean minimum °C (°F)	−3.0 (26.6)	−3.0 (26.6)	−2.1 (28.2)	0.5 (32.9)	6.5 (43.7)	11.7 (53.1)	17.3 (63.1)	18.5 (65.3)	12.9 (55.2)	6.9 (44.4)	2.6 (36.7)	−0.9 (30.4)	−3.8 (25.2)
Record low °C (°F)	−6.7 (19.9)	−8.9 (16.0)	−6.7 (19.9)	−3.2 (26.2)	1.4 (34.5)	6.8 (44.2)	11.5 (52.7)	13.5 (56.3)	7.3 (45.1)	2.8 (37.0)	−1.8 (28.8)	−4.5 (23.9)	−8.9 (16.0)
Average precipitation mm (inches)	158.3 (6.23)	111.9 (4.41)	125.0 (4.92)	123.5 (4.86)	134.1 (5.28)	165.7 (6.52)	203.9 (8.03)	154.8 (6.09)	234.9 (9.25)	121.6 (4.79)	123.0 (4.84)	159.8 (6.29)	1,816.4 (71.51)
Average snowfall cm (inches)	39 (15)	30 (12)	6 (2.4)	0 (0)	0 (0)	0 (0)	0 (0)	0 (0)	0 (0)	0 (0)	0 (0)	17 (6.7)	93 (37)
Average precipitation days (≥ 1.0 mm)	19.3	14.4	12.4	9.2	7.8	8.8	10.0	8.0	10.0	10.0	12.7	18.4	141
Average snowy days (≥ 1 cm)	8.8	6.9	1.6	0	0	0	0	0	0	0	0	4.4	21.7
Average relative humidity (%)	73	73	72	72	74	81	83	81	79	76	74	73	76
Mean monthly sunshine hours	69.2	87.7	142.1	190.0	214.0	164.6	160.5	205.6	149.0	152.7	106.0	76.7	1,718.1
Source: Japan Meteorological Agency

Climate data for Oki Airport, Okinoshima (2003−2020 normals, extremes 2003−present)
Month	Jan	Feb	Mar	Apr	May	Jun	Jul	Aug	Sep	Oct	Nov	Dec	Year
Record high °C (°F)	15.7 (60.3)	18.9 (66.0)	21.4 (70.5)	26.0 (78.8)	30.6 (87.1)	31.4 (88.5)	34.5 (94.1)	35.3 (95.5)	33.4 (92.1)	28.6 (83.5)	24.1 (75.4)	19.4 (66.9)	35.3 (95.5)
Mean daily maximum °C (°F)	7.4 (45.3)	8.1 (46.6)	11.2 (52.2)	15.7 (60.3)	20.3 (68.5)	23.6 (74.5)	27.0 (80.6)	29.4 (84.9)	25.5 (77.9)	20.8 (69.4)	15.8 (60.4)	10.2 (50.4)	17.9 (64.2)
Daily mean °C (°F)	4.6 (40.3)	5.0 (41.0)	7.6 (45.7)	12.0 (53.6)	16.5 (61.7)	20.2 (68.4)	24.0 (75.2)	26.0 (78.8)	22.5 (72.5)	17.5 (63.5)	12.7 (54.9)	7.3 (45.1)	14.7 (58.4)
Mean daily minimum °C (°F)	1.7 (35.1)	1.7 (35.1)	3.8 (38.8)	8.0 (46.4)	12.9 (55.2)	17.5 (63.5)	21.8 (71.2)	23.4 (74.1)	19.8 (67.6)	14.3 (57.7)	9.4 (48.9)	4.3 (39.7)	11.6 (52.8)
Record low °C (°F)	−7.0 (19.4)	−5.6 (21.9)	−3.0 (26.6)	−0.4 (31.3)	4.4 (39.9)	9.9 (49.8)	16.1 (61.0)	17.3 (63.1)	11.9 (53.4)	5.8 (42.4)	1.5 (34.7)	−3.6 (25.5)	−7.0 (19.4)
Average precipitation mm (inches)	103.5 (4.07)	76.5 (3.01)	97.5 (3.84)	117.1 (4.61)	120.8 (4.76)	130.5 (5.14)	197.4 (7.77)	157.0 (6.18)	204.9 (8.07)	116.4 (4.58)	94.3 (3.71)	123.2 (4.85)	1,539.1 (60.59)
Average precipitation days (≥ 1.0 mm)	16.9	12.7	11.8	9.1	7.1	8.0	10.1	8.1	9.2	9.1	11.5	18.4	132
Source: Japan Meteorological Agency

=== Demographics ===
Per Japanese census data, the population of Okinoshima in 2020 is 13,433 people. Okinoshima has been conducting censuses since 1920.

Historical population
Year	Pop.	±%
1920	21,815	—
1925	21,351	−2.1%
1930	21,129	−1.0%
1935	20,516	−2.9%
1940	20,046	−2.3%
1945	26,332	+31.4%
1950	28,044	+6.5%
1955	27,887	−0.6%
1960	26,846	−3.7%
1965	23,669	−11.8%
1970	20,533	−13.2%
1975	19,797	−3.6%
1980	20,043	+1.2%
1985	19,675	−1.8%
1990	19,090	−3.0%
1995	18,367	−3.8%
2000	18,045	−1.8%
2005	16,904	−6.3%
2010	15,488	−8.4%
2015	14,608	−5.7%
2020	13,433	−8.0%
Okinoshima population statistics

== Economy ==
The town economy is primarily based on agriculture and commercial fishing.

== Transportation ==
=== Airport ===
- Oki Airport (OKI), a Class III facility with a 1991 m runway, is located within the town. It provides air service to Osaka International Airport ("Itami") and Izumo Airport.

=== Highway ===
- National Route 485

=== Sea Port ===
- Saigō Port is the major seaport and ferry terminal in the Oki Islands

== Sister cities ==
- Krotoszyn, Poland, since 2016

== Local attractions ==
- Araki Shrine
- A set of two station bells designated as Important Cultural Property of Japan is located at the (Oki family treasure hall (億岐家宝物館, Oki-ke Hōmotsukan) in Okinoshima.

== Notable people from Okinoshima ==
- Okinoumi Ayumi – sumo wrestler, the first wrestler from Shimane Prefecture to reach the top makuuchi division in 88 years
- Kai Hirano – professional soccer player
