= J-Air =

Regional airline of Japan

J-Air Co., Ltd. 株式会社ジェイエア Kabushiki-gaisha Jei Ea

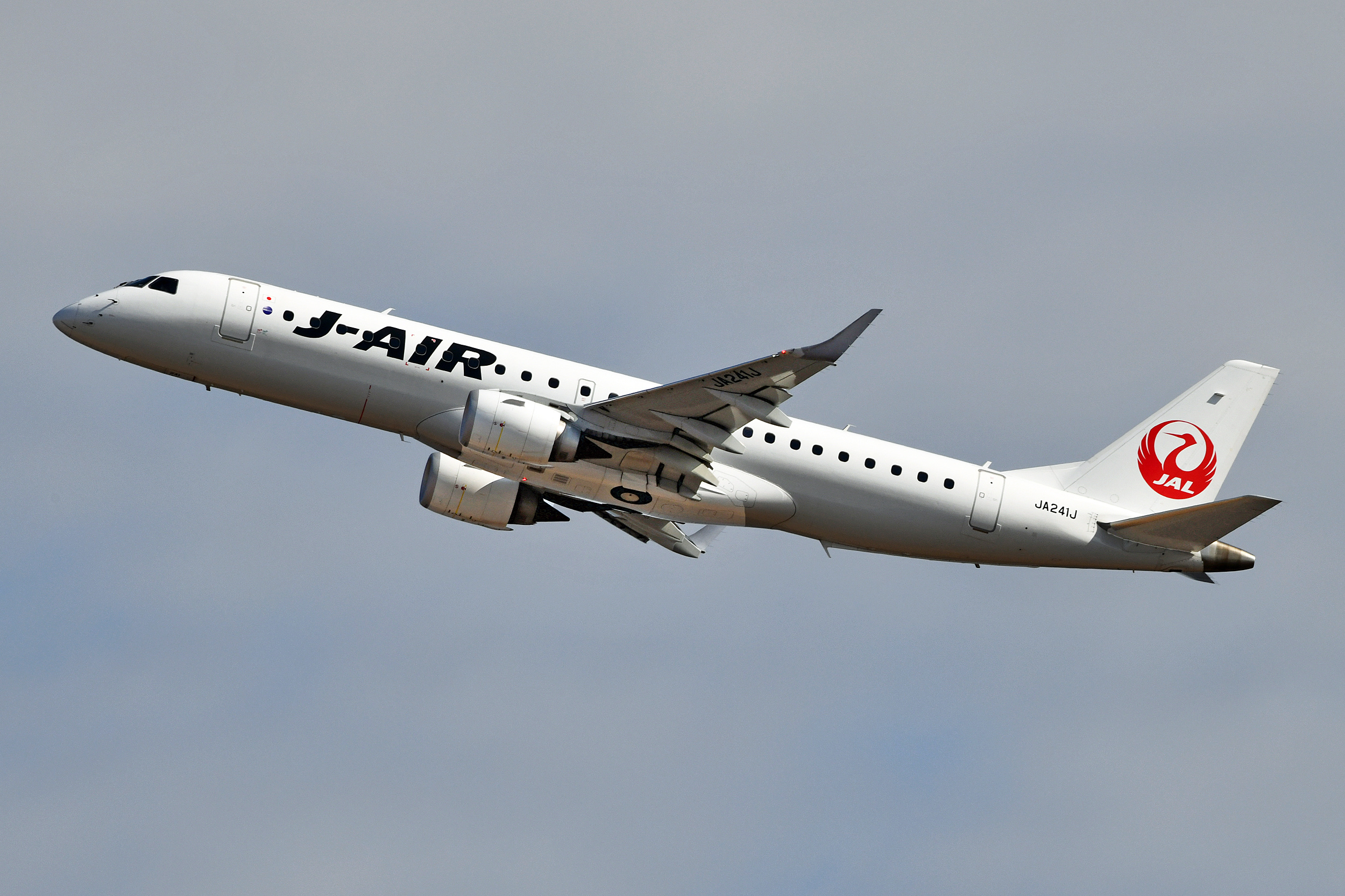
- A J-Air Embraer 190
IATA	ICAO	Call sign
JL	JAL	JAPAN AIR
- Founded: April 1991; 35 years ago (as JAL Flight Academy)
- Commenced operations: November 1996; 29 years ago (as J-Air)
- Operating bases: Fukuoka; Kagoshima; Osaka–Itami; Sapporo–Chitose
- Frequent-flyer program: JAL Mileage Bank
- Alliance: Oneworld (affiliate)
- Fleet size: 32
- Destinations: 17
- Parent company: JAL Group
- Headquarters: Itami Airport, Osaka, Japan
- Key people: Shunsuke Honda (President)
- Website: www.jair.co.jp

J-Air is a Japanese regional airline with its headquarters at Itami Airport near Toyonaka, Osaka Prefecture, Japan and its main base at Itami Airport. J-Air previously had its headquarters in Nagoya, Aichi Prefecture. Its operations include scheduled passenger services to 17 destinations across regional Japan, under Japan Airlines flight numbers. The airline has a fleet of 32 aircraft, consisting of Embraer 170s and 190s linking tier-two and tier-three cities in Japan as to bypass JAL's congested hub in Tokyo (both Narita and Haneda).

J-Air is a wholly owned subsidiary of Japan's flag carrier, Japan Airlines (JAL) and an affiliate member of the Oneworld alliance. The airline was founded on 8 August 1996, when JAL restructured JAL Flight Academy and J-Air was separated; and began operations as a separate entity from Hiroshima-Nishi Airport on 1 November. Faced with limited opportunities for route expansion at Hiroshima, the airline relocated to its new home at Nagoya Airfield, after the opening of Chūbu Centrair International Airport, on 17 February 2005. In the fiscal year ended 31 March 1999, J-Air, together with its sister airlines within the JAL Group, carried over 32 million passengers and over 1.1 million tons of cargo and mail.

== History ==
JAL Flight Academy (JFA) was established by Japan Airlines (JAL) in April 1991, as a flight training school subsidiary based at Omura Airport, Nagasaki. It provided conversion training for its flight engineers to become pilots. In April 1991, a new division of JFA was created to operate scheduled services to succeed the troubled Nishi Seto Airlink services, a commuter airline serving cities in western Japan. Since the introduction of the 19-seats Jetstream 31s (JS31) in September 1991, the aircraft progressively replaced the Embraer EMB 110 Bandeirante inherited from Nishi Seto.

In August 1996, JAL Flight Academy was restructured, J-Air was separated and established as a wholly owned regional subsidiary airline of Japan Airlines on 8 August. On 1 November, the airline inaugurated its first flight from Hiroshima-Nishi Airport and was building up service on smaller-demand domestic routes, which larger aircraft could not serve economically. However, the local government subsidy was terminated at the end of the 2000 fiscal year and the airline was required to become self-sufficient. As part of its domestic marketing strategy, JAL found a niche market where the 100-plus-seats Boeing 737s were too large and frequent services were in demand, and began repositioning the airline. Fifty-seats Bombardier CRJ200s were introduced and progressively replaced the five JS31s until completion in August 2003.

Despite the introduction of the CRJ200s, there were limited opportunities for route expansion from its home at Hiroshima-Nishi Airport. The airline decided to move to Nagoya Airfield, after the opening of Chūbu Centrair International Airport. On 17 February 2005, J-Air formally relocate to its new home at Nagoya Airfield. In order to strengthen the recognition of the JAL brand and improve customer convenience, the airline disposed its own flight numbers and changed to JAL flight numbers from 1 April 2005. At the same time, it formally ended flight to Hiroshima-Nishi which has been the airline base for almost 9 years with the last flight to Miyazaki.

On 1 April 2007, J-Air, together with four of its sister airlines within the JAL Group, joined Oneworld and became a Oneworld affiliate member. On 18 June, JAL signed a purchase agreement with Embraer for ten Embraer 170 jets, with options to acquire another five aircraft. The contract value was worth approximately US$435 million, if all the options are exercised. The aircraft will be used for linking tier-two and tier-three cities in Japan as to bypass the airline's congested hub in Tokyo. The aircraft was configured to seat 76 passengers in a single-class layout and was designated for J-Air. The first aircraft was delivered on 3 October 2008, received the type certification from the Japan Civil Aviation Bureau (JCAB) on 27 October and operated its first flight in February 2009.

J-Air has been reported by Japanese newspapers and television to be leaving Nagoya Airfield in a phased transition with many flights leaving October 2010 and all flights leaving by end of March 2011.

== Destinations ==
J-Air operates to the following destinations (as of 31 August 2026):

Island	City	Airport	Notes	Refs
Hokkaido	Hakodate	Hakodate Airport		
Hokkaido	Ōzora	Memanbetsu Airport		
Hokkaido	Sapporo	New Chitose Airport	Hub	
Hokkaido	Tokachi-Obihiro	Tokachi–Obihiro Airport	Terminated	
Honshu	Akita	Akita Airport		
Honshu	Aomori	Aomori Airport		
Honshu	Fukushima	Fukushima Airport	Terminated	
Honshu	Iwate-Hanamaki	Hanamaki Airport		
Honshu	Hiroshima	Hiroshima Airport	Terminated	
Honshu	Izumo	Izumo Airport		
Honshu	Komatsu	Komatsu Airport	Terminated	
Honshu	Misawa	Misawa Airport		
Honshu	Nanki Shirahama	Nanki–Shirahama Airport	Terminated	
Honshu	Niigata	Niigata Airport		
Honshu	Oki Islands	Oki Airport		
Honshu	Osaka	Kansai International Airport	Terminated	
Honshu	Osaka	Itami Airport	Hub	
Honshu	Sendai	Sendai Airport		
Honshu	Shizuoka	Shizuoka Airport	Terminated	
Honshu	Tokyo	Haneda Airport	Terminated	
Honshu	Tottori	Tottori Airport	Terminated	
Honshu	Ube	Yamaguchi Ube Airport		
Honshu	Yamagata	Yamagata Airport		
Kyushu	Fukuoka	Fukuoka Airport	Focus city	
Kyushu	Kagoshima	Kagoshima Airport	Focus city	
Kyushu	Kitakyushu	Kitakyushu Airport	Terminated	
Kyushu	Kumamoto	Kumamoto Airport		
Kyushu	Miyazaki	Miyazaki Airport		
Kyushu	Nagasaki	Nagasaki Airport		
Kyushu	Ōita	Oita Airport		
Ryukyu Islands	Amami	Amami Airport		
Ryukyu Islands	Tanegashima	New Tanegashima Airport		
Ryukyu Islands	Tokunoshima	Tokunoshima Airport		
Shikoku	Kōchi	Kōchi Airport		
Shikoku	Matsuyama	Matsuyama Airport		
Shikoku	Tokushima	Tokushima Airport		

=== Codeshare agreements ===
J-Air has codeshare agreements with the following airlines:

- China Airlines

== Fleet ==
=== Current fleet ===
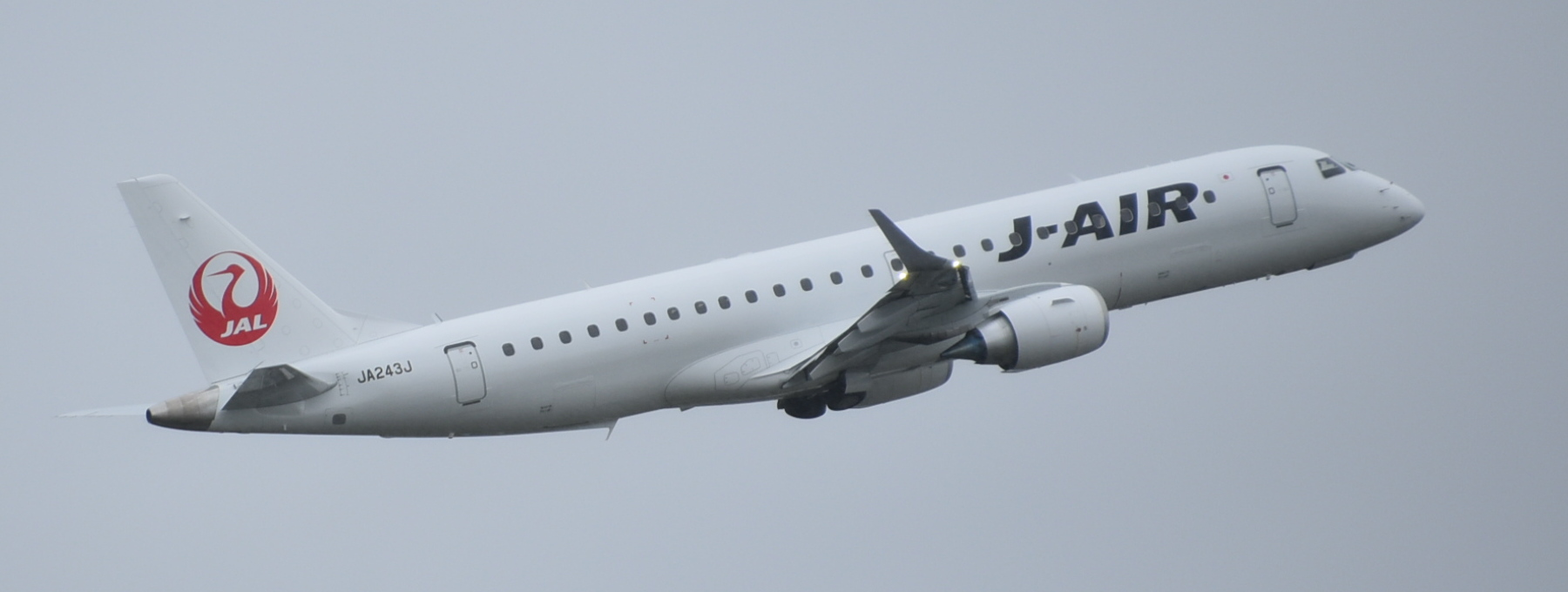
J-Air Embraer 190

As of July 2026, J-Air operates the following aircraft:

Current fleet of J-Air
Aircraft	In fleet	Orders	Passengers			Notes
Aircraft	In fleet	Orders	C	Y	Total	Notes
Embraer 170	18	—	—	76	76	
Embraer 190	14	—	15	80	95	
Embraer 190-E2	—	16	TBA			Deliveries begin 2029. Order with 10 options.
Total	32	16				

=== Former fleet ===
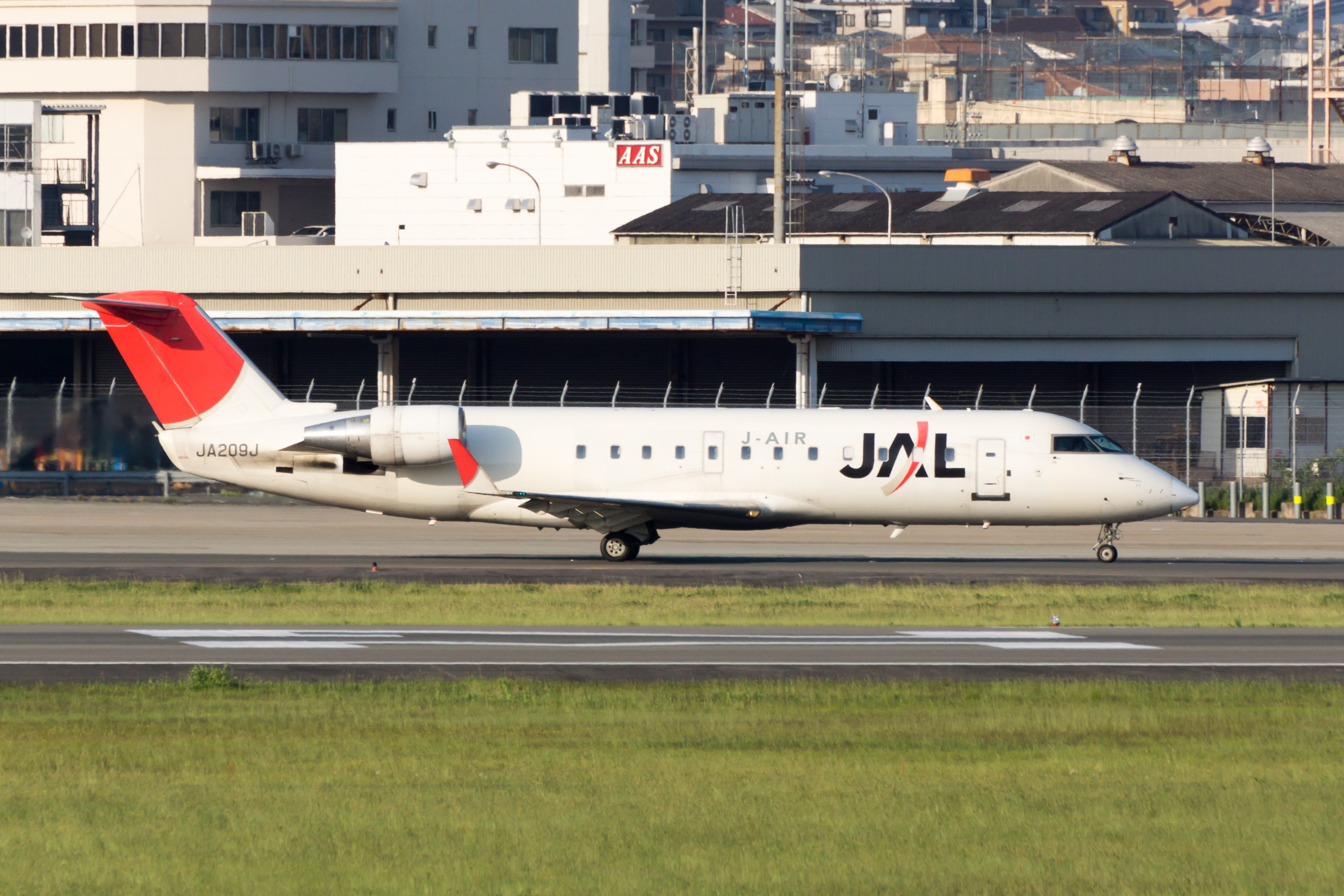
Former J-Air CRJ-200

As of August 2025, J-Air operated 18 Embraer 170 and 14 Embraer 190.

J-Air also formerly also operated the following aircraft types:

Former fleet of J-Air
Aircraft	Total	Introduced	Retired	Notes	Refs.
BAe Jetstream 31	5	September 1991	August 2003		
Bombardier CRJ200	9	April 2001	February 2018		
Embraer EMB 110	Unknown	April 1991	Unknown		

== See also ==
- Air transport in Japan
- List of airports in Japan
- List of Japanese companies
- Transport in Japan
