= Chūgoku region =

Region of Japan

Coordinates: 35°03′N 134°04′E

Chūgoku region 中国地方
- Region
- The Chūgoku region in Japan

- Geofeatures map of Chugoku
- Interactive map of Chūgoku region
- Country: Japan

Area
  - Total: 31,922.26 km^{2} (12,325.25 sq mi)

Population (1 October 2025)
  - Total: 6,909,261
  - Density: 216.4402/km^{2} (560.5776/sq mi)

GDP (2022)
  - Total: JP¥30,792 trillion US$227 billion
- Time zone: UTC+9 (JST)

The Chūgoku region (Japanese: 中国地方, Hepburn: Chūgoku chihō; [c̟͡ɕɨ́ɨ̀.ɡò̞.kɯ̈̀, -ŋò̞.kɯ̈̀, c̟͡ɕɨ̀ɨ́.ɡó̞.kɯ̥̈ c̟͡ɕí.hò̞ò̞, -c̟͡ɕi̥.hò̞ò̞, -c̟͡ɕi̥.hó̞ò̞, c̟͡ɕɨ́ɨ́.ɡó̞.kɯ̥̈-, -ŋó̞.kɯ̥̈-] (Note: The accented pronunciation, [c̟͡ɕɨ́ɨ̀.ɡò̞.kɯ̈̀], is specific to the names of the Chūgoku region and China. For a historical type of Japanese provinces, the unaccented pronunciation, [c̟͡ɕɨ̀ɨ́.ɡó̞.kɯ̈́, c̟͡ɕɨ́ɨ́-], is used instead.)), also known as the San'in-San'yō (山陰山陽地方, San'in-San'yō-chihō) region, is the westernmost region of Honshū, the largest island of Japan. It consists of the prefectures of Hiroshima, Okayama, Shimane, Tottori and Yamaguchi. As of the 2025 census, it has a population of 6,909,261.

== History ==
Chūgoku literally means "middle country", but the origin of the name is unclear. Historically, Japan was divided into a number of provinces called koku, which were in turn classified according to both their power and their distances from the administrative center in Kansai. Under the latter classification, most provinces are divided into "near countries" (近国, kingoku), "middle countries" (中国, chūgoku), and "far countries" (遠国, ongoku). Therefore, one explanation is that Chūgoku was originally used to refer to the collection of "middle countries" to the west of the capital. However, only five (fewer than half) of the provinces normally considered part of Chūgoku region were in fact classified as middle countries, and the term never applied to the many middle countries to the east of Kansai. Therefore, an alternative explanation is that Chūgoku referred to provinces between Kansai and Kyūshū, which was historically important as the link between Japan and mainland Asia.

Historically, Chūgoku referred to the 16 provinces of San'indō (山陰道) and San'yōdō (山陽道), which led to the region's alternative name described below. However, because some of the easternmost provinces were later subsumed into prefectures based primarily in Kansai, those areas are, strictly speaking, not part of the Chūgoku region in modern usage.

In Japanese, the characters 中国 and the reading Chūgoku are also used to mean "China". The same characters are used in Chinese to refer to China, but pronounced Zhōngguó in Mandarin, lit. "Middle Kingdom" or "Middle Country" (Wade Giles: Chung^{1}-kuo^{2}). It is similar to the use of the West Country in English for a region of England. However, before the end of the Second World War, China was more commonly called shina (支那/シナ; which shares the same etymology of the word "China" in English) in order to avoid confusing the Chūgoku region. Due to the extensive use of this word during the Sino-Japanese War, the term shina has become an offensive word and was abandoned thereafter, and Chūgoku has since then been used instead of shina. In modern times, primarily in the tourism industry, for the same purpose, the Chūgoku region is also called the "San'in‐San'yō region". San'in ("yin of the mountains") is the northern part facing the Sea of Japan. San'yō ("yang of the mountains") is the southern part facing the Seto Inland Sea. These names were created using the yin and yang‐based place‐naming scheme.

The city of Hiroshima, the "capital" of the Chūgoku region, was rebuilt after being destroyed by an atomic bomb in 1945, and is now an industrial metropolis of more than one million people.

Overfishing and pollution reduced the productivity of the Inland Sea fishing grounds; and San'yo is an area concentrated on heavy industry. In contrast, San'in is less industrialized with an agricultural economy.

== Geography ==
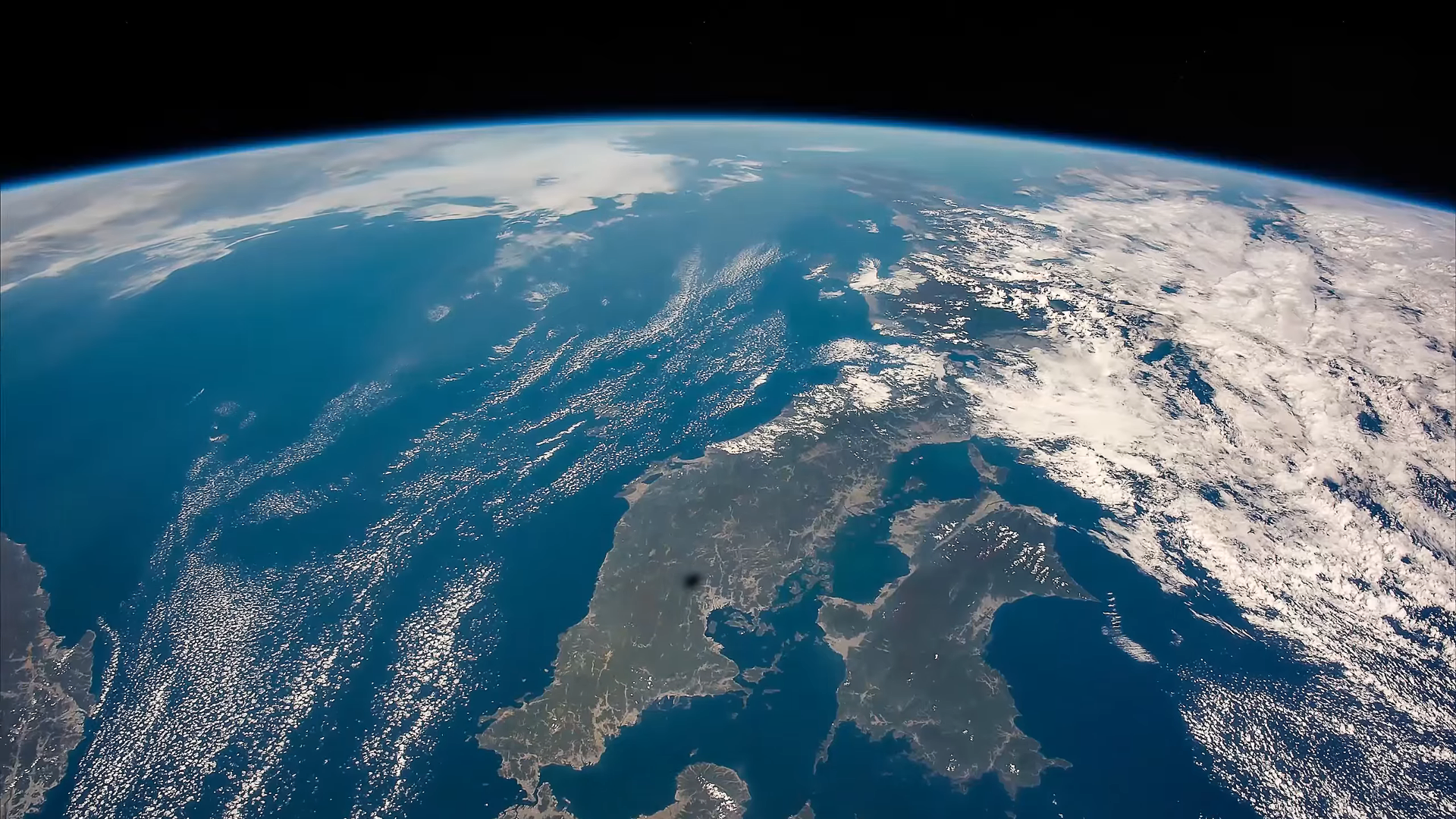
Chūgoku region and Shikoku seen from the International Space Station

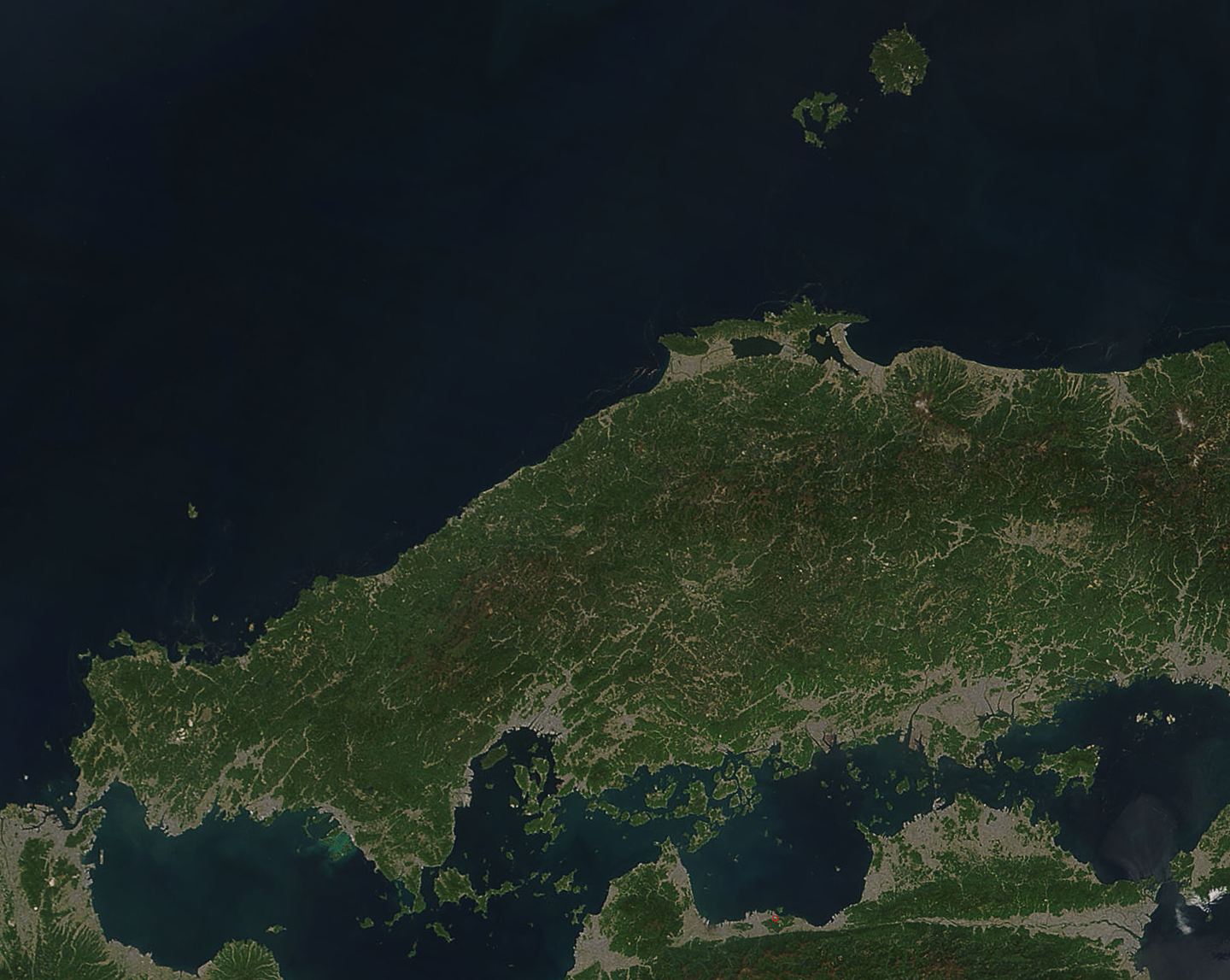
Chūgoku, satellite photo

The Chūgoku region consists of the following prefectures: Hiroshima, Yamaguchi, Shimane, and Tottori. Okayama is also included, although only Bitchū Province was considered a "middle country" (中国); Mimasaka Province and Bizen Province, the other two components of modern-day Okayama, were considered "near countries" (近国). Kyūshū, Shikoku, and Kansai neighbor the Chūgoku region.

The Chūgoku region is characterized by irregular rolling hills and limited plain areas and is divided into two distinct parts by mountains running east and west through its center.

== Demographics ==
The two largest metropolitan areas in Chūgoku region are Hiroshima and Okayama whose total population of the two metropolitan areas amount to 2.808 million as of 2020. Their Urban Employment Area amounts to around 3 million people for the Chūgoku region. The rest of Chūgoku region is sparsely populated and very rural.

Per Japanese census data, the Chūgoku region as a whole has experienced a steady population decline since 1992, with some prefectures within the region experiencing declines since 1985. The region reached a peak population of roughly 7.8 million in 1991.

Historical population
| Year | Pop. | ±% |
|---|---|---|
| 1920 | 4,971,000 | — |
| 1930 | 5,341,000 | +7.4% |
| 1940 | 5,718,000 | +7.1% |
| 1950 | 6,797,000 | +18.9% |
| 1960 | 6,944,000 | +2.2% |
| 1970 | 6,997,000 | +0.8% |
| 1980 | 7,586,000 | +8.4% |
| 1990 | 7,746,000 | +2.1% |
| 2000 | 7,732,499 | −0.2% |
| 2010 | 7,563,428 | −2.2% |
| 2020 | 7,328,339 | −3.1% |

== Cities ==
Designated cities

- Hiroshima (population: 1,200,000)
- Okayama (population: 720,000)
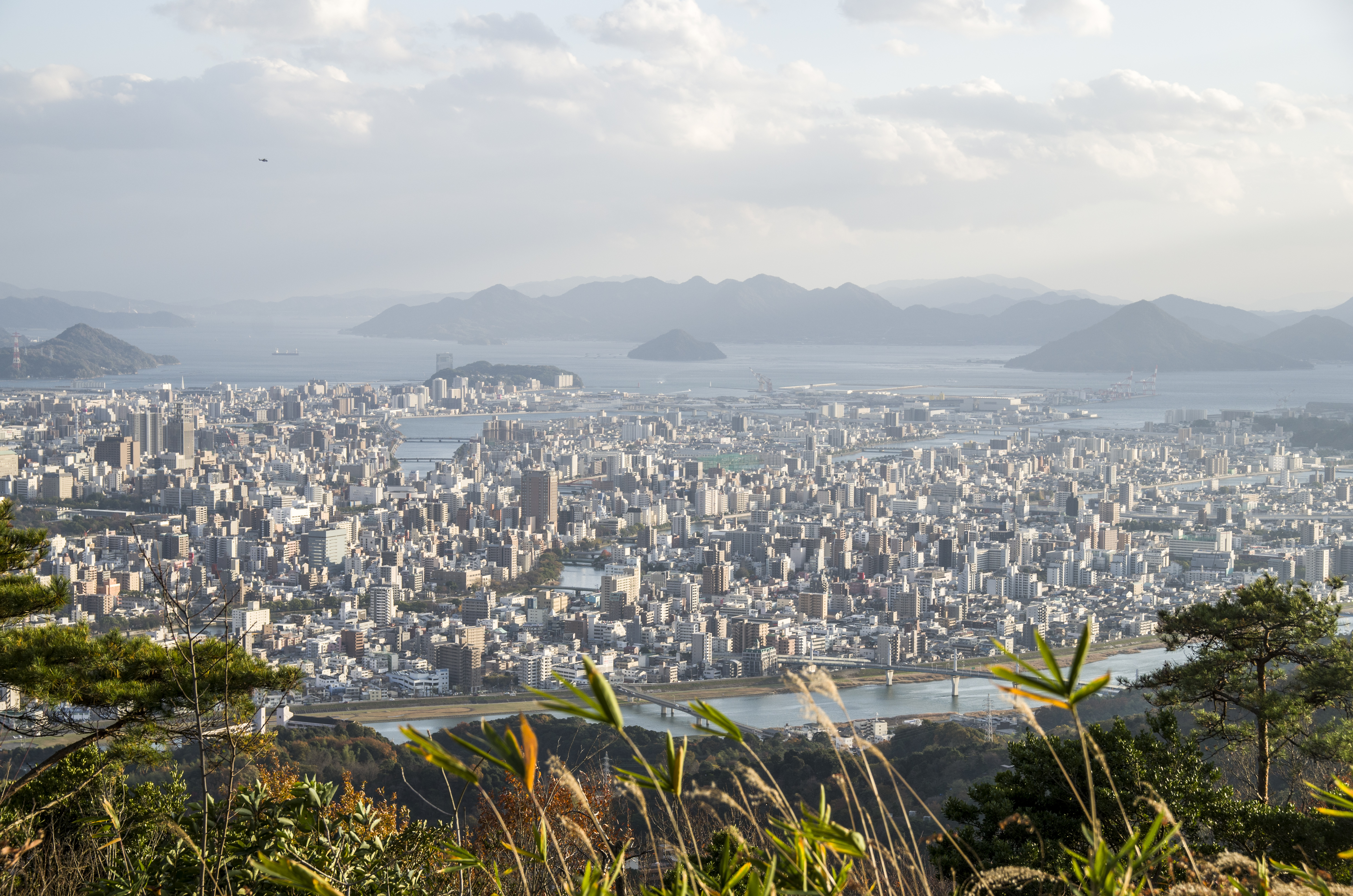
Hiroshima City

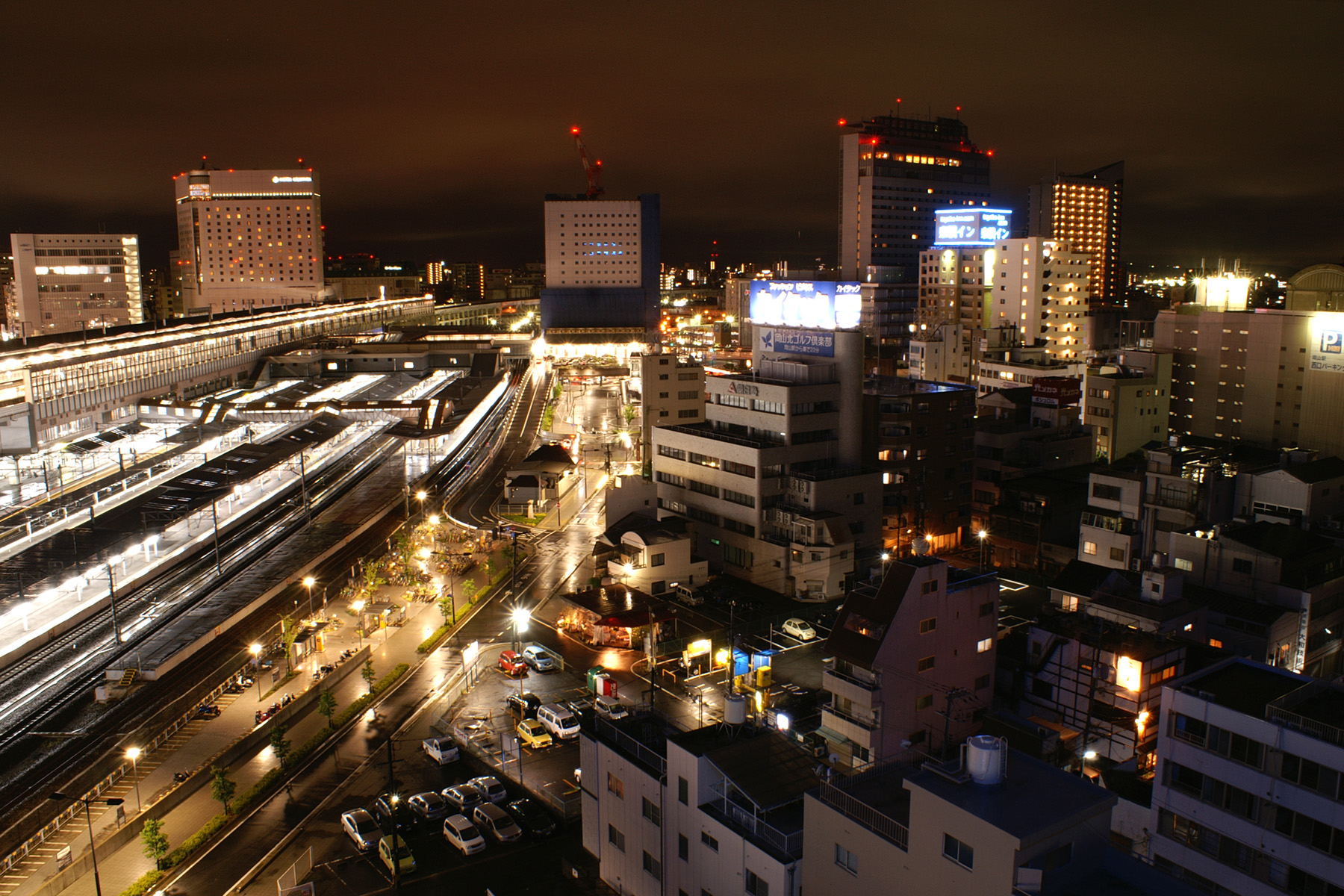
Okayama City

Core cities

- Kurashiki (population: 480,000)
- Fukuyama (population: 460,000)
- Shimonoseki (population: 260,000)
- Kure (population: 220,000)
- Matsue (population: 210,000)
- Tottori (population: 200,000)
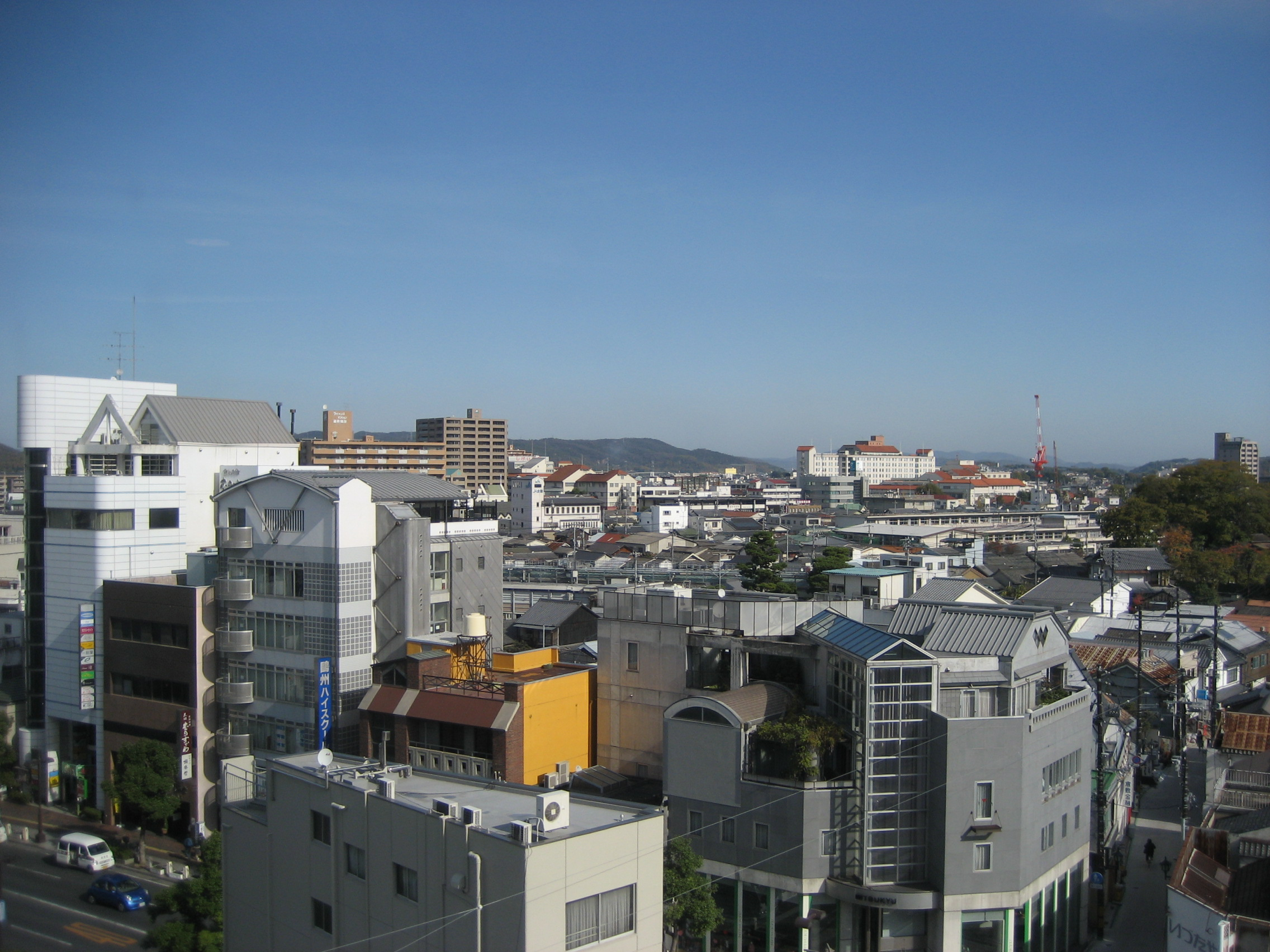
Kurashiki City

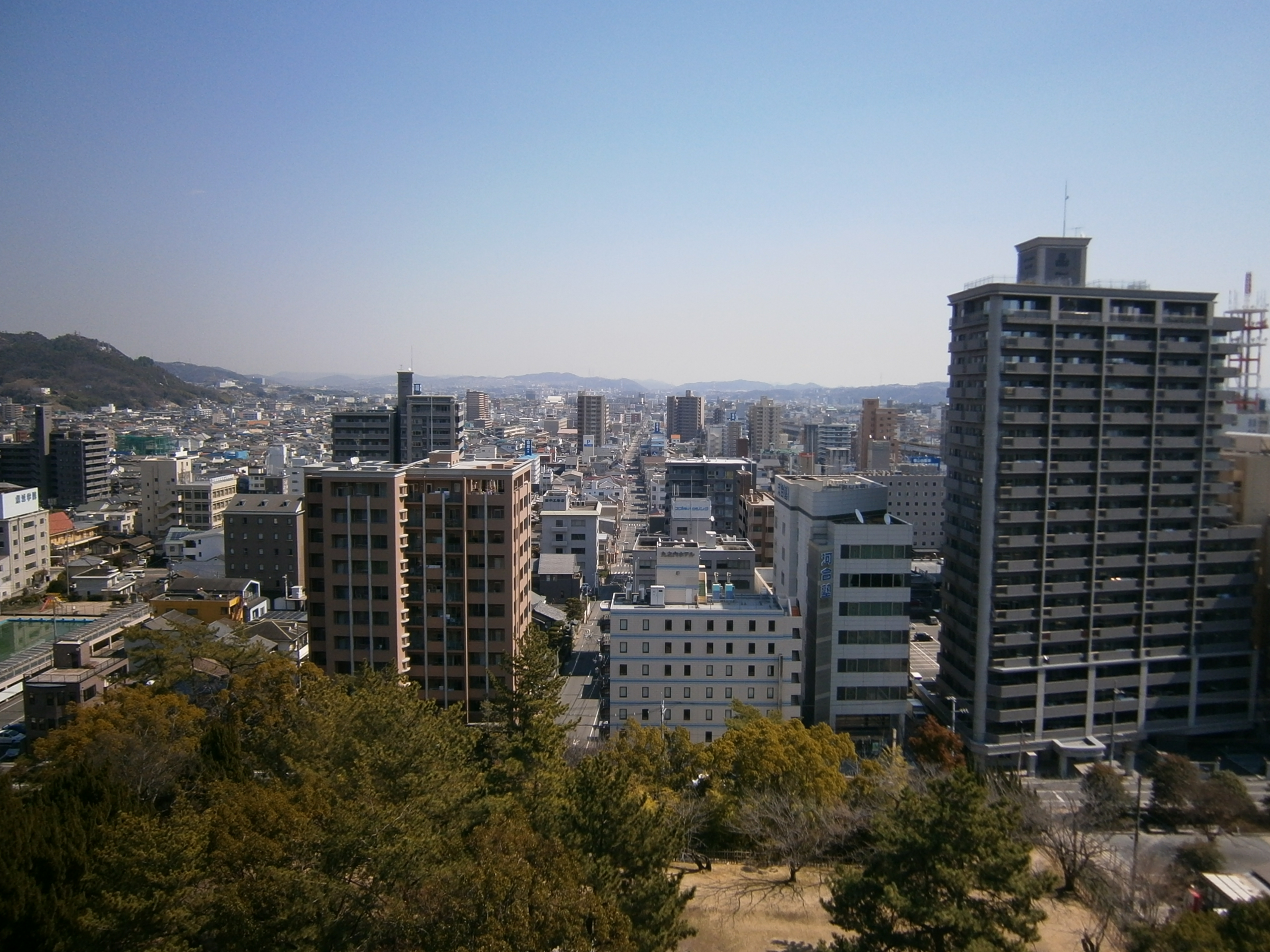
Fukuyama City

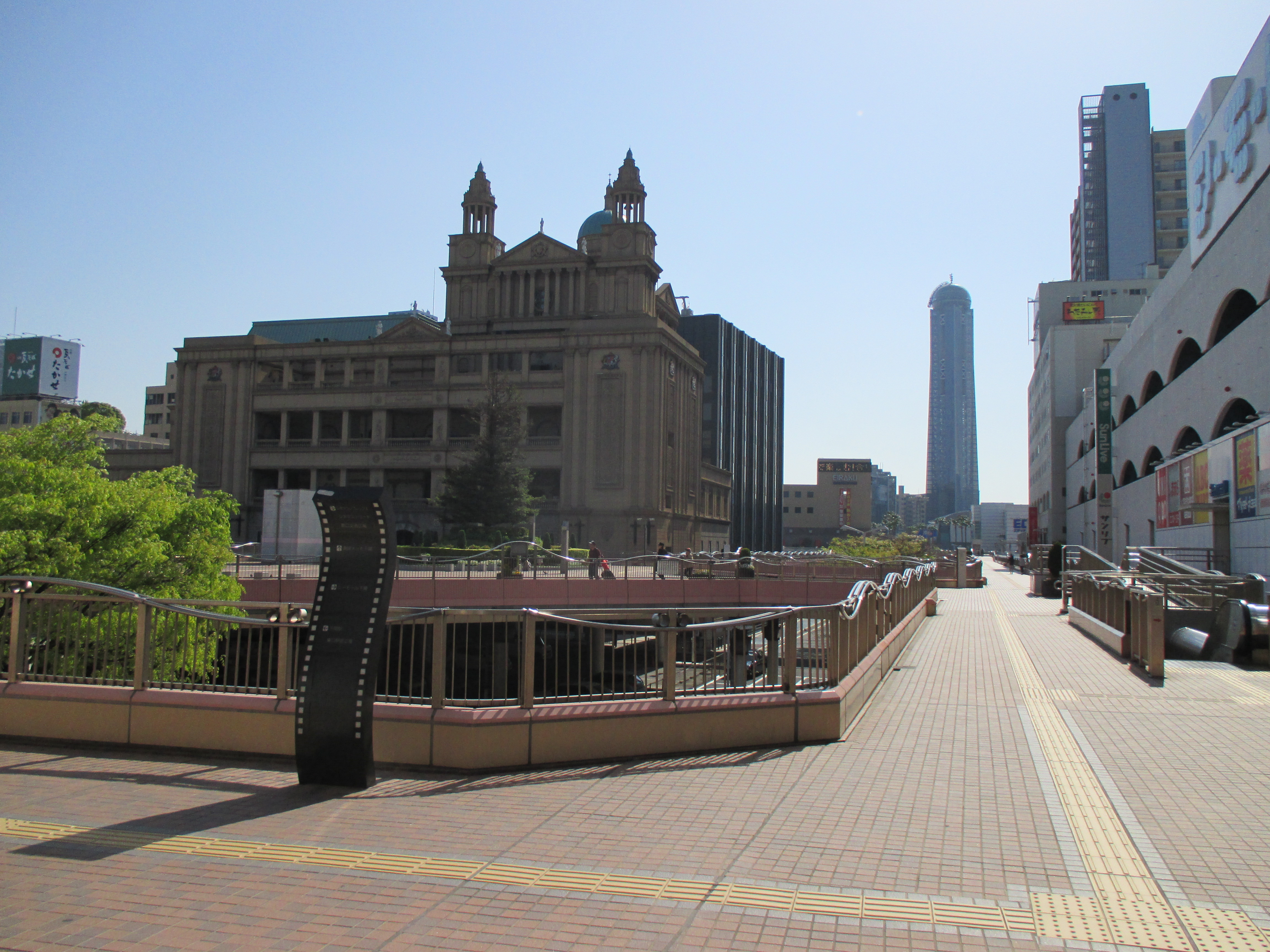
Shimonoseki City

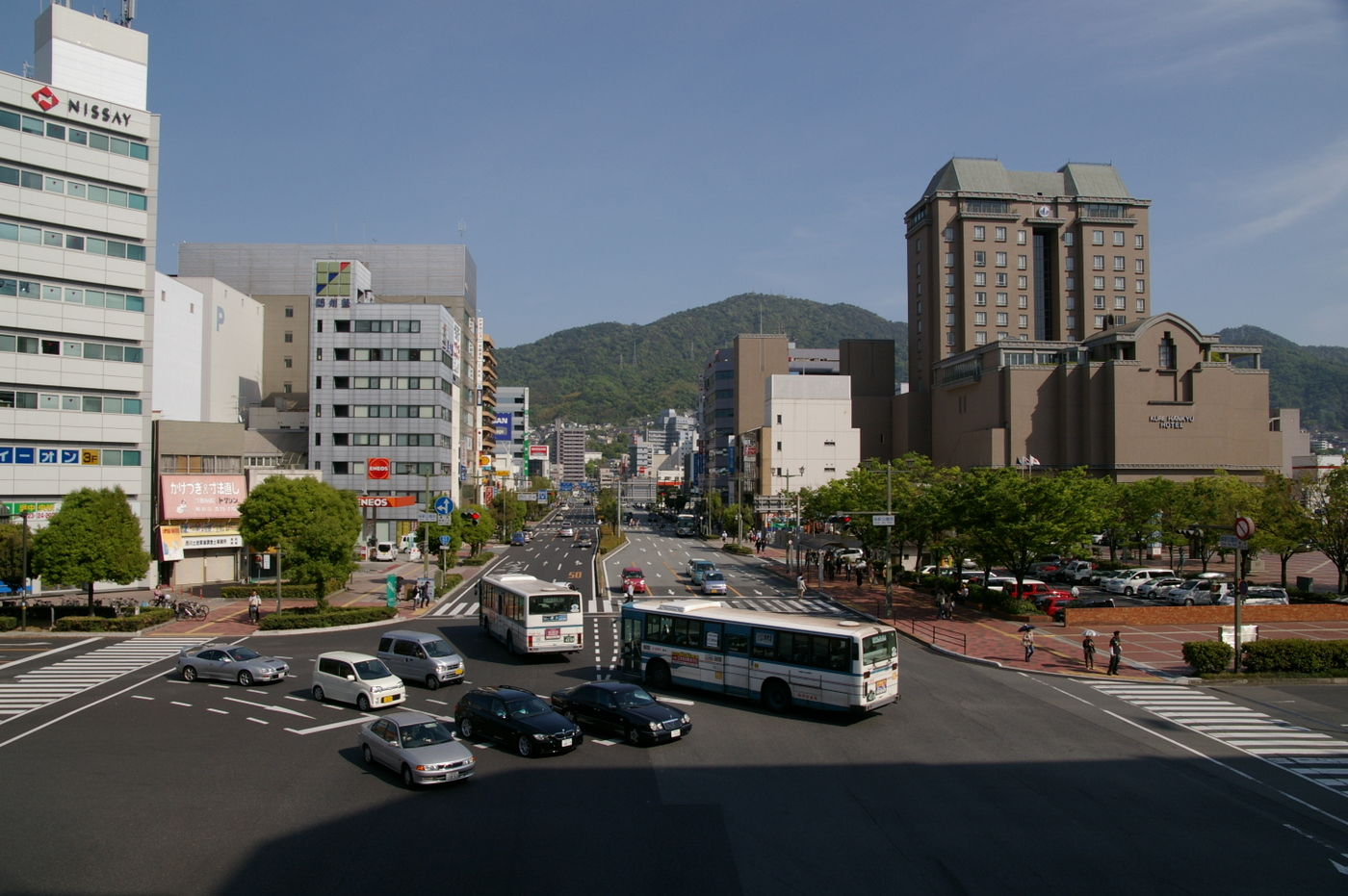
Kure City

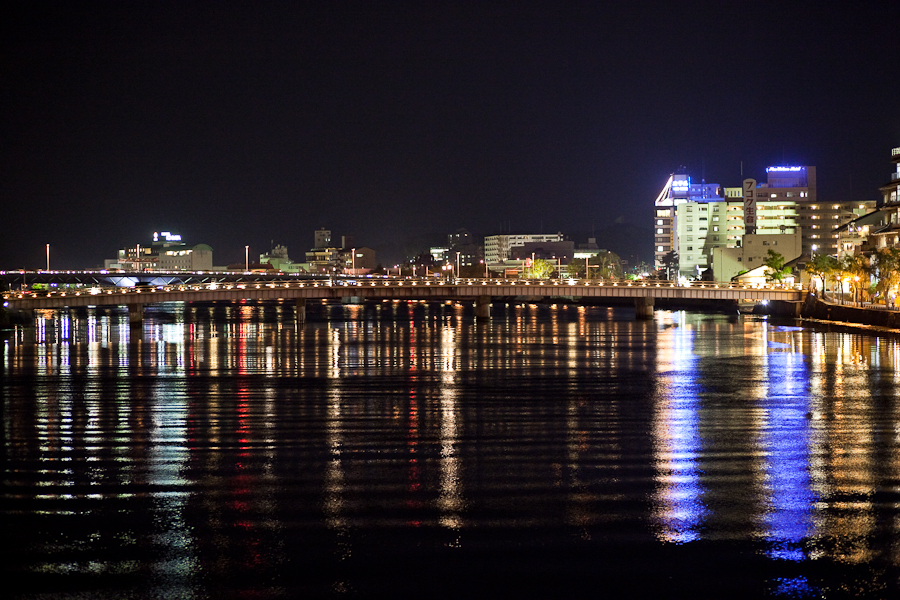
Matsue City

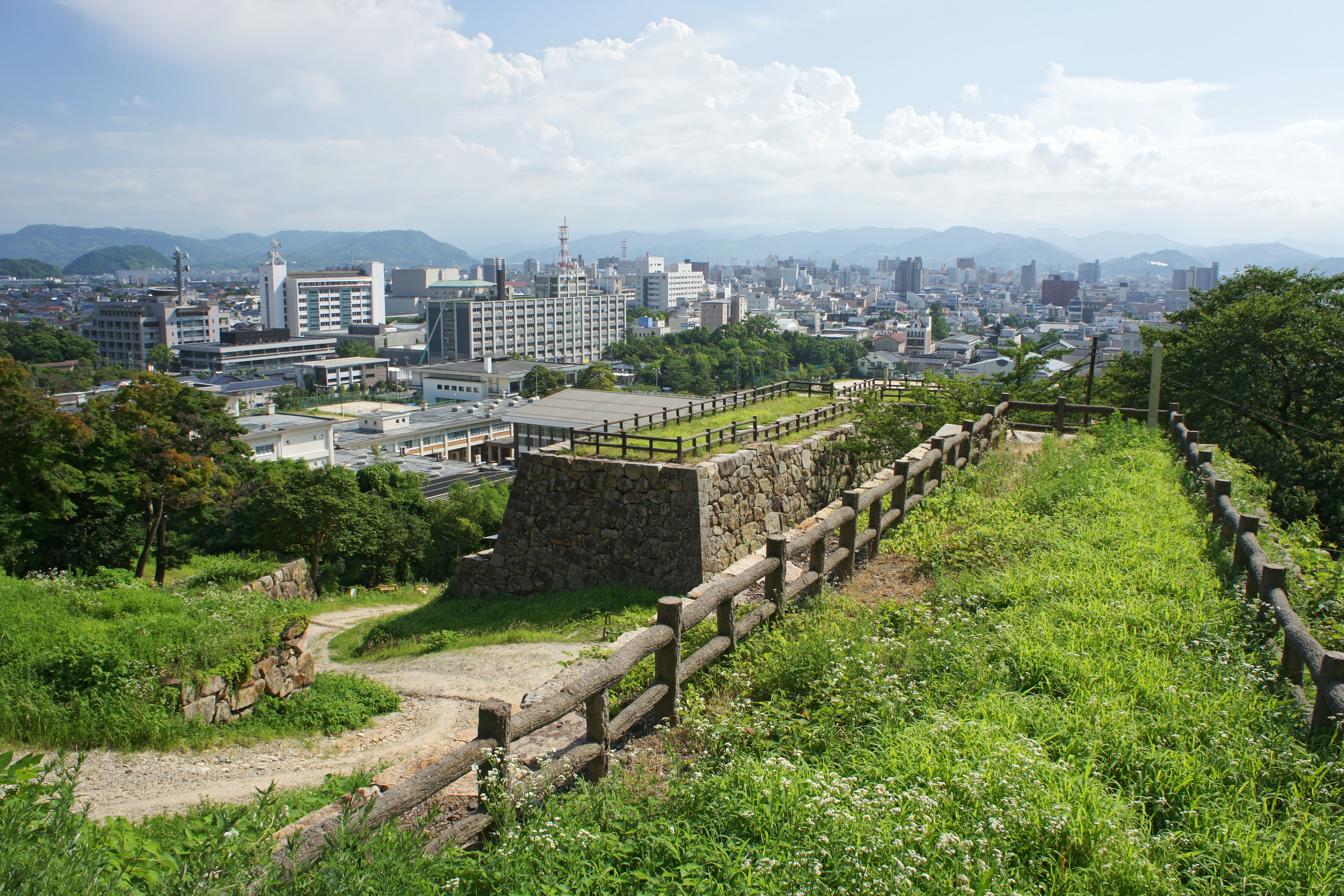
Tottori City

Other major cities

- Yamaguchi (population: 200,000)
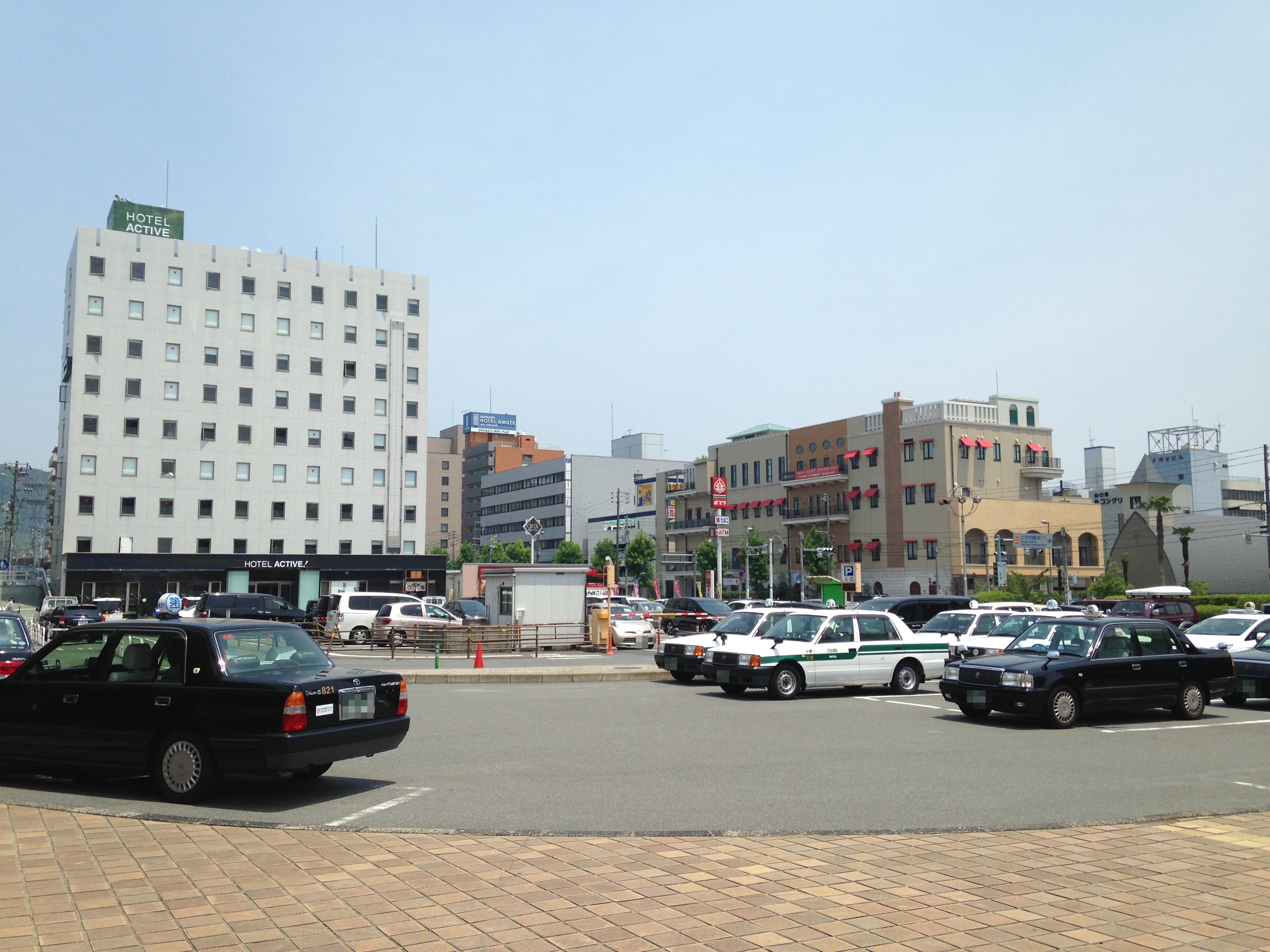
Yamaguchi City

== Transport ==
The region's largest airport is Hiroshima Airport which is located 50 km (31 mi) east of Hiroshima. There are also smaller airports across the regions including Iwami Airport, Izumo Airport, Okayama Airport, Yonago Kitaro Airport, Oki Airport, Tottori Airport, Iwakuni Kintaikyo Airport, and Yamaguchi Ube Airport.

== Fiction ==
- Lian Hearn used a feudal Chūgoku (translated as the Middle Country) as the setting for her Tales of the Otori trilogy.
- In B. Ichi, Chūgoku is referred to as "the land of martial arts".

== See also ==
- Chūgoku dialect and Umpaku dialect
- Geography of Japan
- List of regions in Japan
- Names of China
- San'in region
- San'yō region
