= Tottori =

Tottori can refer to:

- Tottori Prefecture, a Japanese prefecture with 613,229 people
  - Tottori (city), a Japanese city with 202,015 people
- Tottori Domain, a Japanese domain in the Edo Period
- Tottori Airport

== See also ==
- Atelier Totori: The Adventurer of Arland
