= Tsuma, Shimane =

Human settlement in Japan

Tsuma (都万村, Tsuma-mura) was a village located in Oki District, Shimane Prefecture, Japan.

As of 2003, the village had an estimated population of 2,132 and a density of 42.95 persons per km^{2}. The total area was 49.64 km^{2}.

On October 1, 2004, Tsuma, along with the town of Saigō, and the villages of Fuse and Goka (all from Oki District), was merged to create the town of Okinoshima.
