= Tottori Airport =

Tottori Airport 鳥取空港
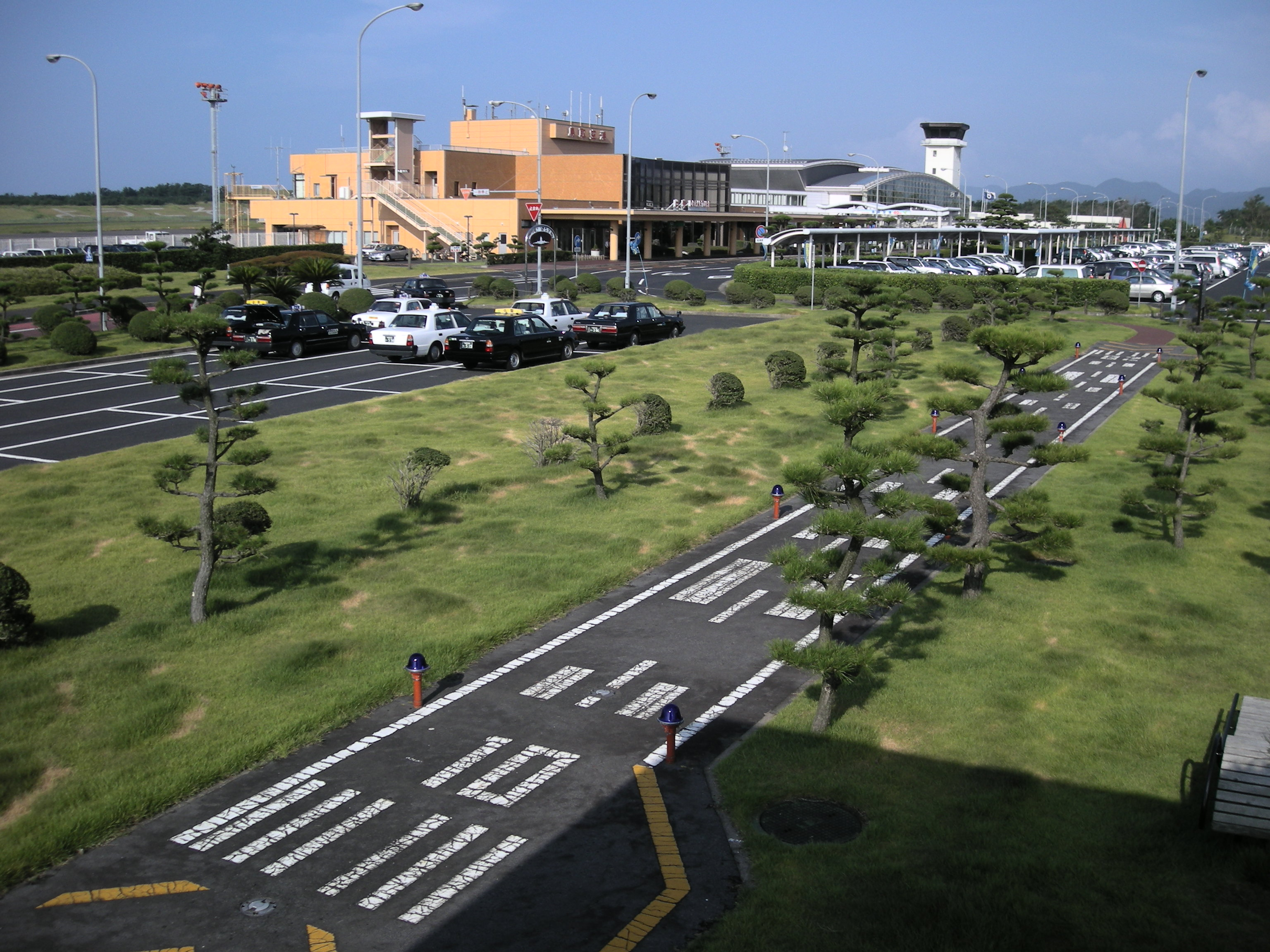
- The terminal of Tottori Airport. The runway park has been converted into a parking lot as of 2019
- IATA: TTJ; ICAO: RJOR

Summary
- Airport type: Public
- Operator: Tottori Airport Authority, Tottori Prefecture
- Serves: Tottori, Japan
- Location: Tottori, Japan
- Elevation AMSL: 48 ft / 15 m
- Coordinates: 35°31′48″N 134°09′45″E
- Website: https://www.ttj-ap-bld.co.jp/

Map
- Location in Tottori Prefecture Location in Japan

Runways
Direction	Length		Surface
Direction	m	ft	Surface
10/28	2,000	6,562	Asphalt concrete

Statistics (2015)
- Passengers: 366,925
- Cargo (metric tonnes): 514
- Aircraft movement: 5,279
- Source: Japanese Ministry of Land, Infrastructure, Transport and Tourism

Tottori Airport (鳥取空港, Tottori Kūkō) (IATA: TTJ, ICAO: RJOR) is an airport serving the city of Tottori, Tottori Prefecture, Japan. The airport is owned and operated by the Tottori Prefecture Tottori Airport Authority (鳥取県鳥取空港管理事務所, Tottori-ken Tottori Kūkō Kanri Jimusho), and has a passenger volume of approximately 330,000 per year. The airport is nicknamed Tottori Sand Dunes Conan Airport (鳥取砂丘コナン空港, Tottori Sakyū Konan Kūkō), named after the Tottori Sand Dunes and the manga series Detective Conan (Case Closed) by Gosho Aoyama, who was born in Hokuei.

== History ==
Tottori City Airport (市営鳥取飛行場, Shiei Tottori Hikōjō) was built 500 meters (1,600 ft) south of the present airport in 1957, and had a runway 960 meters (3,150 ft) long and 30 meters (98 ft) wide. It closed in 1964. In 1967 the present-day Tottori Airport was built and opened by the prefectural government and had a runway 1,200 meters (3,900 ft) long and 30 meters (98 ft) wide. The runway was successively lengthened in 1972 to 1,500 meters (4,900 ft), in 1985 to 1,800 meters (5,900 ft), and to its present length of 2,000 meters (6,600 ft) in 1990. The runway is constructed of asphalt concrete.

Tottori Airport originally had service only to Tokyo, but the Tokyo service ceased in 1969 when the airport began flights to Osaka. The airport had service to both Osaka and Tokyo service from 1979 to 1985, but now only serves Tokyo.

== Facilities ==
Tottori Airport operates from 7 am to 9 pm daily. The terminal building is a two-story structure with an observation deck. A meeting hall, the Tottori Airport International Meeting Hall (鳥取空港国際会館, Tottori Kūkō Kokusai Kakikan), opened in 1996, is adjacent to the airport. The airport also maintains a playground outside the airport.

== Airlines and destinations ==
Airlines	Destinations
All Nippon Airways	Tokyo–Haneda

== Adjacent airports ==
- Miho-Yonago Airport – 84 kilometers (52 mi)
- Okayama Airport – 90 kilometers (56 mi)
- Oki Airport – 104 kilometers (65 mi)
- Izumo Airport – 116 kilometers (72 mi)
- Kobe Airport – 125 kilometers (78 mi)
- Osaka International Airport – 140 kilometers (87 mi)

== Ground transportation ==
=== Road ===
Tottori Airport is accessible on the Tottori Bypass (鳥取バイパス) of Japan National Route 9 via two interchanges of the same name: Airport Entrance (空港入口). Tottori Prefectural Route 264 serves exclusively as the ground access road to Tottori Airport and is accessible only by the two airport interchanges of the Tottori Bypass. Parking, rental car, and taxi services are available at the airport.

=== Rail ===
Tottori does not have an airport railway station. The nearest station is Tottoridaigaku-mae Station (鳥取大学前駅) on the Sanin Main Line of JR West approximately 2 kilometers (1.2 mi) from the airport terminal. Tottoridaigaku-mae Station is two stops (5.5 kilometers (3.4 mi)) from Tottori Station, central to the prefectural capital, which is served by both the Sanin Main Line and the Inbi Line.

=== Bus service ===
Tottori Airport is served by Hinomaru Bus Limited, which offers a connection directly to Tottori Station.

== Hotels ==
No hotels are located at Tottori Airport. Nearby facilities are in Tottori City.

== Nearby attractions ==
- Tottori Sand Dunes – the largest sand dune in Japan, and most visited tourist destination in Tottori Prefecture
- Lake Koyama
- Daisen – the highest mountain in the Chūgoku region which bears a strong resemblance to Mount Fuji. The peak, Kengamine, is inaccessible to hikers due to instability cause by the 2000 Tottori earthquake, but hiking from Daisen-ji to Misen Peak (1,709.4 metres (5,608 ft)) remains a popular alternative.
- Sanbutsu-ji – a Buddhist temple designated a National Treasures of Japan
