= Goka, Shimane =

Dissolved municipality in Shimane prefecture, Japan

Goka (五箇村, Goka-mura) was a village located in Oki District, Shimane Prefecture, Japan.

As of 2003, the village had an estimated population of 2,123 with a population density of 40.52 persons per km^{2}. The total area was 52.39 km^{2}.

On October 1, 2004, Goka was merged with the town of Saigō and the villages of Fuse and Tsuma (all from Oki District) to form the new town of Okinoshima.
