= Saigō, Shimane =

Dissolved municipality in Shimane prefecture, Japan

Saigō (西郷町, Saigō-chō) was a town located on the island of Dōgo in Oki District, Shimane Prefecture, Japan.

== Population ==
As of 2003, the town had an estimated population of 12,855 and a density of 105.07 persons per km^{2}. The total area is 122.35 km^{2}.

== History ==
On October 1, 2004, Saigō, along with the villages of Fuse, Goka and Tsuma (all from Oki District), was merged to create the town of Okinoshima.

== Attractions ==
A set of two station bells designated as Important Cultural Property of Japan is located at the Oki family treasure hall (億岐家宝物館; Oki-ke Hōmotsu-den) in Saigō.
