= Fuse, Shimane =

Dissolved municipality in Shimane prefecture, Japan

Fuse (布施村, Fuse-mura) was a village located in Oki District, Shimane Prefecture, Japan.

As of 2003, the village had an estimated population of 520 and a density of 28.03 persons per km^{2}. The total area was 18.55 km^{2}.

On October 1, 2004, Fuse, along with the town of Saigō, and the villages of Goka and Tsuma (all from Oki District), was merged to create the town of Okinoshima.
