= Hiroshima Heliport =

Former airport that served Hiroshima, Japan (1961–1993)

Hiroshima Heliport Hiroshimanishi Heliport
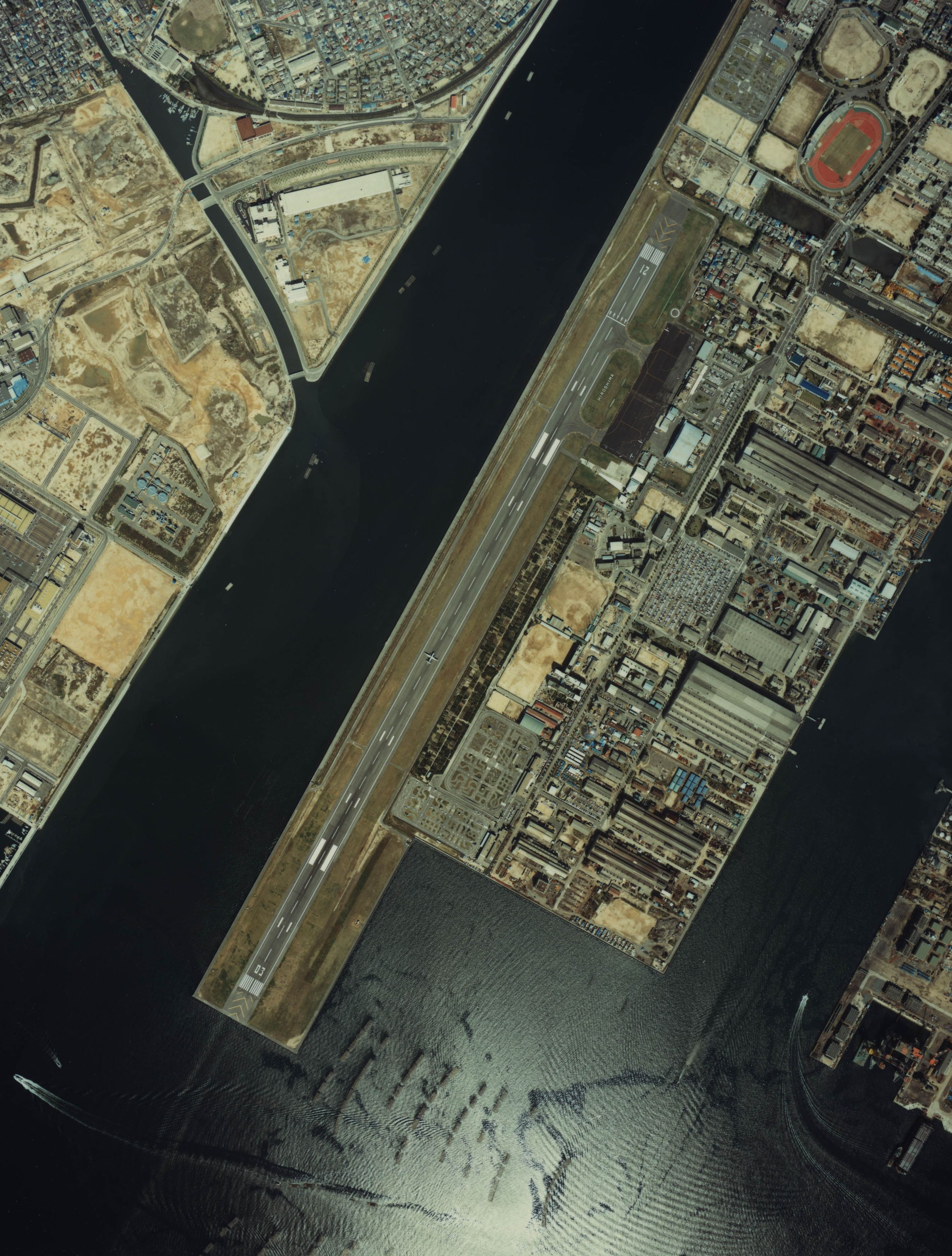
- IATA: HIW; ICAO: RJBH

Summary
- Airport type: Defunct
- Operator: Hiroshima Prefectural Government
- Serves: Hiroshima
- Location: Nishi-ku, Hiroshima, Japan
- Opened: September 15, 1961; 64 years ago
- Closed: November 15, 2012; 13 years ago
- Passenger services ceased: October 30, 2010; 15 years ago
- Elevation AMSL: 9 ft (2.7 m)
- Coordinates: 34°22′01″N 132°24′50″E
- Website: www.hij.airport.jp/nishi/index.html

Map
- Location in Japan RJBH (Japan)

Runways
Direction	Length		Surface
Direction	m	ft	Surface
04/22	1,800	5,906	Asphalt/concrete
- Source: Japanese AIP at AIS Japan

Hiroshima Heliport (広島ヘリポート) (IATA: HIW, ICAO: RJBH), formerly known as Hiroshima–Nishi Airport (広島西飛行場, Hiroshima Nishi Hikōjō) was a heliport in Nishi Ward, located 3.1 NM (5.7 km; 3.6 mi) southwest of Hiroshima City, Japan. The heliport was once a commercial airport before it was closed in November 2012.

== History ==
Hiroshima's first airport, Yoshijima Airport (吉島飛行場), opened on a nearby island in Naka-ku, Hiroshima in 1940. It was largely destroyed during the atomic bombing of Hiroshima in 1945, but was used during the occupation of Japan as a radar base by the Royal Australian Air Force 111 Mobile Fighter Control Unit, and through the 1950s as a landing field for gliders and single-engine piston aircraft.

=== Hiroshima Airport era ===
Following the end of World War II, the Japanese government approved a plan for a new airport in a location which could take advantage of Hiroshima's natural river topography to keep aircraft from flying over residential areas. Hiroshima Airport opened on September 15, 1961, and was initially managed by the Ministry of Transport. Its passenger terminal was the second-largest in Japan at the time, after Haneda Airport.

The runway was extended from 1200 meters to 1800 meters in 1972. All Nippon Airways began Boeing 737 jet service to the airport in 1979, followed by Boeing 767 service in 1983.

An international terminal opened in 1991, and the airport subsequently accommodated Japan Airlines and Asiana Airlines flights to Seoul-Gimpo, as well as Dragonair flights to Kai Tak Airport in Hong Kong.

=== Hiroshima-Nishi era ===
Further expansion was necessary to support large jet service, and the airport's location made this impossible. A new Hiroshima Airport was built outside the city, and most airline operations moved to the new airport effective October 29, 1993. The old Hiroshima Airport was then renamed Hiroshima–Nishi Airport and fell under the control of Hiroshima Prefecture.

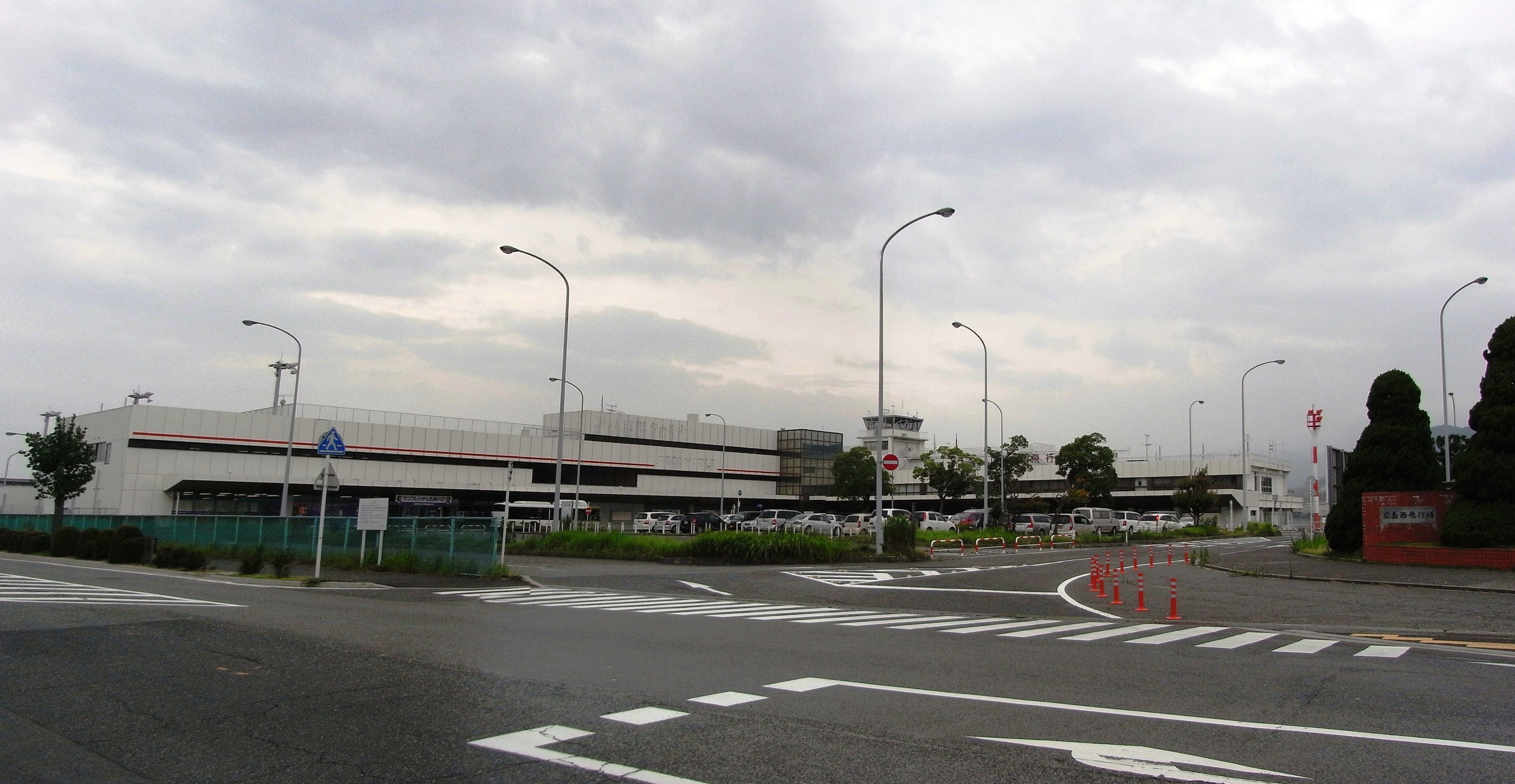
Terminal building in 2008

Upon the opening of the new Hiroshima Airport, J-Air continued to be based at Hiroshima–Nishi until 2005, originally as a division of the JAL Flight Academy, and later provided commuter service to domestic airports using Jetstream 31 and then Bombardier CRJ-200 aircraft. J-Air was the only scheduled airline that remained at Hiroshima-Nishi until JAC began operating in late 1990's. J-Air left the airport at the end of March 2005 and shift its operations to Nagoya-Komaki.

For the short period of time in 2001, Fair Inc (which later known as Ibex Airlines) also operate service from the airport to Kagoshima and Sendai between March and September 2001.

Following J-Air's departure, Japan Air Commuter continued to offer commuter service to Miyazaki and Kagoshima using Saab 340 aircraft from April 2005 until October 31, 2010, when the service was terminated as part of the corporate restructuring of its parent company Japan Airlines.

Hiroshima City and Hiroshima Prefecture officials debated the future of the airport for several years in the early 2000s. City officials sought to keep the airport open in order to boost the city's economy, while prefectural officials preferred converting the southern part of the property into a heliport and building an extension of the Hiroshima South Road through the northern part. Following JAC's withdrawal from the airport, Hiroshima City legislators proposed converting the airport into a municipal airport. The ordinance proposal was rejected by the city assembly in March 2011, and a new mayor announced in May that the airport would be converted to a heliport by 2012, in line with the prefecture's original proposal.

=== Hiroshima Heliport ===
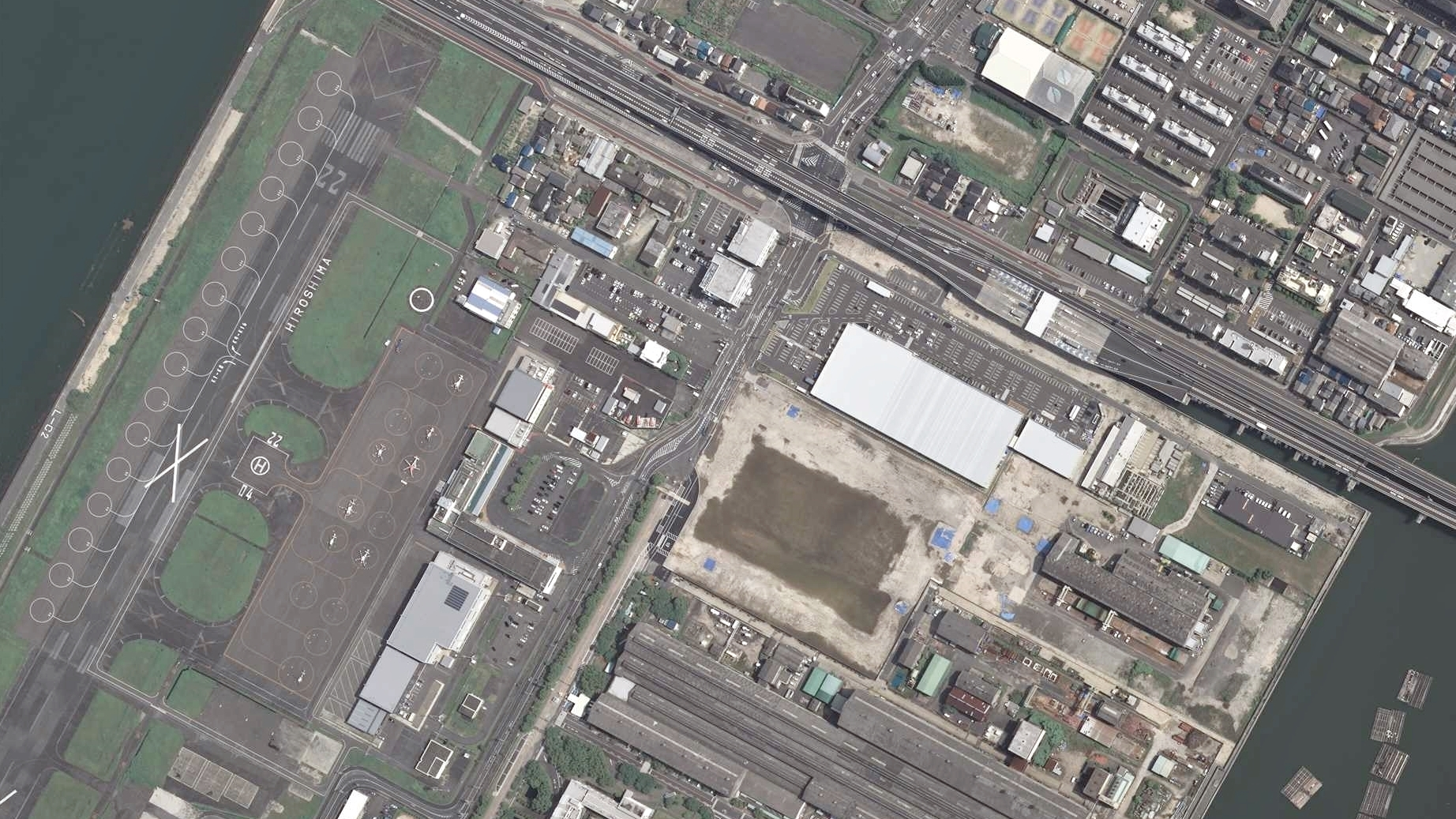
Aerial view of Hiroshima Heliport in 2018

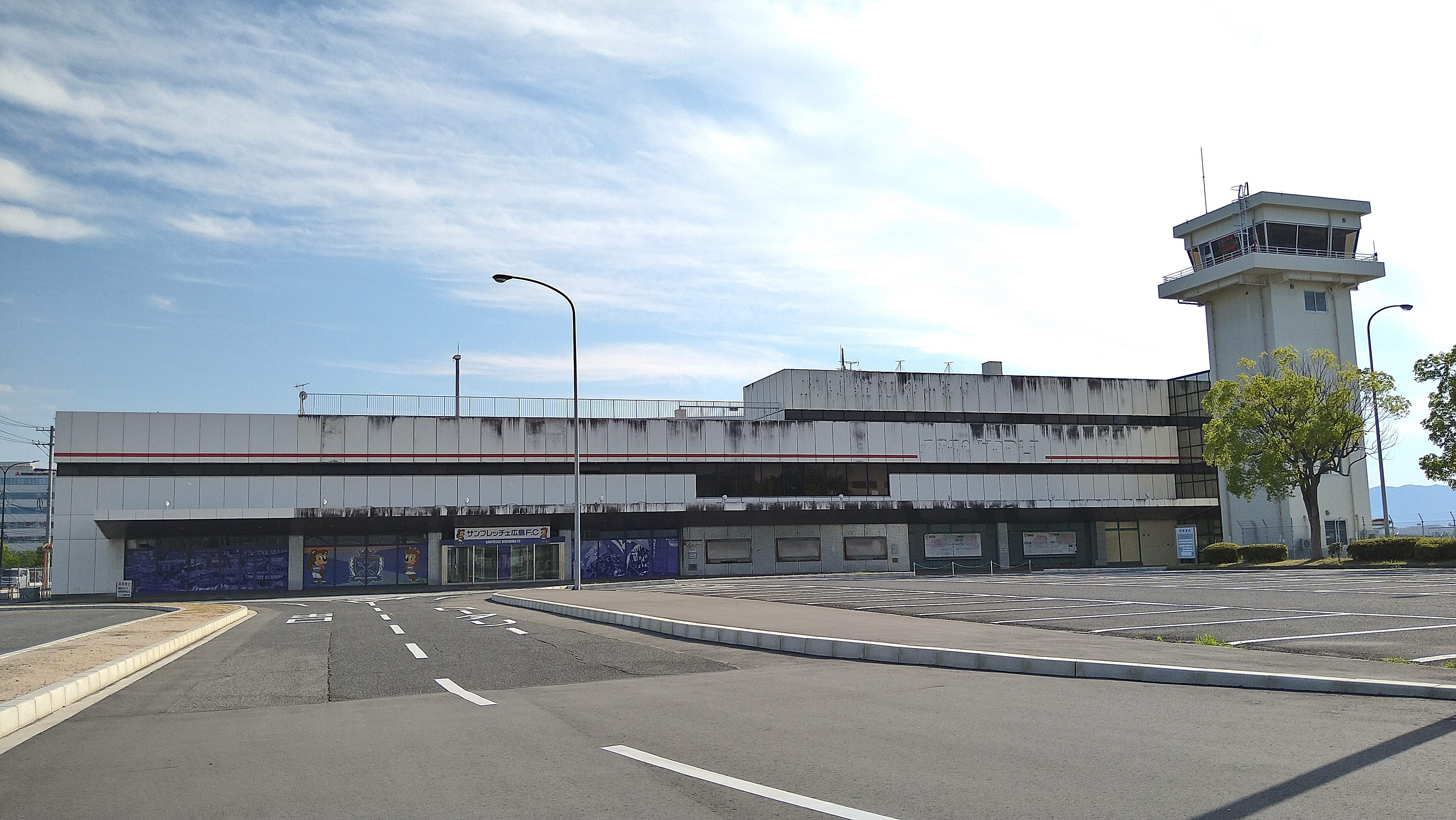
Heliport terminal building in 2022

Hiroshima Heliport commenced operations on November 15, 2012, and thereafter a number of aviation facilities were relocated so that the heliport site could be downsized. The heliport was used by Marine One helicopters carrying U.S. President Barack Obama during his 2016 visit to Hiroshima. The buildings, apron, and runway were renovated prior to the 2023 G7 Summit in Hiroshima, which saw a number of world leaders use the heliport.

Most of the former airport site was redeveloped as the "Hiroshima Innovation Techno Port" industrial park by Daiwa House, with the first phase commencing in 2019 and the second phase commencing in 2021.

The former Hiroshima Airport arrivals hall now houses the offices of football club Sanfrecce Hiroshima.
