= Oki Airport =

Oki Airport 隠岐空港
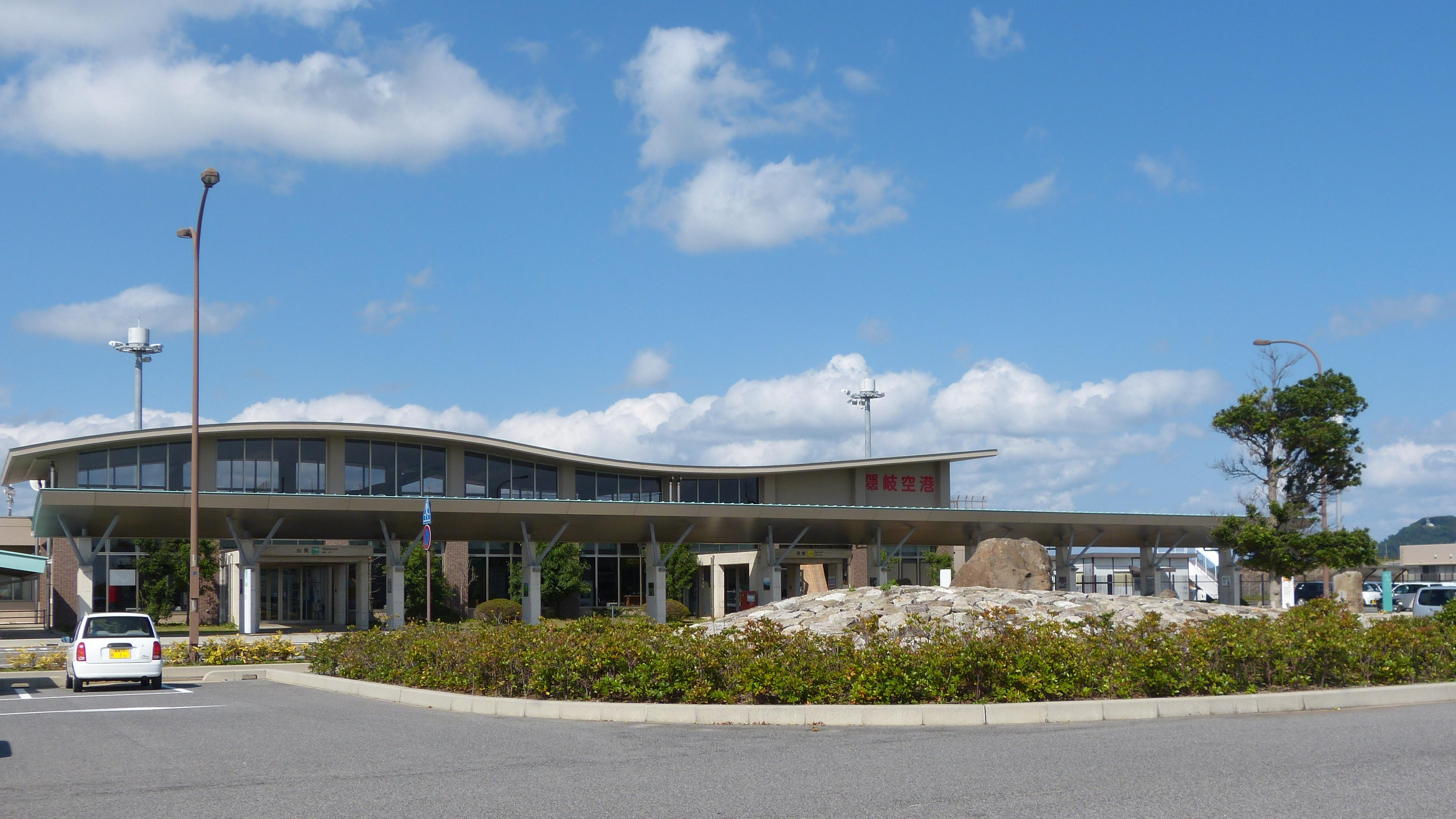
- IATA: OKI; ICAO: RJNO

Summary
- Airport type: Public
- Operator: Government
- Serves: Okinoshima, Shimane Prefecture
- Location: Dōgojima, Oki Islands, Shimane Prefecture
- Elevation AMSL: 262 ft / 80 m
- Coordinates: 36°10′42″N 133°19′24″E

Map
- Location in Shimane Prefecture RJNO (Japan)

Runways
Direction	Length		Surface
Direction	m	ft	Surface
08/26	2,000	6,562	Asphalt concrete

Statistics (2015)
- Passengers: 58,436
- Cargo (metric tonnes): 0
- Aircraft movement: 1,650
- Source: Japanese Ministry of Land, Infrastructure, Transport and Tourism

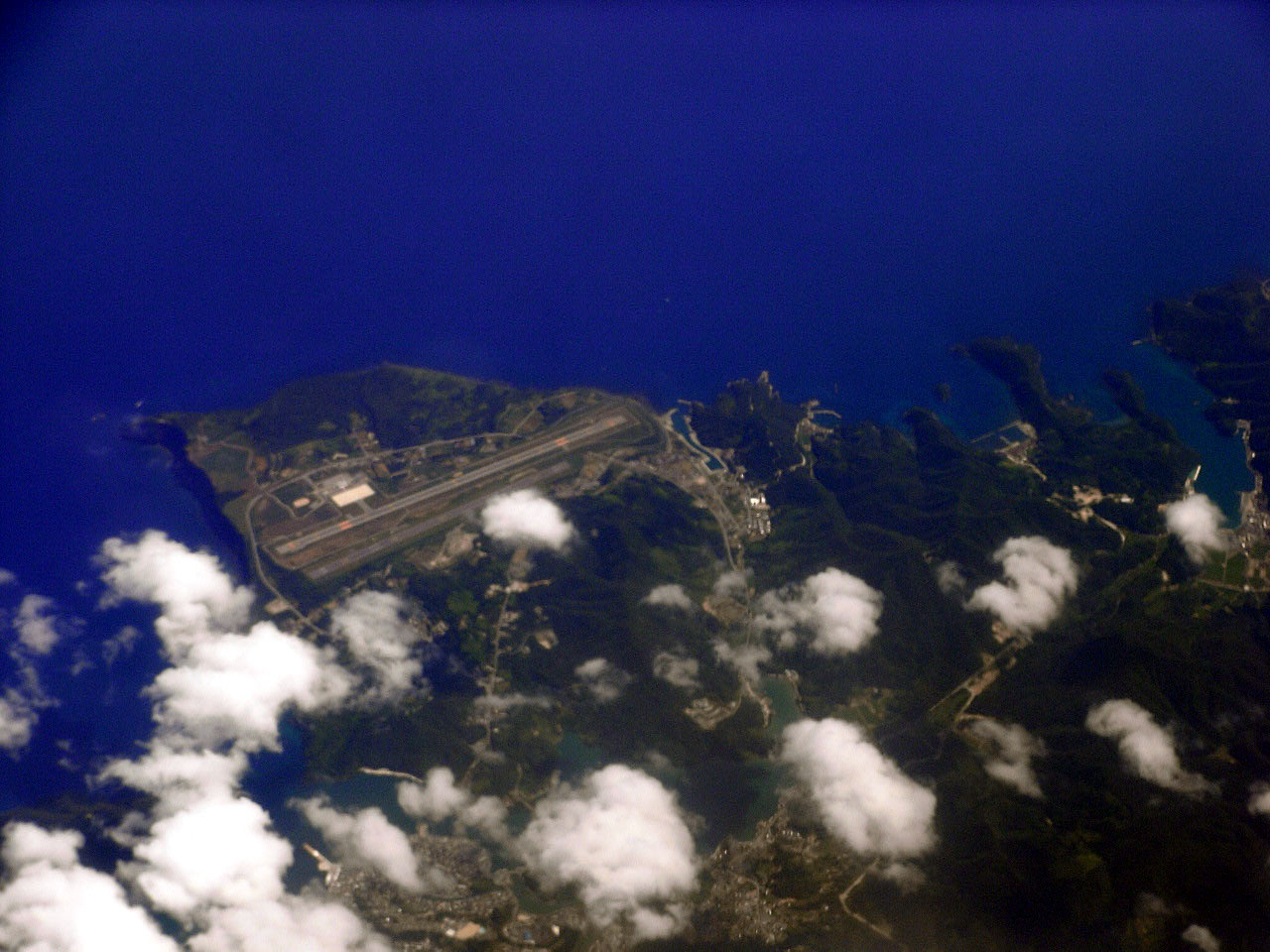
Aerial view of Oki Airport

Oki Airport (隠岐空港, Oki Kūkō) (IATA: OKI, ICAO: RJNO) is an airport on Dōgo, one of the Oki Islands in the Shimane Prefecture of Japan. It is located approximately three kilometers south of the center of Okinoshima, the most populous town on these islands.

Oki Airport is a Class III facility with a 2,000 m × 45 m (6,562 ft × 148 ft) runway. It provides air service to Osaka International Airport ("Itami", ITM) and Izumo Airport (IZO).

== History ==
Oki Airport was first opened in August 1965 with a 1200-meter runway for irregularly scheduled services to Yonago Airport. Irregularly scheduled services to Izumo Airport began in July 1966. The airport received its Class-3 certification from the Japanese government in July 1968, permitting regularly scheduled passenger services to those locations. Services to Osaka began from April 1975. From November 1978, the airport was closed to permit strengthening of its runway. The airport reopened in April 1979 with a 1500-meter runway. However, a new airport was opened in July 2006 at a site adjacent to the former airport, with a 2000-meter runway, permitting jet operations. The airport terminal building is located on the southeast side of the runway. Boarding bridges were not installed until August 2021.

== Airlines and destinations ==
Airlines	Destinations
J-Air	Osaka–Itami
Japan Air Commuter	Izumo
