= Izumo Airport =

Airport in Izumo, Shimane Prefecture, Japan

Izumo Airport 出雲空港
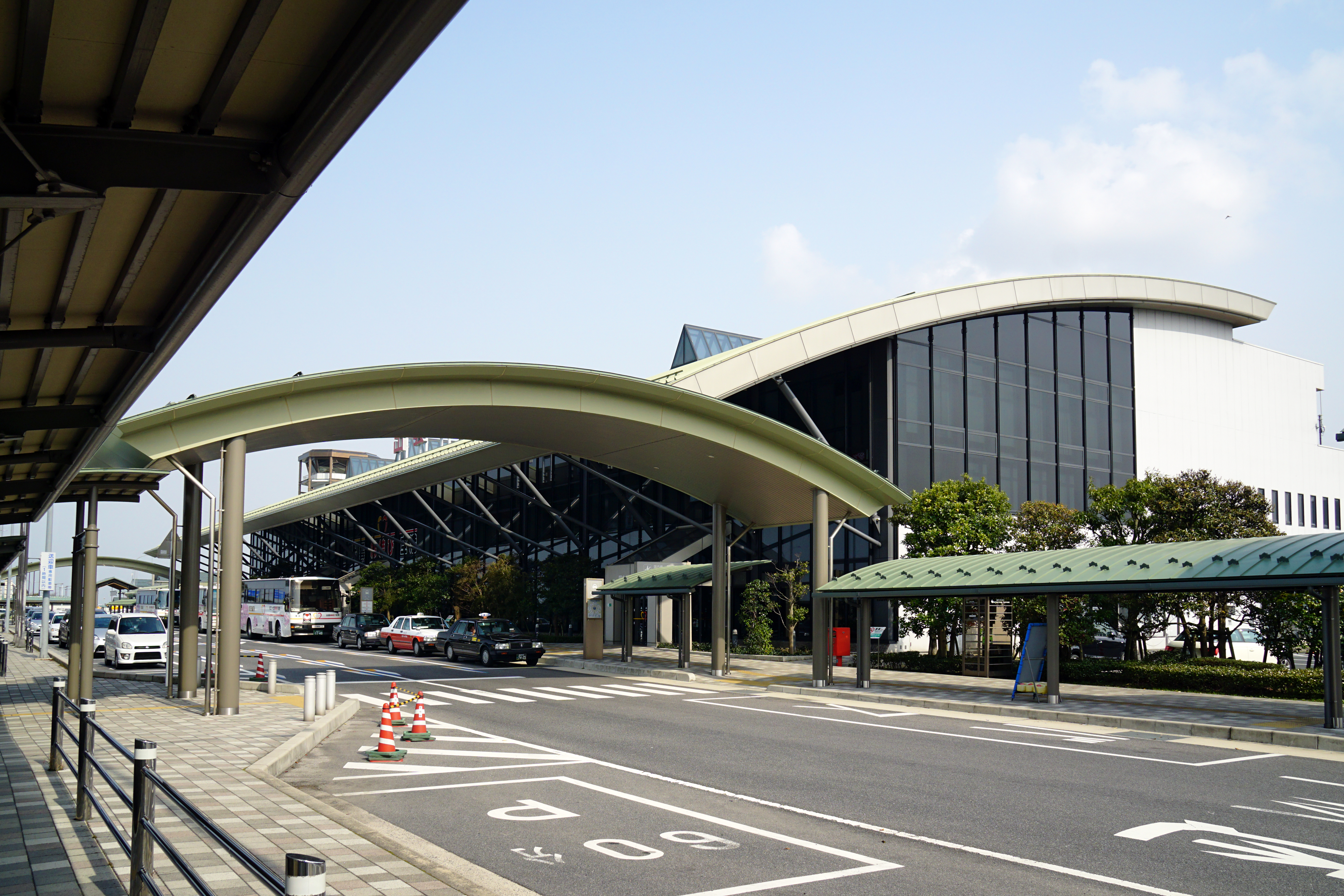
- IATA: IZO; ICAO: RJOC

Summary
- Airport type: Public
- Operator: Shimane Prefecture
- Serves: Shimane and Tottori prefectures
- Location: Izumo, Shimane Prefecture, Japan
- Opened: June 1966; 60 years ago
- Elevation AMSL: 6 ft (1.8 m)
- Coordinates: 35°24′49″N 132°53′24″E

Map
- Location in Shimane Prefecture IZO/RJOC (Japan)

Runways
Direction	Length		Surface
Direction	m	ft	Surface
07/25	2,000	6,562	Asphalt concrete

Statistics (2015)
- Passengers: 832,825
- Cargo (metric tonnes): 1,066
- Aircraft movement: 11,957
- Source: Japanese Ministry of Land, Infrastructure, Transport and Tourism

Izumo Airport (出雲空港, Izumo Kūkō) (IATA: IZO, ICAO: RJOC) is an airport in the Hikawa area of Izumo, Shimane Prefecture, Japan, about 20–30 minutes by car from central Izumo or Matsue city centre. This airport is also known as Izumo En-Musubi Airport (出雲縁結び空港); meaning Izumo Airport of Romantic Fate.

== History ==
The airport opened in June 1966 with a runway length of 1,200 m. The runway was extended to 1,500 m in December 1970, and 2,000 m in March 1991.

Scheduled service began in July 1966, with a daily YS-11 flight to Osaka and a daily de Havilland Heron flight to Oki. YS-11 service to Tokyo began in 1979, and was upgraded to DC-9 jet service in 1980 and A300 widebody service in 1993. Routes added since then include Fukuoka (YS-11 from December 1984), Hiroshima-Nishi (BAe Jetstream from 1996), Sapporo (MD-87 from 1996), Komatsu (BAe Jetstream from 1996), Okinawa (MD-90 from 1997), and Nagoya (Saab 340 from 1997).

== Facilities ==
The airport terminal has three jet bridge gates, and is equipped with customs and immigration facilities for international charter flights. The Shimane Prefectural Police also has an air base on site.

== Airlines and destinations ==
Airlines	Destinations
Fuji Dream Airlines	Nagoya–Centrair, Nagoya–Komaki, Shizuoka
J-Air	Osaka–Itami
Japan Air Commuter	Fukuoka, Oki
Japan Airlines	Tokyo–Haneda

== Ground transportation ==
Bus service is available to Matsue and Izumo. There is no rail service to the airport; the closest railway station is Shōbara Station, about 10 minutes away by car.
